= King (surname) =

- Pronunciation: /kɪŋ/
- Language: English

King is an English surname. It is also an Anglicized form of the German surname Küng (also König, Koenig and other forms), which in many German dialects is pronounced like king. This originally German form is widespread among American Mennonites and Amish.

== Origins and variants ==
The English name may be related to the Old English word for a tribal leader, cyning, which derives from the Proto-Germanic kuningaz.

The origins of the King surname date back to the time of the Anglo-Saxon tribes of Britain.

== People ==
=== Disambiguation of common names with this surname ===
- Alan King (disambiguation)
- Albert King (disambiguation)
- Andrew or Andy King
- Anthony King (disambiguation)
- Ben King (disambiguation)
- Brandon King (disambiguation)
- Catherine King (disambiguation)
- Charles (Charlie, or Chuck) King
- Chris King (disambiguation).
- Daniel (or Dan, Danny) King
- David (or Dave, Davey) King
- Derek King (disambiguation)
- Edward (Ed, or Eddie) King
- Eric King (disambiguation)
- Frank King (disambiguation)
- Frederick King (disambiguation)
- Gary King (disambiguation)
- George King (disambiguation)
- Harry King (disambiguation)
- Helen King (disambiguation)
- Henry King (disambiguation)
- Howard (or Howie) King
- Ian King (disambiguation)
- James (Jim, or Jimmy) King
- Jack King (disambiguation)
- Jason King (disambiguation)
- Jeff (or Jeffrey) King
- Joe or Joseph King
- John (or Johnny) King
- Katie King (disambiguation)
- Kenneth King (or Ken, Kenny) King
- Kevin King (disambiguation)
- Larry King (disambiguation)
- Leonard (or Len) King
- Mark King (disambiguation)
- Mary King (disambiguation)
- Martin King (disambiguation)
- Matthew or Matt King
- Mervyn King (disambiguation)
- Michael (or Mike) King
- Nancy King (disambiguation)
- Patrick (or Pat) King
- Paul King (disambiguation)
- Peter (or Pete) King
- Philip (or Phil) King
- Preston King (disambiguation)
- Ray King (disambiguation)
- Richard (or Rich) King
- Robert (or Bob, Bobby, Rob, Robbie, or Robby) King
- Ross King (disambiguation)
- Rufus King (disambiguation)
- Simon King (disambiguation)
- Stephen, Steve or Steven King
- Susan King (disambiguation)
- Thomas (or Tom) King
- Tony King (disambiguation)
- William (or Bill, Billy, Will, Willie, Willy) King

=== Academics ===
- Georgiana Goddard King (1871–1939), American Hispanist and medievalist
- Karen Leigh King (born 1954), American historian of religion and professor
- Kenneth King (academic), British historian and Africanist
- Lida Shaw King (1868–1932), American classicist and college dean
- Ursula King (academic) (born 1938) German theologian and scholar of religion

=== Arts and music ===
- Aja Naomi King (born 1985), American actress
- Albert King (1923–1992), American blues guitarist and singer-songwriter
- Allyn King (1899–1930), American stage and film actress
- Alexander King (author) (1899–1965), American author, U.S. humorist, memoirist, and TV personality
- Amanda King (filmmaker), Australian filmmaker
- B.B. King (1925–2015), American blues guitarist and singer-songwriter
- Ben E. King (1938–2015), American singer
- Bertie King (1912–1981), Jamaican jazz and mento musician
- Betty Jackson King (1928–1994), American musician and composer
- Bianca King (born 1985), Filipina actor
- Bill King (1927–2005), American radio announcer
- Bobby King (musician) (1941–1983), American blues guitarist, singer and songwriter
- Brett King (1920–1999), American actor and businessman
- Carole King, American singer and songwriter
- Clydie King (1943–2019), American R&B singer, member of Ray Charles' backing group The Raelettes
- Diana King (born 1970), Jamaican singer
- Dennis King (actor), actor
- Dorothy King (artist), British painter
- Earl King (1934–2003), American blues singer-songwriter
- Earline Heath King (1913–2011), American sculptor
- Emeline King (born 1957), American industrial designer, author
- Emmett King (1865–1953), American actor
- Fay King (cartoonist) (1889–1972), American newspaper cartoonist
- Freddie King (1934–1976), American blues guitarist
- Georgia King, actress
- Hannah T. King (1808–1886), British-American writer
- Hayward Ellis King (1928–1990), American visual artist and curator
- Héctor King (born 1982), Mexican recording artist
- Henry King (director) (1886–1982), American film director
- Inge King (1915–2016), German-born Australian sculptor
- Jasmina Jazzy King, German-English singer
- Jesse King (musician), Nigerian musician
- Jessie Marion King, Scottish painter and illustrator
- Jean Paul King, American announcer and actor
- Jonathan King, British musician and record producer
- Jonathan King (film director), New Zealand film director
- Jon King (born 1955), English singer, musician, songwriter, and art director
- Jon King (1963–1995), American actor and model
- Kerry King (born 1964), American rock musician
- Mabel King (1932–1999), American film, stage, and television actor
- Marcia Gygli King (1931–2011), American artist
- Margaret King (painter), 18th-century British artist
- Michelle King (born 1958), American TV writer and producer
- Mollie King (born 1987), British singer
- Nika King, American comedian and actress
- Pee Wee King (1914–2000), American country music singer
- Peggy King (1930–2026), American jazz singer and actress
- Regina King (born 1971), American actor
- Rowena King (born 1970), British actor
- Ruby King, German-English singer
- Sidney E. King (1906–2002), American painter
- Solomon King (1930–2005), American singer
- Teddi King (1929–1977), American jazz and pop vocalist
- Wayne King (1901–1985), American musician, singer, songwriter and orchestral leader
- Wright King (1923–2018), American actor

=== Military ===
- Cecil Frederick King (1899–1919), British fighter ace
- Elwyn Roy King (1894–1941), Australian World War I fighter ace
- Ernest J. King (1878–1956), US Navy fleet admiral, Commander in Chief, United States Fleet, and Chief of Naval Operations during World War II

=== Politics and government ===
- Adam King (congressman) (1783–1835), former US Representative from Pennsylvania
- Alveda King (born 1951), American politician and minister
- Angela King (diplomat) (1938–2007), Jamaican diplomat
- Angus King (born 1944), U.S. senator and former governor of Maine
- Bruce King (1924–2009), former governor of New Mexico
- Carroll F. King (1924–2010), American politician and businessman
- Charity King, American politician
- Coretta Scott King (1927–2006), American civil rights leader and widow of Martin Luther King Jr.
- Dick King (politician) (1934–2018), American politician
- Dwayne A. King (born 1939), American politician
- Frederick King (politician) (1923–2016), Canadian House of Commons member
- Lawrence E. King Jr. (born 1944), American politician and banker
- Leslie Lynch King Jr. (1913–2006), birth name of Gerald Ford, former president of the United States
- Martin Luther King III (born 1957), American human rights activist, philanthropist and son of Martin Luther King Jr.
- Martin Luther King Jr. (1929–1968), American civil rights leader
- Martin Luther King Sr. (1899–1984), American civil rights activist, Baptist pastor, missionary, and father of Martin Luther King Jr.
- Owen King (Wisconsin) (1845–1932), American politician and businessman
- Ralph E. King (1902–1974), American physician and Louisiana state senator
- Thérèse King (1934–2015), Senegalese politician
- Thomas Starr King (1824–1864), American Universalist and Unitarian minister influential in California politics during the American Civil War.
- William Lyon Mackenzie King (1874–1950), 10th prime minister of Canada

=== Science ===
- Elizabeth O. King (1912–1966), American microbiologist
- Jackie King (1945–2025), British-born South African hydrologist
- Leonard William King (1869–1919), English archaeologist
- Lester Charles King (1907–1989), English geomorphologist
- R. Bruce King, American inorganic chemist
- Victor L. King (1886–1958), American chemist

=== Sports ===
- Adam King (footballer) (born 1995), Scottish footballer
- Alana King (born 1995), Australia Women's cricketer
- Alex King (basketball) (born 1985), German basketballer
- Barry King (decathlete) (1945–2021), British Olympic decathlete, corporate director and author
- Barry King (tennis) (born 1985), Irish tennis player
- Bernard King (born 1956), American basketball player
- Billie Jean King (born 1943), American tennis player
- Brandon King, Jamaican and West Indies cricket player
- Bryan King (baseball) (born 1996), American baseball player
- Cathy King, Canadian curler
- Collis King, former West Indian cricketer
- Dana M. King, American college sports coach
- Darian King (born 1992), Barbadian tennis player
- D'Eriq King (born 1997), American football player
- Desmond King (American football) (born 1994), American football player
- D. J. King (born 1984), Canadian professional ice hockey player
- Dick King (American football) (1895–1930), American football player
- Dolly King (1916–1969), American basketball player
- Don King (boxing promoter) (born 1931), American boxing promoter
- Don King (photographer) (born 1960), American surfing photographer
- Dwight King (born 1989), Canadian professional ice hockey player
- Emmit King (1959–2021), American sprinter
- Ernie King (1903–1993), English footballer who played for Southampton
- Evan King (born 1992), American tennis player
- Fay King (American football) (1922–1983), American football player
- Frances King (cricketer) (1980–2003), cricketer from New Zealand
- Frederick King (cricketer) (1850–1893), English cricketer
- Gayl King, Canadian darts player
- Gordon King, American football player
- Hannah King (rugby union) (born 2004), rugby player
- Haynes King (born 2001), American football player
- Jim King, American baseball player
- John King (baseball), American baseball player
- John King (racing driver), American NASCAR driver
- John King (rugby league), rugby league footballer of the 1940s
- Jordan King, British IndyCar driver
- Joshua King (footballer, born 1992) (born 1992), Norwegian footballer
- Kim King (American football), American college football player
- Lamar King (born 1975), American football player
- Laurence Eastern "Laurie" King (1908–1992), Australian rules footballer
- Ledley King (born 1980), English footballer
- Liatu King (born 2002), American basketball player
- Lilly King (born 1997), American swimmer
- Louis King (basketball) (born 1999), American basketball player
- Marlon King (born 1980), Jamaican footballer
- Reggie King (born 1957), American basketball player
- Sam King (golfer) (1911–2003), professional golfer
- Savannah King (soccer) (born 2005), American soccer player
- Savannah King (swimmer) (born 1992), Canadian freestyle swimmer
- Seaver King (born 2003), American baseball player
- Shaun King (American football), American football player and sports commentator
- Shawn King (basketball), (born 1982), Saint Vincent and the Grenadines basketball player
- Stacy-Ann King (born 1983) former West Indies Women's Cricketer
- Syd King (1873–1933), English footballer and manager
- Vania King (born 1989), American tennis player
- W. J. King (1864–1934), American college football coach

=== Writing ===
- Basil King (1859–1928), Canadian novelist and non-fiction writer
- Dawn King (born 1978), British playwright and screenwriter
- Florence King (1936–2016), American novelist, essayist and columnist
- Frances King (philanthropist) (1757–1821), writer and philanthropist
- Francis King (novelist) (1923–2011), British novelist, poet and short story writer
- Grace King, American author
- Hannah T. King (1808–1886), British-American writer and pioneer
- Jessie Margaret King (1862–?), Scottish essayist, journalist and poet
- Michelle King (journalist), journalist and women's rights activist
- Rax King, American writer
- Stephen King (born 1947), American horror author

=== Other ===
- Beverly Sedgwick King (1876–1935), philatelist of New York City
- Deborah G. King (1839–1922) American temperance activist and suffragist
- Esther Augusta Howard King (1845–1925), American clubwoman
- Ginevra King (1898–1980), American socialite
- Jean Ledwith King (1924–2021), American activist
- Kelly King (born 1948), American businesswoman
- Michelle King (educator) (1961–2019), American educator
- Richard D. King (1879–1945), American architect
- Rodney King (1965–2012), American man beaten by Los Angeles police
- Walter Gawen King (1851–1935), British Indian army physician and public health pioneer
- Willford I. King, American statistician and economist

== Fictional characters ==
- Amanda King, in the television series Scarecrow and Mrs. King
- Caesar King, in the video game Zenless Zone Zero
- Tara King, in The Avengers television series

== See also ==
- Captain King (disambiguation)
- General King (disambiguation)
- Judge King (disambiguation)
- Justice King (disambiguation)
- Senator King (disambiguation)
- William Bradley-King (born 1997), American football player
