= King Harold =

King Harold or Harald may refer to:

== Kings of England ==
- Harold Harefoot, or Harold I (c. 1015–1040)
- Harold Godwinson, or Harold II (c. 1022–1066)

== Kings of Denmark ==
- Harald Bluetooth (935–985/986)
- Harald II of Denmark (c. 996–1018)
- Harald III of Denmark (1040–1080)

== Kings of Norway ==
- Harald Fairhair (850–933)
- Harald Greycloak (c. 935–970)
- Harald Hardrada (1015–1066)
- Harald Gille (c. 1102–1136)
- Harald V of Norway (1937–2026)

== Others ==
- Harald I Olafsson (died 1248), King of Mann & the Hebrides
- King Harold (Shrek), fictional character in films

== See also ==
- Harold I (disambiguation)
- Harold II (disambiguation)
- Harold III (disambiguation)
- Harold King (disambiguation)
