= List of health ministers of Senegal =

This is a list of health ministers of Senegal since the 1960s.

== List of ministers ==
- 1960 : Amadou Boubacar Sarr
- 1961 : Amadou Cissé Dia
- 1962 : Ibrahima Diallo
- 1962-1963 : Demba Coly
- 1966-1968 : Abdoulaye Ly
- 1970-1972 : Daouda Sow
- 1973-1974 : Coumba Ndoffène Diouf
- 1975 : Matar Ndiaye
- 1975-1978 : Doudou Ngom
- 1985 : Mamadou Diop
- 1986 : Thierno Ba
- 1986-1987 Marie Sarr Mbodj (première femme)
- 1988-1990 : Thérèse King
- 1990-1995 : Assane Diop
- 1995-1998 : Ousmane Ngom
- 1998-2000 : Assane Diop
- 2001 : Abdou Fall
- 2001-2003 : Awa Marie Coll Seck
- 2003-2004 : Issa Mbaye Samb
- 2004 : Aminata Diallo
- 2004-2005 : Issa Mbaye Samb
- 2005-2007 : Abdou Fall
- 2007 : Issa Mbaye Samb
- 2007-April 2009 : Safiatou Thiam
- May 2009-September 2009 : Thèrèse Coumba Diop
- December 2009-April 2012 : Modou Diagne Fada
- April 2012-September 2017 : Awa Marie Coll Seck
- September 2017-May 2022 : Abdoulaye Diouf Sarr
- Since May 2022 : Marie Kermesse Ndom Ndiaye
