= King Kenny =

King Kenny may refer to:

- King Kenny (internet personality) (born 1997), an English social media personality and former boxer
- Kenny Dalglish (born 1951), a Scottish footballer widely known by this nickname

== See also ==
- King Kenneth (disambiguation)
- Kenneth King (disambiguation)
