= Margaret King (disambiguation) =

Margaret King may refer to:

- Margaret King (1773–1835), Anglo-Irish hostess and writer
- Margaret King (painter) (active 1779–1787), London-based pastel artist
- Margaret I. King, first librarian at University of Kentucky, namesake of Margaret I. King Library
- Maghi King, British-Swiss computational linguist
- Margaret L. King (born 1947), American historian of the Italian Renaissance
- Margaret Williamson King (1861–1949), Scottish author
