= Kung =

Kung or Küng may refer to:

- ǃKung people
- ǃKung language
- Kung (Haida village), an historical village of the Haida people of the Haida Gwaii archipelago in British Columbia, Canada; also Kung Indian Reserve No. 11 at the same location
- Kung, alternate name of Kong, Iran, city on the Persian Gulf
- Kung (宮), first note in the Chinese pentatonic scale or do
- "Kung", a song by the rock band Phish
- Kung (comics), a supervillain from DC Comics
- Kung, Sila Lat, Sila Lat District, Sisaket Province, Thailand
- KUNG, a vehicle module
- Küng Blockflöten GmbH, Swiss recorder maker

== Surnames ==
- Küng (also Kueng), people with the surname
- Kong (surname) or 孔; Kung is a transliteration of this common Chinese and Korean surname
