= Billy Boles =

Billy Boles may refer to:

- Billy J. Boles (1938–2021), United States Air Force general
- Billy Boles (politician) (1927–2008), American lawyer and politician
