= Peter King =

Peter King may refer to:

== Music ==
- Pete King (composer) (1914–1982), American
- Pete King (saxophonist) (1929–2009), English jazz, manager of Ronnie Scott's club
- Peter King (Nigerian musician) (1939–2023), Nigerian saxophonist
- Peter King (saxophonist) (1940–2020), English jazz, worked with Charlie Watts
- Pete King (British musician) (1958–1987), British rock drummer

== Politics ==
- Peter King, 1st Baron King (1669–1734), Lord Chancellor of England
- Peter King, 7th Baron King (1776–1833), English aristocrat, politician, and economic writer
- Peter King, 5th Earl of Lovelace (1951–2018), British peer
- Peter King (British politician) (1811–1885) Liberal Party MP
- Peter Maurice King (1940–2018), Australian, National Country Party
- Peter King (Australian politician) (born 1952), Liberal Party
- Peter King (Northern Ireland politician), judge and Unionist politician
- Peter King (American politician) (born 1944), U.S. representative from New York

== Sports ==
- Peter King (cricketer) (born 1959), Australian
- Peter King (footballer, born 1943) (born 1943), English footballer with Cardiff City
- Peter King (footballer, born 1964) (1964–2012), English footballer with Crewe Alexandra
- Peter King (Gaelic footballer) (born 1983), Irish

== Other ==
- Peter King (British Army officer) (1916–1962), during World War II
- Peter King (make-up artist) (born 1955), for the film The Lord of the Rings: The Return of the King
- Peter King (sportswriter) (born 1957), American writer previously for Sports Illustrated
- Peter King, former editor in chief of Pro Wrestling Illustrated.
- Peter King, Australian business executive, CEO of Westpac

== See also ==
- King (surname)
