= Ralph King =

Ralph King may refer to:

- Ralph King-Milbanke, 2nd Earl of Lovelace (1839–1906), British author
- Ralph E. King (1902–1974), member of the Louisiana State Senate
- Ralph King (American football) (1901–1978), American football player
