= Paul King =

Paul King may refer to:

== Entertainment ==
- Paul King (novelist) (1931–2014), pseudonym of American writer Donald Moffitt
- Paul King (Mungo Jerry) (born 1948), British singer and guitarist with pop group Mungo Jerry
- Paul King (VJ) (born 1960), Irish-born English singer, formerly with the group King, and a VJ
- Paul King (director) (born 1978), British TV and film director, known for The Mighty Boosh and the Paddington films
- Paul King (entrepreneur) (born 1984), American chief executive of Hercules Networks
- Paul King (screenwriter) (1926–1996), American producer and screenwriter

== Sports ==
- Paul King (cricketer) (born 1979), English cricketer
- Paul King (rugby league) (born 1979), British rugby league footballer
- Paul King (American football official), NFL official

== Others ==
- Paul Henry King, British commissioner in the Chinese Maritime Customs Service
- Ulmus 'Paul King', an elm tree cultivar
