= Andrew King =

Andrew or Andy King may refer to:

== Law and politics ==
- Andrew King (American politician) (1812–1895), member of the U.S. House of Representatives from Missouri
- Andrew Jackson King (1833–1923), American lawyer, judge, and legislator
- Andy King (British politician) (1948–2026), British Labour politician
- Andrew King (New Zealand politician) (born 1960 or 1961), Mayor of Hamilton
- Andy King (American politician) (born 1962), member of the New York City Council
- Andrew King (spy) (1915–2002), British intelligence officer

== Science ==
- Andrew King (astrophysicist) (born 1947), British astrophysicist
- Andrew King (neurophysiologist) (born 1959), British neurophysiologist

== Sports ==
=== Association football (soccer) ===
- Andy King (footballer, born 1942) (1942–2015), Scottish footballer
- Andy King (footballer, born 1956) (1956–2015), English footballer and manager
- Andy King (footballer, born 1970), English footballer
- Andy King (footballer, born 1988), Wales international footballer

=== Other sports ===
- Andrew King (rugby league) (born 1975), Australian rugby league footballer
- Andy King (American football) (born 1978), American football player

== Others ==
- Andrew King (music manager) (born 1948), formerly of Blackhill Enterprises
- Andrew King (professor) (born 1957), British professor of English literature
- Andrew King (architect), Canadian architect and cross-disciplinary artist

== See also ==
- Andrew Lawrence-King (born 1959), British harpist and early music specialist
