= Harold King =

Harold King may refer to:

- Harold King (politician) (1906–1983), Australian politician
- Harold King (rugby league), Australian rugby league player
- Hal King (born 1944), retired Major League Baseball player
- Harold Wayne King (1901–1985), American musician, songwriter, singer and orchestra leader

== See also ==
- Harry King (disambiguation)
- King Harold (disambiguation)
