= Congressman King =

Congressman King may refer to:

- Peter King (American politician), US Representative from New York
- Steve King, US Representative from Iowa

Angus King is also a member of Congress.

== See also ==
- King (surname)
