= Chris King =

Chris or Christopher King may refer to:

== Sport ==
- Chris King (umpire) (1944–2022), New Zealand cricket umpire
- Chris King (basketball) (born 1969), American NBA basketball player
- Chris King (soccer, born 1969), American soccer player
- Chris King (rugby league) (born 1969), Australian rugby league player
- Chris King (footballer, born 1980), English footballer
- Chris King (rugby union) (born 1981), New Zealand rugby union player

== Other ==
- Chris King (philatelist) (born 1948), British philatelist
- Chris King (geologist) (1949–2022), British geologist and educator
- Chris King (actor) (born 1956), Australian actor
- Chris Thomas King (born 1962), American blues musician and actor
- Christopher J. King (born 1976), Pennsylvania state representative
- Chris King, guitarist for the American band This Will Destroy You
- Christopher King (director), Australian filmmaker
- Chris King, fictional character in the DC Comics universe, see Chris King and Vicki Grant

== See also ==
- Christine King, British historian and university administrator
