= Henry of England =

Henry of England may refer to:

- Henry I of England (c. 1068–1135), King of England from 1100
- Henry II of England (1133–1189), King of England from 1154
- Henry III of England (1207–1272), King of England from 1216
- Henry IV of England (1367–1413), King of England from 1399
- Henry V of England (1386–1422), King of England from 1413
- Henry VI of England (1421–1471), King of England from 1422 to 1461 and 1470 to 1471
- Henry VII of England (1457–1509), King of England from 1485
- Henry VIII (1491–1547), King of England from 1509

== See also ==
- Henry (son of Edward I) (1268–1274), heir to the throne of England from 1272
- Henry Benedict Stuart (1725–1807), Jacobite pretender to the British throne
- Henry the Young King (1155–1183), son of Henry II; crowned junior king of England during the reign of his father
- King Henry (disambiguation)
- Prince Henry (disambiguation)
- Roy Henry (fl. c. 1410), composer probably identical to Henry V
