= Frederic King (disambiguation) =

Frederic King or variants may refer to:

- Frederic King (1853–1933), British baritone singer and voice teacher
- Frederic Rhinelander King (1887–1972), American architect
- Frederic Wayne King, American herpetologist
- Fredric King (born 1958), American film producer and director

== See also ==
- Frederick King (disambiguation)
