= Marcia King =

Marcia King may refer to:

- Marcia Gygli King (1931–2011), American artist
- Marcia Lenore King (1959–1981), American murder victim
