= Anthony King =

Anthony King may refer to:

- Anthony King (basketball) (born 1985), US-born Cypriot basketball player
- Anthony King (English cricketer) (1932–2026), English cricketer
- Anthony King (Barbadian cricketer) (born 1943), Barbadian cricketer
- Anthony King (political scientist) (1934–2017), Canadian-born professor of government
- Anthony King (writer) (born 1975), American writer, director, and comedian

== See also ==
- Tony King (disambiguation)
- King (surname)
