= Larry King (disambiguation) =

Larry King (1933–2021) was an American broadcaster.

Larry or Laurence or Lawrence King may also refer to:

== People ==
- Lawrence Fobes King (1993–2008), also known as Latisha King, 15-year-old student murdered by a fellow student
- Lawrence E. King Jr. (born 1944), former manager of the Franklin Community Federal Credit Union in Omaha, associated with the Franklin child prostitution ring allegations
- Larry King (musician) (born 1966), musician from Chicago and member of Soleil Moon
- Larry L. King (1929–2012), playwright of the stage and film musical The Best Little Whorehouse in Texas
- Larry King (tennis) (1945–2026), former husband of Billie Jean King and a founder of World TeamTennis
- Lawrence King (sociologist) (born 1966), professor of sociology and political economy at the University of Cambridge
- Laurence King (architect) (1907–1981), British ecclesiastical architect
- Lawrence L. King (1922–1997), member of the Florida House of Representatives

== Fiction ==
- Larry King (King of Kensington), title character on the Canadian Broadcasting Corporation television series King of Kensington
- Larry King (30 Rock), an episode of the American television comedy series 30 Rock

== Others ==
- Laurence King Publishing, London-based British publishing company
