= Rufus King (disambiguation) =

Rufus King (1755–1827) was a U.S. Senator from New York.

Rufus King may also refer to:

- William R. King (William Rufus DeVane King, 1786–1853), vice president of the United States
- Rufus King (general) (1814–1876), American Civil War general
- Rufus King (lawyer) (1817–1891), American university president from Cincinnati
- Rufus H. King (1820–1890), U.S. Representative from New York
- Rufus King Jr. (1838–1900), American Civil War officer and Medal of Honor recipient
- Rufus King (writer) (1893–1966), American mystery writer
- Rufus G. King, chairman of the American Bar Association Committee on Narcotics
- Rufus G. King III (born 1942), former chief judge of the Superior Court of the District of Columbia
- Rufus King (band), an alternative rock band active between 1993 and 2000
- SS Rufus King, a Liberty ship
- Rufus King International High School, Milwaukee, Wisconsin
- Rufus King International Middle School, Milwaukee, Wisconsin

== See also ==
- Rufus King Delafield (1802–1874), American banker and manufacturer
