= Catherine King =

Catherine King may refer to:

- Catherine King (radio broadcaster) (1904–2000), Australian broadcaster
- Catherine King (mezzo-soprano) English singer
- Catherine King (politician) (born 1966), Australian politician
- Catherine King (scientist), Australian ecotoxicologist who studies sub-Antarctic and Antarctic regions
- Kaki King (born 1979), American guitarist and composer

== See also ==
- Cathy King (born 1959), Canadian curler
- Kitty King (born 1982) British Olympic eventing rider
- Katie King (disambiguation)
