= Jeff King =

Jeff or Jeffrey King may refer to:

- Jeff King (footballer, born 1953) Scottish footballer, see 1974–75 Derby County F.C. season
- Jeff King (musher) (born 1956), American multiple winner of the Iditarod Trail Sled Dog Race
- Jeff King (baseball) (born 1964), American major league baseball player
- Jeff F. King, Canadian television producer and screenwriter
- Jeff King (bodybuilder), American bodybuilder and former title holder of the Universe Championships
- Jeff King (football manager) (born 1959), English football manager and club-owner
- Jeff King (American football) (born 1983), American football player
- Jeff King (Navajo) (1865–1964), Native American singer (medicine man)
- Jeff King (jockey), British steeplechase rider from the 1960s–'80s
- Jeff King (politician) (born 1975), Republican member of the Kansas House of Representatives
- Jeff King (footballer) (born 1995), English footballer
- Jeffrey King (politician) (1940–2020), Canadian politician, lawyer and priest
- Jeffrey C. King, American philosopher
- Jeffrey R. King, United States Air Force general
- Jeffrey King (One Life to Live), a fictional character from the soap opera One Life to Live

== See also ==
- Geoffrey King (disambiguation)
