= Tony King =

Tony King may refer to:

- Tony King (actor) (born 1947), American actor
- Tony King (businessman) (born 1964), Australian businessman
- Tony King (footballer) (born 1955), former Australian rules footballer
- Tony King (EastEnders), fictional character from the BBC soap opera EastEnders

== See also ==
- Anthony King (disambiguation)
