= Derek King (disambiguation) =

Derek King (born 1967) is a Canadian former professional ice hockey player.

Derek King may also refer to:

- Derek King (Australian footballer) (1948–2014), Australian rules football player
- Derek King (footballer, born 1929) (1929–2003), English football player
- Derek King (footballer, born 1980), Trinidad and Tobago international football player

== See also ==
- D'Eriq King (born 1997), American football player
