= Hercules Networks =

American-based battery charger manufacturer

- Company type: Private
- Industry: Manufacturer, Distributor/Wholesaler
- Founded: 2008
- Headquarters: New York City, New York
- Key people: Paul King, CEO; Michael Gold, Chairman
- Products: Automated Charging Machines
- Website: www.herculesnetworks.com

Hercules Networks is a U.S.-based manufacturing and distributing company. Hercules Networks was founded in 2008, and is headquartered in New York City, New York. Hercules Networks also has an office in Miami, Florida.

Hercules Networks is a manufacturer and distributor of Automated Charging Machines, public charging stations that rapidly charge a variety of devices.

== Background ==
Founded by Paul King and based in New York City, NY, Hercules Networks specializes in Automated Charging Machines, stand up machines that are placed in public areas, much like ATMs are. These machines, also known as ACMs, provide a way for the public in high traffic areas to rapidly charge their devices (around 10 minutes). As their cell phones, PDAs, or mp3 players charge, they are presented with entertainment as well as advertisement, via an LCD screen and/or billboard. The machines take about 10 minutes to charge any number of connected devices.

Partnered with Google, Hercules Networks debuted these patented machines at the Democratic and Republican National Conventions in 2008. Since then, Hercules Networks has been a leading manufacturer and distributor of ACMs in the United States, with dozens deployed in various malls, amusement parks, casinos, and various other venues across the country. Hercules Networks also has partnerships with other companies such as CBS, Six Flags, Battery Boost Media, and AT&T, all of whom are partnering for revenue as well as advertising. Hercules Networks has been featured as finalist on BusinessWeek's Entrepreneur feature, and has received recognition from other major sources such as CNN, VendingTimes, and MediaWeek.

Hercules Networks produces 5 different models of ACMs:

- Troy
- Athena
- Odysseus
- Adonis
- Achilles
