= Rich King =

Rich King may refer to:

- Rich King (basketball) (born 1969), American basketball player
- Rich King (sportscaster) (born 1947), American television sportscaster

== See also ==
- Richard King (disambiguation)
