= King Eric =

King Eric or King Erik may refer to:

== Actual kings ==
- Eric I of Denmark
- Eric II of Denmark
- Eric III of Denmark
- Eric IV of Denmark
- Eric V of Denmark
- Eric VI of Denmark
- Eric Christoffersen
- Eric Bloodaxe
- Eric II of Norway
- Eric the Victorious
- Eric and Eric
- Saint Erik
- Erik Knutsson
- Erik Eriksson
- Erik Magnusson, King of Sweden
- Eric XIV
- Erik of Pomerania
- Eirik of Hordaland
- Eohric of East Anglia

== Legendary kings ==
- Erik Björnsson
- Erik Refilsson
- Eric Anundsson
- Eric son of Ring
- Erik Årsäll
- Eric Weatherhat
- Alaric and Eric
- Erik, brother of Jorund, a Swedish king of the House of Yngling

== Others nicknamed "King Eric" ==
- Eric Cantona, French actor and former footballer for Manchester United and the France national football team
- Eric Gibson, Bahamian musician and entrepreneur
- Eric Abidal, French footballer

== See also ==
- Eric King (disambiguation)
- Prince Erik (disambiguation)
