= Richard King =

Richard King, Rich King, or Dick King may refer to:

== Arts and entertainment ==
- Richard King (artist) (1907–1974), Irish stained glass artist and illustrator
- Richard King (sound designer) (born 1940), American film sound designer and editor
- Ricky King (born 1946), German guitarist
- Dick King-Smith (1922–2011), author of children's fiction

== Military and politics ==
- Dick King (politician) (1934–2018), American politician
- Sir Richard King, 1st Baronet (1730–1806), British admiral, Commodore Governor for Newfoundland and Labrador
- Sir Richard King, 2nd Baronet (1774–1834), son of the above and British admiral who served at the Battle of Trafalgar
- Richard King (MP) (died c. 1640), English lawyer and politician who sat in the House of Commons between 1640 and 1643

== Sports ==
- Dick King (American football) (1895–1930), All-American and early professional football player
- Rich King (basketball) (born 1969), American basketball player
- Richard King (baseball) (1904–1966), Negro league baseball player
- Richard King (English cricketer) (born 1984), former English cricketer
- Richard King (New Zealand cricketer) (born 1973), New Zealand cricketer
- Richard King (footballer) (born 2001), Jamaican association footballer

== Other ==
- Dick King (1813–1871), English trader and colonist
- Richard King (entrepreneur) (1824–1885), entrepreneur and founder of the King Ranch in South Texas
- Richard King (priest) (1871–1958), Dean of Derry, 1921–1946
- Richard King (traveller) (1811–1876), English surgeon, Arctic traveler and early ethnological writer
- Richard E. King, religion professor
- Richard King Mellon (1899–1970), American financier
- Richard King, of Richard and William King, an English merchant company
- Richard King, alias used by missing person Robert Hoagland from his 2013 disappearance to his 2022 death
- Richard King, chairman of the APY lands land council, South Australia, since 2015
- Richard King, character in Loch Henry
- Richard D. King (architect), (1879–1945)

== See also ==
- King (surname)
- Rich King (disambiguation)
- King Richard (disambiguation)
