= Alan King (disambiguation) =

Alan King (1927–2004) was an American comedian.

Alan King may also refer to:

- Alan King (horse racing) (born 1966), British racehorse trainer
- Alan King (guitarist) (born 1945), English guitarist and vocalist with the bands The Action, Mighty Baby, and Ace
- Alan King, Scottish singer, member of Walk on Fire
- Alan King (footballer) (born 1945), footballer for Tranmere Rovers, Ellesmere Port Town and Runcorn
- Alan R. King (1954–2019), British linguist
- Alan King (designer) (born 1997), American businessman and fashion designer
- R. Alan King (born 1963), American soldier and author

== See also ==
- Allan King (1930–2009), Canadian film director
