= Gary King =

Gary King may refer to:

- Gary King (broadcaster) (1934–2019), American radio broadcaster
- Gary King (cricketer) (born 1996), Zimbabwean cricketer
- Gary King (director) (born 1972), American director and writer
- Gary King (footballer) (born 1990), English footballer
- Gary King (political scientist) (born 1958), American political scientist and political methodologist
- Gary King (politician) (born 1954), American attorney and politician
- Gary King (bass player) (1947–2003), American bass player.
- Gary King, main character in 2013 film, The World's End, played by Simon Pegg
- Gary King (golfer) (born 1990), English professional golfer
