= Raymond King =

Raymond King may refer to:

- Raymond B. King (born 1965), American executive
- Jin Yan (1910–1983) or Raymond King, Korean-born Chinese actor
- Ray King (entrepreneur) (born 1964), American entrepreneur
- Ray King (footballer) (1924–2014), English footballer
- Raymond Idoreyin King, Nigerian football goalkeeper who played in the 1984 African Cup of Champions Clubs Final
- Raymond King (navy officer), Commander of the Defence Force (Bahamas) since 2020

== See also ==
- Ray King (disambiguation)
