= Prince Erik =

Prince Eric or Prince Erik may refer to:

- Prince Eric, fictional character from Disney's 1989 animated film The Little Mermaid
- Prince Erik, Count of Rosenborg (1890–1950)
- Prince Erik, Duke of Västmanland (1889–1918)

== See also ==
- Eric Prince (1924–2003), English footballer
- Erik Prince (born 1969), American businessman
- King Erik (disambiguation)
