= J. C. "Sonny" Gilbert Wildlife Management Area =

Wildlife management area in Louisiana

- J. C. "Sonny" Gilbert WMA
- IUCN category V (protected landscape/seascape)
- Location within Louisiana
- Location: Catahoula, Parish, Louisiana
- Nearest city: Sicily Island, Louisiana
- Coordinates: 31°49′02″N 91°45′42″W:
- Area: 7,524 acres (30.45 km^{2})
- Established: 1980
- Governing body: Louisiana Department of Wildlife and Fisheries,
- Website: www.wlf.louisiana.gov/page/jc-sonny-gilbert

J. C. "Sonny" Gilbert WMA

J. C. "Sonny" Gilbert Wildlife Management Area (formally the Sicily Island Hills WMA; also called Sicily Island Hills State Wildlife Management Area) is a 7,524-acre (3,045 ha) wildlife management area in Catahoula, Parish, Louisiana, owned by the Louisiana Department of Wildlife and Fisheries. It is located 6 miles (9.7 km) miles west of Sicily Island. The area contains the 17 ft (5.2 m) high Rock Falls, one of the tallest waterfalls in the state.

== History ==
In 1980, the Louisiana Department of Wildlife and Fisheries (LDWF) purchased 2,021 acres (818 ha), and 4,159 acres (1,683 ha) were donated, to create the Sicily Island Hills Wildlife Management Area (WMA). Between 1984 and 2002, an additional 1,345 acres (544 ha) were purchased.

== Location ==
The WMA is located east of the Ouachita River and Louisiana Highway 559, 6 mi (9.7 km) west of Sicily Island, with Louisiana Highway 8 running along the bottom portion towards Sicily Island. La-913, La-914, and La-915 all provide WMA access. The Boeuf River runs through the northwest corner.

== Description ==
The area in the WMA is rugged rolling hills that range from 35–245 ft (11–75 m) above mean sea level descending to creek bottoms. There are several access roads and ATV trails. The 7-mile (11 km) Big Creek Hiking Trail is on the north end, as well as the 1.1-mile (1.8 km) St. Mary's Falls Trail. The .7 miles (1.1 km) Rock Falls Trail is on the southern end. The LDWF marks the trails with paint and there are signs, but there is still the danger of getting lost. The two camping areas are very primitive; five of the seven venomous snakes in Louisiana can likely be found in the WMA, and insects will likely be a problem, necessitating bug spray.

=== Waterfalls ===
There are three prominent waterfalls within the boundaries of the WMA. These include the 17-foot (5.2 m) Rock Falls (31.82589,-91.75358) on Big Creek—one of the tallest waterfalls in the state—the 10-foot (3.0 m) St. Mary's Falls (31.86790,-91.75319) on Sandy Bayou, and the 5-foot (1.5 m) Sandy Bayou Waterfall (31.86776,-91.75278), a cascading waterfall on a tributary of Sandy Bayou.

=== Game species ===
Game species in the area include white-tailed deer, squirrel, and turkey. Woodcock, rabbit, and raccoon are also plentiful. Louisiana black bear frequents the area and bald eagles and their nests are found in the WMA.

The LDWF arranges a public lottery hunt for turkey in this WMA each year. It also schedules a youth lottery hunt prior to the beginning of the turkey season. A deer season is also provided for youth.

On April 4, 2019, the LWFC passed an emergency declaration, closing several WMA's just before the turkey season slated to begin on April 6, because of flooding. This included the Dewey W. Wills WMA, also in Catahoula Parish, but not the J. C. "Sonny" Gilbert WMA.

== Name change ==
In 2015 the Louisiana State Senate passed a bill urging and requesting that the WMA be renamed in memory of J.C. "Sonny" Gilbert (1922–2014). Gilbert was a member of the state senate from 1960 to 1972, a member of the Louisiana House of Representatives in 1972, and served on the Louisiana Wildlife and Fisheries Commission (LWFC) from 1976 to 1982. The last two years he served as chairman. During his career he served on the National Wild Turkey Federation Board of Directors from 1980 to 1987, as president from 1983 to 1985, and chairman of the board from 1985 to 1987. Gilbert was a cotton and rice farmer, cattle rancher, and founding director of the Jonesville Bank and Trust, which is now the Southern Heritage Bank.

== See also ==
- List of Louisiana Wildlife Management Areas
