= Senator King =

Senator King may refer to:

== Members of the United States Senate ==
- Angus King (born 1944), U.S. Senator from Maine since 2013
- John Pendleton King (1799–1888), U.S. Senator from Georgia from 1833 to 1837
- Preston King (politician) (1806–1865), U.S. Senator from New York from 1857 to 1863
- Rufus King (1755–1827), U.S. Senator from New York from 1813 to 1825
- William H. King (1863–1949), U.S. Senator from Utah from 1917 to 1941
- William R. King (1786–1853), U.S. Senator from Alabama from 1848 to 1852

== United States state senate members ==
- Alvin Olin King (1890–1958), Louisiana State Senate
- Andrew King (American politician) (1812–1895), Missouri State Senate
- Bee King (1866–1949), Mississippi State Senate
- Bryan King (politician) (born 1968), Arkansas State Senate
- Curtis King (politician) (fl. 2000s–2020s), Washington State Senate
- Daniel P. King (1801–1850), Massachusetts State Senate
- Edward King (Ohio politician) (1795–1836), Ohio State Senate
- Frank W. King (1912–1988), Ohio State Senate
- Harry Eubank King (1902–1981), Florida State Senate
- Henry King (congressman) (1790–1861), Pennsylvania State Senate
- Jean King (1925–2013), Hawaii State Senate
- Jeff King (politician) (born 1975), Kansas State Senate
- Jessica King (born 1975), Wisconsin State Senate
- Jim King (politician) (1939–2009), Florida State Senate
- John A. King (1817–1900), New York State Senate
- John A. King (1788–1867), New York State Senate
- John G. King (politician) (born 1942), Massachusetts State Senate
- Johnathan P. King (1794–1860), Michigan State Senate
- Keith King (born 1948), Colorado State Senate
- Leicester King (1789–1856), Ohio State Senate
- Lyman King (1869–1950), California State Senate
- Nancy J. King (born 1949), Maryland State Senate
- Phil King (Texas politician) (born 1956), Texas State Senate
- Ralph E. King (1902–1974), Louisiana State Senate
- Samuel Ward King (1786–1851), Rhode Island State Senate
- Steve King (Colorado legislator) (born 1965), Colorado State Senate
- Steve King (born 1949), Iowa State Senate
- Thomas Butler King (1800–1864), Georgia State Senate
- Tom King (Mississippi politician) (born 1947), Mississippi State Senate
- Wayne Douglas King (born 1955), New Hampshire State Senate
- William King (Maine governor) (1768–1852), Massachusetts State Senate
- William E. King (1885–1967), Illinois State Senate
- William R. King (judge) (1864–1934), Oregon State Senate

== See also ==
- Karl King-Nabors (fl. 2020s), Senate of the Northern Mariana Islands
