= Wisner, Louisiana =

- Town
- Town of Wisner
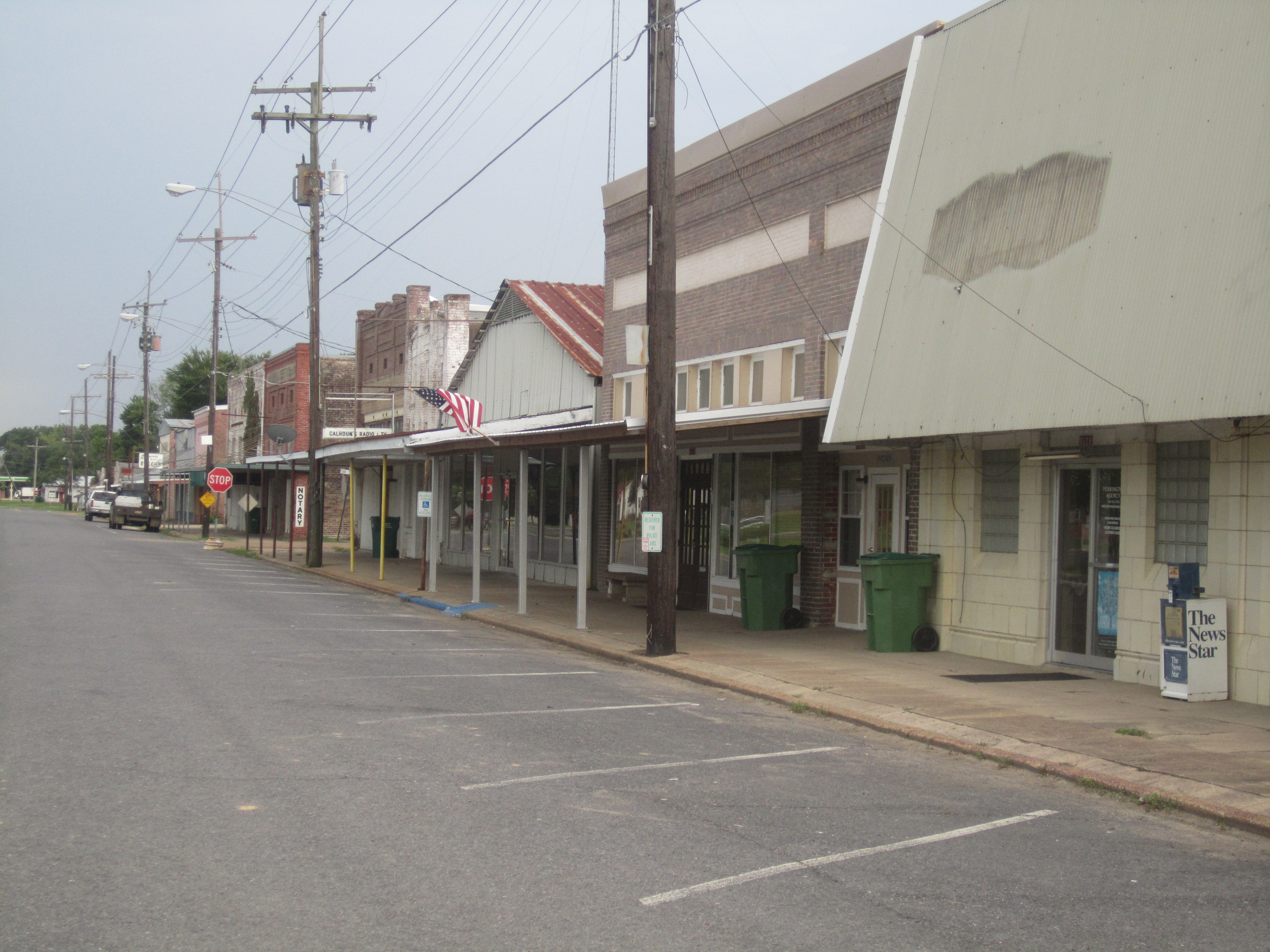
- Downtown Wisner

- Location of Wisner in Franklin Parish, Louisiana.

- Location of Louisiana in the United States
- Coordinates: 31°58′50″N 91°39′18″W
- Country: United States
- State: Louisiana
- Parish: Franklin

Area
  - Total: 0.80 sq mi (2.06 km^{2})
  - Land: 0.80 sq mi (2.06 km^{2})
  - Water: 0 sq mi (0.00 km^{2})
- Elevation: 75 ft (23 m)

Population (2020)
  - Total: 771
  - Density: 968.3/sq mi (373.85/km^{2})
- Time zone: UTC−6 (CST)
  - Summer (DST): UTC−5 (CDT)
- Area code: 318
- FIPS code: 22-82565
- GNIS feature ID: 2406907

Wisner is a town in Franklin Parish, Louisiana, United States. As of the 2020 census, Wisner had a population of 771.

== History ==
Wisner was founded in 1892 by Edward Wisner, a native of Athens, Michigan, whose family came from Switzerland and originally settled in Orange County, New York, in the early 1700s.

== Geography ==
Wisner is located in southern Franklin Parish along U.S. Route 425, which leads north 14 miles (23 km) to Winnsboro, the parish seat, and south 9 miles (14 km) to Sicily Island.

According to the United States Census Bureau, the town of Wisner has a total area of 0.80 square miles (2.06 km^{2}), all land.

== Demographics ==
Historical population
Census	Pop.	Note	%±
1930	692		—
1940	617		−10.8%
1950	738		19.6%
1960	1,254		69.9%
1970	1,339		6.8%
1980	1,424		6.3%
1990	1,153		−19.0%
2000	1,140		−1.1%
2010	964		−15.4%
2020	771		−20.0%
2025 (est.)	742	▼	−3.8%
U.S. Decennial Census

As of the census of 2000, there were 1,140 people, 398 households, and 280 families residing in the town. The population density was 1,435.7 inhabitants per square mile (554.3/km^{2}). There were 456 housing units at an average density of 574.3 per square mile (221.7/km^{2}). The racial makeup of the town was 63.33% White, 35.53% African American, 0.18% Native American, 0.09% from other races, and 0.88% from two or more races. Hispanic or Latino of any race were 1.40% of the population.

There were 398 households, out of which 34.2% had children under the age of 18 living with them, 47.2% were married couples living together, 19.6% had a female householder with no husband present, and 29.6% were non-families. 26.9% of all households were made up of individuals, and 12.8% had someone living alone who was 65 years of age or older. The average household size was 2.57 and the average family size was 3.11.

In the town, the population was spread out, with 26.8% under the age of 18, 6.8% from 18 to 24, 23.5% from 25 to 44, 21.0% from 45 to 64, and 21.8% who were 65 years of age or older. The median age was 40 years. For every 100 females, there were 87.2 males. For every 100 females age 18 and over, there were 81.3 males.

The median income for a household in the town was $21,654, and the median income for a family was $23,929. Males had a median income of $25,938 versus $15,156 for females. The per capita income for the town was $10,528. About 30.2% of families and 38.7% of the population were below the poverty line, including 58.6% of those under age 18 and 18.1% of those age 65 or over.

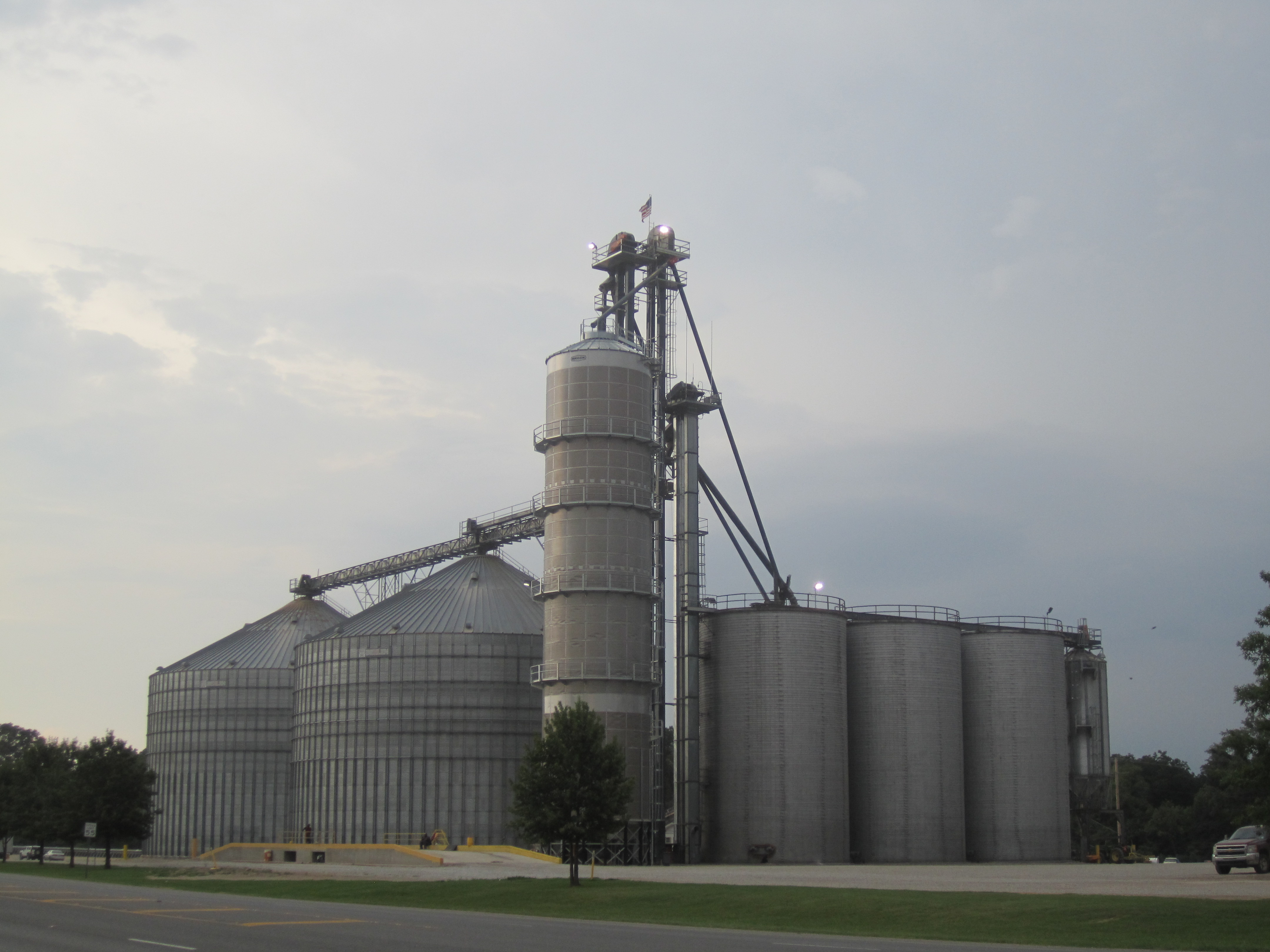
Grain elevator in Wisner

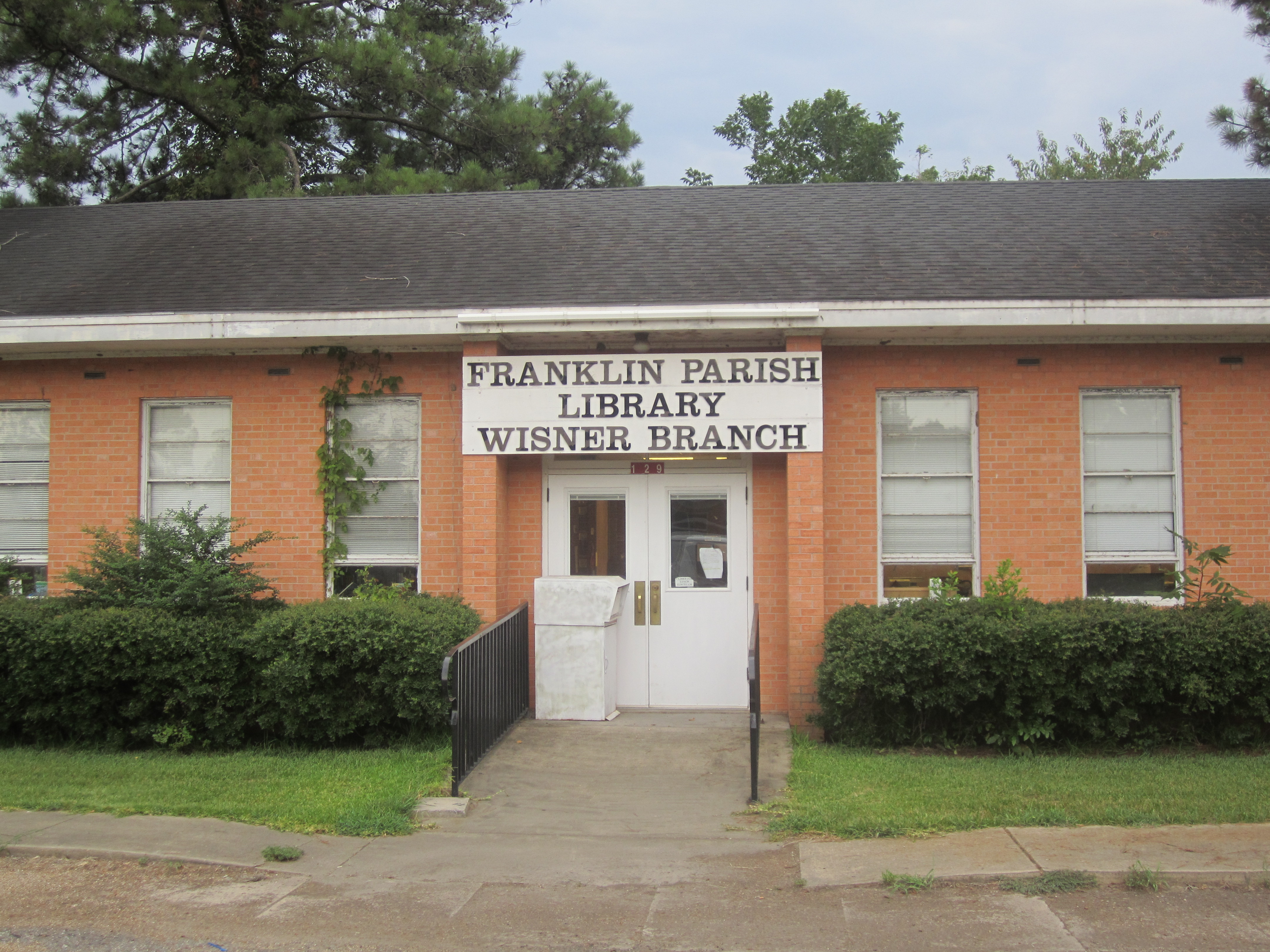
Franklin Parish branch library in Wisner

== Notable people ==
- J. C. Gilbert - politician
- Wayne Watson - Contemporary Christian music artist
