= Harry King =

Harry King may refer to:

- Harry King (cricketer) (1881–1947), English cricketer
- Harry King (footballer) (1886–1968), English footballer
- Harry King (racing driver) (born 2001), English racing driver
- Harry Eubank King (1902–1981), lawyer and state legislator in Florida

== See also ==
- Henry King (disambiguation)
- Harold King (disambiguation)
