= Frederick King =

Frederick King or variants may refer to:

- Frederick King (politician) (1923–2016), Canadian politician
- Frederick Ernest King (1905–1999), British biochemist
- Frederick Gilberts King (1866–1920), American mining engineer, pioneer and oilman
- Frederick King (cricketer) (1850–1893), English cricketer
- Freddie King (1934–1976), American blues guitarist, singer and songwriter
- Fred King (American football) (1912–2003), American football player

== See also ==
- Frederic King (disambiguation)
