= Geoffrey King =

Geoffrey King may refer to:

- Geoffrey King (theologian), English Protestant theologian of the 17th century
- Geoffrey King (composer) (born 1949), British composer of contemporary music
- Geoffrey King (civil servant) (1894–1981), British civil servant
- Geoffrey King (actor), British television actor of the 1950s and 1960s in Miss Mabel
- Geoffrey Peter Thomas Paget King, English Old Catholic archbishop
- Geoffrey King (geophysicist) (1943-2026), British geophysicist

== See also ==
- Jeff King (disambiguation)
