= Fredric King =

American film director

- Born: March 11, 1958 (age 67); New Orleans, Louisiana
- Occupations: Film producer and director
- Years active: 1999-present
- Spouse: Sau-Yin Wong
- Children: 1

Fredric King (born March 11, 1958) is an American film producer and director. He has directed and produced documentaries such as Haiti Redux and Swoon: fearless, a film about the artist Caledonia Curry, also known as Swoon.

== Early life and education ==
King grew up in New Orleans, Louisiana. He made his first stop-motion films at age ten and studied filmmaking at Loyola University New Orleans. After spending time in Austin and San Francisco as a cinematographer and video editor for production companies, he moved to New York City.

== Career ==
King was an executive producer of Sound of Metal (2019), which received six nominations at the 93rd Academy Awards, including Best Picture, winning Best Editing and Best Sound. King helped create the film with screenwriter and director Derek Cianfrance.

King produced his first full-length feature film, Quattro Noza, retitled Streets of Legend in 2003. It won the Excellence in Cinematography Award at the 2003 Sundance Film Festival and received two Spirit Award nominations, Best Cinematography and Best First Feature for King. King produced the documentary B.I.K.E., retitled Bike Club, in 2006. The film features Black Label Bike Club, one of the main contributors to the rise of the tall bike culture.

After the 2010 Haiti earthquake, King produced the documentary Haiti Redux. His next documentary was Swoon: fearless. Over the course of two years, King produced a 25-day shoot of an experimental film called Metalhead, which was later retitled Sound of Metal. Currently, King is working on a fantasy-comedy television series called Kurt Vonnegut: Reporter on the Afterlife, adapted from Kurt Vonnegut's novella God Bless You, Dr. Kevorkian.

King has also directed and produced mini-documentaries including AIDSRides, 3-day Breast Cancer Walks, The American Thoracic Society, Solar4PR, and Swoon's Heliotrope Foundation – Konbit Shelter.

== Filmography ==
Film	Year	Title	Credit	Awards
Feature	2019	Sound of Metal	Executive Producer	2 Academy Awards
Feature	2010	Blue Valentine	Special Thanks	1 Academy Nomination for Best Performance by an Actress in a Leading Role
Feature	2003	Quattro Noza (Streets of Legend)	Producer	Excellence in Cinematography Award, Sundance Film Festival (2003), 2 Spirit Award nominations for Best First Feature and Best Cinematography
Documentary	2017	Swoon: fearless	Director, Producer	
Documentary	2013	Haiti Redux	Director, Producer	
Documentary	2011	Sunchasers	Producer	
Documentary	2011	Vigilante Vigilante	Executive Producer	
Documentary	2006	B.I.K.E. (Bike Club)	Producer	
