= Mervyn King =

Mervyn King may refer to:

- Mervyn King, Baron King of Lothbury (born 1948), British economist, former governor of the Bank of England
- Mervyn King (judge) (born 1937), former judge of the Supreme Court of South Africa and chairman of the King Committee on Corporate Governance
- Mervyn King (darts player) (born 1966), English darts player
- Mervyn King (bowls) (born 1966), English bowls player

== See also ==
- Mervin King (1914–2008), Los Angeles Police Captain
