= Lawrence L. King =

American politician

Member of the Florida House of Representatives from St. Lucie County
- In office 1955–1956

Personal details
- Born: August 12, 1922 Fort Pierce, Florida, U.S.
- Died: June 30, 1997 (aged 74)
- Party: Democratic
- Education: University of Miami

Lawrence L. King (August 12, 1922 – June 30, 1997) was an American politician. He served as a Democratic member of the Florida House of Representatives.

== Life and career ==
King was born in Fort Pierce, Florida. He attended the University of Miami.

King served in the Florida House of Representatives from 1955 to 1956.

King died on June 30, 1997, at the age of 74.
