= Andrew King (professor) =

British professor of English (born 1957)

Andrew King (born 1957) is Professor Emeritus of English Literature and Literary Studies at the University of Greenwich and Fellow of the Institute of English Studies, School of Advanced Studies, University of London ("Professor Andrew King". ). He specialises in nineteenth-century periodicals and popular fiction. From 2019-2022, he was President of the Victorian Popular Fiction Association and is founding co-editor of Victorian Popular Fictions.

== Academic Posts ==
After temporary posts overseas and in the UK, in 2003, King obtained his first full-time academic post. Canterbury Christ Church University appointed him as a senior lecturer in the Media Department. In 2009, after a year's research fellowship at the University of Ghent, he was promoted to Reader in Print History. In May 2012 he was appointed Professor of English at the University of Greenwich.

In 2019, he co-founded Victorian Popular Fictions, the organ of the Victorian Popular Fiction Association, of which he became Acting and then Elected President 2018-2022. In 2025 he became Emeritus Professor.

== Publications ==
His first monograph, which came out in 2004, was on The London Journal,. He soon after edited two collections of primary sources with John Plunkett from Exeter University: Victorian Print Media and Popular Print Media, 1820–1900

Later he guest edited three special numbers of learned journals, including one on Angels and Demons in Critical Survey, another (with Marysa Demoor of the Ghent University) on the Victorian professions, the press and gender in Nineteenth-Century Gender Studies, while the third was on work and leisure in Victorian Periodicals Review.

Collections of essays he has since edited with colleagues comprise Ouida and Victorian Popular Culture (with Jane Jordan) and, with Alexis Easley and John Morton, the Routledge Handbook to Nineteenth-Century Periodicals and Newspapers and Researching the Nineteenth-Century Periodical Press: Case Studies. Both the latter won the Robert and Vineta Colby Prize for the book published during the preceding year that most advances our understanding of the nineteenth-century British press.

King has also published a critical edition of The Massarenes, the last full-length novel by Ouida.

His research on neglected but influential periodicals continued with in 2016 with BLT19, a digitisation project centred on Victorian periodicals concerned with various aspects of work, and with The Edinburgh History of the British and Irish Press, Volume 2, 2020, edited by David Finkelstein and Work and the Nineteenth-Century Press: Living Work for Living People.

He runs a personal website where he blogs on literary, cultural and publishing history.
