= Thérèse King =

Senegalese politician (1934–2015)

- Born: July 15, 1934; Ziguinchor, Senegal
- Died: April 16, 2015 (aged 80); Dakar, Senegal
- Citizenship: Senegalese
- Occupation: Politician
- Known for: Second female Minister of Public Health in Senegal; one of the first women government ministers
- Awards: Grand Cross of the National Order of the Lion (2010)

Thérèse King (15 July 1934 in Ziguinchor – 16 April 2015 in Dakar) was a Senegalese politician. She was the Minister of Public Health from 5 April 1988 to 27 March 1990 under the presidency of Abdou Diouf. She was one of the first women government ministers in Senegal, and the second female Minister of Public Health after Marie Sarr Mbodj.

She also chaired the Ziguinchor Regional Union of Socialist Women.

In 2010, she was made a Grand Cross of the National Order of the Lion.
