= Chris King (soccer, born 1969) =

American soccer player

Personal information
- Full name: Christopher King
- Date of birth: August 19, 1969 (age 57)
- Place of birth: Xenia, Ohio, U.S.
- Position: Forward

Senior career*
Years	Team	Apps	(Gls)
1991–1995	Dayton Dynamo	118	(27)
1995–1996	Cincinnati Silverbacks	5	(1)
1995–1996	Chicago Power	18	(3)
- * Club domestic league appearances and goals

Christopher King (born August 19, 1969) is an American former soccer player who played with various clubs in the National Professional Soccer League in the 1990s.

== Playing career ==
King began his professional career in 1991 when he was drafted by Dayton Dynamo of the National Professional Soccer League. He would play with Dayton for four seasons and appeared in 118 matches, and recorded 27 goals. In 1995, Dayton was purchased and relocated to Cincinnati to become Cincinnati Silverbacks, where he appeared in five matches and scored one goal. Midway through the season he was traded to Chicago Power, and appeared in 18 matches and recorded three goals. In 1996, Chicago was relocated to Edmonton, instead of signing a contract with Edmonton he decided to retire from competitive soccer.

After retiring from soccer he went into coaching and served as technical director for Ohio Premier Women's SC for fourteen years. On December 17, 2013, he was appointed director of coaching for Chicago Eclipse Select.
