= Harold King (rugby league) =

Australian rugby league footballer

Personal information
- Full name: Harold Thomas King
- Born: 31 October 1904 Mullumbimby, New South Wales, Australia
- Died: 17 August 1978 (aged 73) Buderim, Queensland, Australia

Playing information
- Position: Fullback
Club
Years	Team	Pld	T	G	FG	P
1922–23	St. George	18	0	0	0	0
1925	Eastern Suburbs	11	2	0	0	6
	Total	29	2	0	0	6
- Source: Whiticker/Hudson

Harold King (1904–1978) was an Australian rugby league footballer who played in the 1920s.

Harry King came to St. George from Main Arm, near Mullumbimby, New South Wales in 1922 during the club's second season in the NSWRFL. King played his junior football with Mullumbimby Rugby Union Club with his best mate Vic Armbruster. Harry King stayed two seasons at Saints before joining Eastern Suburbs in 1925 for a season before heading back to Queensland to get married in 1926.

Harry King died in August 1978 in Buderim, Queensland
