= Simon King =

Simon King may refer to:

- Simon King (musician) (born 1950), English drummer, former member of Hawkwind
- Simon King (broadcaster) (born 1962), British television presenter, known for wildlife work
- Simon King (footballer) (born 1983), English footballer
- Si King (born 1966), British television presenter, known from the show The Hairy Bikers' Cookbook
- Simon King (cricketer) (born 1987), English cricketer
- Simon King (comedian), North American stand up comic
- Simon King (meteorologist), English meteorologist and Royal Air Force officer
- Simon K. King (born 1986), Indian film composer
- Simonas Babinskas (born 2002), Lithuanian royalty
