= Anthony King (English cricketer) =

English cricketer

Anthony Mountain King (8 October 1932 – 7 January 2026) was an English first-class cricketer, who played one match for Yorkshire County Cricket Club in 1955. A right-handed batsman, he scored 12 in his only innings against Derbyshire. Yorkshire won by an innings and 94 runs in two days. He also appeared for the Yorkshire Second XI in that year.

Born in Laughton-en-le-Morthern in the West Riding of Yorkshire. He died in Lindisfarne, Tasmania.
