= Captain King =

Captain King may refer to:

- Bill King (Royal Navy officer) (1910–2012), submarine commander
- Ernest King (1878–1956), United States Navy officer
- Frank Ragan King (1884–1919), United States Navy officer
- George King (Royal Navy officer) (1809–1891)
- James King (Royal Navy officer) (1750–1784), who served with Captain James Cook
- Norman King (Royal Navy officer) (1933–2013)
- Philip Gidley King (1758–1808), settler of Norfolk Island and Governor of New South Wales
- Phillip Parker King (1791–1856), explorer of Australia and Patagonia
- Sir Richard King, 1st Baronet (1730–1806)
- Sir Richard King, 2nd Baronet (1774–1834)
