= Preston King =

Preston King may refer to:

- Preston King (politician) (1806–1865), American politician
- Preston King (academic) (born 1936), American academic
- Preston King (mayor) (1863–1943), mayor of Bath, England
