= Matthew King =

Matthew or Matt King may refer to:

== Music ==
- Matthew Peter King (c. 1773–1823), English composer
- Matt King (singer) (born 1966), American country music artist
- Matthew King (composer, born 1967), British composer and pianist
- Matt King (Canadian musician) (fl. 2003–2011), member of Canadian indie band DD/MM/YYYY

== Sports ==
- Matthew King (Australian cricketer) (born 1977), Australian cricketer
- Matt King (rugby league) (born 1980), Australian rugby league footballer
- Matt King (American football) (born 1983), American football player
- Matt King (cricketer) (born 1994), English cricketer
- Matt King (swimmer) (born 2002), American swimmer

== Others ==
- Matthew King (Malmesbury MP) (fl. 1553–1558), English MP for Malmesbury
- Matthew King (c. 1712–1737), real name of English highwayman Tom King
- Matthew Leander King (1878–1919), American engineer
- Matt King (politician) (born 1967), New Zealand politician
- Matt King (comedian) (born 1968), British actor and comedian
- Matthew Yang King (born 1974), American actor, voice actor, director, producer, and writer
- Matt King (artist) (1985–2022), American artist and co-founder of Meow Wolf
- Matt King (vlogger) (born 1996), American vlogger, part of The Vlog Squad
- Matthew King (Emmerdale), fictional character in British TV soap opera Emmerdale
