= Harald II =

Harald II (or Harold II) may refer to:

- Harald Greycloak of Norway (died 976)
- Harald II of Denmark (c. 980s – 1018)
- Harold Godwinson of England (c. 1022 – 1066)
- Harald Maddadsson, Earl of Orkney and Mormaer of Caithness (1139–1206)
- Harald II of Mann (r. 1249–1250), a.k.a. Aralt mac Gofraid
