= Susan King =

Susan King may refer to:

- Susan King (novelist) (born 1951), American writer
- Susan King (Texas politician) (born 1952), American politician
- Susan King Borchardt (born 1981), American basketball player
- Rachel Berman (1946–2014), Canadian painter born Susan King
- Susan E. King (born 1947), book artist and writer
- Susan Petigru King (1824–1875), socialite, realist and novelist
- Susan Te Kahurangi King (born 1951), New Zealand artist
- Susan King (journalist) (born c. 1948), journalist and former dean
