= Howard King =

Howard King may refer to:

- Howard King (public-address announcer) (1932–2016), public-address announcer for the Michigan Wolverines football team
- Howard King (Jurassic Park), fictional character from Jurassic Park
- Howard King (referee) (born 1946), English football referee
- Howard King (boxer), American boxer active in 1950s and 60s
- Howie King (born 1969), Irish soccer player
