= Ross King =

Ross King may refer to:

- Ross King (academic) (born 1961), American and Canadian linguist and Koreanist
- Ross King (author) (born 1962), Canadian author
- Ross King (ice hockey) (1919–1972), Canadian gold medal winning goaltender at the 1948 Winter Olympics
- Ross King (presenter) (born 1962), Scottish-American television presenter
- Ross King (singer), Christian singer-songwriter
- Ross D. King, professor of computer science and creator of Robot Scientist
- Ross King (footballer) (1943–2016), Australian rules footballer for Fitzroy
- Ross King (hurler) (born 1993), Irish hurler
