= King Kenneth =

King Kenneth may refer to:

- Kenneth MacAlpin or Kenneth I, traditionally considered as the founder of Scotland
- Kenneth II of Scotland
- Kenneth III of Scotland

== See also ==
- Kenneth King (disambiguation)
