= Gary King (director) =

American director and writer (born 1972)

- Born: November 15, 1972 (age 52); Rochester, Minnesota, US
- Occupation(s): Director and writer
- Website: Official website

Gary R. King (born November 15, 1972) is an American director and writer.

== Films ==
King's feature film, a musical entitled How Do You Write A Joe Schermann Song (2012), won the Jury Prize for "Film of the Festival" at the Raindance Film Festival, as well as the Cox Audience Award and the Dan Harkins Breakthrough Filmmaker Award at the Phoenix Film Festival. The film also won Best Feature, Best Trailer, Best Soundtrack and Best Director at the Idyllwild International Festival of Cinema, as well as being shortlisted for an IFP Gotham Audience Award. The film has also received positive reviews from IndieWire, Empire and Twitch. The film stars Christina Rose (who also appeared in King's previous film, Death of the Dead (2011)), Joe Schermann, and Mark DiConzo (who appeared in King's previous film, New York Lately (2009)).

Aside from How Do You Write A Joe Schermann Song, King has directed four other feature films: Death of the Dead (2011), What's Up Lovely (2010), Dismal (2009), and New York Lately (2009).

The zombie action-comedy film Death of the Dead (2011) received positive reviews from Ain't It Cool News, as well as Sound on Sight magazine. King's other horror film, Dismal (2009), was picked up by Showtime, The Movie Channel, Time Warner OnDemand (VOD) and DVD.

King's film, What's Up Lovely (2010), the first film in his self-described "Loneliness" trilogy, received positive reviews from /Film as well as other sources.

King's feature film debut, the ensemble drama New York Lately (2009), received a positive review from The Independent Critic and was named one of Row Three's Top 10 Films of 2009.

King frequently collaborates with composer Kenneth Lampl, who has scored King's films "Dismal", "Death of the Dead". "What's Up Lovely", "How Do You Write a Joe Schermann Song", and "Unnerved".

== Background ==
King actually spent several years working in the corporate world of Silicon Valley/Bay Area before deciding to move to New York and pursue a career in filmmaking. King also studied psychology in college and began his career in human resources.

King currently blogs and writes articles on film from his official site, "The Indie Life."
