= Mark King =

Mark King is the name of:

- Mark King (musician) (born 1958), singer and bass guitar player with Level 42
- Mark S. King (HIV/AIDS activist and writer) (born 1960)
- Mark King (snooker player) (born 1974)
- Mark King (footballer) (born 1988), English footballer
- Mark King (politician), New Hampshire politician
