= King Henry =

King Henry may refer to:

- Rulers named Henry; see Henry (given name) § Royalty
- Derrick Henry (born 1994), American football running back nicknamed "King Henry"
- "King Henry" (song), a ballad telling a version of the loathly lady folktale
- King Henry (producer) (born 1989), American record producer and DJ
- Blitum bonus-henricus, a plant also called Good-King-Henry

== See also ==
- Henry King (disambiguation)
