= Katie King =

Katie King may refer to:

- Katie King (curator), Manx curator
- Katie King (ice hockey) (born 1975), American Olympic athlete
- Katie King (professor), University of Maryland women's studies professor
- Katie King (spirit), name given by spiritualists to what they believed to be a materialized spirit

== See also ==
- Catherine King (disambiguation)
