= Harald III =

Harald III (or Harold III) may refer to:

- Harald III of Norway (1015–1066), also known as Harald Hardrada ("hard ruler")
- Harald III of Denmark (1041–1080), also known as Harald Hen ("whetstone")
- Harald III, Earl of Orkney or Harald Eiriksson (fl. 1190s)
