= Andy King (footballer, born 1970) =

English footballer

Personal information
- Full name: Andrew John King
- Date of birth: 30 March 1970 (age 56)
- Place of birth: Thatcham, England
- Positions: Striker; defender

Senior career*
Years	Team	Apps	(Gls)
1988–1989	Reading	1	(0)
1989–?	Oxford City	?	(?)

International career
1985	England U16	11	(6)
- * Club domestic league appearances and goals

Andrew John King (born 30 March 1970) is an English former footballer.

== Career ==
King started his career with Reading in June 1988 after coming through their youth team and played one game in the 1988–89 season. He moved on to Oxford City after leaving Reading in 1989.
