= Rax King =

American writer

Rax King is an American writer and essayist. She co-hosts the podcast Low Culture Boil.

== Career ==
King's essay about watching Diners, Drive-ins and Dives while healing from an abusive marriage was nominated for the James Beard Award. She hosts a podcast, Low Culture Boil, and her writing can be found in publications like Glamour and MEL Magazine.

King's second book of essays, Sloppy: Or, Doing It All Wrong, was published in July 2025 by Vintage Books.

== Personal life ==
King lives with her husband in Brooklyn, New York.

== Bibliography ==
- 2021: Tacky (essay collection)
- 2018: The People's Elbow (chapbook)
- 2025: Sloppy: Or, Doing It All Wrong (essay collection)
