= Philip King =

Phil, Phillip or Philip King may refer to:

== Artists ==
- Philip King (playwright) (1904–1979), English actor, author of See How They Run
- Phillip King (sculptor) (1934–2021), British Royal Academy of Arts president
- Philip King (musician) (born 1952), Irish harmonica player, filmmaker and broadcaster
- Phil King (musician) (born 1960), English bass guitarist

== Clergymen ==
- Philip King (priest) (1603–1667), English academic and Anglican churchman
- Philip King (historian) (1925–2019), American Roman Catholic priest and academic

== Explorers ==
- Phillip Parker King (1791–1856), Australian maritime explorer and surveyor
- Philip Burke King (1903–1987), American geologist and mapmaker

== Monarchs ==
- Philippe of Belgium (born 1960), King of Belgium
- Felipe VI (born 1968), King of Spain

== Politicians ==
- Philip Gidley King (1758–1808), British colonial administrator
- Phillip Parker King (1791–1856), son of above, Naval officer and Australian politician
- Philip King (Australian politician) (1817–1904), named Philip Gidley King after his grandfather above
- Phil King (Texas politician) (born 1956), American jurist and legislator

== Sportsmen ==
- Philip King (American football) (1872–1938), quarterback, coach and lawyer
- Phil King (cricketer) (1915–1970), English right-handed batter
- Phil King (American football) (1936–1973), American running back
- Phil King (footballer) (born 1967), English defender and BBC commentator
- Phillip King (tennis) (born 1981), Taiwan-born American player and Hong Kong coach
