= Rufus King (band) =

American alternative rock band

- Origin: Woodland, California, United States
- Genres: Alternative rock, pop grunge, melodic punk
- Years active: 1993–2000
- Past members: Stephen Mott; Octavio Gallardo; Scott Price

Rufus King is an alternative rock band from Woodland, CA. They wrote and performed the song, "Just What I Need", which is featured in the film Bring It On.

== History ==
Rufus King formed in 1993 while they were still attending Woodland High School. Rufus King consists of Stephen Mott on vocals/guitar, Octavio Gallardo on bass, and Scott Price on drums.

After graduating high school, the trio moved to Los Angeles in 1997 where they started playing gigs in local bars and clubs, such as Whisky a Go Go, Coconut Teaszer and Dragonfly. In 1998, they were noticed by Loren Israel who later managed the act.

Rufus King disbanded during the summer of 2000.

== Discography ==
- Morris Termination – 1995
- Anthar and his Many Band – 1996
- Que Onda – 1997
- More than a Lot – 2000
