= Alan King (designer) =

American fashion designer and entrepreneur

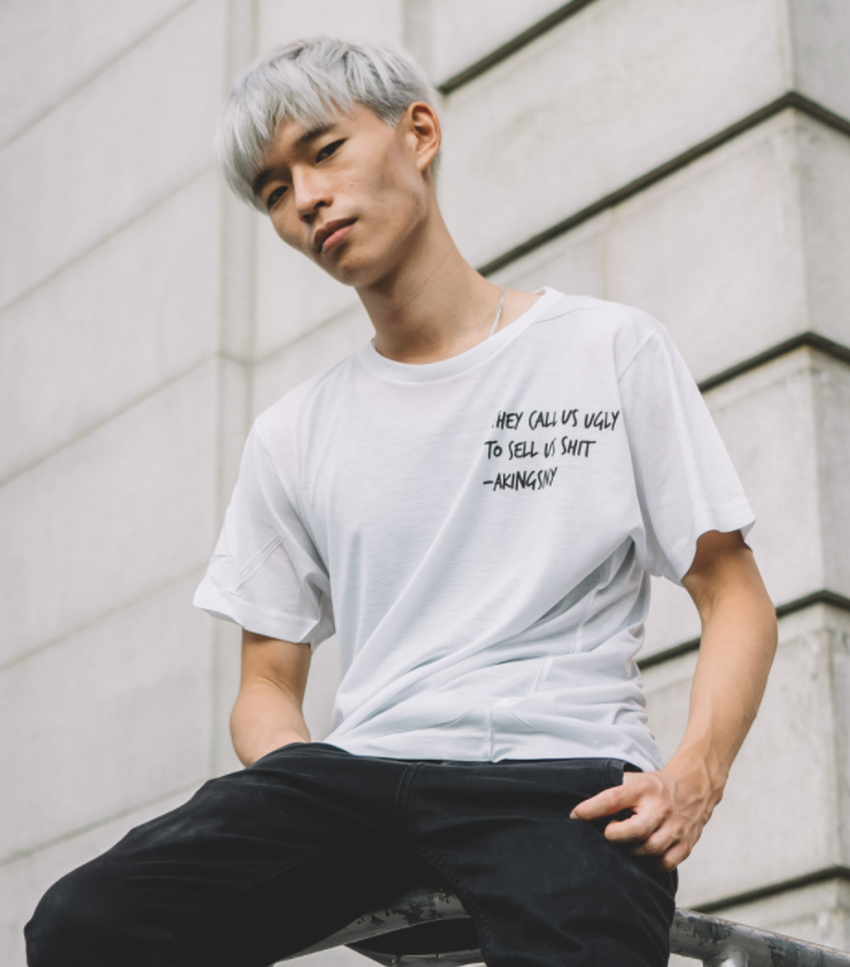
- Born: Alan Cheung
- Occupations: Fashion designer; entrepreneur
- Years active: 2015–present
- Known for: Founder of AKINGS
- Website: akings.com

Alan King (born Alan Cheung) is an American fashion designer and entrepreneur. He is the founder of the New York City–based streetwear label AKINGS. In 2021 he competed on the HBO Max streetwear design competition The Hype, and in 2022 he and AKINGS co-founder Bryan Leon were named to Forbes 2023 30 Under 30 list in the Art and Style category.

== Career ==
King, who is Asian American, began making clothes for himself because he was dissatisfied with ill-fitting hand-me-downs. His designs draw on New York City streetwear with a luxury sensibility. After dropping out of college, he launched AKINGS in 2015. The brand is known for its denim and streetwear, and its pieces have been worn by figures in sports and music, including basketball player Kyle Kuzma and musicians Lil Baby, Lil Nas X, Wale, Steve Aoki and Tyga.

=== The Hype ===
In 2021, King was one of ten designers cast on The Hype, a streetwear design competition that premiered on HBO Max on August 12, 2021. The series was hosted by Speedy Morman and judged by rapper Offset, stylist Marni Senofonte and creative director Bephie Birkett, who were referred to on the show as "co-signers"; contestants competed in weekly challenges for a $150,000 prize. King was eliminated during the season.

== Recognition ==
In November 2022, Forbes named King and AKINGS co-founder Bryan Leon to its 2023 30 Under 30 list in the Art and Style category.
