= Derek King (footballer, born 1929) =

English footballer

Personal information
- Full name: Derek Albert King
- Date of birth: 15 August 1929
- Place of birth: Hackney, England
- Date of death: 16 June 2003 (aged 73)
- Place of death: Huntingdon, England
- Position: Central defender

Senior career*
Years	Team	Apps	(Gls)
1945–1956	Tottenham Hotspur	19	(0)
1956	Swansea City	5	(0)
- * Club domestic league appearances and goals

Derek Albert King (15 August 1929 – 16 June 2003) was an English professional footballer who played for Tottenham Hotspur and Swansea City.

== Biography ==
King attended the Glynn Road School, Hackney. After leaving school aged 14 he trained as a tie maker and played his early football for Alexander Palace football club in 1945. King joined Tottenham Hotspur as a junior in the season of 1945–46. After completing two years National Service serving with the Grenadier Guards he returned to Tottenham and in 1950 he became a full-time player. He made his senior debut in a 1–0 home win against Fulham on 20 August 1951. The central defender made 19 appearances for the Spurs before transferring to Swansea City in August 1956. A resolute player he featured in five matches with the Vetch Field club in 1956 before a recurring knee injury ended his senior career in December 1956. King attempted a comeback at Ted Ditchburn's Romford in 1959.

== Post-football–career ==
After retiring from football King used his skills as a tie maker when he was employed by Spurs legend Dave Mackay at his tie business. He later worked as a school caretaker. At one time he lived adjacent to White Hart Lane at Paxton Road and maintained a close interest in football up to his death at a Huntingdon nursing home in 2003.
