= Eric King =

Eric King may refer to:

- Eric King (American football) (born 1982), NFL cornerback with the Detroit Lions
- Eric King (baseball) (born 1964), former pitcher with the Detroit Tigers
- Erik King (born 1963), American actor

== See also ==
- King Eric (disambiguation) – Kings named Eric and other people called "King Eric"
