= Leonard King =

Leonard King or Len King may refer to:

- Leonard William King (1869–1919), English archaeologist and Assyriologist
- Len King (1925–2011), South Australian politician, lawyer and judge
- Len King (cricket umpire) (born 1941), Australian cricket umpire
- Leonard King (basketball) (born 1966), American basketball player
- Leonard King (drummer), American jazz drummer who played on several albums with James Carter in the mid-2000s
