= Catherine King (scientist) =

Australian ecotoxicologist

Catherine K. King
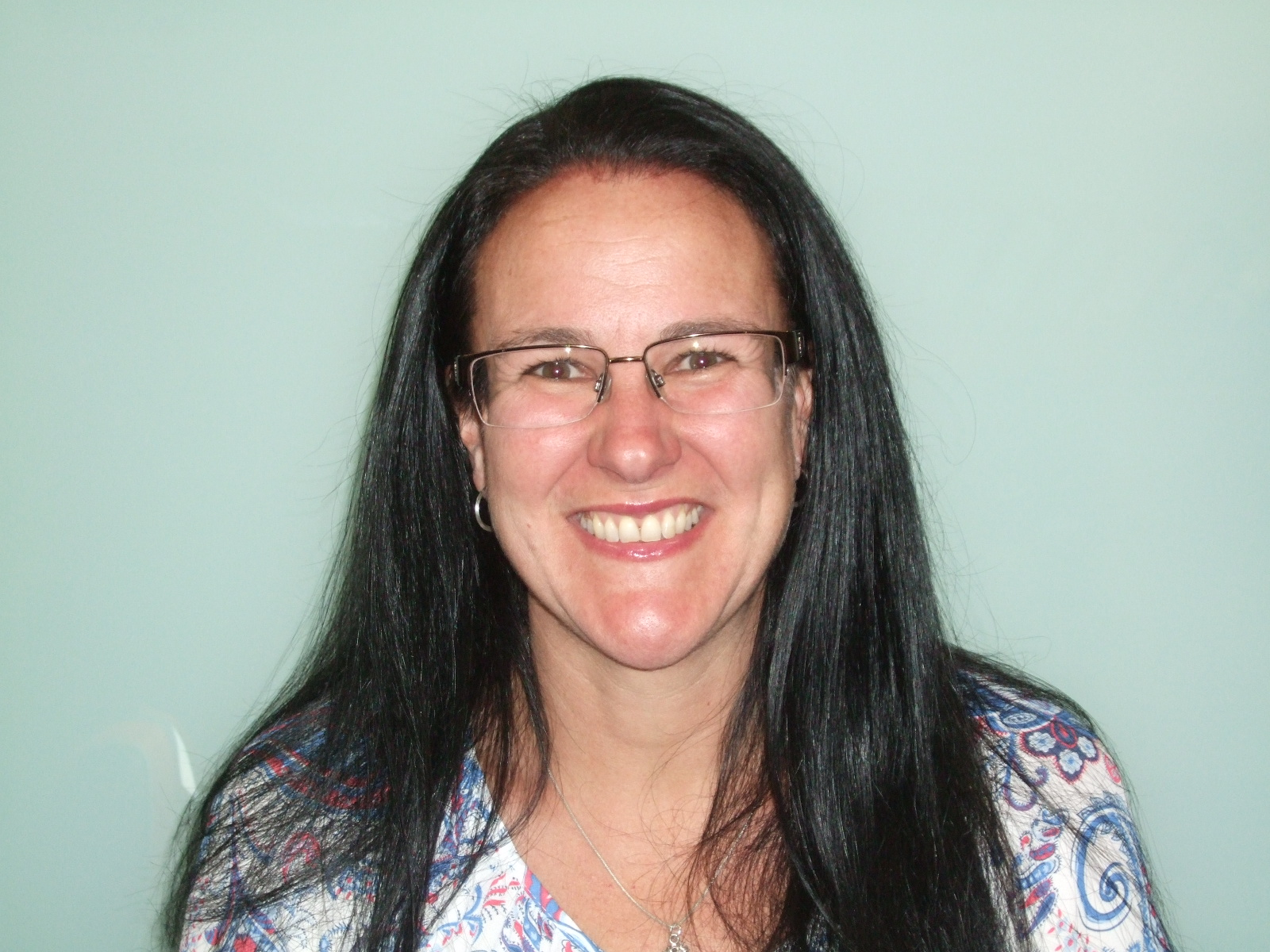
- Education: University of Sydney
- Awards: 2006 CSIRO Medal for Research Achievement
- Scientific career
- Fields: Antarctic ecotoxicology
- Workplaces: Australian Antarctic Division
- Website: Catherine King at antarctica.gov.au

Catherine K. King is an Australian ecotoxicologist who studies sub-Antarctic and Antarctic regions, with a focus on climate change and the impacts of contaminants and environmental stressors in terrestrial and marine ecosystems.

== Career and impact ==
She has supervised more than 30 postgraduate research students.

King's ecotoxicology research program focuses on the ecotoxicity of metals, fuels, contaminant mixtures and other environmental stressors associated with a changing climate, on Antarctic and sub-Antarctic species. Her goal is to develop environmental risk assessment and remediation guidelines for Antarctic and sub-Antarctic marine and terrestrial environments. She contributes to evidenced-based decision making in policy and operations, both for the Australian Antarctic program, and the Committee for Environmental Protection (CEP).

King has also acted as the Manager of the Science Planning and Coordination section at the Australian Antarctic Division, which oversees the administration and governance of all projects within the Australian Antarctic science program. This primarily involves the coordination of project applications, assessments, approvals, planning and reporting, as well as providing research, governance and communications for the Science Branch.

Prior to her role at the Australian Antarctic Division, King was a post-doctoral researcher at the Centre for Environmental Contaminant Research at CSIRO, where her research in ecotoxicology contributed to the Handbook for Sediment Quality Assessment for Australia (2005). King has been working in Antarctic science since her first summer at Casey Station in 1997 where she worked as part of a team investigating the impact of leachates from a legacy waste tip and wastewater discharge on nearshore benthic communities.

== Awards and honours ==
King has been a Chief Investigator and Co-investigator on over 20 Australian Antarctic Science (AAS) Research Grants.

King received the 2006 CSIRO Medal for Research Achievement, for her research advances in assessment and regulation of contaminants in aquatic sediments.

King was part of the CSIRO's Centre for Environmental Contaminants Research (CECR) team that was awarded the Australian Museum Eureka Prize for Water Research in 2006. This was awarded in recognition of the contribution to research advancing the assessment and regulation of contaminants in aquatic sediments.

King hosted and was the Conference Chair for the SETAC-AU 2016 Conference held in Hobart.
