= Ray King =

Ray King may refer to:

- Ray King (artist) (born 1950), artist known for his light responsive sculptures
- Ray King (baseball) (born 1974), Major League Baseball relief pitcher
- Ray King (entrepreneur) (born 1964), American entrepreneur
- Ray King (footballer) (1924–2014), English football goalkeeper
- Vibert Cornwall (1938-2026), Vincentian jazz singer who performed with the stage name of Ray King

== See also ==
- Raymond King (disambiguation)
