= J. C. Gilbert =

American politician

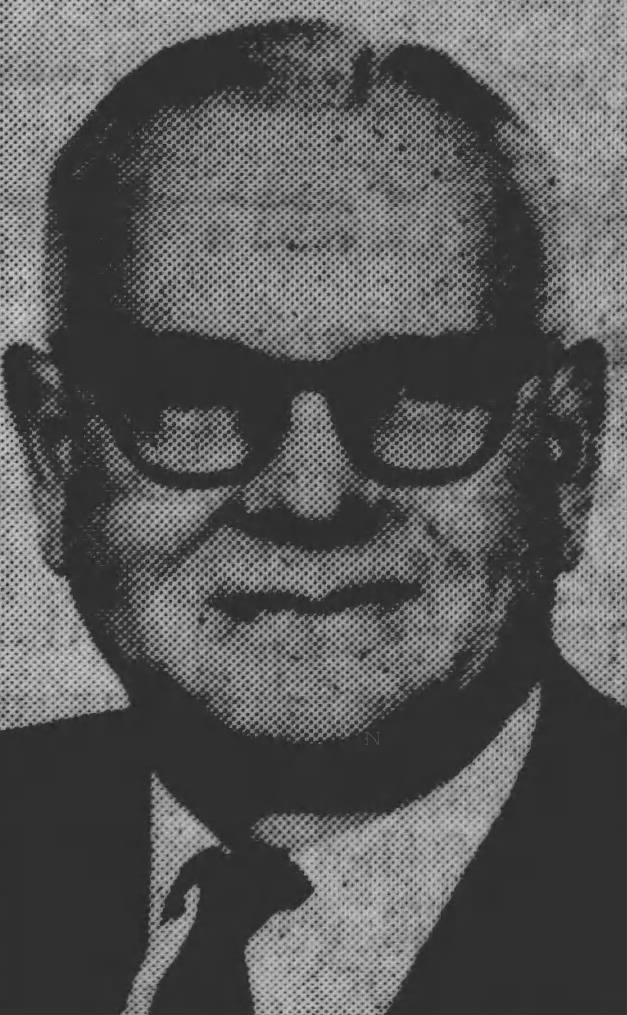
- Gilbert in 1967

Member of the Louisiana State Senate
- In office 1960–1972

Member of the Louisiana House of Representatives
- In office 1972–1976

Personal details
- Born: Jess Carr Gilbert; March 6, 1922 Wisner, Louisiana, U.S.
- Died: November 21, 2014 (aged 92) Sicily Island, Louisiana, U.S.
- Party: Democratic; Republican
- Education: University of Louisiana at Monroe

Jess Carr Gilbert (March 6, 1922 – November 21, 2014) was an American politician. A member of the Democratic Party and Republican Party, he served in the Louisiana State Senate from 1960 to 1972 and in the Louisiana House of Representatives from 1972 to 1976.

== Life and career ==
Gilbert was born in Wisner, Louisiana, the son of Jess Gilbert and Fannie Adams. He attended and graduated from Wisner High School and the University of Louisiana at Monroe. After graduating, he briefly attended Louisiana State University, before enlisting in the United States Army during World War II, which after his discharge, he worked as a farmer, and served as a member of Catahoula Parish Police Jury from 1956 to 1960.

Gilbert served in the Louisiana State Senate from 1960 to 1972. After his service in the Senate, he then served in the Louisiana House of Representatives from 1972 to 1976.

== Death and legacy ==
Gilbert died on November 21, 2014, at his home in Sicily Island, Louisiana, at the age of 92.

In 2015, the Louisiana State Senate passed a bill and renamed the Sicily Island Hills State Wildlife Management Area as the J. C. "Sonny" Gilbert Wildlife Management Area.
