= Martin King =

Martin King may refer to:

- Martin Luther King Jr. (1929–1968), Baptist minister and civil rights activist
- Martin Luther King Sr. (1899–1984), Baptist minister and the father of Martin Luther King, Jr.
- Martin Luther King III (born 1957), Martin Luther King, Jr’s son and a former head of the Southern Christian Leadership Conference
- Dr. Martin King, fictional character in the TV series The Avengers
- Martin King (actor) (1933–2019), British actor and voice actor
- Martin King (inventor) (1950–2010), American co-inventor of T9
- Martin King, Australian former radio announcer on Melbourne Talk Radio
- Martin King (broadcaster) (born 1963), Irish broadcaster
- Martin King (author), British author, co-writer with Martin Knight
- Martin King (businessman), businessman and director of Luton Town Football Club
- Martin King (hurler) (1900–1969), Irish hurler
- Admiral Martin King, abolition rebellion leader in the Danish West Indies
