= Judge King =

Judge King may refer to:

- Alexander Campbell King (1856–1926), judge of the United States Court of Appeals for the Fifth Circuit
- Carolyn Dineen King (born 1938), judge of the United States Court of Appeals for the Fifth Circuit
- Eleanor King (judge) (born 1957), judge of the Court of Appeal of England and Wales
- Garr King (1936–2019), judge of the United States District Court for the District of Oregon
- George H. King (judge) (born 1951), judge of the United States District Court for the Central District of California
- James Lawrence King (born 1927), judge of the United States District Court for the Southern District of Florida
- Lauren J. King (born 1982), judge of the United States District Court for the Western District of Washington
- Robert Bruce King (born 1940), judge of the United States Court of Appeals for the Fourth Circuit
- Samuel Pailthorpe King (1916–2010), judge of the United States District Court for the District of Hawaii

== See also ==
- Justice King (disambiguation)
