= Harald I =

Harald I or Harold I may refer to:

- Harald Bluetooth (c. 935 – c. 985/986), king of Denmark and also Norway
- Harald Fairhair (c. 850 – c. 932), first king of Norway
- Harold Harefoot (c. 1016 – 1040), king of England
- Harald Olafsson (c. 1223 – 1248), king of Mann (or the Hebrides) and the Isles
