= Patrick King =

Pat King (1944–2022) was a Scottish bassist known for his association with Manfred Mann's Earth Band

Pat or Patrick King may also refer to:

- Pat King (Gaelic footballer) (1947–2015), Irish Gaelic football full-back
- Pat King (hurler) (born 1964), Irish hurler
- Patrick King (basketball) (born 1970), German basketball small forward
- Pat King (activist) (born 1977), Canadian far-right activist
- Patrick King, member of the American boy band Natural
