= Tony King (businessman) =

Australian businessman

- Education: Newington College, 1977–1982
- Occupation: Company director
- Title: Managing Director in Australia and New Zealand of Apple

Anthony James "Tony" King (born 21 March 1964) is an Australian businessman who is currently managing director in Australia and New Zealand of Apple.

== Biography ==
King attended Newington College from 1977 until 1982 when he sat for the Higher School Certificate. He has since been awarded a Bachelor of Commerce and is a member of the Institute of Chartered Accountants of Australia. King has been the director of sales for IBM Asia Pacific's personal computer division and has held executive positions at Dell, Ricoh and PwC. King as worked at Apple since 2003. In 2015 he came to the attention of the general public when he appeared before an Australian Senate committee investigating corporate tax minimisation strategies. In the same year he was appointed to Newington College Council.
