= Justice King =

Justice King may refer to:

- Arno W. King (1855–1918), associate justice of the Maine Supreme Judicial Court
- Edwin King (1929–2015), former judge president of the Western Cape, South Africa, who headed the 2000 Commission of Inquiry into Cricket Match Fixing and Related Matters
- George Edwin King (1839–1901), puisne justice of the Supreme Court of Canada
- George Rogers King (1807–1871), associate justice of the Louisiana Supreme Court
- James Lawrence King (born 1927), associate justice of the Florida Supreme Court
- John Hamilton King (1900–1977), associate justice of the Connecticut Supreme Court
- John W. King (1916–1996), associate justice and chief justice of the New Hampshire Supreme Court
- Len King (1925–2011), puisne justice and chief justice of the Supreme Court of South Australia
- Leslie D. King (born 1949), associate justice of the Mississippi Supreme Court
- Peter King, 1st Baron King (c. 1669–1734), chief justice of the Common Pleas and Lord Chancellor of England
- William H. King (1863–1949), associate justice of the Utah Supreme Court
- William R. King (judge) (1864–1934), associate justice of the Oregon Supreme Court

== See also ==
- Judge King (disambiguation)
