= Billy Boles (politician) =

American lawyer and politician

Member of the Louisiana State Senate
- In office 1952–1956
- Preceded by: Ralph E. King
- Succeeded by: Ralph E. King

Personal details
- Born: April 30, 1927 Rayville, Louisiana, U.S.
- Died: August 16, 2008 (aged 81)
- Party: Democratic
- Spouse: Catherine Furlow
- Children: 4
- Education: University of Louisiana at Monroe; Louisiana Tech University; Louisiana State University
- Occupation: Lawyer

Billy Boles (April 30, 1927 – August 16, 2008) was an American lawyer and politician. He served as a Democratic member of the Louisiana State Senate.

== Life and career ==
Boles was born in Rayville, Louisiana. He attended the University of Louisiana at Monroe, Louisiana Tech University and Louisiana State University.

In 1952, Boles was elected to the Louisiana State Senate, succeeding Ralph E. King. He served until 1956, when he was succeeded by King.

In 2004, Boles was inducted into the Louisiana Political Museum and Hall of Fame.

Boles died on August 16, 2008, at the age of 81.
