= Nancy King =

Nancy King may refer to:

- Nancy J. King (born 1949), American politician
- Nancy King (baseball), American AAGPBL player
- Nancy King (jazz singer) (1940–2025), American jazz singer
- Nancy King (netball), netball player from New Zealand
- Nancy King, a Chippewa and Potawatomi artist, known as Chief Lady Bird professionally
