= Chris King (philatelist) =

British philatelist

Christopher Miles Bertram King (born November 1948) is a British philatelist who in 2014 was elected to the Roll of Distinguished Philatelists. King is a specialist in the philately of Scandinavia, particularly Schleswig.

King is keeper of the Roll of Distinguished Philatelists and was President of the Royal Philatelic Society London in 2014.
