= Paul King (entrepreneur) =

American technology innovator and entrepreneur

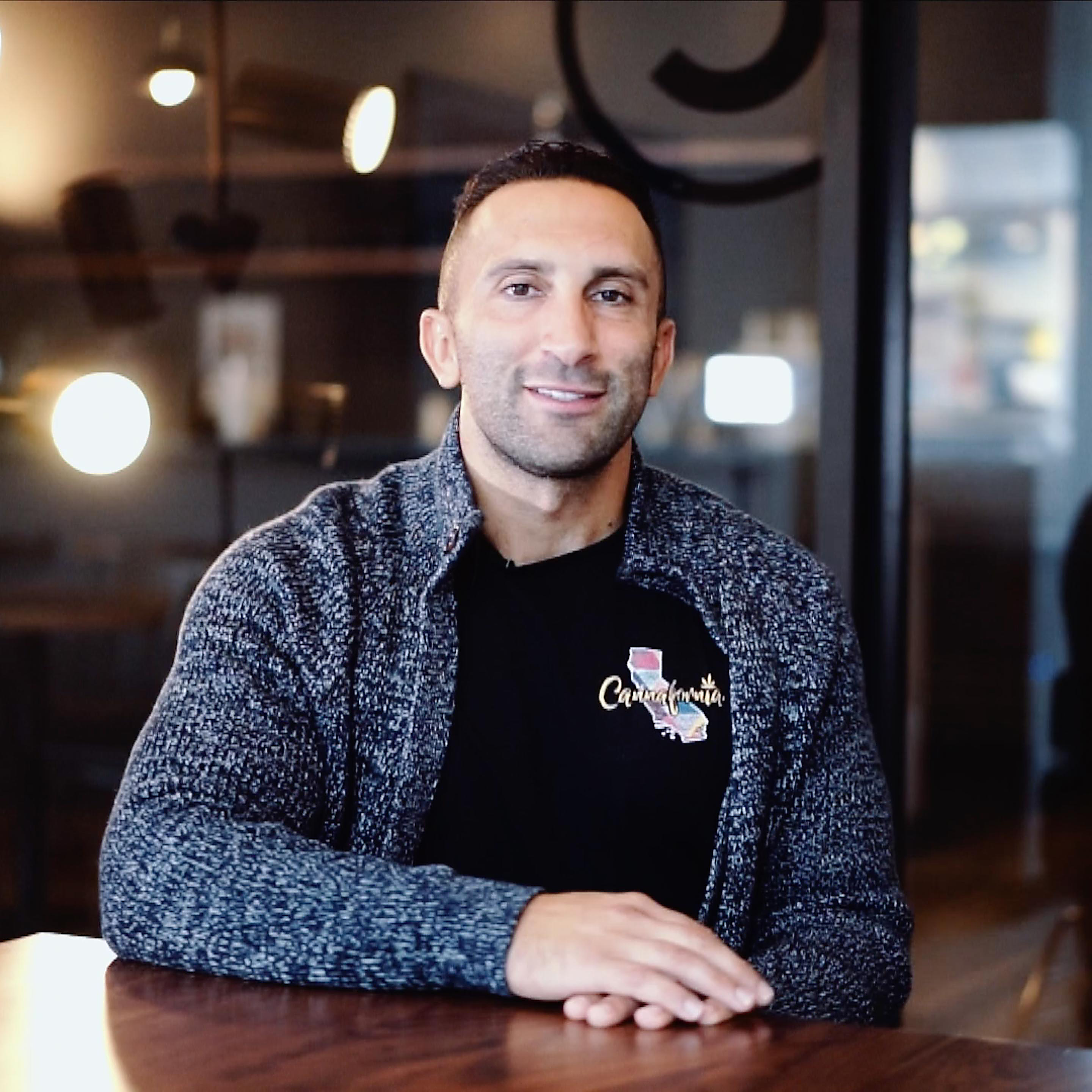
- Born: Paul Michael King; May 26, 1984 (age 42); Moscow, Russia
- Citizenship: Russian (1984 - 1988); American (since 1988)
- Education: Carnegie Mellon University
- Occupations: Founder and CEO, Cannafornia, entrepreneur, technology innovator
- Website: www.cannafornia.world

Paul King (born May 26, 1984) is a business executive and entrepreneur. King was the founder and chief executive officer of Cannafornia. Prior to Cannafornia, King was founder and chief executive officer of Hercules Networks, as well as a member of the board and founding partner at G.C. Media, Inc. Earlier in his career he was the founder and C.E.O. of International Sales Team Realty. King expanded International Sales Team Realty by developing Chase Mortgage Center and New Wave Title Company.

In the late 2000s', King developed and marketed a commercially successful lines of mobile charging stations, known as goCharge stations. King came up with the idea when a dead cell phone caused him to miss a flight during his college years.

King has been featured on CNN News, NBC, BusinessWeek, MediaWeek, and has been quoted and featured on a number of news and media outlets. He is a summa cum laude graduate of Carnegie Mellon University.

In 2017 King founded Cannafornia, cannabis cultivation company. Cannafornia has 200,000 square feet of greenhouse space on two properties in Salinas, California. This includes 35,000 square feet of nursery space where the company breeds its own strains. Across its brands and 13 user accounts, Cannafornia has more than 1 million followers on social media.
On September 14, 2021 Paul King was removed as director and officer of the Board of Big Hugs Holdings, Inc. The request to remove King from his role on the Board comes after multiple lawsuits and investigations have been filed against the executive and his businesses.
