= Ian King =

Ian King may refer to:

- Ian King (businessman) (born 1956), BAE Systems executive
- Ian King (Australian cricketer) (born 1943), former Australian first-class cricketer
- Ian King (English cricketer) (1931–2020), former English first-class cricketer
- Ian King (footballer) (1937–2016), Scottish footballer and former Leicester City player
- Ian King (journalist), English journalist
- Ian King (rugby union), English international rugby union player
