= Hannah T. King =

American poet

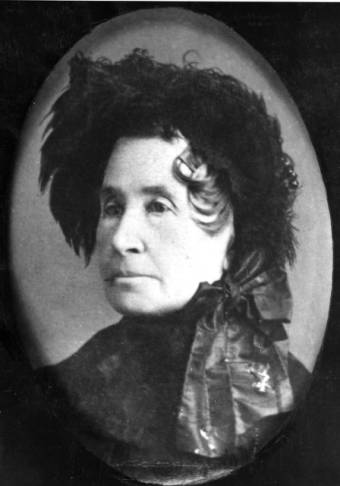
- Born: Hannah Dorcas Tapfield; 16 March 1808; Sawston, Cambridgeshire, England
- Died: September 23, 1886 (aged 78); Salt Lake City, Utah, U.S.
- Occupations: Writer, pioneer
- Spouse(s): Thomas Owen King (m. 1824; died 1874) Brigham Young (m. 1872)
- Children: 11

Hannah Dorcas Tapfield King (16 March 1808 – 25 September 1886) was a 19th-century British-born American writer and pioneer. After converting to the Church of Jesus Christ of Latter-day Saints (LDS Church) in England in 1850, her family emigrated to Utah in 1853 where she became endeared to the people of that state. She was the author of Songs of the Heart, several poems, and writings addressed to young readers. She was the last of 56 women sealed to Brigham Young.

== Personal life ==
=== England ===
Hannah Dorcas Tapfield was born on March 16, 1808 in Sawston, Cambridgeshire, England to Peter Tapfield (1777-1853) and Mary Lawson Tapfield (1772-1854). Her parents were devoted members of the Church of England and her grandfather was a rector of that church. Her early days were spent in Cambridge.

She married Thomas Owen King Sr (1800–1874) on April 6, 1824, in England. Thomas worked as a farmer on the Dernford Dale Farm. Of their eleven children, only four survived to adulthood: Georgiana King (1830-1853), Louisa Helen King (1833-1912), Bertha Mary King (1835-1912), and Thomas Owen King Jr (1840-1921).

She was baptized a member of the LDS Church on November 4, 1850 in England by Joseph Watkins Johnson Jr (1815-1887). Prior to her baptism, she had read the Book of Mormon (1830), A Voice of Warning (1837) by Parley P. Pratt, and Divine Authority or the Question Was Joseph Smith Sent of God? (1848) by Orson Pratt. After her baptism, she heard Lorenzo Snow preach in Cambridge, England on May 25, 1851; and met British mission president Franklin D. Richards in Norwich, England on July 26, 1851.

Of her life and connections with Mormonism she said:

"In 1849, while living in my home in Dernford Dale, Cambridgeshire, England, my attention was first brought to the serious consideration of Mormonism by my seamstress [Lois Lock Bailey (1816-1852)]. She was a simpleminded girl; but her tact and respectful ingenuity in presenting the subject won my attention, and I listened, not thinking or even dreaming that her words were about to revolutionize my life. I need not follow up the thread of my thought thereafter; how I struggled against the conviction that had seized my mind; how my parents and friends marveled at the prospect of my leaving the respectable church associations of a lifetime and uniting with 'such a low set'; how I tried to be content with my former belief, and cast the new out of mind, but all to no purpose. Suffice it to say, I embraced the gospel, forsook the aristocratic associations of the 'High Church' congregation with which I had long been united, and became an associate with the poor and meek of the earth. I was baptized Nov. 4th, 1850, as was also my beloved daughter [Georgiana King (1830-1853)]. My good husband [Thomas], although not persuaded to join the church, consented to emigrate with us to Utah, which we did in the year 1853, bringing quite a little company with us at Mr. King's expense."

=== Utah ===
With her husband Thomas (who never joined the LDS Church), and their four surviving children, she left Liverpool, England on January 25, 1853. The travelled with 321 other Mormons on the Golconda to emigrate to New Orleans, Louisiana in America. After traveling up the Mississippi River, they left Keokuk, Iowa on May 27, 1853, with other Mormon pioneers of the Claudius Victor Spencer Company headed for Utah. Spencer had been her son-in-law since marrying her daughter Georgiana in 1852. Enroute, she suffered from mountain fever and survived a covered wagon accident when it rolled over while she was riding in it. They arrived in Salt Lake City, Utah on September 18, 1853.

=== Sealing to Brigham Young ===
She had been pleased to sit beside and dance with church president Brigham Young (who had arrived in Utah in 1847 with the first Mormon pioneers) in 1856.

Her husband, Thomas, was not a member of the LDS Church which held that she could only secure exaltation through sealing with a "righteous man". Therefore, she (64 years old) was sealed to Young (71 years old) on December 8, 1872, in the Endowment House in Salt Lake City as his last of 56 wives. She also received her “Second Endowments” on that same day.

She continued to live with her husband, Thomas, and never cohabitated with Young. Her sealing to Young was an intention for a union only in the afterlife.

Young sent her flour, cornmeal, sago and sugar as gifts in 1874.

On at least one occasion she included Young as part of her name when she wrote a letter to Brigham Young on June 30, 1875 and signed it as “Hannah T. K. Young”.

She died in Salt Lake City on September 25, 1886 and was buried in the Salt Lake City Cemetery (plot E-8-4).

== Career ==
=== England ===
She was a literary woman and one of the personal correspondents of the English poet Eliza Cook. Her connection with the LDS Church brought her a respectability in the Cambridge Branch.

=== Utah ===
King's poems suggest her love of exalted subjects and noble characters. She was enchanted with the part of Queen Isabella and the mission of Columbus. She wished that she could be an Isabella and find and fund a Columbus.

King created pieces for the Polysophical Society of Salt Lake, founded by the siblings Eliza R. Snow and Lorenzo Snow, as well as other societies and the press. An admirer of the English poet Eliza Cook, King indulged her feelings mainly in that direction, publishing in 1879, Songs of the Heart.

The Juvenile Instructor contained many of her most sympathetic writings for children and the youth of Utah. In the pages of the Woman's Exponent, her work was in a different field. Tullidge's Magazine contained her historical prose contributions.

King wrote of Ferdinand and Isabella, of Columbus, Salvator Rosa and Disraeli, Napoleon and Josephine, Victoria and Elizabeth, the last of whom she somewhat resembled at times in an imperious manner, though her usual mode was one of sympathy, and her nature, one capable of enduring attachment, and unfaltering love. The women of Scripture was also a theme of hers for thought; she published a volume on this topic. In the line of poetry, she considered the "Epic" of the Gospel as her crowning work.

== Image gallery ==
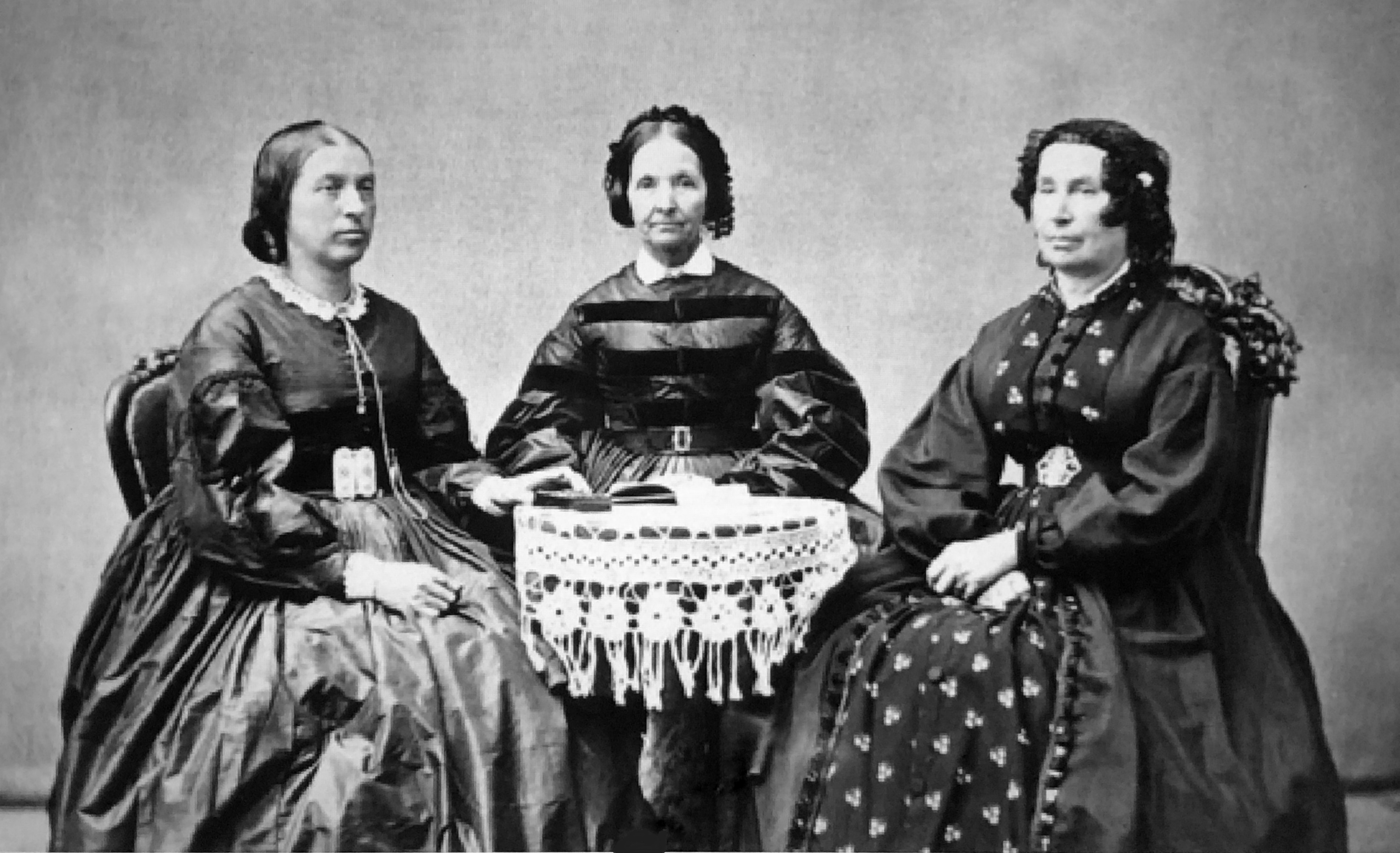
Elizabeth Anderson Howard (1823-1883), Eliza Roxey Snow and Hannah Dorcas Tapfield King in 1865-1873

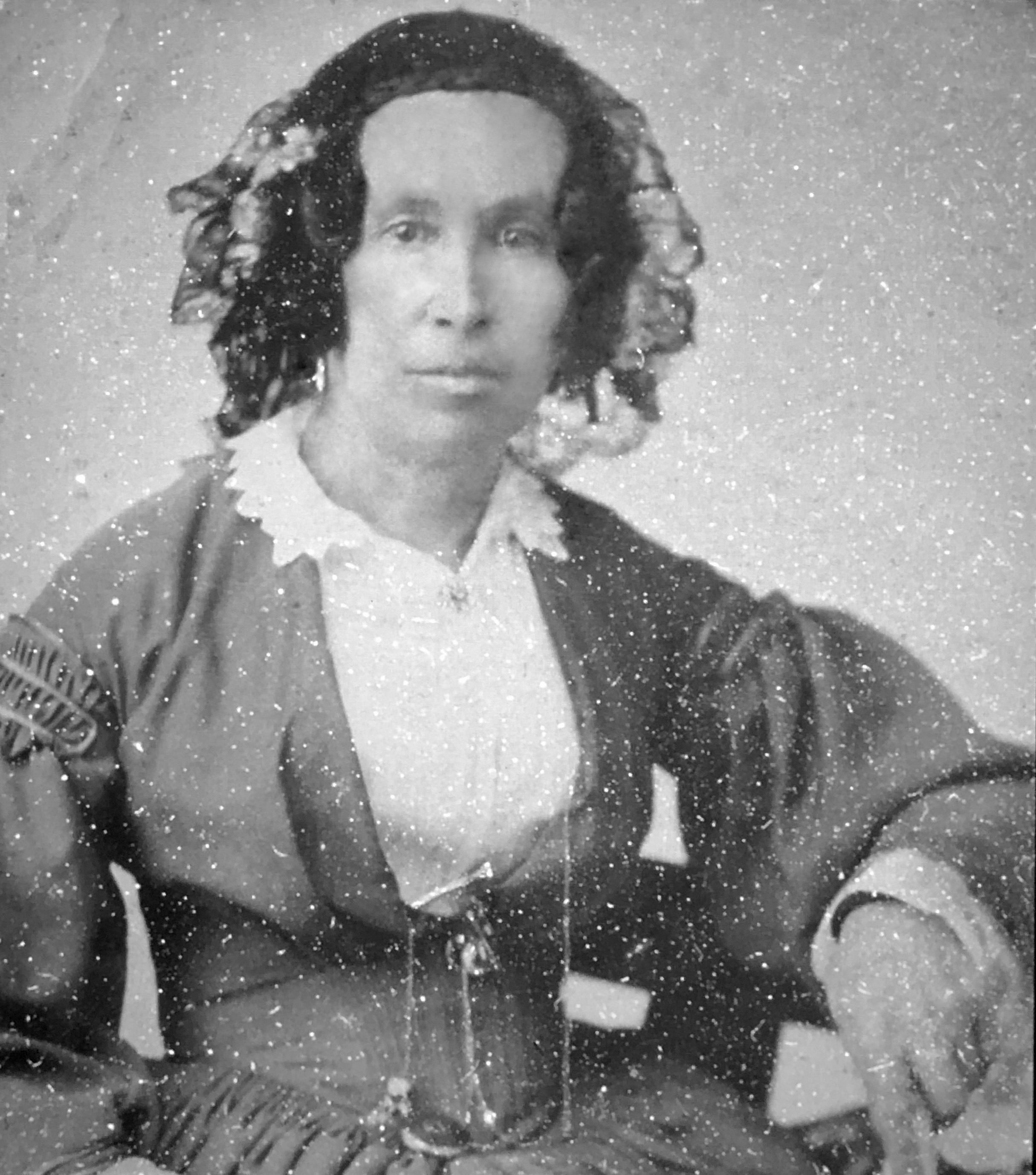
Hannah Dorcas Tapfield King

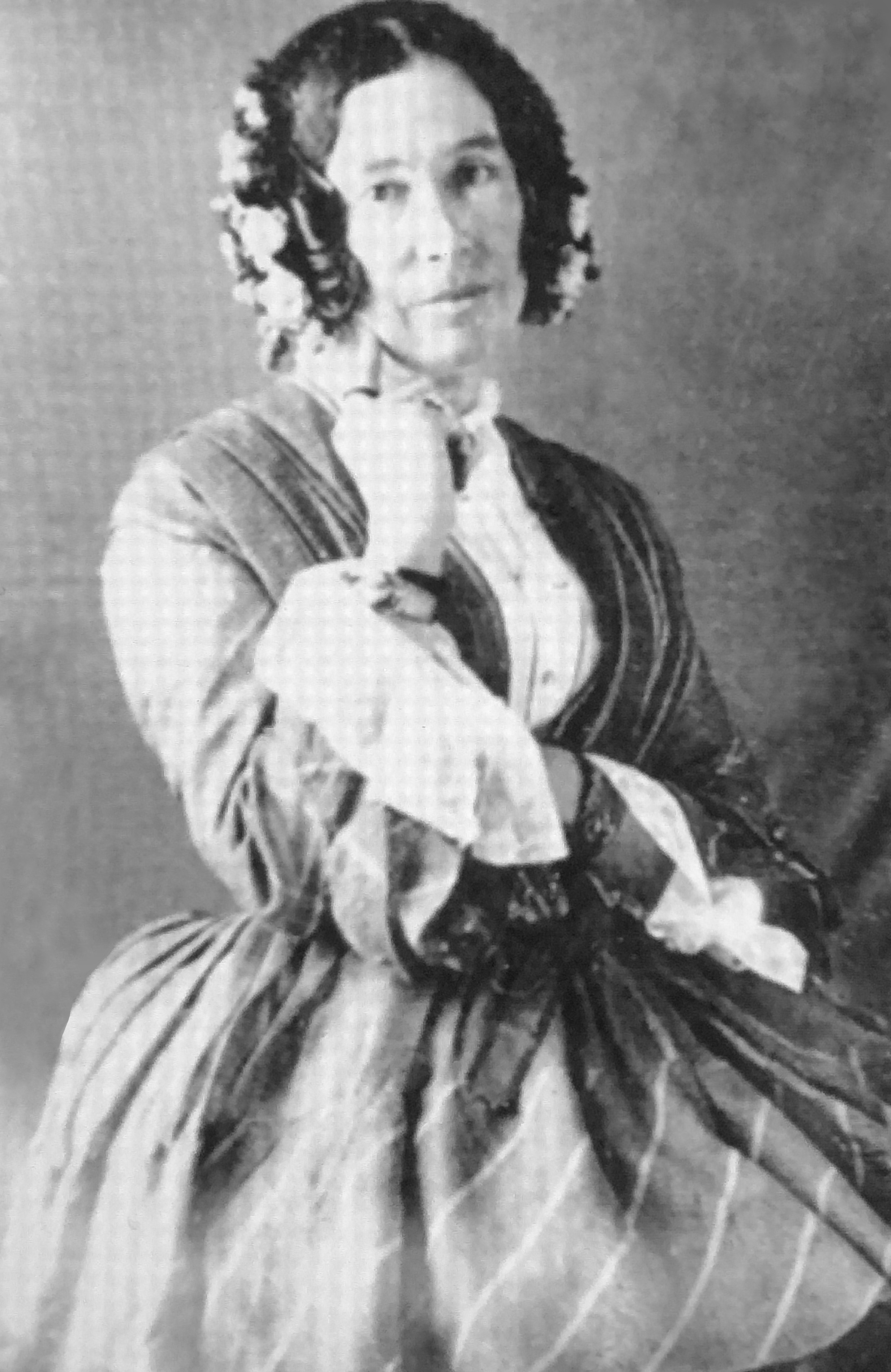
Hannah Dorcas Tapfield King (1850)

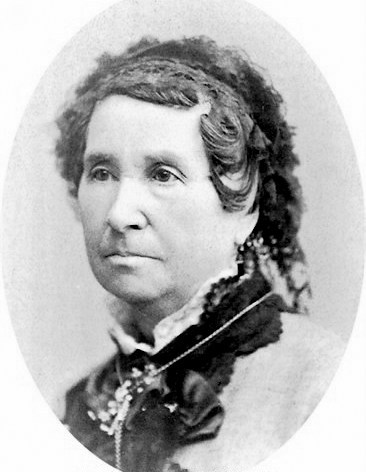
Hannah Dorcas Tapfield King (1870)

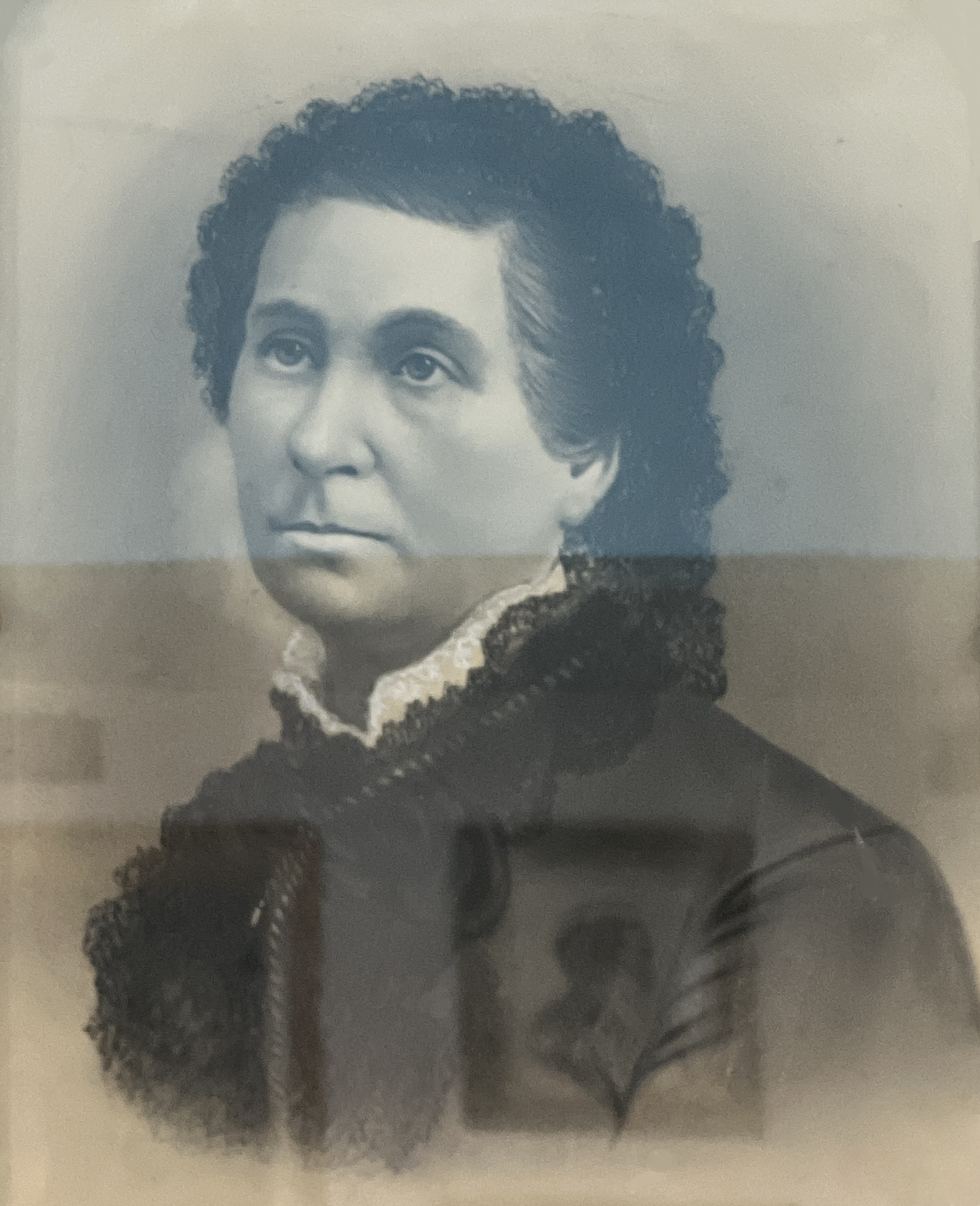
Hannah Dorcas Tapfield King in Pioneer Memorial Museum

== Selected works ==
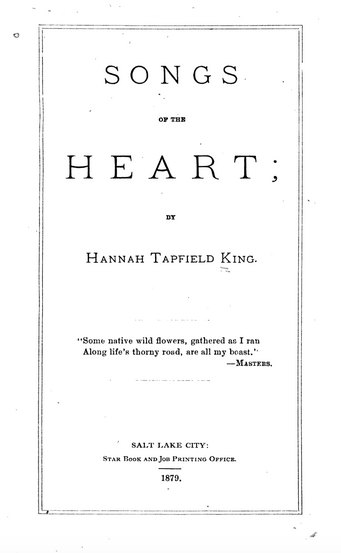
Songs of the Heart

- Essay on young women's manners, c. 1835
- Sabbath musings, ca. 1837
- Proceedings in mass meeting of the ladies of Salt Lake City : to protest against the passage of Cullom's Bill, January 14, 1870., 1870, with Bathsheba W Bigler Smith; Eliza R Snow; Harriet Cook Young; Phoebe Woodruff
- The women of the scriptures, 1878
- Songs of the Heart, 1879
- Hannah T. King brief memoir of the early Mormon life of ... : Salt Lake City : ms. S, 1880.
- Letter to a friend, 1881
- An epic poem : a synopsis of the rise of the Church of Jesus Christ of Latter-Day Saints, from the birth of the Prophet Joseph Smith to the arrival on the spot which the prophet Brigham Young pronounced to be the site of the future Salt Lake City
- The journals of Hannah Tapfield King

== See also ==
- List of Brigham Young's wives
