= Jeffrey C. King =

American philosopher

Education
- Education: University of California, San Diego (PhD)
- Doctoral advisor: Zeno Vendler, Mark Wilson

Philosophical work
- Era: 21st-century philosophy
- Region: Western philosophy
- Institutions: Rutgers University (2007–present); University of Southern California (2004–2007); University of California, Davis (1991–2004); California State University, San Bernardino (1985–1990)
- Main interests: Philosophy of language, formal semantics, philosophical logic, metaphysics

Jeffrey C. King is an American philosopher and distinguished professor of Philosophy at Rutgers University. He is known for his works on philosophy of language.

== Books ==
- Felicitous Underspecification: Contextually Sensitive Expressions Lacking Unique Semantic Values in Context, Oxford University Press, 2021, 176pp., ISBN 9780192857057
- New Thinking about Propositions, co-authored with Scott Soames and Jeff Speaks, Oxford University Press, 2014, ISBN 9780199693764
- The Nature and Structure of Content, Oxford University Press, 2007, 230pp., ISBN 9780199226061
- Complex Demonstratives: A Quantificational Account. MIT Press. 200, 221pp., ISBN 9780262611695
