= Helen King =

Helen King may refer to:

- Helen King (actress) (born 1972), Canadian actress
- Helen King (police officer) (born 1965), British police officer
- Helen King (classicist) (active since 1993), British academic
- Helen Dean King (1869–1955), American biologist
- Helen King (oncologist) (?–2015), South African oncologist and anti-apartheid campaigner
