= Peter King (Gaelic footballer) =

Irish Gaelic footballer

Personal information
- Native name: Peadar Ó Cionga (Irish)
- Born: 1983 (age 42–43) Ballina, County Tipperary, Ireland

Sport
- Sport: Gaelic football
- Position: Left corner-back
Clubs
- Years: Club
- Ballina; Monaleen
Club titles
- Limerick titles: 1
Inter-county
- Years: County
- 2005-2007: Tipperary
Inter-county titles
- Munster titles: 0
- All-Irelands: 0
- NFL: 0
- All Stars: 0

Peter King (born 1983) is an Irish Gaelic footballer who played as a left corner-back for the Tipperary senior team.

Born in Ballina, County Tipperary, King first arrived on the inter-county scene at the age of seventeen when he first linked up with the Tipperary minor team before later joining the under-21 side. He joined the senior panel during the 2005 championship. King immediately became a regular member of the starting fifteen and won one Tommy Murphy Cup medal.

At club level King is a one-time championship medallist with Monaleen.

King retired from inter-county football following the conclusion of the 2007 championship.

== Honours ==
=== Player ===
Monaleen

- Limerick Senior Football Championship (1): 2010

Tipperary

- Tommy Murphy Cup (1): 2005
