= Henry King =

Henry King may refer to:

== Arts and entertainment ==
- Henry King (poet) (1592–1669), English poet, bishop of Chichester
- Henry John King (1855–1934), Australian composer
- Henry King (photographer) (c. 1855–1923), English-born Australian photographer
- Henry John Yeend King (1855–1924), British painter
- Henry King (director) (1886–1982), American film director
- Henry King (musician) (1906–1974), American orchestra leader and pianist

== Law and politics ==
- Sir Henry King, 3rd Baronet (1681–1740), Anglo-Irish politician
- Henry King (died 1821) (1733–1821), Anglo-Irish politician
- Henry King (British Army officer) (1776–1839), British Army officer and politician
- Henry King (Pennsylvania politician) (1790–1861), U.S. representative from Pennsylvania
- Henry W. King (1815–1857), American politician in Ohio
- Henry King (police officer) (1832–?), American chief of police in California
- Henry Edward King (1832–1910), Australian politician in colonial Queensland
- Seymour King (Henry Seymour King, 1852–1933), English politician
- Henry T. King (1919–2009), American attorney and war crimes prosecutor

== Others ==
- Henry King (pirate) (fl. 1699), English pirate captain
- H. R. King (Henry R. King, 1820s–1903), British trade union leader
- Sir Henry King (cricketer) (1857–1920), English cricketer and solicitor
- Henry Churchill King (1858–1934), American theologian and educator
- Henry Sandford King (1862–1930), Australian geographer
- Harry King (footballer) (Henry Edward King, 1886–1968), English football (soccer) player
- Henry C. King (1915–2005), British astronomer and writer

== Other uses ==
- "Henry King, Who chewed bits of string and was early cut off in dreadful agonies", poem by Hilaire Belloc
- Brainwave (character), a name shared by two DC Comics characters, father and son, supervillain Henry King Sr. and superhero Henry King Jr.

== See also ==
- King Henry (disambiguation)
