= Kenneth King =

Kenneth, Ken or Kenny King may refer to:

== Arts and entertainment ==
- Kenneth King (artist), Irish artist
- Kenneth King (dancer) (born 1948), American post-modern dancer and choreographer
- Kenneth George King or Jonathan King (born 1944), English singer-songwriter

== Sports ==
- Kenny King (defensive lineman) (born 1981), American football defensive tackle
- Kenny King (running back) (born 1957), American football running back
- Kenneth King (cricketer) (1915-1997), English cricketer
- Ken King (ice hockey) (1952–2020), Canadian sports executive
- Kenny King (wrestler) (born 1981), American professional wrestler

== Others ==
- Kenneth King (academic) (born 1940), British historian and Africanist
- Kenneth King (Kansas politician) (1930-2003), American politician from Kansas
- Ken King (politician) (born 1971), American politician and businessman from Texas

== See also ==
- King Kenneth (disambiguation)
