= Küng =

Küng (also written as Kueng) is a surname of German origin. Notable people with the surname include:

- Andres Küng (1945–2002), Swedish journalist, writer, entrepreneur and politician
- Carmen Küng (born 1978), Swiss curler
- Dinah Lee Küng, American-born Swiss journalist and novelist
- Hans Küng (1928–2021), Swiss Catholic theologian
- Patrick Küng (born 1984), Swiss World Cup alpine ski racer
- Stefan Küng (born 1993), Swiss cyclist

== See also ==
- J. Alexander Kueng, former police officer involved in the murder of George Floyd
- Kong (surname) (孔); Kung is a common transliteration of this Chinese name
