= Frederick King (cricketer) =

English cricketer

Personal information
- Born: 12 November 1850; Harbledown, Kent
- Died: 16 June 1893 (aged 42); Hammersmith, London

Domestic team information
- Years: Team
- 1871: Kent
- Only FC: 22 June 1871 Kent v Sussex
- Source: CricInfo, 7 June 2022

Frederick King (21 November 1850 – 16 June 1893) was an English cricketer who played one first-class cricket match for Kent County Cricket Club in 1871.

King was born at Harbledown, near Canterbury in Kent in 1850, the son of John and Elizabeth King (née Webb). His father was a butler at Hall Place in the village and had played cricket for the village team in the 1840s. King also played for the village, and for Canterbury Citizens, where he played alongside his brother George, and St Lawrence.

The only first-class match King played in was a June 1871 fixture for Kent against Sussex at the Royal Brunswick Ground in Hove. In a one-sided match which Sussex won easily, he opened the batting and scored a total of 11 runs, with a highest score of six made in the second innings and did not take a wicket when he bowled. He is known to have played one match for Gentlemen of Kent earlier in the same year.

King married Mary Clinch at Lenham in 1875. He studied agriculture and ran a farm at Coldred during the 1880s before moving to live at Hernhill. He died at the West London Hospital in Hammersmith in 1893 aged 42.

== Bibliography ==
- Carlaw, Derek (2020). Kent County Cricketers, A to Z: Part One (1806–1914) (PDF). Cardiff: ACS.
