= Marcia Gygli King =

American artist

- Born: June 4, 1931; Cleveland, Ohio
- Died: January 18, 2011 (aged 79); San Antonio, Texas

Marcia Gygli King (June 4, 1931 Cleveland, Ohio – January 18, 2011) was an American artist.

== Life ==
She attended Laurel School in Shaker Heights, Ohio. She graduated from Smith College with a BA in English. She studied at the Corcoran School of Art, and graduated from the University of Texas at San Antonio with an MFA.

She moved to New York City in 1979. as her art career prospered but she continued to return to her home in San Antonio throughout her life and lived at home in San Antonio in her final years. She spent her summers in Sagaponack, New York, where she painted, enjoyed the beach and the special light of Long Island with her family and friends.

Her work is in the Guggenheim Museum, Brooklyn Museum, Newark Museum, Cleveland Museum of Art, San Antonio Museum of Art, McNay Art Museum and National Museum of Women in the Arts.

== Exhibitions ==
- 2009, "40 year Retrospective", San Antonio Museum of Art; Southwest School of Arts and Crafts; University of Texas at San Antonio

== Works ==
- Scott A. Sherer (ed) Marcia Gygli King: Forty Years, San Antonio Museum of Art, 2008, ISBN 978-1-883502-17-1
- Marcia King, Hal Katzen Gallery, 1992
- Marcia Gygli King: relief paintings 1982–1984, Marion Koogler McNay Art Museum, 1984
