= Ralph E. King =

American politician

Ralph Elijah King, Sr., M.D.

Louisiana State Senator for Franklin, Richland, and Catahoula parishes
- In office 1944–1952
- Preceded by: W. D. Cotton
- Succeeded by: Billy Boles
- In office 1956–1960
- Preceded by: Billy Boles
- Succeeded by: J. C. Gilbert

Personal details
- Born: June 16, 1902
- Died: December 2, 1974 (aged 72)
- Party: Democratic
- Children: 1

Ralph Elijah King, Sr. (June 16, 1902 – December 2, 1974) was a physician from Winnsboro, Louisiana, who served three non-consecutive terms in the Louisiana State Senate for Catahoula, Franklin, and Richland parishes from 1944 to 1952 and again from 1956 to 1960.

Ralf Jr. remarried to Isabel Bernal, a Colombian born aristocrat with ties to the Eisenhower family, in the early 80's. He adopted her two sons Martin Echavarria, award-winning author of "Enabling Collaboration - Achieving Success Through Strategic Alliances and Partnerships" and Camilo Echavarria, attorney at Davis Wright Tremaine. They divorced after three years of marriage.

Political offices
Preceded by W. D. Cotton	Louisiana State Senator for Catahoula, Franklin, and Richland parishes Ralph Elijah King, Sr., M.D. 1944–1952	Succeeded by Billy Boles
Preceded by Billy Boles	Louisiana State Senator for Catahoula, Franklin, and Richland parishes Ralph Elijah King, Sr., M.D. 1956–1960	Succeeded by J. C. Gilbert
