= Margaret King (painter) =

British artist

Margaret King was a painter active in London between 1779 and 1787.

King exhibited pastel portraits at the Royal Academy from addresses in Soho, beginning in 1779 and continuing until 1787. She was generally adjudged in the press as being possessed of a good deal of talent, and her work received favorable notices from the critics most years; one wrote, in 1784, that "Miss Margaret King, who stands first in merit, and almost alone, as an artist in crayons, has given us but one portrait, not finished with her usual care...." An attempt has been made to connect her to a Margaret King, portraitist and drawing teacher, who was recorded in Bath, Somerset between 1799 and 1819. Besides the sixteen pieces listed in the Royal Academy catalogues of various years, two pastels, one of an unknown lady and one of Sarah Tatum, later Mrs. Nathaniel Still of Salisbury, are known to have survived.
