= Marie Sarr Mbodj =

Senegalese Minister of Public Health

- Born: September 28, 1935; Thiès, Senegal
- Citizenship: Senegalese
- Occupations: Politician, Inspector of technical education
- Known for: First female Minister of Public Health in Senegal

Marie Sarr Mbodj (born 28 September 1935 in Thiès, Senegal) is a Senegalese politician.

== Biography ==
She was the State Secretary to the Minister for National Education in charge of technical and vocational education from April 3, 1983 to January 2, 1986, then the Minister of Public Health from January 2, 1986 to April 5, 1988 under the presidency of Abdou Diouf. She was one of the first Senegalese women ministers, and the first female Minister of Public Health.

Mbodj attended the Filles de Thiès urban school between 1943 and 1949. She studied mathematics and psychology and took the exam of the École normale. She subsequently became an inspector of technical education. According to a 1999 record, Mbodj had never been in politics before she joined the government in 1983.
