= Saint James =

Saint James or St. James may refer to:

== People ==
=== Saints ===
- James, brother of Jesus (died 62 or 69), also known as James the Just
- James the Great (died 44), Apostle, also known as James, son of Zebedee, or Saint James the Greater
- James, son of Alphaeus (died c. 62), Apostle, also known as James the Less
- James the Less, possibly the same as the son of Alphaeus or the brother of Jesus
- James Intercisus (died 421), also known as St James the Mutilated
- James the Deacon (died after 671), Roman deacon and missionary to England
- Saint James Matamoros (9th cent.), or Saint James the Moor-slayer
- James of the Marches (died 1476), papal legate and inquisitor.
- Venerable James of Sclavonia, Croatian monk who was prone to ecstasies, worked miracles and levitated

=== People with the surname ===
- Rebecca St. James (born 1977), Australian Christian singer and actress
- Simone St. James (born 19??), Canadian author
- Susan Saint James (born 1946), American actress and activist
- Lyn St. James (born 1947), American racecar driver
- Claude Baudard de Saint-James (1738–1787), French businessman.
- Daniel Saint-James (born 1927), French physician
- Synthia Saint James (born 1949), American writer, lecturer and educator
- David St. James (born 1947), American actor
- Kevin St. James, American politician

=== People with the given name ===
- St. James Davis (1943–2018), American racing driver

== Places ==
=== Australia ===
- St James, New South Wales
- St James, Victoria
- St James, Western Australia

=== Canada ===
- St. James-Assiniboia, Winnipeg
- Saint James Parish, New Brunswick
- St. James (federal electoral district), Quebec, 1892–1952
- St. James (provincial electoral district), Manitoba
- St. James Town, Toronto, Ontario

=== United Kingdom ===
- St James's, a district in the City of Westminster, London
  - St James's Street
  - Westminster St James, or St James Piccadilly, a former civil parish
  - St James's (Westminster ward), an electoral ward in London
- St James (Kingston upon Thames ward), a former electoral ward of Kingston upon Thames London Borough Council that existed from 1965 to 2022
- St James (Waltham Forest ward), an electoral ward in London
- St James End, Northampton, also known as St. James
- St James' Park, football stadium in Newcastle Upon Tyne

=== United States ===
- St. James, Arkansas
- St. James City, Florida
- Saint James, Illinois
- Saint James, Indiana
- St. James, Louisiana
- St. James Parish, Louisiana
- St. James, Maryland
- St. James, Michigan
- St. James, Minnesota
- St. James, Missouri
- St. James, Nebraska
- St. James, New York
  - Saint James District
- St. James, North Carolina
- Saint James, Ohio
- St. James Township (disambiguation)

=== Other countries ===
- Saint James, Barbados
- Saint-James, Manche département, France
  - Saint James Airfield
- St James, Guernsey
- Saint James Parish, Jamaica
- St James Station, New Zealand
- St James, Cape Town, South Africa
- Saint James, Trinidad and Tobago
- St James (Bahamas Parliament constituency)

== Other uses ==
- St. James Davis chimpanzee attack, 2005 chimpanzee attack
- Court of St James's, the court of the British sovereign for diplomatic purposes
- St. James Court Art Show, or just St. James, held annually in Louisville, Kentucky, U.S.
- HMS St James, the name of two Royal Navy ships
- The St. James, luxury skyscraper in Washington Square West, Philadelphia
- The St. James (sports complex) in Springfield, Virginia
- St James' Swifts F.C., a football club from Northern Ireland, UK

== See also ==
- St. James's Hospital (disambiguation)
- St. James Academy (disambiguation)
- St. James' Church (disambiguation)
- St James College (disambiguation)
- St James's House (disambiguation)
- St. James Infirmary (disambiguation)
- St James Park (disambiguation)
- Saint James Parish (disambiguation)
- St. James School (disambiguation)
- Saint James station (disambiguation)
- St James Street (disambiguation)
- St James Theatre (disambiguation)
- James (disambiguation)
- St Jimmy, a character from the album and Broadway musical American Idiot
- Saint Jacques (disambiguation)
- San Diego (disambiguation)
- Santiago (disambiguation)
- St James the Great (disambiguation)
- Saint Jacob, means "St. James"
- Saint-Jammes, a commune in the Pyrénées-Atlantiques department in Nouvelle-Aquitaine
