= James King =

James, Jim or Jimmy King may refer to:

== Military ==
- James King, 1st Lord Eythin (1589–1652), Scottish general in Swedish service and later in the English Civil War
- James King (Royal Navy officer) (1750–1784), British Royal Navy captain who served under James Cook
- James Wilson King (1818–1905), Chief Engineer of the United States Navy
- James W. King (1842–1903), American Civil War soldier and newspaper editor
- James C. King (born 1946), United States Army lieutenant general and director of the National Geospatial-Intelligence Agency, 1998–2001

== Politics ==
- James G. King (1791–1853), American businessman and United States Representative from New Jersey
- James King King (1806–1881), British MP for Herefordshire
- James A. King (1832–1899), Scottish cabinet minister of the Republic of Hawaii
- James King (Quebec politician) (1848–1900), Canadian businessman and member of the Legislative Assembly of Quebec
- James Harold King (1871–1949), physician and politician in Ontario, Canada
- James Horace King (1873–1955), Canadian Minister of Pensions and National Health, 1928–1930
- James Chisholm King (1886–1970), politician in Saskatchewan, Canada
- Jim King (politician) (1939–2009), American politician, Florida state senator
- James King (Maryland politician) (born 1974), member of the Maryland House of Delegates

== Sports ==
=== Cricket ===
- James King (Australian cricketer) (1851–1921), Australian cricketer
- James King (cricketer, born 1855) (1855–?), English cricketer
- James King (cricketer, born 1869) (1869–1948), English cricketer
- James King (cricketer, born 1942), English cricketer

=== Association football ===
- James King (Scottish footballer) (1906–1985), Scottish international footballer
- James King (English footballer) (born 1996), English footballer

=== Basketball ===
- Jim King (basketball, born 1941) (born 1941), American basketball player, former basketball coach for the University of Tulsa
- Jim King (basketball, born 1943), American basketball player in the 1968 Olympics
- Jimmy King (born 1973), American basketball player, member of the University of Michigan Fab Five

=== Rugby ===
- James King (rugby league), rugby league footballer for Ireland, Barrow Raiders, and Leigh Centurions
- James King (rugby union, born 1986), Scottish rugby union player
- James King (rugby union, born 1987), New Zealand rugby union player
- James King (rugby union, born 1990), Welsh rugby union player

=== Other sports ===
- Jim King (footballer) (1873–1929), Australian rules footballer
- Jim King (baseball) (1932–2015), American baseball player
- Jim King (American football), American football coach
- James King (hurdler) (born 1949), American hurdler

== Entertainment ==
- Jack King (animator) (1895–1958), American animator, especially with Walt Disney, whose real name was James King
- James King (tenor) (1925–2005), American opera singer
- Jim King (saxophonist) (1942–2012), English rock musician, member of the band Family
- James King (bluegrass) (1958–2016), American bluegrass music singer
- James King (film critic), British broadcast film critic
- James King (musician), American soul musician, member of the band Fitz and The Tantrums
- Jaime King (born 1979), American actress and model, sometimes billed as James King

== Others ==
- James King, 4th Baron Kingston (1693–1761), British peer
- James King (priest) (1715–1795), Canon of Windsor and Dean of Raphoe
- James King, 5th Earl of Kingston (1800–1869), Irish peer and barrister
- James King (pioneer) (1800–1857), Scottish-born Australian businessman and winemaker
- James King of William (1822–1856), American newspaper editor
- Sir James King, 1st Baronet (1830–1911), Scottish businessman, and Lord Provost of Glasgow, 1886–89
- James King (architect) (fl. 1860s–1892), American architect
- James M. King (1839–1907), American Methodist minister, writer, and political activist
- James Albert King (1864–1933), paternal grandfather of civil rights leader Dr. Martin Luther King, Jr.
- James E. King Jr. (1874–1947), American physician, biological son of Grover Cleveland
- James L. King (engineer) (1922–c. 1995), British engineer
- James Lawrence King (born 1927), United States federal judge
- James Roger King (1927–1991), American ornithologist

== Fictional ==
- Jimmy King (Emmerdale), a fictional character in the British TV soap Emmerdale
- James King, a fictional character in the American TV series Last Resort

== See also ==
- King James (disambiguation)
- Jamie King (disambiguation)
- Jimmy King (disambiguation)
- James Kingston (disambiguation)
