= James Street railway station =

James Street railway station may refer to:

- Liverpool James Street railway station, a station in Liverpool, England, on the Wirral Line
- James Street railway station (Liverpool Overhead Railway), a former station in Liverpool, England
- James Street railway station, Hyderabad in India
- LIUNA Station in Hamilton, Ontario, Canada, formerly known as James Street railway station

== See also ==
- Saint James station (disambiguation)
- James Street (disambiguation)
