= James of England =

James of England may refer to:

- James I of England (1566–1625), King of England from 1603
- James II of England (1633–1701), King of England from 1685 to 1688

== See also ==
- James Francis Edward Stuart (1688–1766), Jacobite pretender to the British throne
- King James (disambiguation)
- Prince James (disambiguation)
