= SJHS =

SJHS may refer to several high schools:

== Canada ==
- Saint John High School, Saint John, New Brunswick, Canada
- St. Joseph High School (Ottawa) Ottawa, Ontario, Canada

== Philippines ==
- St. James High School (Philippines), Buenavista, Agusan del Norte

== United States ==
- Saint Jerome High School, Holyoke, Massachusetts: Closed 1963
- San José High School, San Jose, California
- Seminole Junior High School, Seminole, Texas
- Smith Junior High School, Mesa, Arizona
- Stonewall Jackson High School, renamed Unity Reed High School in 2020, Bull Run, Virginia
- Stonewall Jackson High School, renamed Mountain View High School from 2020 until 2024, Quicksburg, Virginia
- Stonewall Jackson High School (Kanawha County, West Virginia): Closed 1989

== See also ==
- Saint Joseph High School (disambiguation)
