= St James Square =

St. James Square may refer to:

- St. James Square Historic District, San Jose, California
- St. James Square, the historic campus of the Toronto Normal School, Ontario, Canada
- Sankt Jakobs Plads (St. James' Square), Copenhagen, Denmark
- St James's Square, London, England
- The original name of Telfair Square in Savannah, Georgia
- St James Square, Monmouth, Wales

== See also ==
- St James Park (disambiguation)
- St James Quarter, Edinburgh, Scotland
