= St. James School =

St. James School or variants may refer to:

== United Kingdom ==
- St James School, Exeter, Devon, England
- St James School, Grimsby, Lincolnshire, England
- St James's School, Dudley, West Midlands, England
- St James' Catholic High School, Colindale, London, England
- St James' Catholic High School, Stockport, Greater Manchester, England
- St James's Church of England High School, Farnworth, Greater Manchester, England
- St James Independent Schools, England

== United States ==
- St. James School, Maryland
- St. James School, Ohio
- Saint James School (Montgomery, Alabama)
- St. James High School (Louisiana)
- St. James High School (Ferndale, Michigan)
- Saint James High School (New Jersey), Carneys Point Township, New Jersey
- St. James High School for Boys, Pennsylvania
- St. James High School (South Carolina)
- St. James Middle School, South Carolina
- St. James Parish Public Schools, Louisiana

== Other countries ==
- Saint James Catholic High School (Guelph), Ontario, Canada
- St. James Collegiate, Manitoba, Canada
- St. James' School (Kolkata), West Bengal, India
- St. James High School (Philippines)

== See also ==
- St. James Elementary School (disambiguation)
- St. James Academy (disambiguation)
- Saint James School of Medicine, Anguilla and Saint Vincent and the Grenadines
