= Church of St. James the Greater =

Church of St. James the Greater may refer to:

- Church of St. James the Greater (Bristol, Pennsylvania), United States
- Church of St. James the Greater (Jihlava), Czech Republic
- Church of St. James the Greater (Prague), Czech Republic
- Church of St. James the Greater, Sokolniki, Poland
- Saint James' the Elder church (Štvrtok na Ostrove), Slovakia

== See also ==
- St James the Great (disambiguation)
