= James River (disambiguation) =

The James River is a river in the U.S. state of Virginia.

James River may also refer to:

Rivers:

- James River (Alberta), in Canada
- James River (Dakotas), in North & South Dakota, United States
- James River (Missouri), in the United States
- James River (Texas), in the United States

Places:

- James River, Nova Scotia, a rural community in Nova Scotia, Canada

Other:

- James River, the working title of American recording artist D'Angelo's third studio album, later retitled Black Messiah
- James River (train), a former Amtrak passenger train along Virginia's James River
- "James River", a song by Merle Kilgore
- James River Corporation, a former paper company

== See also ==
- James River Correctional Center, in Goochland County, Virginia
- James River Elementary School (Williamsburg, Virginia)
- James River High School (disambiguation), three such schools in Virginia
- USS James River, more than one United States Navy ship
- James River Bridge
- James (disambiguation)
- James Lake (disambiguation)
