= King James =

King James may refer to:

== Monarchs ==
=== Scottish ===
- James I of Scotland (1394–1437), nominal King of Scots from 1406 and reigned 1424–1437
- James II of Scotland (1430–1460), King of Scots 1437–1460, son of James I
- James III of Scotland (1451–1488), King of Scots 1460–1488, son of James II
- James IV (1473–1513), King of Scots 1488–1513, son of James III
- James V (1512–1542), nominal King of Scots from 1513 and reigned 1528–1542, son of James IV

=== Scottish and English ===
- James VI and I (1566–1625), sponsor of the eponymous Bible translation, reigned as King James VI of Scotland 1567–1625 and King James I of England and Ireland 1603–1625, grandson of James V
- James II of England (and Ireland) and VII of Scotland (1633–1701), grandson of James VI and I
- James Francis Edward Stuart (1688–1766), Jacobite pretender, son of James VII and II

=== Spanish ===
- James I of Aragon (1208–1276), surnamed the Conqueror, was the King of Aragon, Count of Barcelona and Lord of Montpellier 1213–1276, King of Majorca 1231–1276, and King of Valencia 1238–1276.
- James II of Aragon (1267–1327), called The Just (Catalan: El Just), reigned as King James II of Aragon and Velancia and Count of Barcelona 1291–1327, King James I of Sicily 1285–1295, grandson of James I of Aragon.
- James II of Majorca (1243–1311), King of Majorca 1276–1286 and 1295–1311, younger son of James I of Aragon.
- James III of Majorca (1315–1349), King of Majorca 1324–1344, last ruler of independent Majorca, grandson of James II of Majorca.
- James IV of Majorca (1336–1375), unsuccessfully claimed the throne of Majorca, son of James III of Majorca.

== People nicknamed or under the pseudonym "King James" ==
- James Strang (1813–1856), founder of the Strangite Church of Jesus Christ of Latter Day Saints, who was crowned king of Beaver Island in Lake Michigan
- LeBron James (born 1984), American basketball player

== Music ==
- King James (band), a Christian metal/rock supergroup formed in 1993
- King James Records, a 1980s American gospel music label founded by James Cleveland
- "King James" (M.I song), 2014
- "King James", a song by Anderson Paak from Ventura, 2019
- "King James", a song by Buckethead from Crime Slunk Scene, 2006
- "King James", a song by John Zorn from Filmworks II: Music for an Untitled Film by Walter Hill, 1995

== Christianity ==
- The Authorized King James Version of the Bible
  - See King James Version (disambiguation) for other variants

== Other ==
- SS King James, a number of ships with this name
- King James (horse), an American Thoroughbred racehorse
- King James (play), a 2022 play by Rajiv Joseph

== See also ==
- King James Academy (disambiguation)
- King James's School (disambiguation)
- James King (disambiguation)
- James (disambiguation)
- KJ (disambiguation)
