= James Township =

James Township may refer to several places:

== Canada ==
- James, Ontario, a township in Timiskaming District

== United States ==
- James Township, Scott County, Arkansas
- James Township, Pottawattamie County, Iowa
- James Township, Michigan

== See also ==
- St. James Township (disambiguation)
- James (disambiguation)
