= St. Jacques =

St. Jacques may refer to:

- St. Jacques, Newfoundland and Labrador, a town in Canada
- Bruno St. Jacques (born 1980), Canadian professional ice hockey player
- Raymond St. Jacques (1930–1990), American actor

== See also ==
- Saint-Jacques (disambiguation)
- St. James (disambiguation)
- St-Jacques, surname
