= Simcoe Park =

Park in Toronto, Ontario, Canada

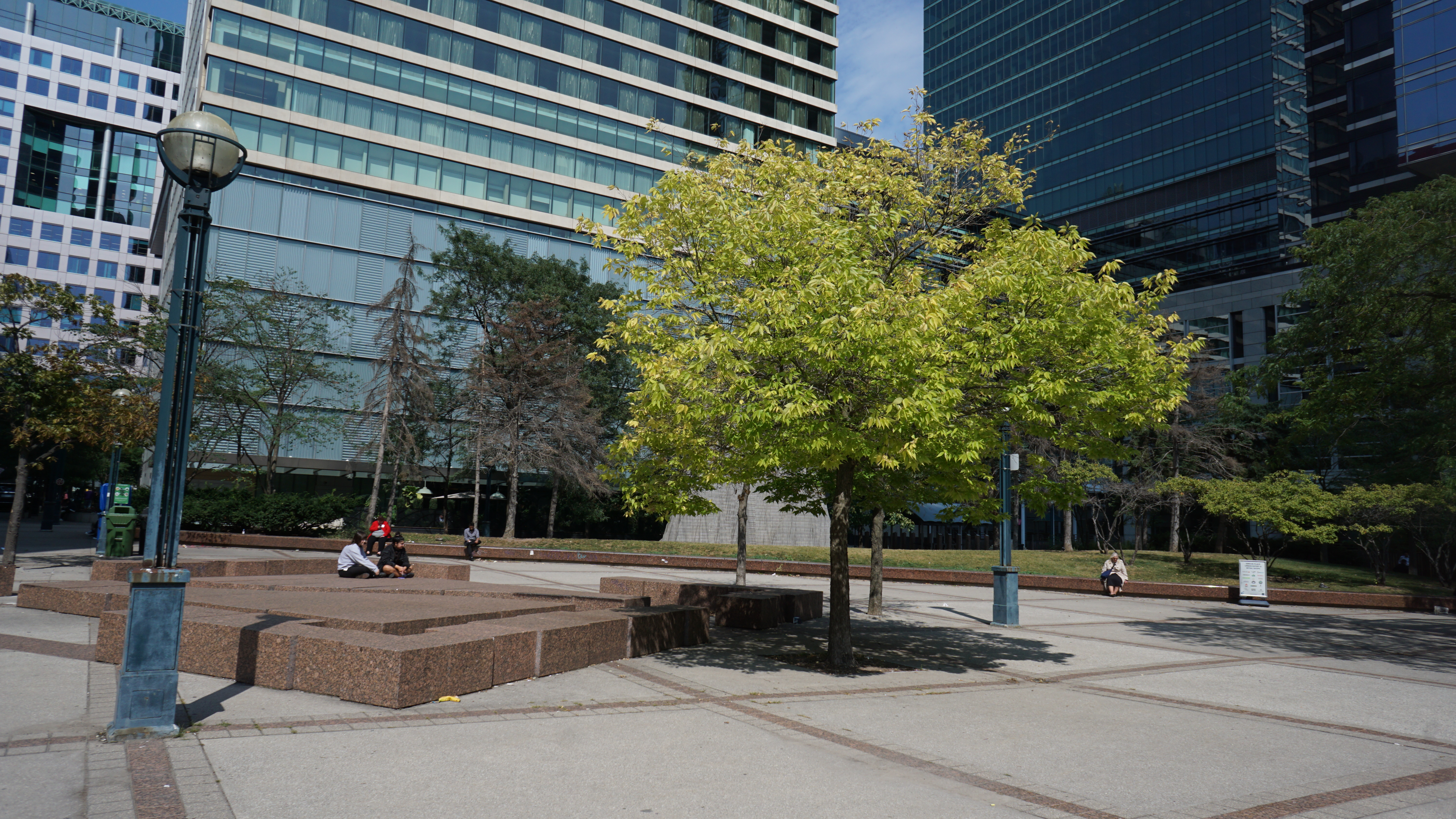
- The park in 2024
- Interactive map of Simcoe Park
- Location: Toronto, Ontario, Canada
- Coordinates: 43°38′41″N 79°23′13″W

Simcoe Park is a park in Toronto, Ontario, Canada. The Worker's Monument (or 100 Workers Monument) is installed in the park. Simcoe Park was used by Occupy Toronto demonstrators.
