= Saint-Jacques =

Saint-Jacques (the French name for Saint James) may refer to:

== Canada ==
- Saint-Jacques, New Brunswick, a former village, now part of Edmundston
- Saint-Jacques Parish, New Brunswick

=== Quebec ===
- Saint-Jacques Cathedral (Montreal), built in 1822 and demolished in 1973
- Saint-Jacques (federal electoral district), a former federal electoral district in Quebec
- Saint-Jacques (provincial electoral district), Montreal, Quebec
- Saint-Jacques, Quebec, a municipality in the province of Quebec
- Saint-Jacques-de-Leeds, Quebec, a municipality in the province of Quebec
- Saint-Jacques-le-Majeur-de-Wolfestown, a parish in the province of Quebec
- Saint-Jacques-le-Mineur, Quebec, a parish in the province of Quebec
- Saint-Jacques River (Portneuf River tributary), Quebec
- Saint Jacques River (Roussillon), Quebec

== France ==
- Saint-Jacques, Alpes-de-Haute-Provence, in the Alpes-de-Haute-Provence department
- Saint-Jacques-d'Aliermont, in the Seine-Maritime department
- Saint-Jacques-d'Ambur, in the Puy-de-Dôme department
- Saint-Jacques-d'Atticieux, in the Ardèche department
- Saint-Jacques-de-la-Lande, in the Ille-et-Vilaine department
- Saint-Jacques-de-Néhou, in the Manche department
- Saint-Jacques-des-Arrêts, in the Rhône department
- Saint-Jacques-des-Blats, in the Cantal department
- Saint-Jacques-des-Guérets, in the Loir-et-Cher department
- Saint-Jacques-de-Thouars, in the Deux-Sèvres department
- Saint-Jacques-en-Valgodemard, in the Hautes-Alpes department
- Saint-Jacques-sur-Darnétal, in the Seine-Maritime department
- Ville-Saint-Jacques, in the Seine-et-Marne department

== United States ==
- Saint Jacques, Michigan, an unincorporated community

== Other ==
- Saint Jacques (grape), a name for the French/German wine grape Pinot Noir Précoce
- Saint-Jacques station, a Paris Metro station
- Saint Jacques (school), an alternative name for the Institut National de Jeunes Sourds de Paris
- Saint-Jacques-de-Compostelle, the French name for Santiago de Compostela, in Galicia, Spain

== See also ==
- St-Jacques, a surname
- St. Jacques (disambiguation)
- Saint James (disambiguation)
