= James Street =

James Street may refer to:

== People ==
- James Street (cricketer) (1839–1906), English cricketer and umpire
- James Street (novelist) (1903–1954), US journalist, Baptist minister, and novelist
- James Street (American football) (1948–2013), American football quarterback
- James Street (actor) (1993–2007), British-American voice actor.

== Places ==
- James Street (Hamilton, Ontario), arterial road in Hamilton, Ontario, Canada
- James Street Bridge (Kansas City, Kansas), road crossing over the Kansas River
- James Street Railway Station (India), railway station in Hyderabad, Andhra Pradesh, India
- Liverpool James Street railway station, railway station in Liverpool, England
- James Street, Marylebone, street in London, England
- James Street, Northbridge, in Perth, Western Australia

== Others ==
- James Street F.C., based in Blackburn, England, which merged to form Blackburn Olympic F.C.
- Jim Street, a character from the TV series S.W.A.T.
- James Street (album), an album by Jimmy Ponder
