= King James's School =

King James's School may refer to:

- King James's School, Almondbury, a secondary school in Almondbury, West Yorkshire, England
- King James's School, Knaresborough, a secondary school in Knaresborough, North Yorkshire, England

== See also ==
- King James (disambiguation)
