= James =

James may refer to:

== People and fictional characters ==
- James (given name)
  - List of people with given name James, including fictional characters
- James (surname)
- King James (disambiguation)
- Prince James (disambiguation)
- Saint James (disambiguation)
- James (musician), stage name of Bangladeshi and Bollywood musician Faruq Mahfuz Anam James (born 1964)

== Places ==
- James, Ontario, Canada
- James Bay, a large body of water
- James, Georgia, US, an unincorporated community
- James, Iowa, US, an unincorporated community
- James Lake (disambiguation)
- James River (disambiguation)

== Film and television ==
- James (2005 film), a Bollywood film
- James (2008 film), an Irish short film
- James (2022 film), an Indian Kannada-language film
- "James", a television episode of Adventure Time

== Music ==
- James (band), from Manchester
  - James, US title of the 1991 re-release of their album Gold Mother
- James (EP), 2017, by Phoebe Ryan
- "James" (song), a 1976 single by Billy Joel
- "James", a song from the 1980 album Come Upstairs by Carly Simon
- "James", a song from the 1981 album Offramp by Pat Metheny and Lyle Mays
- "James", a 2000 single from the album Consent to Treatment by Blue October
- "James", a song from the 2018 album Little Dark Age by MGMT
- "James", a song by the 2020 album Notes from the Archive: Recordings 2011-2016 by Maggie Rogers

== Other uses ==
- Epistle of James, part of the New Testament
- James, brother of Jesus
- A muscadine (Vitis rotundifolia) cultivar
- James College, York, a college of the University of York
- James (novel), 2024, by Percival Everett
- James Cycle Co, a British cycle and motorcycle manufacturer
- James (ship), ships with the same name
- James Channel, a retro gaming Youtube channel
- Apache James, (Java Apache Mail Enterprise Server)
- Journal of Advances in Modeling Earth Systems (JAMES), a scientific journal on Earth system modeling

== See also ==
- James's theorem, theorem in mathematics
- Jamestown (disambiguation)
- James City (disambiguation)
