= St James's House =

St James's House may refer to:

- St James's House, Birmingham, England
- St James House, Bristol, England
- St James House, Monmouth, Wales
- St. James House of Prayer Episcopal Church, Tampa, Florida, United States

== See also ==
- Saint James (disambiguation)
