= Jimmy King (disambiguation) =

Jimmy King (born 1973) is an American basketball player.

Jimmy King may also refer to:

- Jimmy King (Emmerdale), fictional character
- Jimmy King (Revolution), alias of fictional character, President Sebastian Monroe

== See also ==
- James King (disambiguation)
