= St James the Great (disambiguation) =

St James the Great is James, son of Zebedee, one of the twelve apostles of Jesus.

St James the Great may also refer to:

== Churches ==
=== United Kingdom ===
- Church of St James the Great, Hanslope, a church in Buckinghamshire, England
- Church of St James the Great, Birstall, a church in Leicestershire, England
- St James the Great, Cardiff, a defunct church in Wales
- St James the Great, Colchester, a church in Essex, England
- Church of St James the Great, Darlington, a church in County Durham, England
- St James the Great Church, Dauntsey, a church in Wiltshire, England
- St James the Great, a church in Elmsted, Kent, England
- Church of St James the Great, Ewhurst Green, a church in East Sussex, England
- Church of St James the Great, Fitzhead, a church in Somerset, England
- St James the Great, Friern Barnet, a church in north London, England
- Church of St James the Great, Fulbrook, a church in Oxfordshire, England
- Church of St James the Great, Haydock, a church in the diocese of Liverpool, England
- St James the Great, Morpeth, a church in Morpeth, Northumberland, England
- St James the Great Church, Norton Canes, a church in Staffordshire, England
- St James the Great, a church in Salt, Staffordshire, England
- Church of St James the Great, Sedgley, a church in the West Midlands, England
- St James the Great, Shirley, a church in Birmingham, England
- St James the Great Church, Wrightington, a church in Lancashire, England

=== Other countries ===
- Church of St James the Great, Worcester a church in South Africa
- Saint James the Great Parish Church (Bolinao), a church in the Philippines
- St James the Great Church, a church in Flushing, Netherlands
- St James the Great, St Kilda East, a church in Glen Eira, Victoria, Australia

== Other uses ==
- Saint James the Great (El Greco), a 1610 painting by El Greco
- James (given name), is given name

== See also ==
- Saint James (disambiguation)
- Church of St. James the Greater (disambiguation)
