= St James Park =

St James Park and variants may refer to:

== Sports venues ==
- St James' Park, Newcastle upon Tyne, England, ground of Newcastle United F.C.
- St James Park (Exeter), England, ground of Exeter City F.C.
- St James Park, Hawthorn, Australia, sporting venue and public park
- St James Park, ground of Brackley Town F.C., Brackley, England
- St. James' Park, ground of St. James' GAA, County Cork, Ireland

== Parks ==
- St James's Park, London, England
- St James' Park, Bristol, England
- St. James Park (Bronx), New York
- St. James Park (San Jose, California)
- St James' Park, Southampton, England
- St. James Park (Toronto), Canada

== Railway stations ==
- St James Park railway station, a station in Exeter, England
- St James's Park tube station, a station in London, England
- St James Metro station, a station in Newcastle upon Tyne, England

== Other uses ==
- St James Park, a suburb of Hamilton, New Zealand
- St. James Park, Los Angeles, a historic district in California

== See also ==
- St James Square (disambiguation)
- St James (disambiguation)
