= St-Jacques =

St-Jacques is a surname, and may refer to:

- Diane St-Jacques (born 1953), Canadian politician
- Guillaume Cheval dit St-Jacques (1828-1880), Quebec businessman and political figure
- Véronique St-Jacques (born 1984), Canadian taekwondoin

== See also ==
- Saint-Jacques (disambiguation)
- St. Jacques (disambiguation)
