= St. James Township =

St. James Township or Saint James Township may refer to several places in the United States:

- St. James Township, Charlevoix County, Michigan
- St. James Township, Watonwan County, Minnesota
- St. James Township, in Mississippi County, Missouri
- St. James Township, in Phelps County, Missouri

== See also ==
- James Township (disambiguation)
- St. James (disambiguation)
