= Jamie King (disambiguation) =

Jamie King (born 1972) is an American choreographer and director.

Jamie King may also refer to:

- Jamie King (producer), filmmaker, writer, and activist
- Jaime King (born 1979), American actress and model, sometimes billed as James King
- Jamie Thomas King (born 1981), British actor
- Jamie King, Northern Irish bassist in the band Fighting with Wire
- Ja'mie King, fictional character in the Australian TV comedy series We Can Be Heroes and Summer Heights High
- Jamie King, fictional character in the American sitcom The Jamie Foxx Show played by Jamie Foxx
- Jamie King (curler) (born 1973), Canadian curler

== See also ==
- James King (disambiguation)
