= James Kingston (disambiguation) =

James Kingston (born 1965) is a South African golfer.

James or Jim Kingston may also refer to:

- Jim Kingston (cricketer) (1857–1929), English cricketer
- Jim Kingston (born 1990), American politician

== See also ==
- James King (disambiguation)
