= James River High School =

James River High School may refer to:

- James River High School (Buchanan, Virginia) in Botetourt County, Virginia
- James River High School (Chesterfield County, Virginia) in Chesterfield County, Virginia
- James River Christian Academy in Smithfield, Virginia

== See also ==
- James River, for which all three schools are named
- James River (disambiguation)
- James River Bridge
