= Rue Saint-Jacques =

The rue Saint-Jacques (in French, literally "Saint James Street"), is a street in a number of cities, including:

- Rue Saint-Jacques (Montreal), Canada
- Rue Saint-Jacques, Paris, France

== See also ==
- St James Street (disambiguation)
