= James Lake (disambiguation) =

James A. Lake (born 1941) is an American evolutionary biologist.

Other people named James Lake include:

- James Andrew Trehane Lake (1840–1876), lawyer, businessman and parliamentarian in South Australia
- James Lake of the Lake baronets
- Jimmy Lake (born 1976), American football coach

James Lake may also refer to:

- James Lake (Arkansas), a reservoir in Fulton County, Arkansas
- James Lake (Ontario), a lake in Northeastern Ontario, Canada on the border of Timiskaming and Nipissing Districts
- James Lake (Olrig Township, Nipissing District), Ontario
- James Lake (Bretz Lake, Kenora District), Ontario
- James Lake (Frontenac County), Ontario
- James Lake (Hastings County), Ontario
- James Lake (Shoal Lake, Kenora District), Ontario
- James Lake (Umbach Township, Kenora District), Ontario
- Northland Pyrite Mine (also known as James Lake Mine), a mine at the James Lake in Ontario
- Lake James (Indiana), a lake in northeastern Indiana, United States
- Lake James, a reservoir in North Carolina, United States

== See also ==
- Lake (surname)
- James (disambiguation)
- James River (disambiguation)
