= Štvrtok na Ostrove =

Štvrtok na Ostrove Csallóközcsütörtök
- Municipality
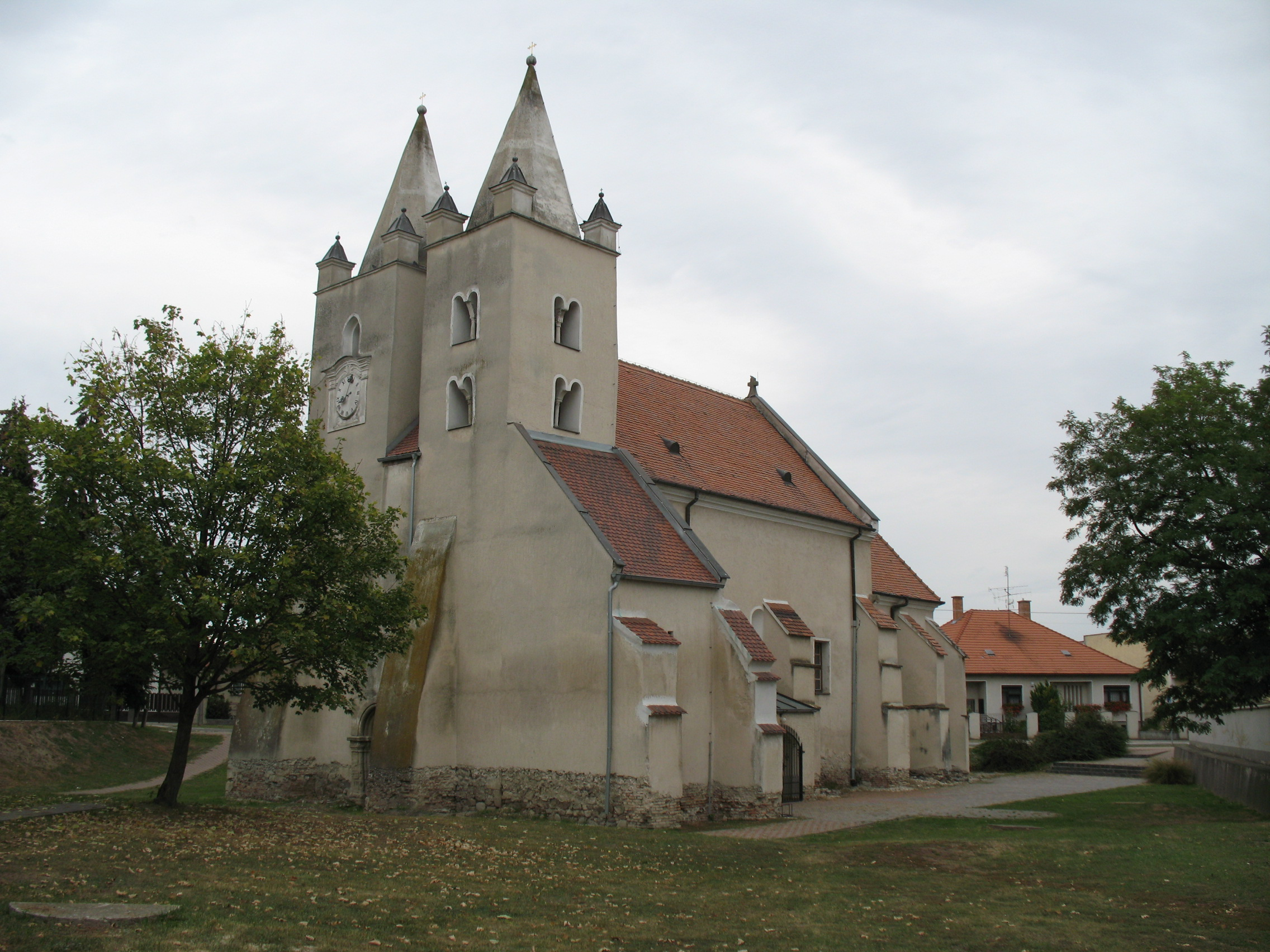

- Flag

- Location of Štvrtok na Ostrove in the Trnava Region Location of Štvrtok na Ostrove in Slovakia
- Coordinates: 48.10°N 17.35°E
- Country: Slovakia
- Region: Trnava Region
- District: Dunajská Streda District
- First mentioned: 1240

Government
  - Mayor: Péter Őry (Party of the Hungarian Coalition)

Area
  - Total: 13.06 km^{2} (5.04 sq mi)
- Elevation: 128 m (420 ft)

Population (2025)
  - Total: 1,757

Ethnicity
  - Hungarians: 82.85 %
  - Slovaks: 12.33 %
- Time zone: UTC+1 (CET)
  - Summer (DST): UTC+2 (CEST)
- Postal code: 930 40
- Area code: +421 31
- Vehicle registration plate (until 2022): DS
- Website: www.stvrtoknaostrove.sk

Štvrtok na Ostrove (Hungarian: Csallóközcsütörtök, pronounced [ˈtʃɒlːoːkøztʃytørtøk], formerly Csütörtök) is a village and municipality in the Dunajská Streda District in the Trnava Region of south-west Slovakia.

== Geography ==
The village is in the Danubian Lowland and is in the western part of Žitný ostrov (Csallóköz). The municipality lies at an altitude of 128 metres (420 ft) and covers an area of 13.06 km^{2} (5.04 sq mi) (2025).

== History ==
In the 11th century, the territory of Štvrtok na Ostrove became part of the Kingdom of Hungary. The earliest extant document about the village dates back to 1217, in which it was referred to it by its Hungarian name as Villa Ceturthuc.

In the thirteenth century German settlers arrived in the village who named it Loipersdorfin. The village enjoyed Royal privilege to collect tolls and in the fifteenth century it gained the status of a town and had the right to hold markets and develop crafts and trades. Today Štvrtok na Ostrove is a basically agricultural village.

Until the end of World War I, it was part of Hungary and fell within the Somorja district of Pozsony County. After the Austro-Hungarian army disintegrated in November 1918, Czechoslovak troops occupied the area. After the Treaty of Trianon of 1920, the village became officially part of Czechoslovakia. In November 1938, the First Vienna Award granted the area to Hungary and it was held by Hungary until 1945. After Soviet occupation in 1945, Czechoslovak administration returned and the village became officially part of Czechoslovakia in 1947.

== Population ==
Population statistic (10 years)
Year	1995	2005	2015	2025
Count	1619	1755	1750	1757
Difference		+8.40%	−0.28%	+0.40%

Population statistic
Year	2024	2025
Count	1740	1757
Difference		+0.97%

It has a population of 1757 people (31 December 2025).

=== Ethnicity ===
Census 2021 (1+ %)
Ethnicity	Number	Fraction
Hungarian	1197	69.83%
Slovak	556	32.43%
Romani	62	3.61%
Not found out	40	2.33%
Total	1714	

In year 2021 was 1714 people by ethnicity 1197 as Hungarian, 556 as Slovak, 62 as Romani, 40 as Not found out, 9 as Czech, 6 as Ukrainian, 6 as Other, 5 as Rusyn, 5 as Russian, 3 as Polish, 2 as German, 1 as Austrian, 1 as Croatian and 1 as Bulgarian.

Note on population: The difference values of population numbers in the table "Population statistic" and in the sections "Ethnicity" & "Religion" is caused by the use of various statistical methods.

=== Religion ===
Census 2021 (1+ %)
Religion	Number	Fraction
Roman Catholic Church	1332	77.71%
None	278	16.22%
Not found out	35	2.04%
Christian Congregations in Slovakia	25	1.46%
Total	1714	

In year 2021 was 1714 people by religion 1332 from Roman Catholic Church, 278 from None, 35 from Not found out, 25 from Christian Congregations in Slovakia, 12 from Calvinist Church, 11 from Greek Catholic Church, 10 from Evangelical Church, 2 from Paganism and natural spirituality, 2 from Apostolic Church, 1 from Jewish community, 1 from Eastern Orthodox Church, 1 from Other, 1 from United Methodist Church, 1 from Buddhism, 1 from Baptists Church and 1 from Ad hoc movements.

In 1910, the village had a population of 1228, mostly Hungarians.

At the 2001 Census the recorded population of the village was 1679 while an end-2008 estimate by the Statistical Office had the village's population as 1751. As of 2001, 82.85% of its population was Hungarian while 12.33% was Slovak.

As of 2001, 93.81% of the inhabitants professed Roman Catholicism.

== Landmarks ==
- The village is dominated by the late Romanesque church of St James the Elder which is mentioned in documents from 1333. The church was altered over the years and the most extensive modifications took place following damage caused by the 1590 Neulengbach earthquake.
- The cultural monuments in the village include the Holy Trinity column, the St. Florian statue of 1893, several roadside crosses and monuments to the victims of the First and Second World Wars.
