= King James Academy =

King James Academy may refer to:

- King James Academy Royston, a secondary school in Royston, Hertfordshire, England
- King James I Academy, a secondary school in Bishop Auckland, County Durham, England

== See also ==
- King James (disambiguation)
