= King James Version (disambiguation) =

The King James Version is an English translation of the Bible, first published in 1611.

King James Version may also refer to:

- Revised Version, a late 19th-century revision of the King James Version published in 1881-1894
- American Standard Version, a revision of the Revised Version translation of the Bible, published in 1901
- New King James Version, a modern, 20th-century Bible translation published in 1982
- 21st Century King James Version, a further revision, published in 1994
- King James Only movement, believe that the KJV is the greatest English translation ever produced, needing no further improvements, and that all other English translations produced after the KJV are corrupt

== Music ==
- King James Version (album), an album by Harvey Danger
- "King James Version", a song by Billy Bragg featured on his 1996 album William Bloke

== See also ==
- James I of England
