= Saint Jerome High School =

- Holyoke, Massachusetts; United States

Information
- Established: 24 February 1884
- Founder: Sr. Aloyse
- Closed: 1963
- Affiliation: Roman Catholic

Saint Jerome High School was a high school in Holyoke, Massachusetts

== The early years ==
The Sisters of Notre Dame came to Holyoke, Massachusetts in 1869 to take charge of the education of girls. For many years, this was the only religious order in the parish of St. Jerome, Holyoke. Father Harkins had a convent ready upon their arrival and the first classes were held in the old wooden school building which had been bought from the town and moved to the church grounds. This was the first parish school in the city and the second of the Springfield [MA] diocese.

The original number of sisters increased with the enrollment in the schools so that in 1912, the year of their departure, there were about twenty-five sisters in the convent. In addition to a sound training in Catholic subjects, the courses of study were similar in many respects to those of the public schools and capably fitted their graduates for entrance into State Normal Schools.

For forty-three years the self -sacrificing sisters of this devout order, some of whom were [in Holyoke, MA] for almost that entire period, applied themselves to the educational and moral training of the girls and young women. That these sisters molded noble women of their graduates is fully proven by the results of their work while at St. Jerome's.

== A New School Building ==
In 1879 Sr. Aloyse proposed the building of a new school [as may be seen today in the grand brick structure of ten bright, airy rooms]. On one corner is St. Jerome's Church; opposite is the respectable parochial residence; to the right the convent and school. It was edifying to see travelers and tradesmen raise their hats when passing the church, and who can tell of the many treasures of grace that have flowed from the Sacred Heart of Jesus on to those uncovered heads. On February 24, 1884 the sisters took possession of the fine new schoolhouse on Chestnut St.

== The Sisters of Providence ==
The Sisters of Providence by invitation of Fr. Harkins established its first house at St. Jerome's parish in 1874. The Sisters of Providence took charge of the Boy's [St. Jerome Institute for Boys]school in 1874. Since then they have expanded greatly in numbers, and have spread the blessings of their works of mercy to every corner of the [Springfield, MA] diocese. No story of St. Jerome's would be complete without an expression of appreciation of the services rendered to the parish, to Holyoke, and to the diocese by Mother Mary of Providence. This remarkable woman came to Holyoke when hardly out of her teens, and devoted her life for over a half century to works of education and mercy in and close to Holyoke.

== The Sisters of St. Joseph ==
When the teaching communities who had been in charge of the parish schools of St. Jerome decided in 1912 to relinquish their care, the duties were assumed by the Sisters of St. Joseph. The large number of schools in the diocese which are in their care testifies only in part to their efficiency as teachers. The college of Our Lady of the Elms, founded by His Excellency, Rt. Rev. Thomas Mary O'Leary, D.D., and established to complete the educational system of the diocese, is under the direction of this highly qualified community. The Sisters of St. Joseph have pledged their loyal support, kindly interest, their generous service in all that pertains to giving the "little ones" the benefits of their religious and secular training in the elementary and secondary branches of education. The following of Christ and the cultivation of Christian virtues are the underlying principles of their teaching.

In 1963 the Diocese of Springfield merged St. Jerome's, Sacred Heart, Holy Rosary, and Precious Blood Schools and named the new school Holyoke Catholic High School.

In 2002 the Diocese of Springfield closed St. Jerome's Institute [part of the campus of Holyoke Catholic High School].
