= Saint James' the Elder church (Štvrtok na Ostrove) =

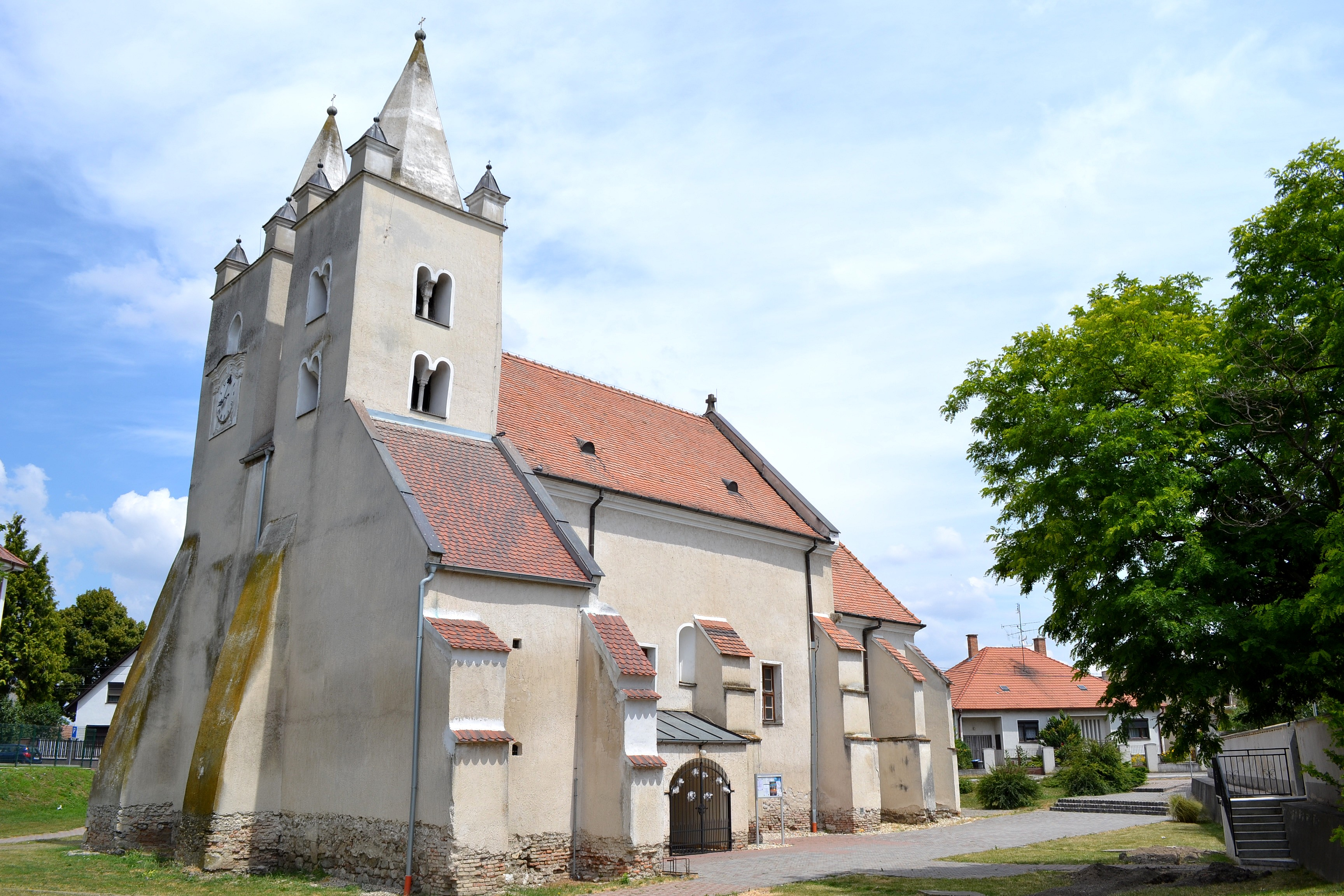
- Interactive map of the Saint James' the Elder church area

General information
- Type: Church
- Architectural style: Romanesque
- Location: Štvrtok na Ostrove, Slovakia
- Coordinates: 48°5′52″N 17°21′21″E
- Construction started: mid-13th century

Saint James' the Elder church is a Romanesque church in Štvrtok na Ostrove, Slovakia. The church was first mentioned in 1333. The consecration to Saint James the Elder is the oldest to this Apostle in Slovakia.

The prevailing building material used for the original construction in the mid-13th century building boom were bricks. The majority of the romanesque churches in this region of Slovakia is from this period. The two-tower design though makes this church unique on the Žitný ostrov. The only similar one is the church of the Benedictine Abbey of Diakovce. The original face of the church is unknown. It was a single-nave building with a two-tower facade. What the sanctuary once looked like is not known. It is probable that it had the form of an apse with a semi-circular ending, like in the neighboring villages of Mierovo and Alžbetin Dvor, or with a straight end, like in the neighboring village of Hubice.

The church is not a classic brick building because the foundations and the lower part of the towers along with other architectural details are made of stone. The existing polygonal presbytery replaced the apse in the 14th century. An earthquake with the epicentre in Komárno struck the church in 1590. The impaired structure caused the northern tower to collapse. It was rebuilt and simultaneously the original single-nave space was arched with two supporting pillars which changed it into a two-naved space. The northern nave was built out and a two-storey building with a square ground plan was added to the southern tower. The medieval character of the church was enhanced during its renovation in the 1960s and 1970s when the neo-gothic southern entrance hall was removed and the first floor of the southern tower received a pair of composite windows.
