= St. James's Hospital (disambiguation) =

St. James's Hospital may refer to:

- St. James's Hospital, Dublin, Ireland
- St James's University Hospital, Leeds, England
- St James Capua Hospital, Malta
- St James' Hospital, Portsmouth, England
