= St James Street =

St James Street may refer to:

- St James's Street, a road in the St James's district of London, England
- St James Street railway station, a railway station in Waltham Forest, London, England
- St. James Street (Winnipeg) in Winnipeg, Canada
- Saint Jacques Street in Montreal, Canada

== See also ==
- Rue Saint-Jacques (disambiguation)
