= James King (cricketer, born 1869) =

English cricketer

Personal information
- Full name: James King
- Born: 3 May 1869; Lutterworth, Leicestershire
- Died: 8 March 1948 (aged 78); Wisbech, Cambridgeshire
- Batting: Right-handed
- Relatives: John King (son); John King (brother)

Domestic team information
- Years: Team
- 1895–1896: Staffordshire
- 1899–1905: Leicestershire

Career statistics
Competition	First-class
Matches	7
Runs scored	83
Batting average	10.37
100s/50s	0/0
Top score	24*
Balls bowled	205
Wickets	2
Bowling average	73.00
5 wickets in innings	0
10 wickets in match	0
Best bowling	2/71
Catches/stumpings	2/–
- Source: CricInfo, 16 January 2013

James King (3 May 1869 – 8 March 1948) was an English cricketer. King was a right-handed batsman whose bowling style is unknown. He was born at Lutterworth, Leicestershire.

King made his debut for Staffordshire in the counties first Minor Counties Championship match against Cheshire in 1895, a match in which he became the first Staffordshire batsman to make a half century in minor counties cricket. He made seven further Minor Counties Championship appearances for Staffordshire, the last of which came against Northumberland in 1896. Three years later he made his first-class debut for Leicestershire against Yorkshire at Grace Road in the 1899 County Championship. He made six further first-class appearances for the county, the last of which came against Surrey at The Oval in the 1905 County Championship. In his seven matches, he scored a total of 83 runs at an average of 10.37, with a high score of 24 not out. With the ball, he took 2 wickets at a bowling average of 73.00.

He died at Wisbech, Cambridgeshire on 8 March 1948. His son John King played first-class cricket, while his brother, also called John King, played Test cricket for England.
