= James Street Bridge (Kansas City, Kansas) =

- Coordinates: 39.1115°N 94.6165°W
- Carries: 2 lanes of James Street
- Crosses: Kansas River
- Locale: Kansas City, Kansas to Central Industrial District, Kansas City, Kansas
- Maintained by: WyCo Unified Government

Characteristics
- Design: Thru-Truss (first bridge), Girder (second and current bridge)

History
- Opened: 1904 (first bridge), 1987 (second and current bridge)

The James Street Bridge is a car crossing of the Kansas River at Kansas City. It is the second bridge at this location.

The first bridge was built in 1904 as a two lane, thru-truss bridge. The second bridge was built in 1987, as a two lane girder bridge, but using the 1904 pier from the first bridge.
