= St. James Theatre (disambiguation) =

St. James Theatre most commonly refers to:

- St. James Theatre, a Broadway theatre in New York City.

St. James Theatre may also refer to:

== Australia ==
- St. James Theatre, Sydney, a building on Elizabeth Street
- St James' Hall, Sydney, a theatre building on Phillip Street

== New Zealand ==
- St. James Theatre, Auckland
- St. James Theatre, Dunedin (now the Rialto Cinema)
- St. James Theatre, Wellington

== United Kingdom ==
- St James's Theatre, London, demolished in 1957
- St. James Theatre, London, opened in 2012

== United States ==
- St. James Theatre, Boston, Massachusetts
- Fifth Avenue Theatre, New York City, New York (formerly the St. James Theatre; now demolished)
