= James King (cricketer, born 1942) =

English cricketer

Personal information
- Full name: James Morris Roy King
- Born: 15 September 1942 (age 84); Bristol, England
- Batting: Right-handed
- Bowling: Right-arm leg break; Right-arm medium

Domestic team information
- Years: Team
- 1966: Gloucestershire

Career statistics
Competition	First-class
Matches	3
Runs scored	47
Batting average	9.40
100s/50s	0/0
Top score	28
Catches/stumpings	2/–
- Source: Cricinfo, 30 July 2011

James Morris Roy King (born 15 September 1942) is a former English cricketer. King was a right-handed batsman who bowled both leg break and right-arm medium pace. He was born in Bristol.

King made his first-class debut for Gloucestershire against Cambridge University in 1966. He made 2 further first-class appearances, both in 1966, against Glamorgan and Worcestershire in the County Championship. In his 3 first-class matches, he scored 47 runs at an average of 9.40, with a high score of 28.
