= St. James Infirmary =

St. James Infirmary may refer to:

- "St. James Infirmary Blues", an American folk song
- St. James Infirmary Clinic, a medical and social service organization in San Francisco
- St. James Infirmary (album), a 1982 album by Dave Van Ronk
