= Saint James Parish =

Saint James Parish may refer to:

- Saint James Parish, Barbados
- Saint James Parish, Jamaica
- Saint James Parish, New Brunswick, Canada
- St. James Parish, Louisiana, U.S.
- Parish of St James, Cumberland, New South Wales, Australia
- Westminster St James, or St. James Parish, London, UK
