= USS James River =

USS James River has been the name of more than one United States Navy ship, and may refer to:

- USS James River (SP-861), a patrol boat in commission from 1917 to 1918
- USS LSM(R)-510, a medium landing ship (rocket) in commission from 1945 to 1947, which was renamed USS James River (LSM-510) while in reserve and was sold in 1961
