= Saint James College =

Saint James College may refer to:

- St. James College (Shelbyville) in the United States
- St. James College (Brisbane) in Australia
- St. James College (Victoria) in Australia
- St. James Catholic College on Tasmania in Australia
