= Saint James station =

Saint James station may refer to:

== Railway stations in the UK ==
- Cheltenham Spa St. James railway station, formerly in Cheltenham, England
- Paisley St James railway station in Paisley, Renfrewshire, Scotland
- Liverpool St James railway station, England, a disused station in Liverpool
- St James Metro station, on the Tyne and Wear Metro in Newcastle upon Tyne, England

== Railway stations elsewhere ==
- St. James station (LIRR), in St. James, New York, U.S.
- Saint James station (VTA), in San Jose, California, U.S.
- St James railway station, Sydney, Australia
- St James railway station in St James, Cape Town, South Africa

== Other uses ==
- St James Station, New Zealand, a former high country sheep and cattle station

== See also ==
- Saint James (disambiguation)
- St James Park railway station in Exeter, England
- St James's Park tube station, on the London Underground
- St. James Street railway station, in Walthamstow, London, England
