= St. James Academy =

St. James Academy or St James Academy may refer to:

- St. James Academy (Kansas), United States
- St James Academy, Dudley, West Midlands, England
- St. James Academy (Malabon), Philippines

== See also ==
- St. James School (disambiguation) (includes similar name forms)
