= James King (cricketer, born 1855) =

English cricketer

Personal information
- Born: 1855; Southampton, Hampshire
- Died: Unknown
- Batting: Left-handed
- Bowling: Left-arm fast

Domestic team information
- Years: Team
- 1881: Kent
- 1882: Hampshire

Career statistics
Competition	First-class
Matches	3
Runs scored	39
Batting average	9.75
100s/50s	0/0
Top score	16*
Balls bowled	404
Wickets	10
Bowling average	22.30
5 wickets in innings	0
10 wickets in match	0
Best bowling	4/64
Catches/stumpings	3/–
- Source: Cricinfo, 26 January 2010

James King (born 1855 – date of death unknown), also possibly known as John King, was an English professional cricketer who played in three first-class cricket matches between 1881 and 1882.

King was born at Southampton in Hampshire in 1855. He played twice in first-class matches for Kent County Cricket Club in 1881 against Marylebone Cricket Club (MCC) and Derbyshire before playing once the following year for Hampshire against Somerset.

There is some doubt that the same man played for both Kent and Hampshire, and very little is known about King's life. It is possible that he was a carpenter and lived at Tonbridge in Kent with his wife, who was born in the town, at the 1881 Census. His date of death is unknown.

== Bibliography ==
- Carlaw, Derek (2020). Kent County Cricketers, A to Z: Part One (1806–1914) (PDF). Cardiff: ACS.
