= St. James Elementary School =

St. James Elementary School may refer to:

- St. James Elementary School (Louisville)
- St. James Elementary School (Myrtle Beach)
- St. James Elementary School (New York City)
