= St. James Park (Toronto) =

Park in Toronto, Ontario, Canada

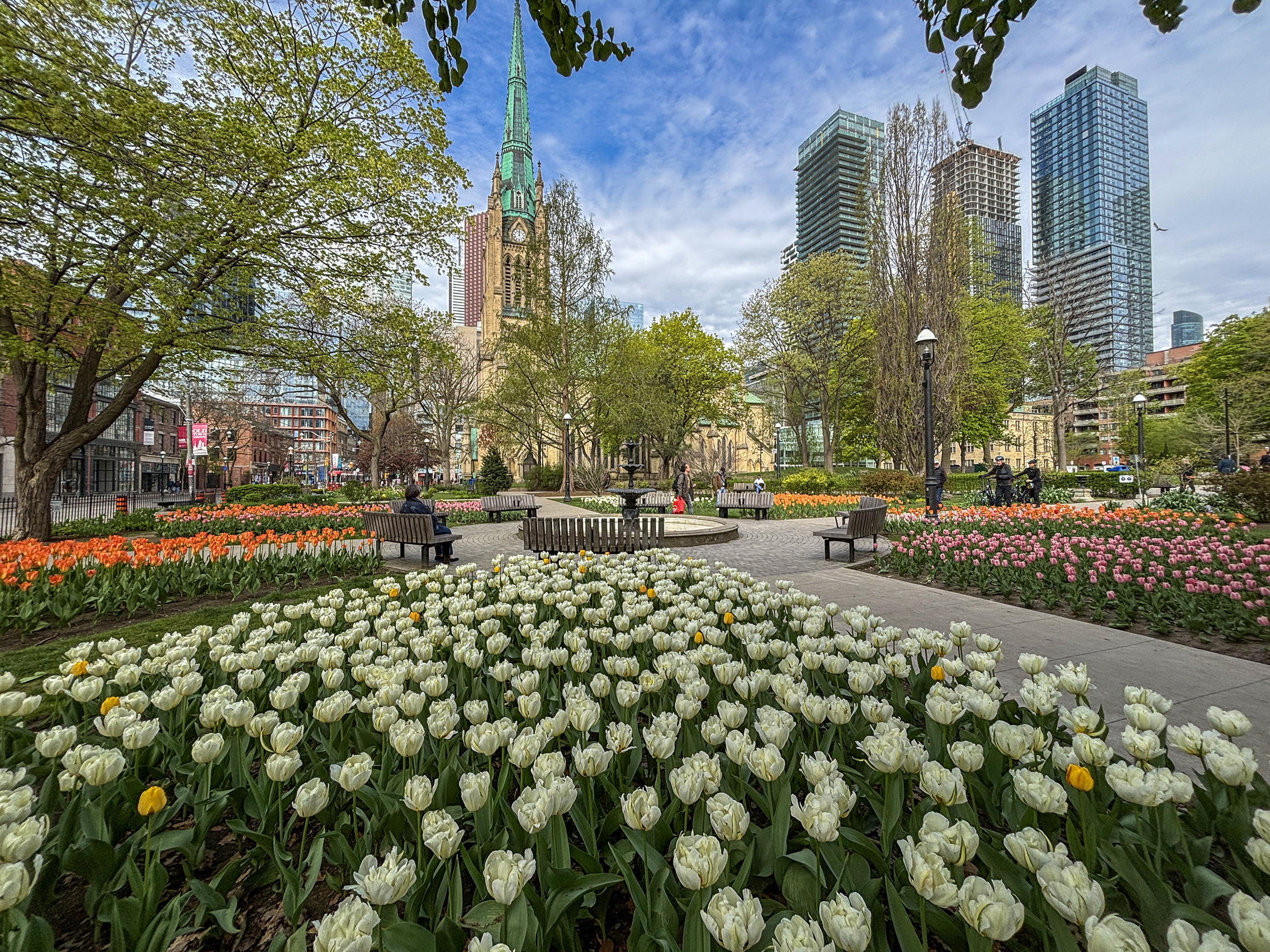
- View of the formal gardens and fountain, with Cathedral Church of St. James (Toronto) in the background
- Interactive map of St. James Park
- Location: 120 King Street East; Toronto, Ontario
- Coordinates: 43°39′03″N 79°22′23″W
- Operator: Toronto Parks
- Website: St. James Park webpage

St. James Park is an urban public park that is owned by both the neighbouring Cathedral Church of St. James and the City of Toronto government. The park has a central fountain and a gazebo.

== Description and history ==
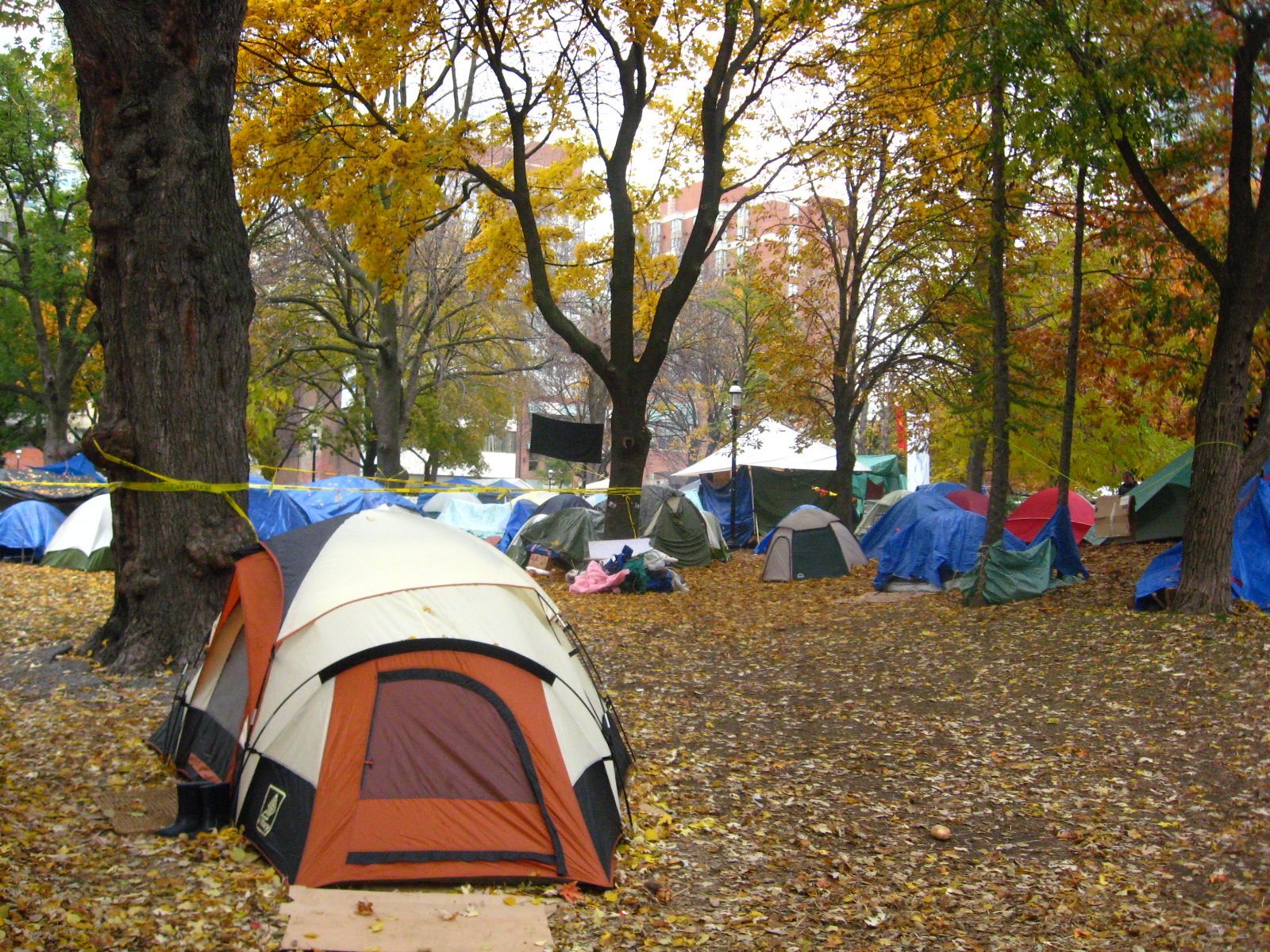
Tents in the park during Occupy Toronto, 2011

The park is bounded by the Cathedral Church of St. James to the west, Adelaide Street East to the north, Jarvis Street to the east, and King Street to the south. It is located across King Street from St. Lawrence Hall.

The park was created in the early 20th century (the east and south sides around the park required demolition of a series of three-storey buildings). The park's postmodern landscaping is Victorian-inspired, with formal gardens and a water fountain. Two walkways with park benches cross the park diagonally, with a large ornamental gazebo in the middle functioning as a central meeting place. The formal gardens are located in the southern quadrant of the park as defined by the X-shaped walkway plan, and the formal gardens have two paths intersecting at the fountain. Maintenance of the park is performed by Toronto Parks staff, and the formal gardens are tended by members of the Garden Club of Toronto. The park is often used for wedding photo shoots.

In fall 2011, the park was occupied by members of Occupy Toronto. The park had a rat problem in 2015.
