= Occupy Toronto =

Protest group against economic inequality

- Part of the Occupy movement
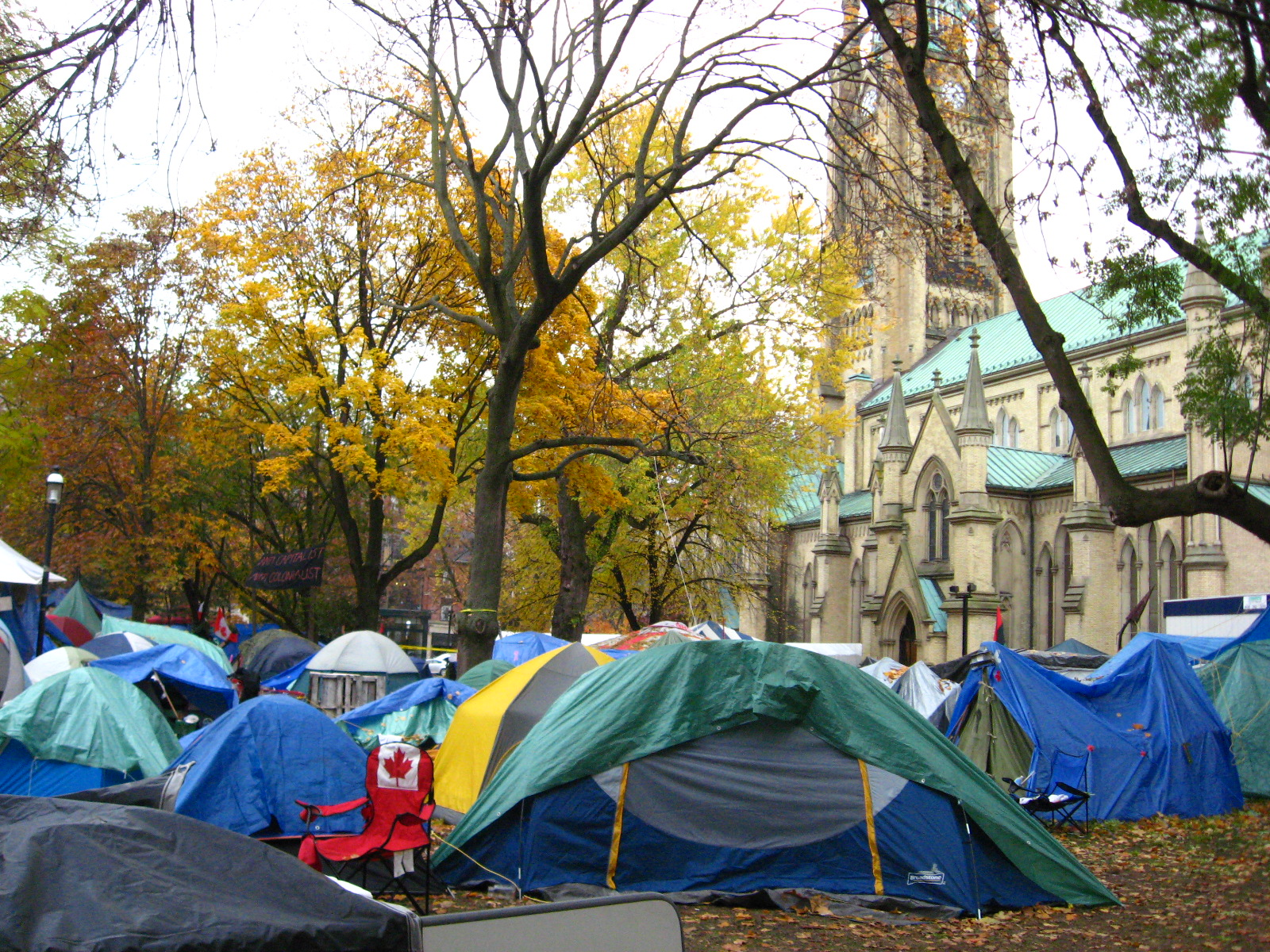
- Tents next to the Cathedral Church of St. James
- Date: 15 October 2011 – 2012
- Location: St. James Park, Toronto, Ontario
- Caused by: Economic inequality, corporate influence over government, inter alia.
- Methods: Demonstration, occupation, protest, street protesters

Number
- Protesters: Varies greatly

Arrests and injuries
- Injuries: 1
- Arrested: 5

Occupy Toronto was a protest and demonstration that began on October 15, 2011, in Toronto, Ontario, near Bay Street in Downtown Toronto's Financial District and moved to St. James Park. It was a part of the Occupy movement, which protested against economic inequality, corporate greed, and the influence of corporations and lobbyists on government.

As of June 2012, Occupy Toronto had continued to engage in semi-organized meetings, events and actions.

== Chronology of events ==
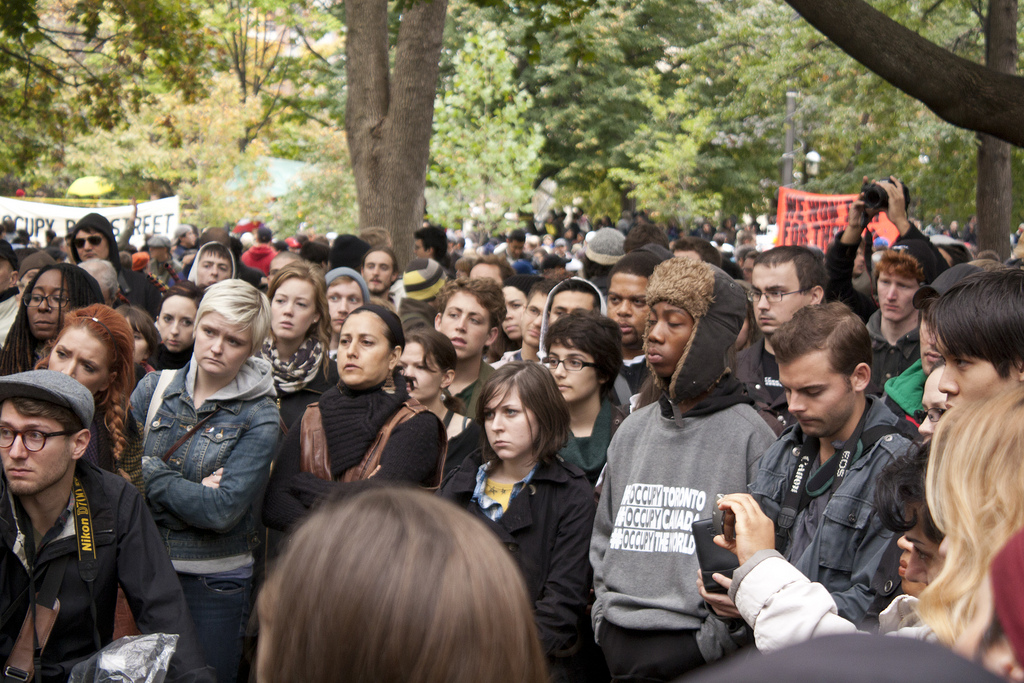
Occupy Toronto protesters on October 15th, 2011

=== Global Day of Action ===
Demonstrators gathered at the intersection of King St. and Bay St. at around 10 am on the 15 October 2011 Global Day of Action and then moved to St. James Park while stressing the importance of a peaceful demonstration and the desire to be heard as a single voice. Early numbers put the visible turnout fluctuating at between 2000 and 3000 participants, including NDP MP Peggy Nash, Joel Duff of the Ontario Federation of Labour, and CUPE Ontario President Fred Hahn. After the first few hours, as the sunset progressed the numbers significantly dropped into the hundreds.

The Canadian Union of Postal Workers marched over to the intersection after lunch and met up with the protesters. After a large crowd gathered at the Bay Street entrance to the Toronto-Dominion Bank, five people entered the bank and security detained them before removing them from the branch.

=== St. James Park ===
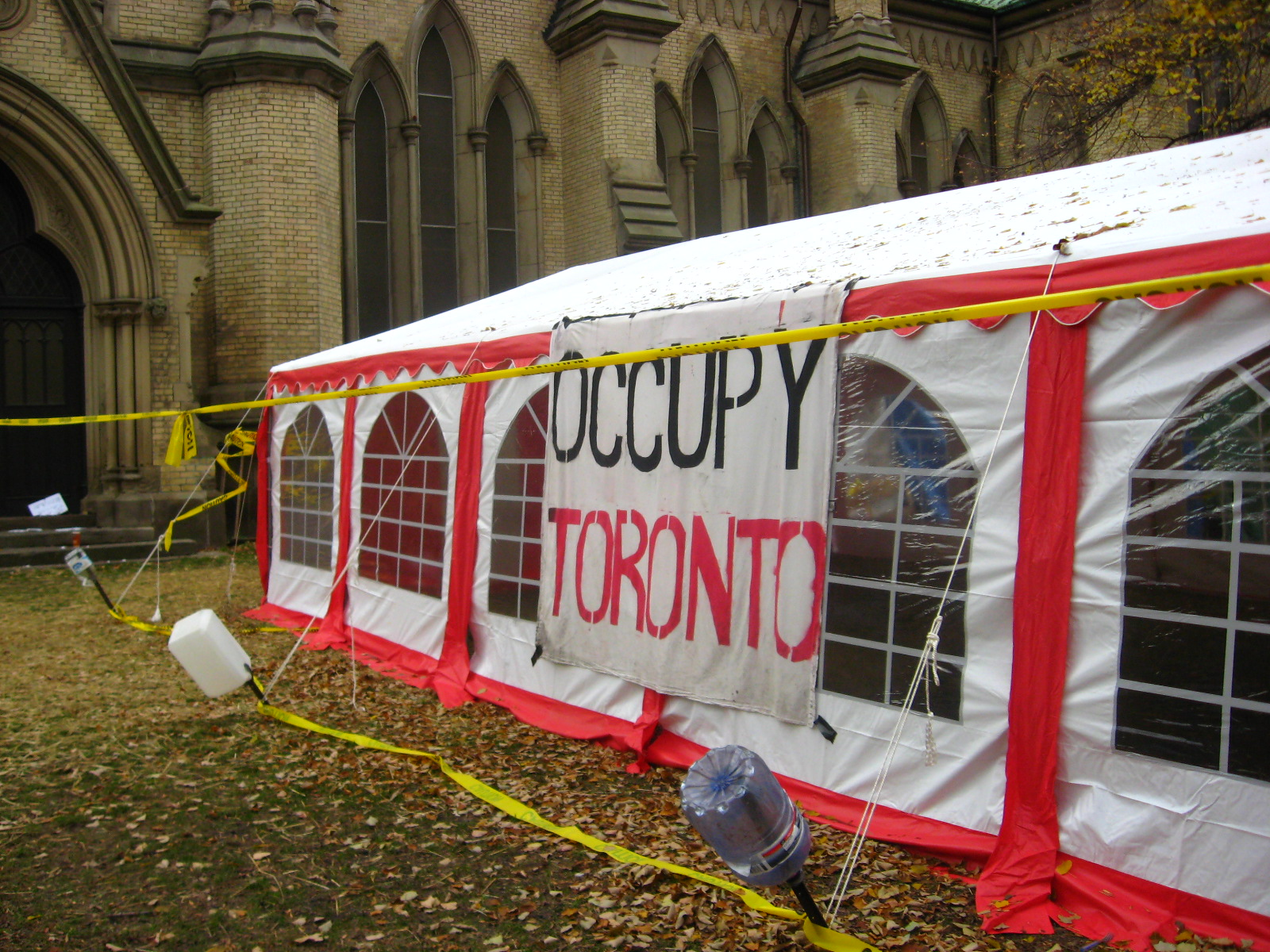
Occupy Toronto tent next to the Cathedral Church of St James

Almost two weeks after the protest began, occupiers still maintained their unlawful presence in St. James Park with no threat of removal by the municipal government and scheduled a march on Bay Street for 1 pm on October 27. During that occupation, after the protesters had caused the backup of 10 westbound King streetcars and six streetcars eastbound, bicycle police cleared hundreds of postal workers and other protesters from the intersection of King and Bay streets.

In preparation for an indeterminable length of occupation, a solar panel was installed to provide electricity in the media tent and the "Winter's Coming Committee" is drawing up plans to "freeze-proof" the camp.

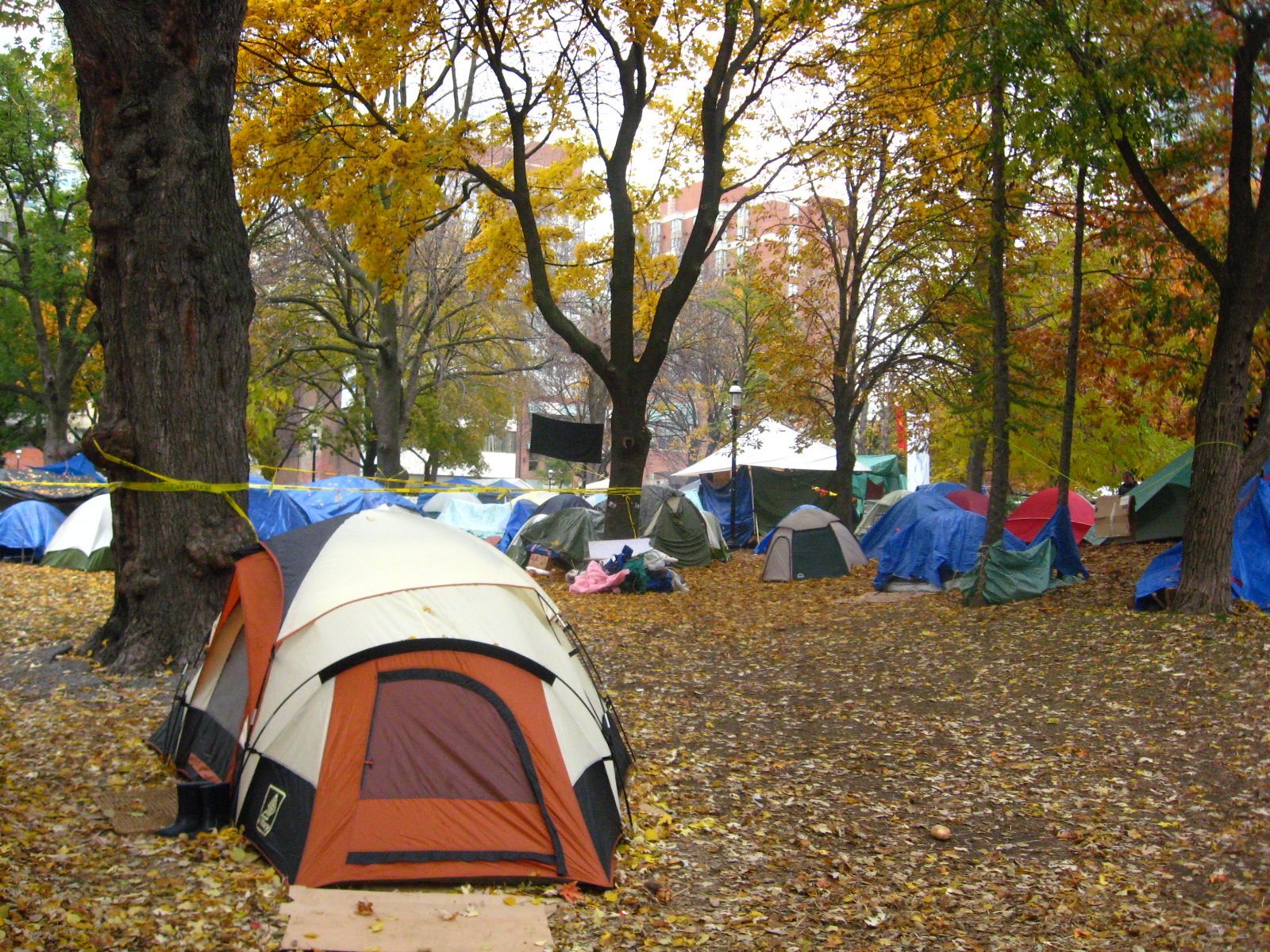
Tents in St James Park

In the hours after another protest on November 2, the media reported developments of the current municipal reaction: "They're still squatting in that park against the law," said Patrick McMurray who owns a restaurant across the street from the park. -He says he's losing business because customers are afraid to come downtown. In response to his concerns, McMurray received an email this week from [Rob] Ford saying, "When it is determined that we no longer have a peaceful protest, but rather an occupation of the park, we will consider options to remove the individuals who are camping in the park."

On November 9, Mayor Ford was quoted as saying that it was time for the Occupy stragglers to "move on", citing the need to repair the estimated $25,000 damage to the grass and what could become a $40,000 repair to the sprinkler system pipes if they are not drained before winter. Premier Dalton McGuinty was reported as saying that the protest was a municipal issue and that his office would not be making decisions in relation to its presence.

On November 11, Robyn Doolittle of The Toronto Star reported various comments from inside the camp, including answers to the questions of local public outrage and the prospect of being removed, to which occupiers answered: "I think the public outrage has been magnificently exaggerated. Teachers are bringing schoolchildren here all day to come and talk with us and learn why we're here." -and, "We'll just come back. Our legal people are looking into this."

On November 12, CBC News reported that protesters had started setting up an occupation in Queen's Park, which the majority of occupiers remaining in St. James Park.

During the morning of November 15, Toronto Police and bylaw officers began distributing eviction notices to campers.

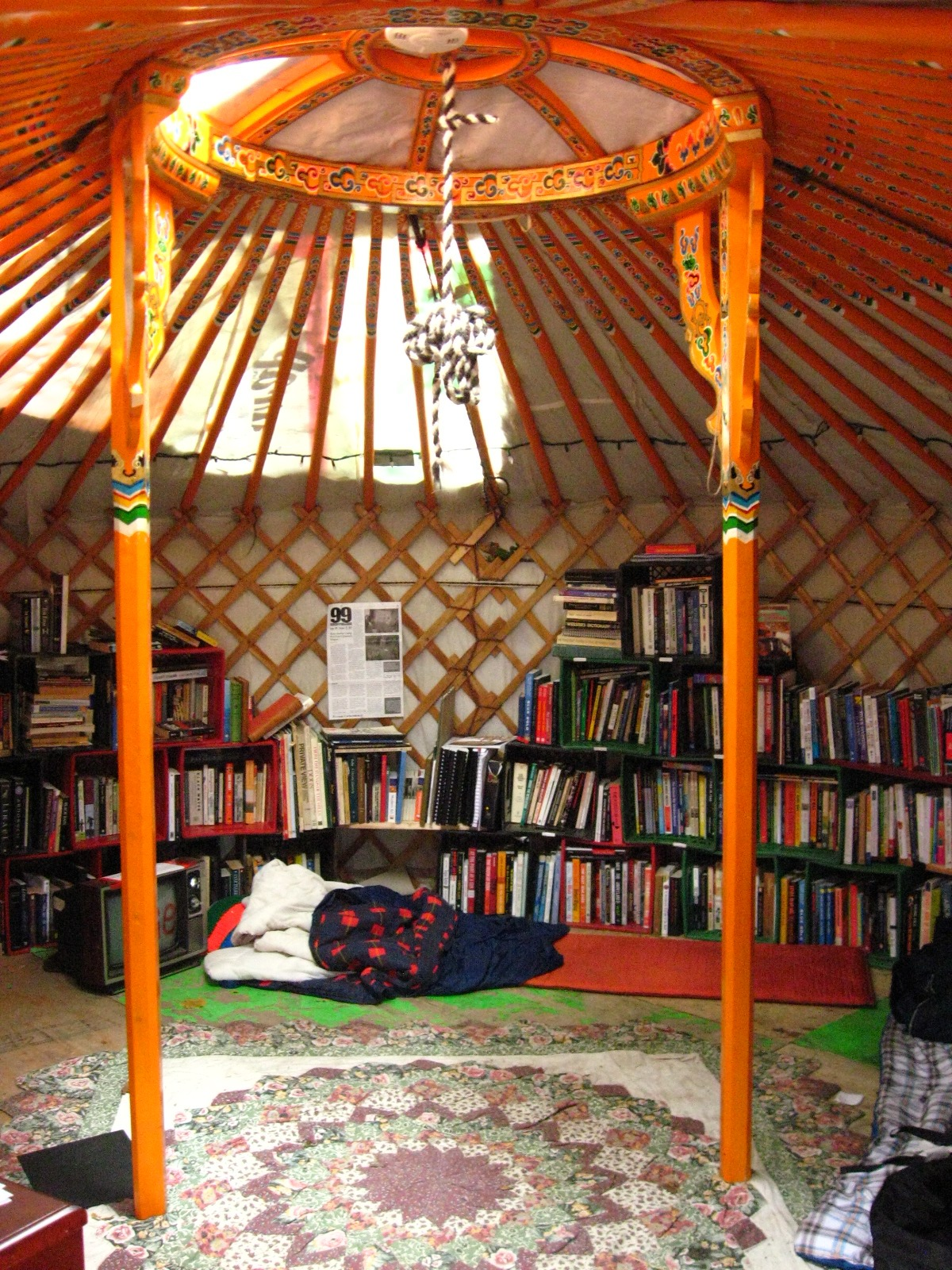
The Yurt Library in St James Park was eventually dismantled by the police.

On November 21, Bylaw officers and police, following a Superior Court judge ruling, handed out trespass notices to those camped on church property. No clear definition as to what part of the park is city owned and which part is church owned has been offered and occupiers have already made many changes to the camp to fortify it against a forced dismantling by authorities. On November 22, it was reported that the camp was smaller, but that the yurt housing the library was barricaded and had men chained to it and that the native tent was also barricaded and the sacred fire inside continued to smoke.

On the morning of November 23, Toronto Police began enforcing the eviction notice by dismantling most of the tents that still remained. The area surrounding St. James Park was barricaded to traffic. The Yurt Library was also dismantled, but protesters negotiated with police to have the books preserved, and some protesters vowed to regroup elsewhere.

== Response ==
=== Non-occupying support ===
As of November 4, it was estimated that thousands of supporters are helping the roughly 500 people occupying St. James Park, including those considered to be in the privileged "1%". A group of seven unions, led by the Ontario Public Service Employees Union, installed porta-potties, generators, Mongolian yurts and a 28-foot mobile kitchen. Other donations include straw from the president of a hydraulics company, and 250 compostable bags of water from the owner of a waste-water technology company, who said: "There needs to be a correction of how global financial businesses work. Something is wrong. Hopefully, this helps them [the occupiers] buy more time to help keep the pressure up until something more concrete comes out of it." Members of the legal community who do not necessarily share the views of the protesters have also offered their support, including legal advice, but with other logistics as well.

=== Politicians ===
On the first day of protests, Toronto Mayor Rob Ford told CTV Toronto: "I have no problem with citizens expressing themselves through the public rally and I don't expect the event to turn violent. If people want to protest peacefully, that is fine. And I am sure it is going to be a peaceful protest."

=== Corporate heads ===
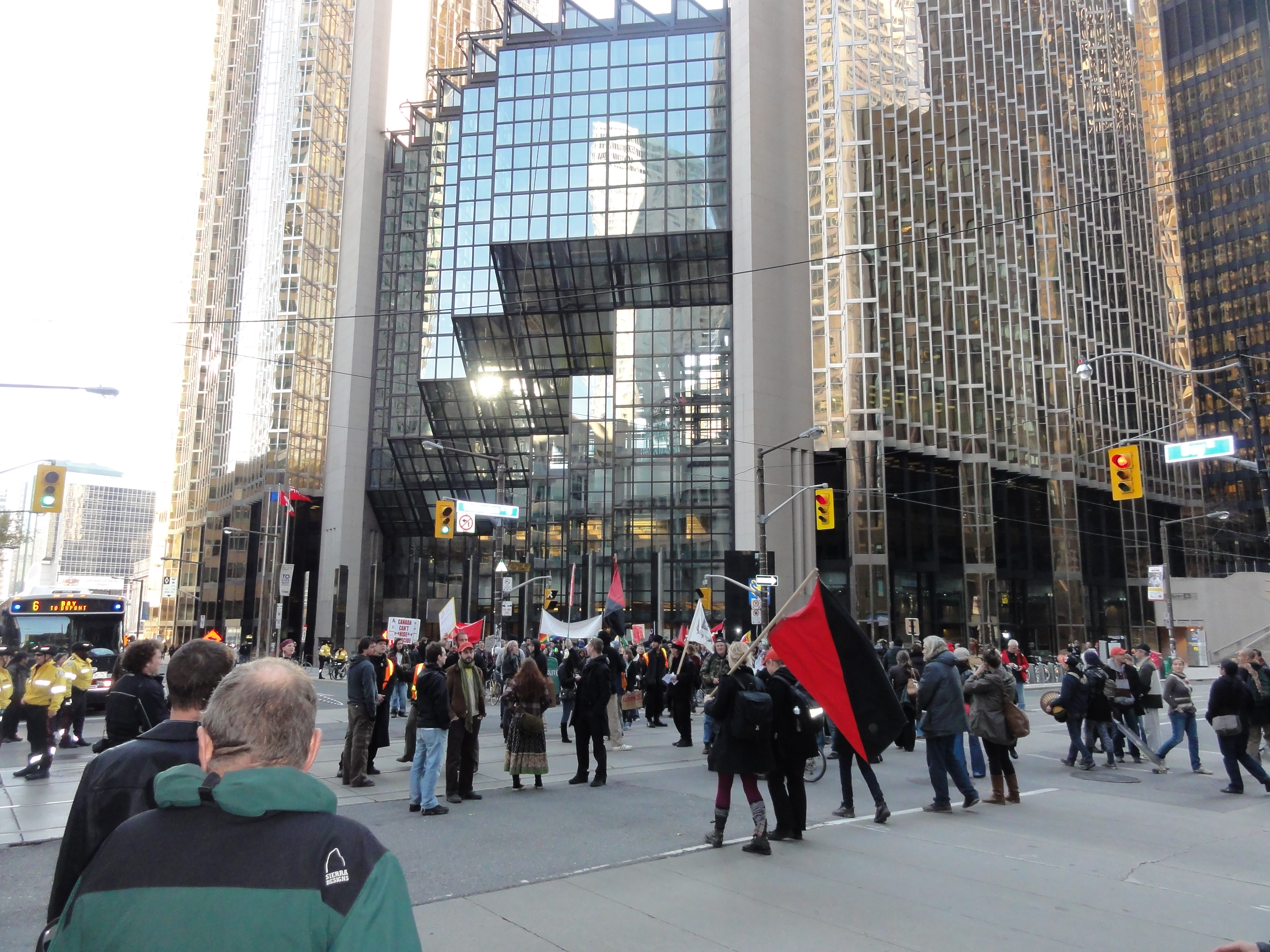
Occupy Bay Street in Toronto's financial district.

The Canadian Bankers Association told its members to "prepare for the worst, hope for the best," while a number of downtown banks ordered extra security in preparation. Also, CTV News obtained an internal memo from Toronto-Dominion Bank, telling employees they were working with "external partners" to maintain the security of their branches.

The CEO of TD Bank, Ed Clark was asked what advice he might give to the protesters. His answer was "My main advice is stick to your guns. When people say, 'You don't have a solution,' say, 'Of course we don't. If there was a solution, don't you think people would be doing it?' To ask the people who occupy Wall Street or Bay Street to have a full answer is absurd. They're doing their job which is to say, 'If you think this [system] is working for everyone, it's not.' Now they have to figure out how not to get captured by special interest and keep the pressure on. We need people to talk about these problems and how we're going to solve them.". TD head Ed Clark was a close second to top earning bankers according to an article in the November 2011 issue of Toronto Life, earning $11,426,795.

=== Media ===
On October 14, 2011, the tabloid paper, The Toronto Sun published thoughts from columnist Joe Warmington: "If this event is real, and I have to admit I am skeptical but am trying to keep an open mind and let it unfold as it does, there will be legitimate demonstrators pointing out how the middle class is being eroded and how taxes are too high or not high enough and how jobs are hard to come by and other concerns. No problem because it's true. But if it becomes a Marxist whine-fest or a Black Bloc gang spoiling for a violent fight with the cops, there will not be much tolerance and acceptance from Torontonians who even though they sometimes scold their cops, still respect, appreciate and love them."

On November 11, The Toronto Star columnist David Olive wrote: "Certainly, this is the hour of our discontent. That discontent is income inequality. The spectacular disparity between the super-affluent and the rest of us is a leading, if not root, cause of widespread ill health, stunted education opportunity, and intolerably high rates of crime and racial discrimination in our communities."

== Gallery ==
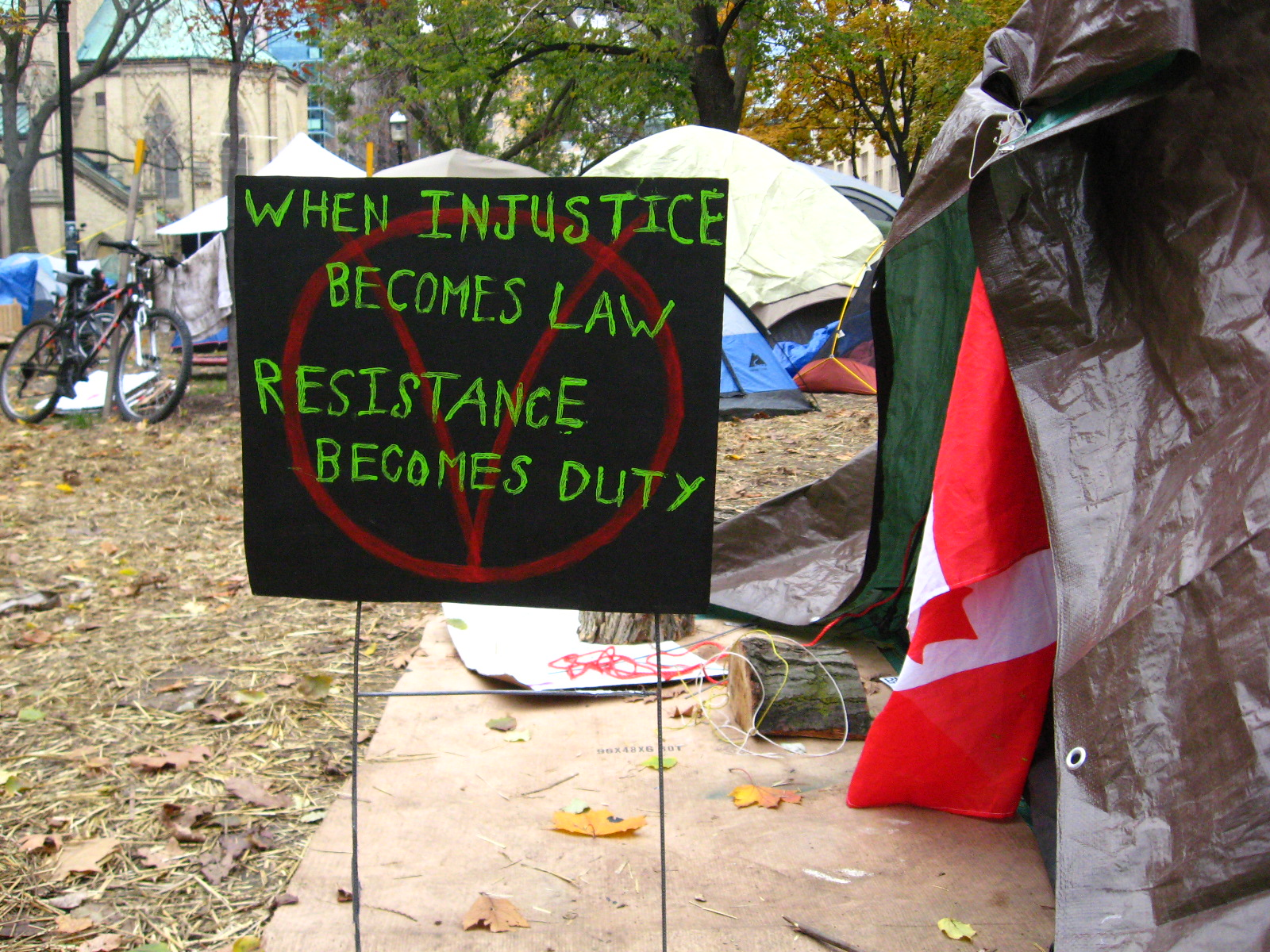

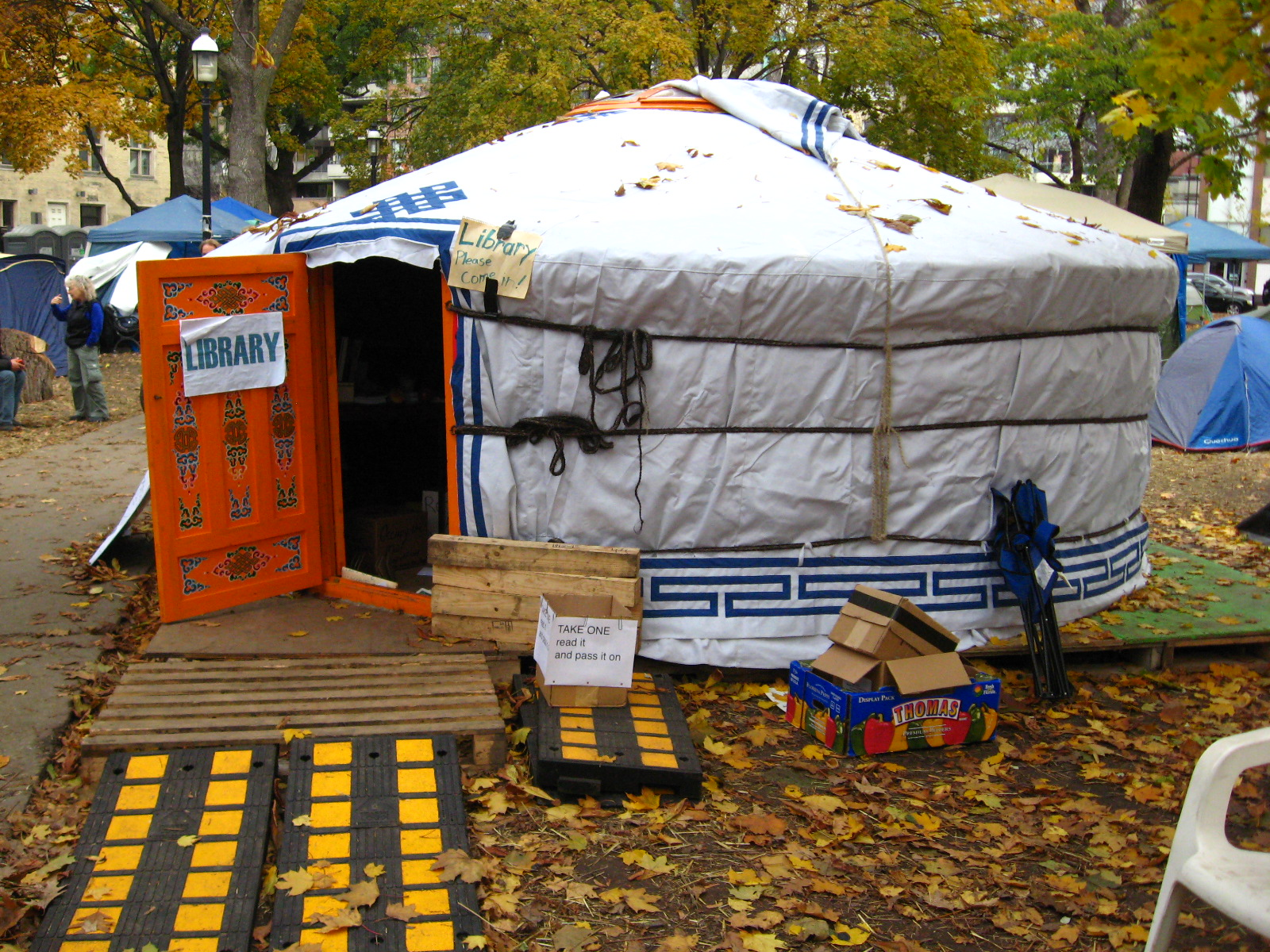

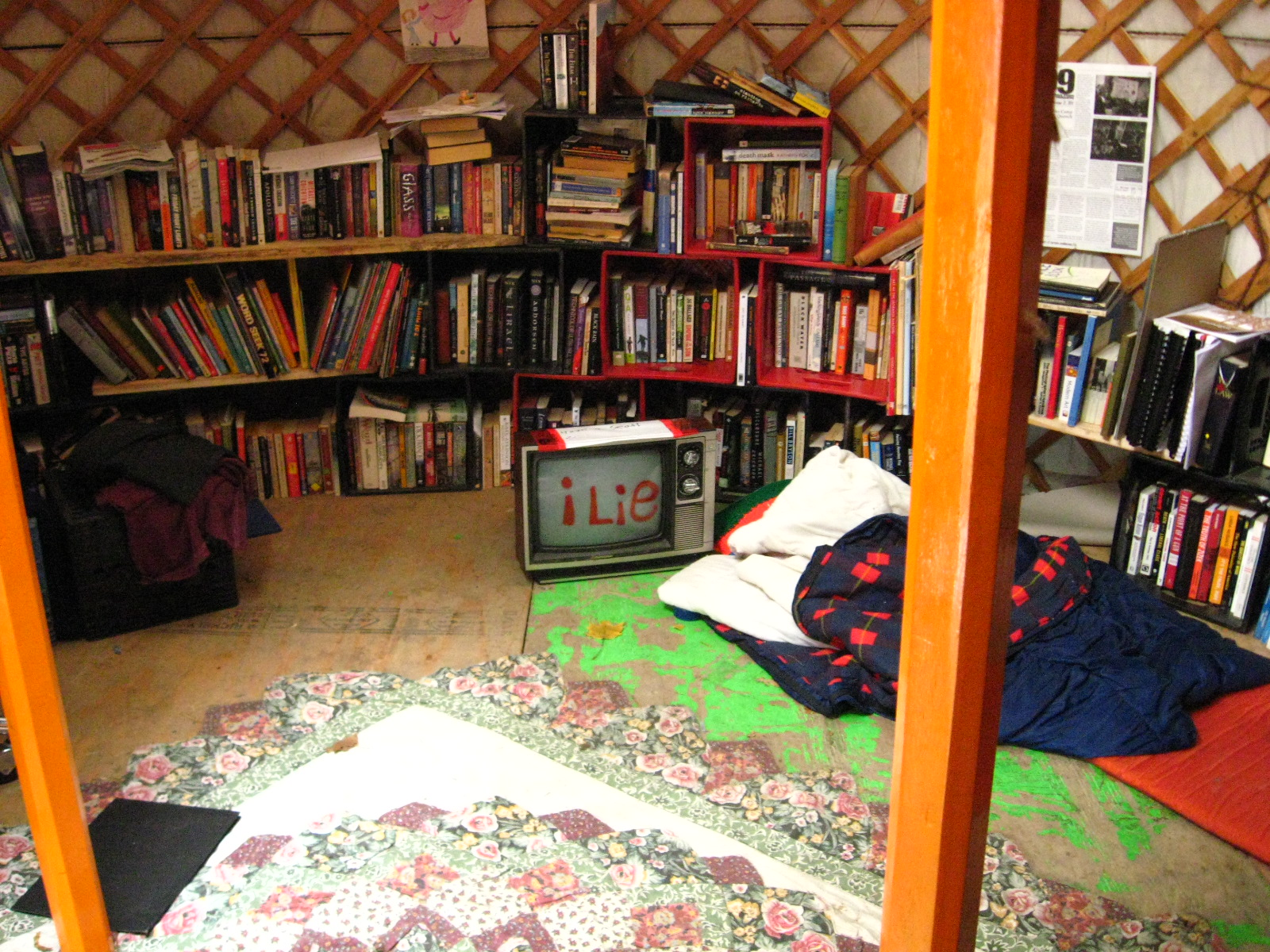

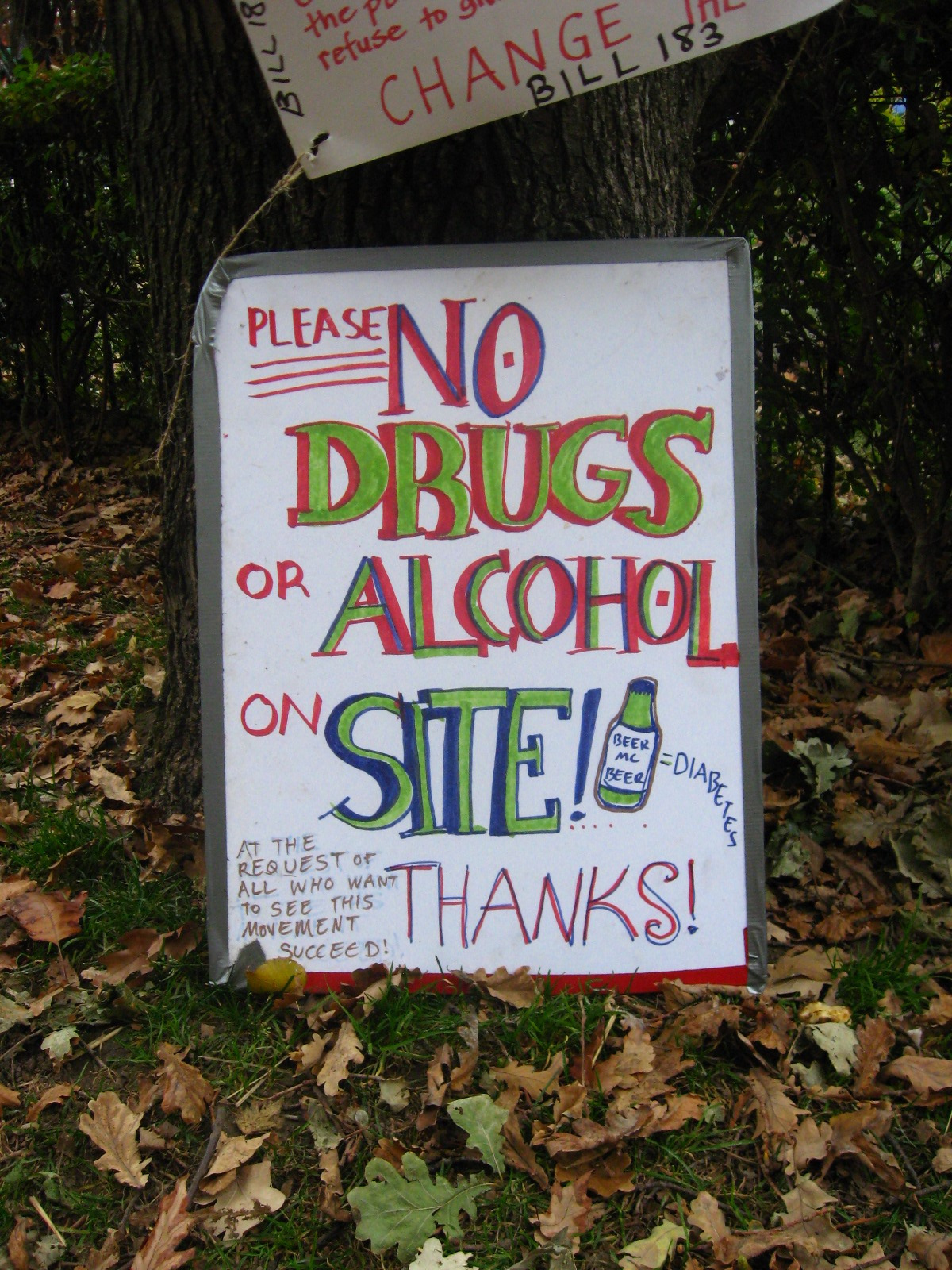

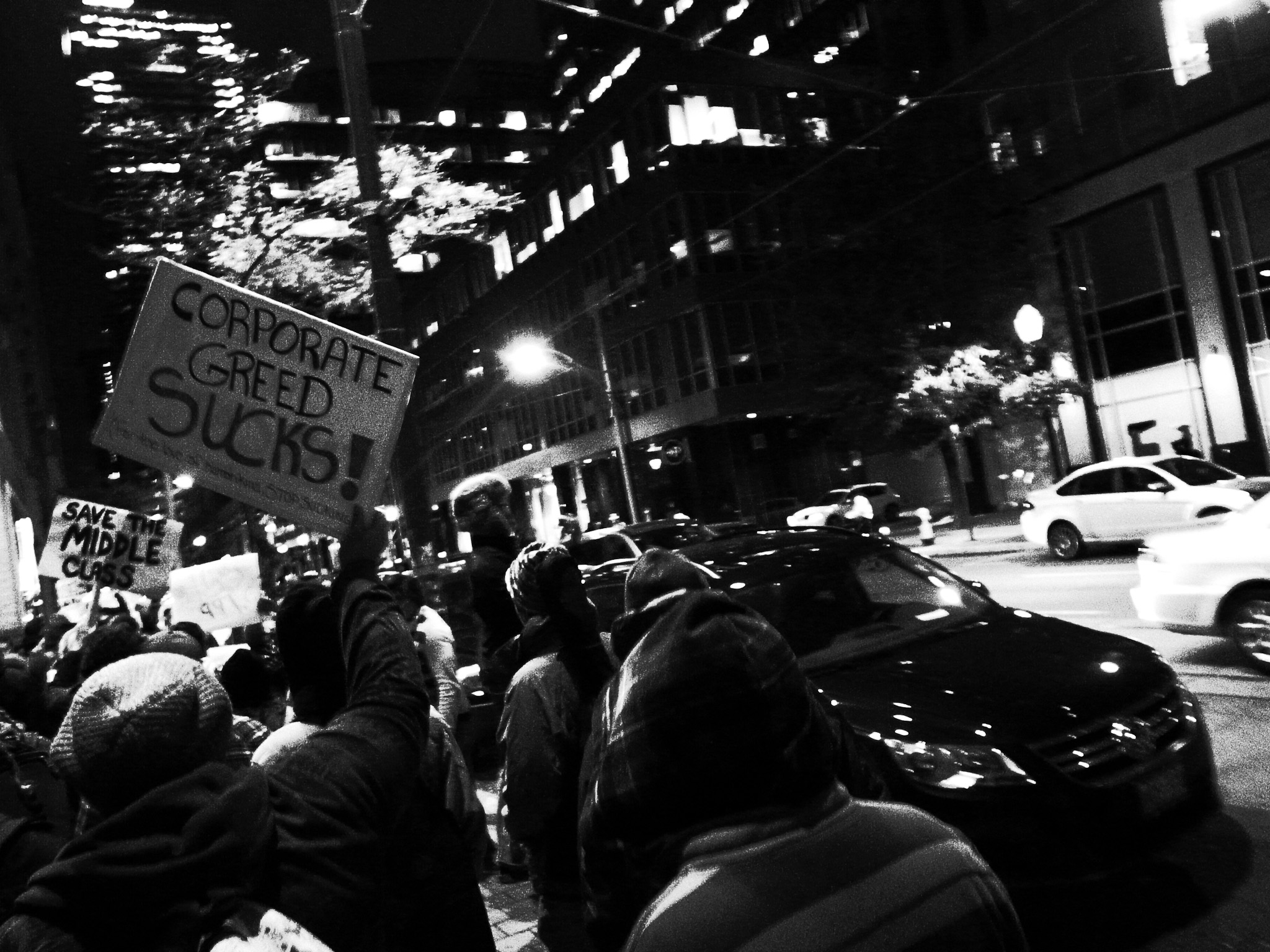

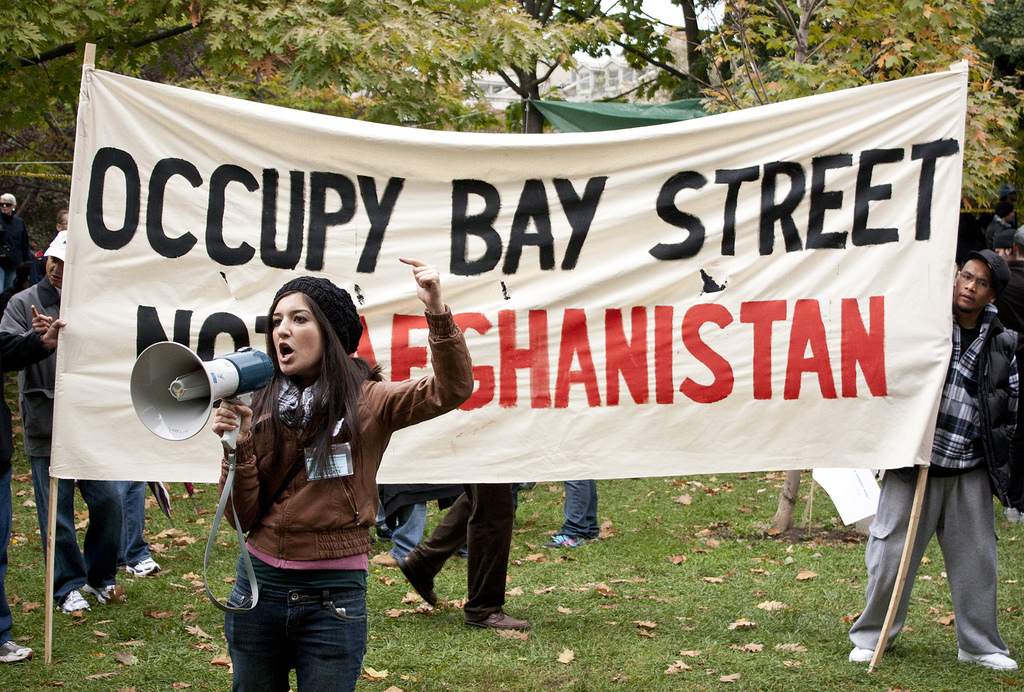

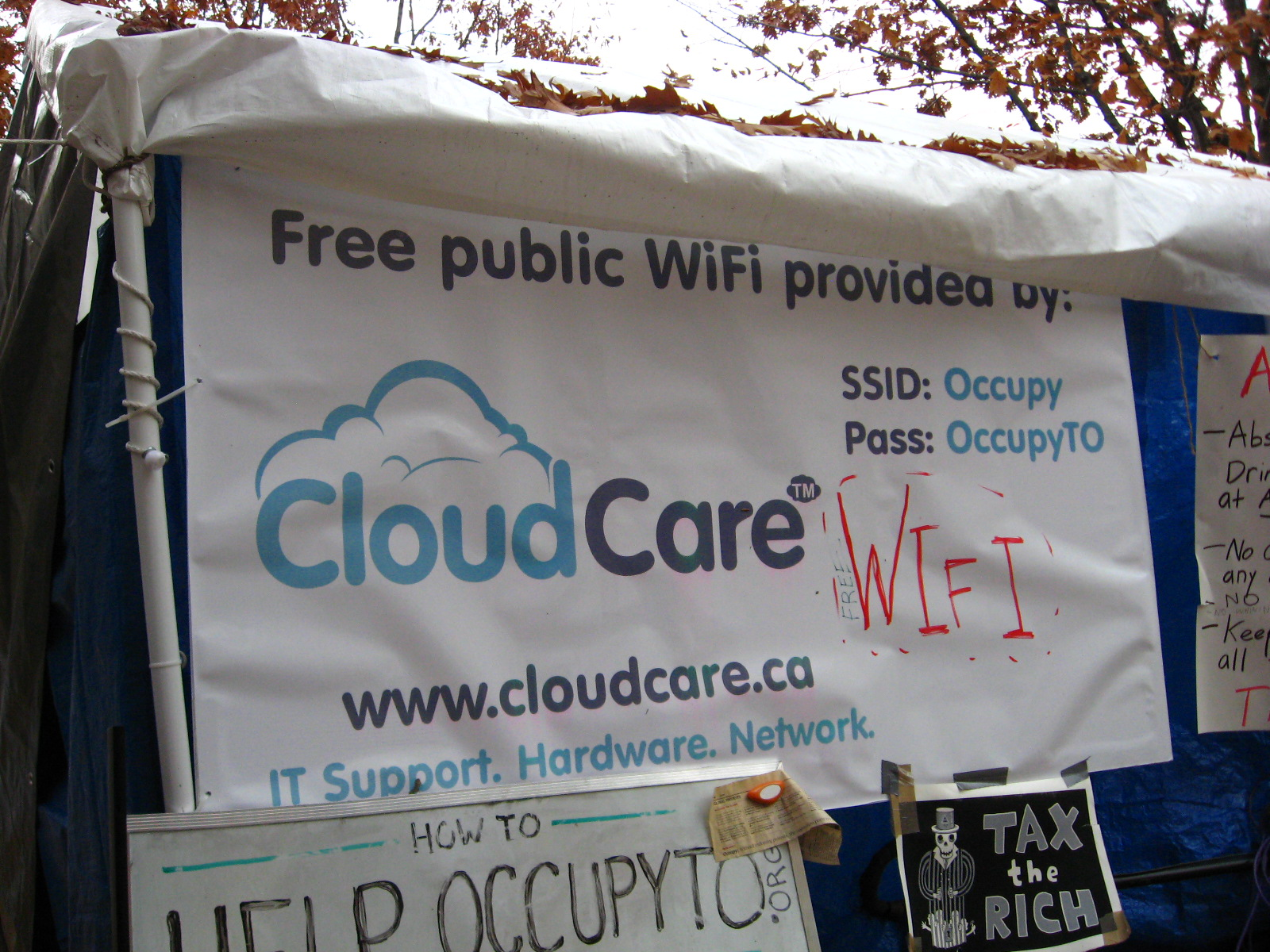

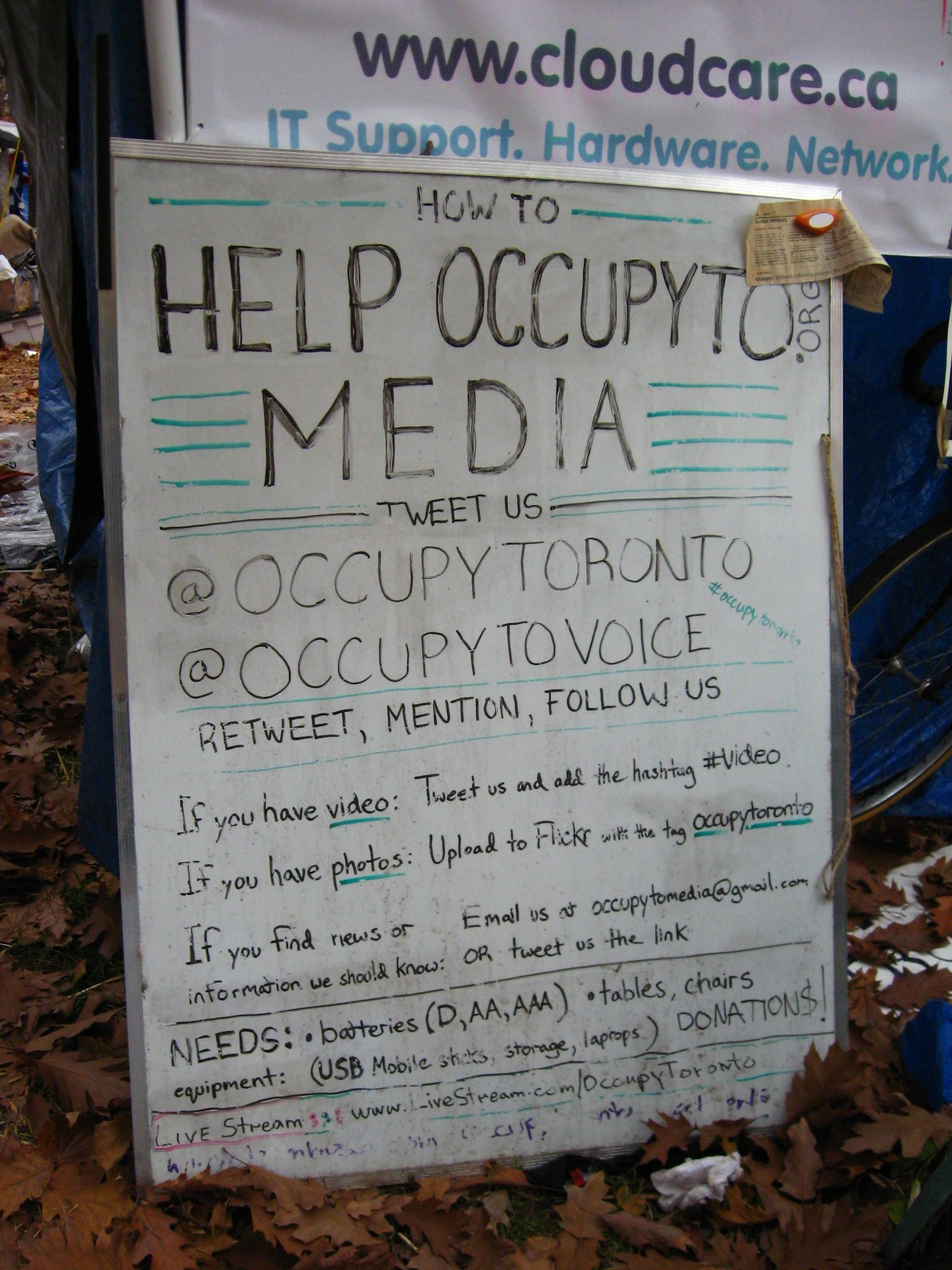

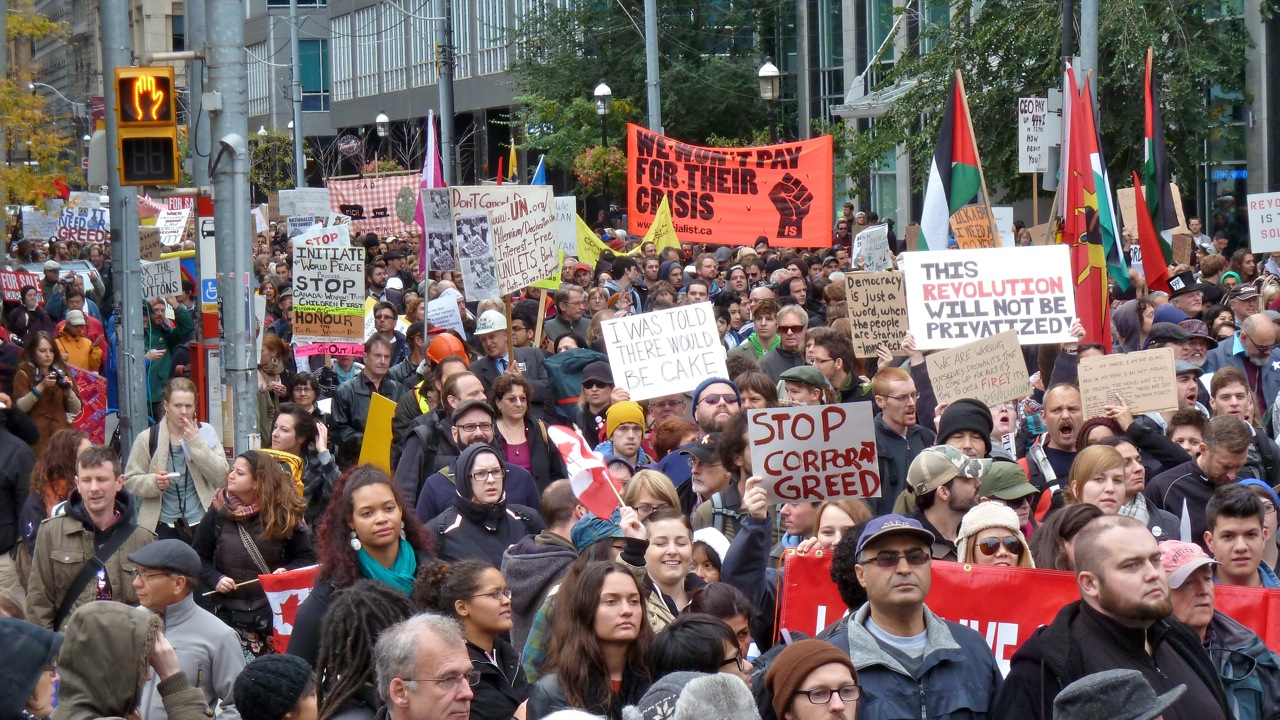

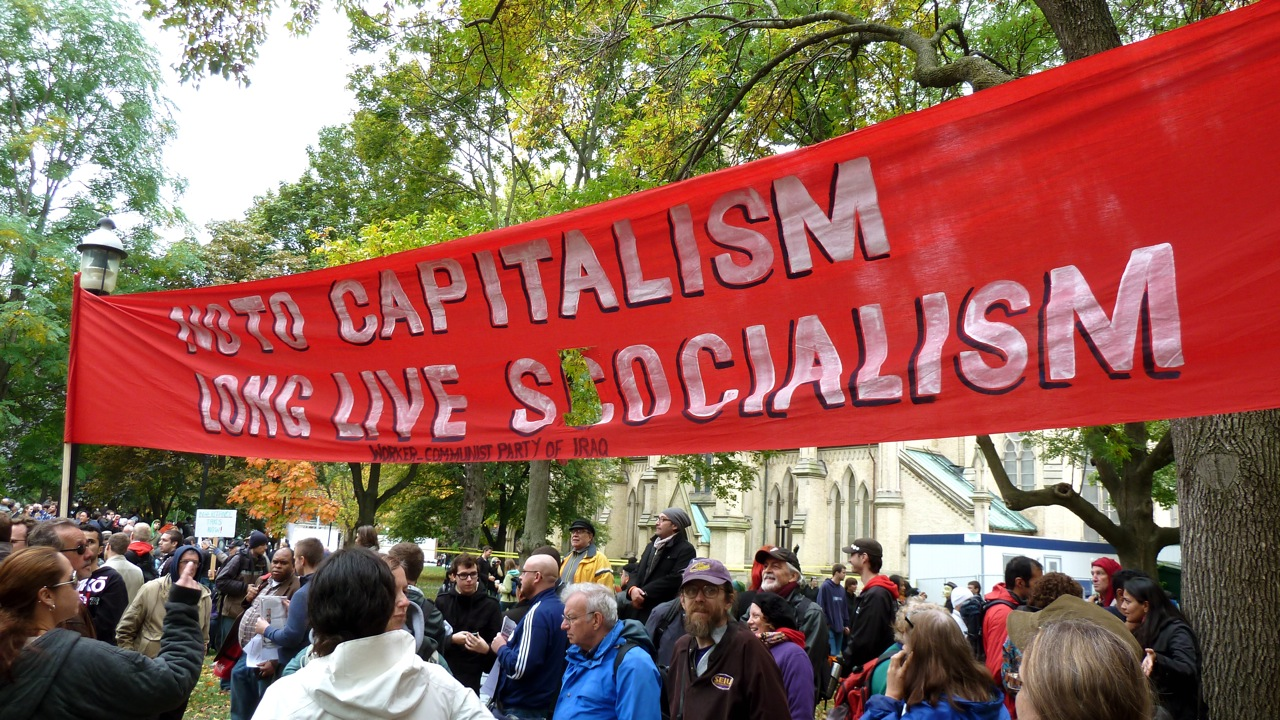

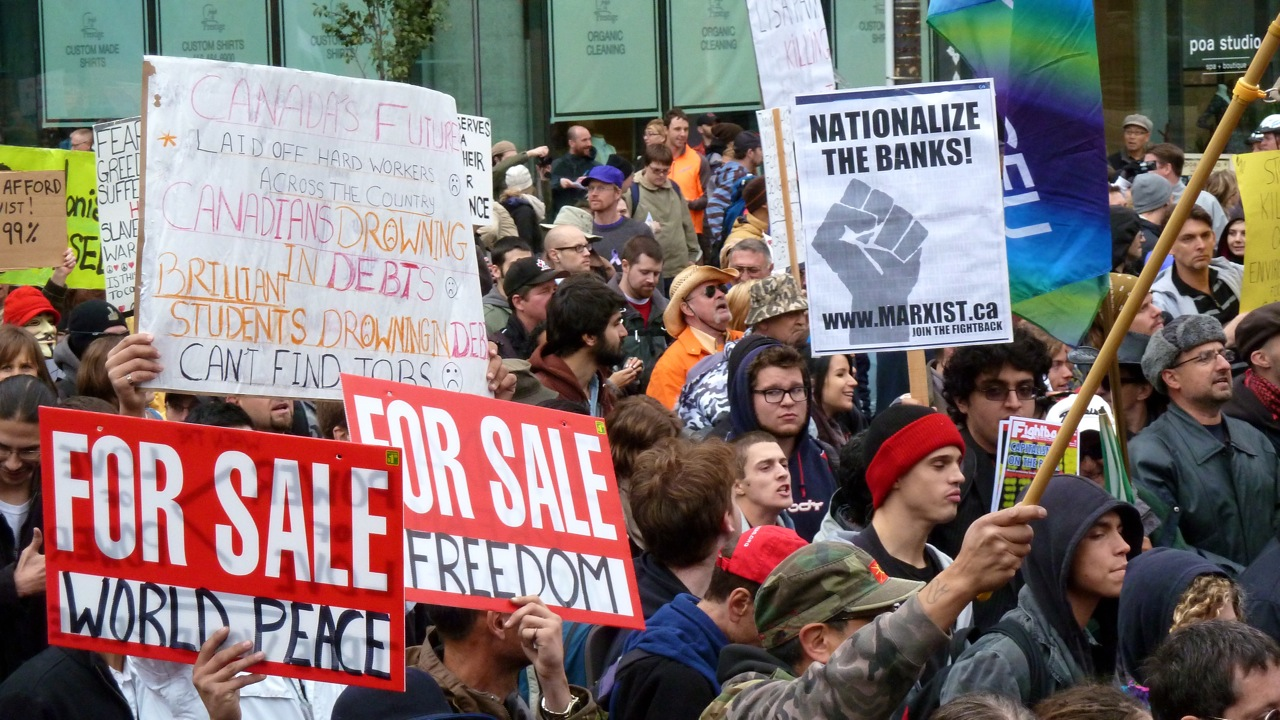

== See also ==
Occupy articles

- Occupy Canada
- List of global Occupy movement protest locations
- Occupy movement
- Timeline of Occupy Wall Street
- We are the 99%

Other Protests

- 15 October 2011 global protests
- 2011 United States public employee protests
- 2011 Wisconsin protests

Related articles

- Arab Spring
- Corporatocracy
- Corruption Perceptions Index
- Economic inequality
- Federal political financing in Canada
- Grassroots movement

- Income inequality in the United States
- Plutocracy
- Protest
- The Corporation (film)
- The Shock Doctrine
- Voter turnout in Canada
- Wealth inequality in the United States
