= SS King James =

Two ships of the King Line were named King James.

- SS King James (1925), in service 1925–35, built by Harland and Wolff for King Line
- SS King James (1943), in service 1950–58
