= Prince James =

Prince James may refer to:

- James I of Scotland (1394–1437)
- James II of Scotland (1430–1460)
- James III of Scotland (1451/52–1488)
- James IV of Scotland (1473–1513)
- James V of Scotland (1512–1543)
- James I of England (1566–1625)
- James II of England (1633–1701)
- James Francis Edward Stuart (1688–1766), nicknamed "The Old Pretender", son of the deposed James II of England, and as such laid claim to the English and Scottish thrones
- James, Earl of Wessex (born 2007), grandson of Elizabeth II
