= St. James High School (Philippines) =

Roman Catholic school in Agusan del Norte, Philippines

Saint James High School
- Mataas na Paaralan ni Señor Santiago (Filipino)
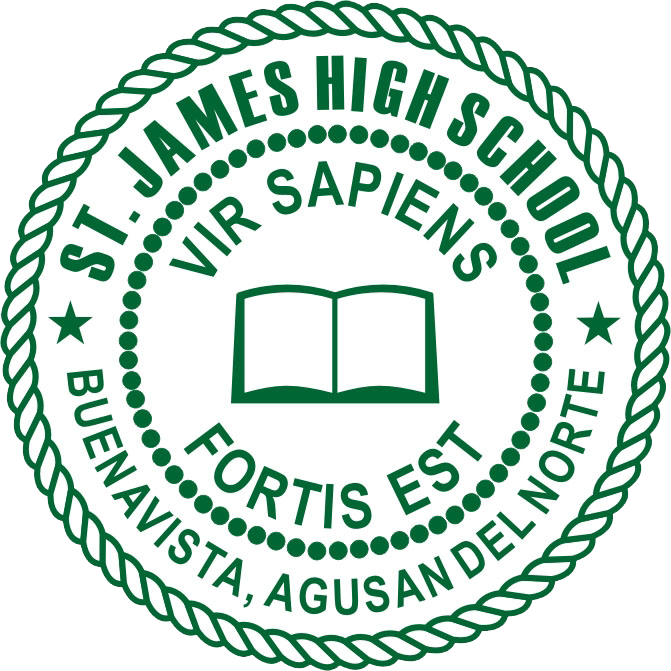

Location
- Buenavista, Agusan del Norte; Philippines
- Coordinates: 8°58′31″N 125°24′23″E

Information
- Other names: Saint James High; Saint James; SJ; SJHS
- Former names: St. James Elementary School (1939–1947)
- Type: Private sectarian
- Motto: Vir Sapiens Fortis Est ("A wise man is a strong man.")
- Established: June 1939 (ES); June 1948 (HS)
- Director: Rev. Fr. Marlon Lacal, O. Carm., Ph.D.
- Principal: Merly P. Abiva, Ph.D.
- Faculty: 42
- Enrollment: 1,600+
- Colors: Green; White; Gold
- Athletics: Jamenian Green Warriors
- Nickname: Jamenians
- Newspaper: Equine Echoes
- Affiliations: Philippine Society of Youth Science Clubs (PSYSC); Catholic Educational Association of the Philippines (CEAP)
- Annexes: St. James Kindergarten School formerly Sacred Heart Kindergarten

St. James High School (SJHS) is a private school under the Roman Catholic order, founded by the priests of the Missionaries of the Sacred Heart, located in Buenavista, Agusan del Norte and run by the Diocese of Butuan (Butuan, Philippines).

The main campus of the institution is located at the eastern area of the Parish grounds, where a 2-story building with 14 classrooms is located. It is the only Catholic school in the town.

== History ==
The building's left entrance.

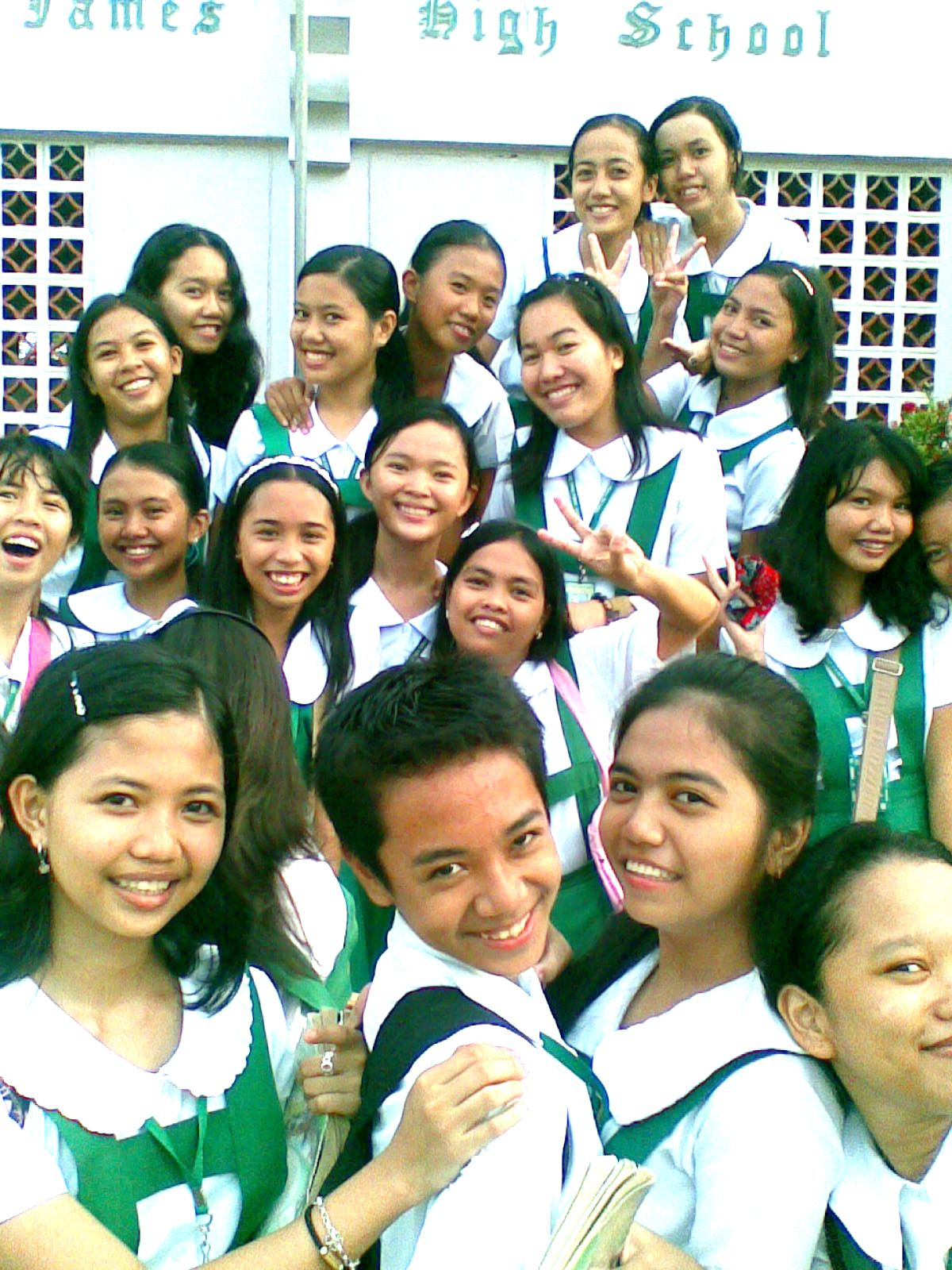
Students

Saint James High School is named after the town’s patron saint, Saint James the Great. It started as an elementary parochial school in 1939. After a couple of years in operation, war broke out and the school was temporarily closed. When the war was over, the parish school was reopened, this time to answer the town’s felt need for a secondary school. By 1947, the school opened its doors to high school students and came out with its first batch of graduates in 1950.

It was largely through the efforts of Fr. John Ruyter of the Missionary of the Sacred Heart Congregation that the primary school was founded and through the efforts of Fr. Adriano Steejer, MSC, the high school. For the first five years of its operation, the principalship was held by Mr. Jose D. Cuyos with Fr. Martin Weistende, MSC, as the director. After Mr. Cuyos, the RVM sisters managed the school with Sr. Sofia Alaan as the principal. When the sisters left after five years, the running of the day to day school activities was given to Mr. Nestorio Cloribel as the principal, with Fr. Mateo Van Santvoord, Fr. Jose Van den Berg and Fr. Andres Gysberts as still as the director and Mrs. Necita Radaza-Lim as the principal.

In 1976, the Filipinization Act was passed banning foreign nationals to run schools and businesses. Thus, in June 1976 Mrs. Necita R. Lim was appointed as the Directress by Bishop Carmelo Morelos D.D. while at the same time serving still as Principal of the school up to her retirement in 2005. In June, 2005, Bishop Juan De Dios Pueblos appointed a new Director in the person of Rev. Fr. Loven E. Tutas, the young and energetic parish priest of Buenavista and an alumnus of Saint James High School and a native o Buenavista.

In June 2006, Ms. Aida K. Kuizon was appointed by the Bishop as the new principal upon the recommendation of the new parish priest. In June 2011, Mrs Merly P. Abiva was appointed by Msgr. Bienvinido A. Betaizar the School Director, as the new school principal together with the outgoing principal Ms. Aida K. Kuizon. In June 2015, Rev Fr. Roberto T. Butawan, was appointed as the school new School Director and presently headed by the School Principal Dr. Merly P. Abiva.

From a modest building of light materials, to its present concrete one, Saint James High School has come a long way. The first floor of the Senior High School building and the second floor of the back building, which consist of 4 classrooms that will be occupied by Grade 7 students, were built in 2014. The Senior High School building was occupied in 2016 by the pioneering batch of Senior High School in accordance with newly-implemented K-to-12 Curriculum. The said Senior High School building was improved in 2017 with two additional floors and were occupied with Grade 12 students.

In 2017, the back building was modified with additional spaces for Physics, Biology, and Chemistry laboratories in the second floor and Computer and SMAW laboratories in the first floor. In 2018, speech laboratory became functional and fully operational. During the summer of 2019, a part of left-wing bleacher was realized which can occupy 25% of the maximum capacity of the gymnasium. In the year 2020, the third floor of the Senior High School building was made into a spacious and state-of-the-art library equipped with computers and internet connection to assure a better experience of learning.

== Management ==
=== Administrators ===
Name	Position	Years active
Rev. Fr. Marlon E. Lacal, O. Carm, Ph. D.	School Director	June 1, 2023–present
Mrs. Merly P. Abiva, Ph.D	School Principal	2011–present

== School seal ==
Saint James High School seal is bordered by the color green, the colors of life, signifying that education is life. Its motto “Vir Sapiens Fortis Est” means that a wise man is a strong man. This strengthens the school’s belief that man should make use of his knowledge in all aspects of life’s challenges; that strength can be derived in man’s use of his intellectual powers.

== School programs and campaigns ==
=== Alay-Bigay sa Pasko ===
St. James High School students made it a tradition to give alms and donations to the less fortunate during the season of Christmas by formulating an outreach program covering the entire Caraga region. They named it Alay-Bigay sa Pasko (Gift-giving in Christmas) and have pursued the program for 8 years now.

Each offering includes:

- Rice
- Canned foods
- Noodles
- Coffee
- Milk
- Used clothing
- Soap
- Shampoo

The outreach program has reached the remote villages and communities of southern Agusan del Sur and the towns of northern Agusan del Norte. In 2008, the program went to the Agusan del Norte Provincial Hospital where hundreds of patients received early Christmas presents.

== See also ==
- Diocese of Butuan
- Missionaries of the Sacred Heart
