= John King =

John or Johnny King may refer to:

== Academics ==
- John Edward King (1858–1939), English author and headmaster
- John E. King (1913–2008), American educator and academic administrator
- John G. King (physicist) (1925–2014), experimental physicist at MIT
- John Leslie King (born 1951), professor at the University of Michigan School of Information
- John Mark King, leader of St. James-Bond Church (1863–1883) and principal of Manitoba College in Winnipeg
- John King (1766-1846), Swiss-English surgeon and artist in Bristol, UK

== Entertainment ==
- John Crookshanks King (1806–1882), Scottish sculptor in Boston, Massachusetts
- John King (painter) (1929–2014), English painter
- John "Dusty" King (1909–1987), American actor
- John Michael King (1926–2008), American actor
- John Reed King (1914–1979), American radio and TV game show host
- John King (ukulelist) (1953–2009), American ukulele player
- John King (author) (born 1960), English author of novels such as The Football Factory
- John King (comics), a fictional character in the Marvel Comics Universe
- John King (country singer) (born 1988), country musician
- John King (music producer), American music producer, one of the Dust Brothers
- John King, lead guitarist for American rock band The Litter

== Military ==
- John King, 1st Baron Kingston (died 1676), Anglo-Irish soldier during the Wars of the Three Kingdoms
- John King (explorer) (1838–1872), Irish soldier and member of the Burke and Wills expedition in Australia
- John King (Medal of Honor) (1865–1938), U.S. Navy chief petty officer and twice recipient of the Medal of Honor
- John H. King (1820–1888), U.S. Army officer and American Civil War general

== Politics ==
=== US ===
- John King (New York congressman) (1775–1836), United States representative from New York
- John A. King (1788–1867), governor of New York, 1857–1858
- John Pendleton King (1799–1888), United States senator from Georgia
- John A. King (1817–1900), New York politician
- J. Floyd King (1842–1915), U.S. representative from Louisiana
- John Rhodes King, member of the sixth (1855) and eleventh (1866) Texas Legislatures
- John M. King, member of the 6th South Dakota State Senate in 1899
- Jack P. King (1909–1982), member of the Hawaii House of Representatives
- John W. King (1918–1996), governor of New Hampshire, 1963–1969
- John McCandish King (1927–2016), member of the Illinois House of Representatives
- John G. King (politician) (born 1942), in Massachusetts
- John King Jr. (born 1975), United States secretary of education, 2016–2017
- John Richard C. King (born 1976), South Carolina state legislature
- John King (California politician), president of the Common Council
- John King (Michigan politician), member of the Michigan House of Representatives
- John Edward King (Louisiana judge) (1821–1881), justice of the Louisiana Supreme Court for one day
- John F. King (born 1963/1964), Georgia's Insurance and Safety Fire Commissioner

=== UK ===
- John King, 2nd Baron King (1706–1740), English MP and peer
- John King (official) (1759–1830), of Aldenham House, Herts., English under-secretary of state for home affairs and MP
- John Gilbert King (1822–1901), Irish Conservative politician
- John Francis King (1926–1998), mayor of Galway, 1978–1979
- John King (MP for Gloucester), English MP for Gloucester
- Sir John King, 2nd Baronet (died 1720), Anglo-Irish politician

=== Elsewhere ===
- John Charles King (1817–1870), member of Victorian Legislative Assembly for Evelyn
- John King (Australian politician) (1820–1895), Victorian Legislative Council and Gippsland
- John Warwick King (1856–1927), Canadian member of parliament from Ontario

== Religion ==
- John King (bishop of London) (died 1621), Church of England bishop
- John King (covenanter) (died 1679), Church of Scotland minister, Scots Worthy, executed and mutilated in Edinburgh
- John King (rector of Chelsea) (1652–1732), English clergyman
- John King (master of Charterhouse) (1655–1737), English clergyman and headmaster
- John Glen King (1732–1787), English cleric and antiquarian
- John King (missionary) (1787–1854), New Zealand missionary
- John King (bishop of Portsmouth) (1880–1965), English Roman Catholic bishop
- John King (canon of Westminster) (died 1638), canon of Windsor, and of Westminster
- John King (archdeacon of Killala) (died 1818), Anglican priest in Ireland

== Sports ==
=== Cricket ===
- John King (Suffolk cricketer) (1797–1842), English cricketer
- John King (cricketer, born 1871) (1871–1946), English cricketer
- John William King (1908–1953), English cricketer and nephew of cricketer John King
- Bart King (1873–1965), American cricketer, John Barton King

=== Football and rugby ===
- Johnny King (footballer, born 1926) (1926–2010), English footballer for Leicester in the 1949 FA Cup Final
- Johnny King (footballer, born 1932) (1932–2025), English footballer for Stoke and Crewe in the 1950s and 1960s
- John King (footballer, born 1933) (1933–1982), Welsh international footballer for Swansea
- John King (footballer, born 1938) (1938–2016), English footballer for Tranmere and Port Vale
- John King (rugby league), footballer of the 1940s
- John King (Scottish footballer) (1888–1984)
- John Abbott King (1883–1916), English rugby player
- Johnny King (born 1942), Australian rugby league footballer of the 1960s and '70s
- John M. King, Mississippi College head football coach before George Bohler in 1925

=== Other sports ===
- John King (baseball) (born 1994), American baseball player
- Johnny King (boxer) (1912–1963), English boxer 1920s–1940s
- John King (long jumper) (born 1963), English long jumper
- John Paul King (born 1982), Irish hurler
- John King (racing driver) (born 1988), American stock car racing driver
- John King (fencer), Scottish fencer

== Other ==
- John King (murderer) (1974–2019), American white supremacist and one of the three perpetrators of the Murder of James Byrd Jr.
- John King (pirate) (died 1717), juvenile pirate in the crew of Samuel Bellamy
- John King (police officer) (1830–1881), police constable at the Eureka Stockade rebellion
- John King (journalist) (born 1962/1963), American journalist for CNN
  - John King, USA, American television show
- John King, Baron King of Wartnaby (1917–2005), English businessman, chairman of British Airways
- John Herbert King, British clerk and spy for the Soviet Union
- USS John King, U.S. Navy destroyer named for the Medal of Honor recipient
- John A. King House, historic house in Lake Butler, Florida

== See also ==
- Jack King (disambiguation)
- John Dashwood-King (disambiguation)
- Jon King (born 1954), English musician
- Jon King (actor), American adult film actor and model
- Jonathan King (disambiguation)
- King (surname)
- John, King of England
