= Jack King =

Jack King may refer to:

== Sports ==
- Jack King (footballer, born 1985), English footballer for Scunthorpe United
- Jack King (footballer, born 1879) (1879–1965), Australian footballer for St Kilda
- Jack King (footballer, born 1901), English footballer
- Jack King (footballer, born 1902) (1902–1988), English footballer for Oldham Athletic
- Jack King (footballer, born 1904) (1904–1979), Australian footballer for Carlton
- Jack King (footballer, born 1919) (1919–2012), Australian footballer for Hawthorn
- Jack King (footballer, born 1928) (1928–2011), Australian footballer for Footscray
- Jack King (cyclist) (1897–?), Australian Olympic cyclist
- Jack King (water polo) (1910–2000), Australian Olympic water polo player

== Other ==
- Jack King (animator) (1895–1958), director and animator for Warner Bros. and Disney
- Eric Roberts (spy) (1907–1972), MI5 agent known by the pseudonym Jack King
- Jack P. King (1909–1982), member of the Hawaii House of Representatives
- Jack King (NASA) (1931–2015), NASA's "Voice of Launch Control" during Apollo 11 and other missions
- Jack Lester King (1934–1983), American population geneticist
- Jack King (musician), drummer and founder of Frumious Bandersnatch

== See also ==
- John King (disambiguation)
- King (surname)
- Jackie King (1945–2025), South African water scientist
