= Ordóñez guns =

19th-century Spanish coastal artillery weapon

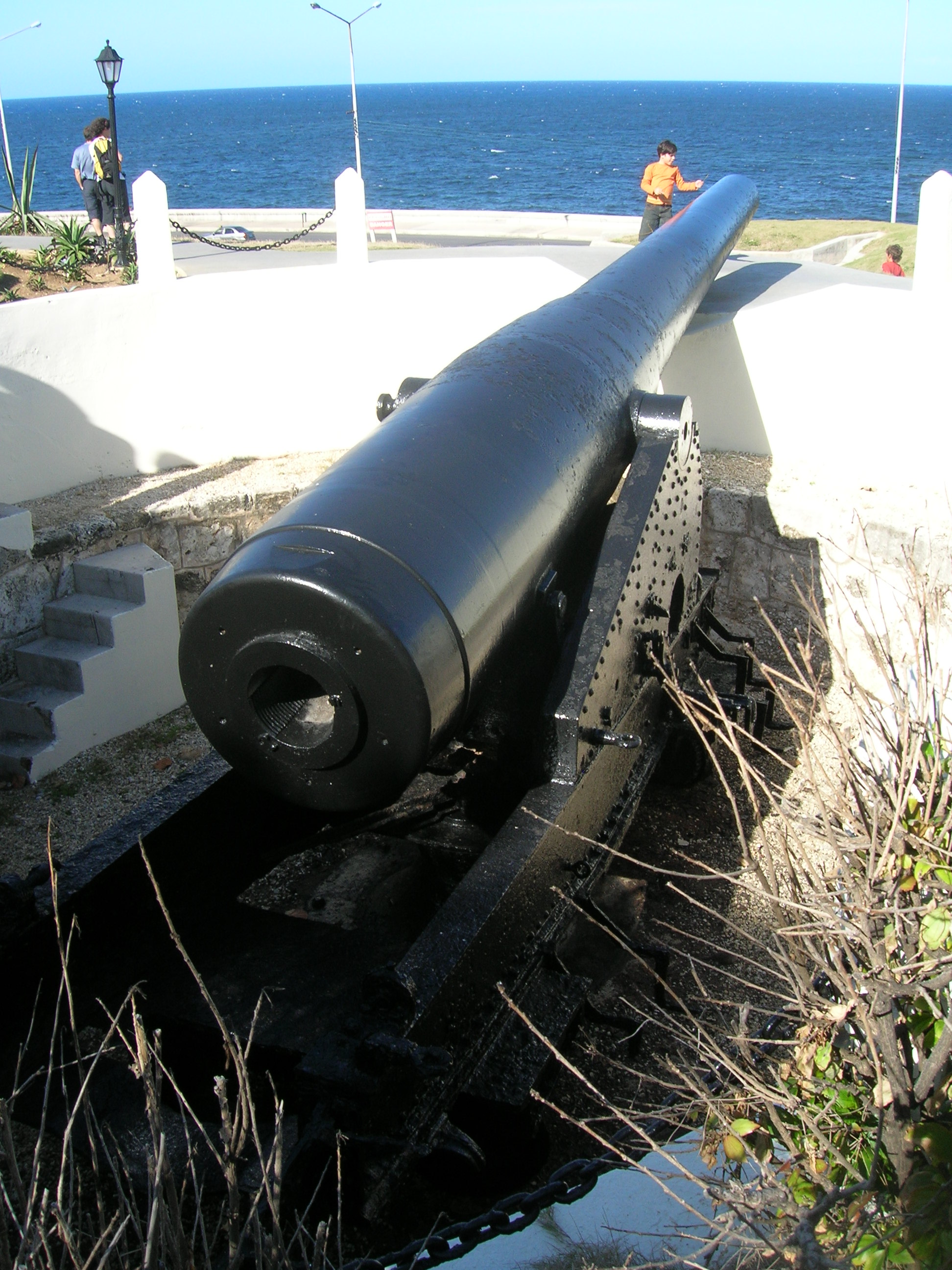
305 mm (12.0 in) Diaz-Ordóñez rifle mounted en barbette at the Santa Clara Battery, Havana

Diaz-Ordóñez guns are a type of late 19th century coastal artillery. Ranging in caliber from 150 mm (5.9 in) to 305 mm (12.0 in), most of the models were field guns, but some were howitzers. Salvador Diaz Ordóñez, an artillery officer in the Spanish Army, designed the guns, and they were made in Asturias, Spain at the Trubia Arms Factory (Fábrica de armas de Trubia). The Spanish installed them in forts and batteries at home, for instance at Ceuta, and throughout their empire, in Puerto Rico, Cuba, and the Philippines. The Ordóñez guns appear to have been used for protecting Spain's colonies; reportedly the Spanish generally reserved the higher quality, and much more expensive, Hontoria guns for the defense of Spain.

Although they have been obsolete for more than a century, a few Ordóñez guns have survived to the present as historical artifacts. There is one at Santa Clara Battery in Havana, a second, heavily damaged by the explosion of a shell, and brought from Subic Bay, at the Presidio of San Francisco, and a third at Castillo de San Cristóbal (Puerto Rico).

== Design ==
The guns were rifled breech-loading weapons with a cast iron body, hooped with wrought iron, and with a steel tube screwed in place that contained the breechblock and extended just forward of the trunnions. The Ordóñez guns captured at Havana were all 35 to 36 calibers in length.) The breechblocks were lever-actuated, and of the French or interrupted screw type, though the obturating ring followed the Krupp design. The guns appear to have been mounted en barbette, rather than on a disappearing carriage.

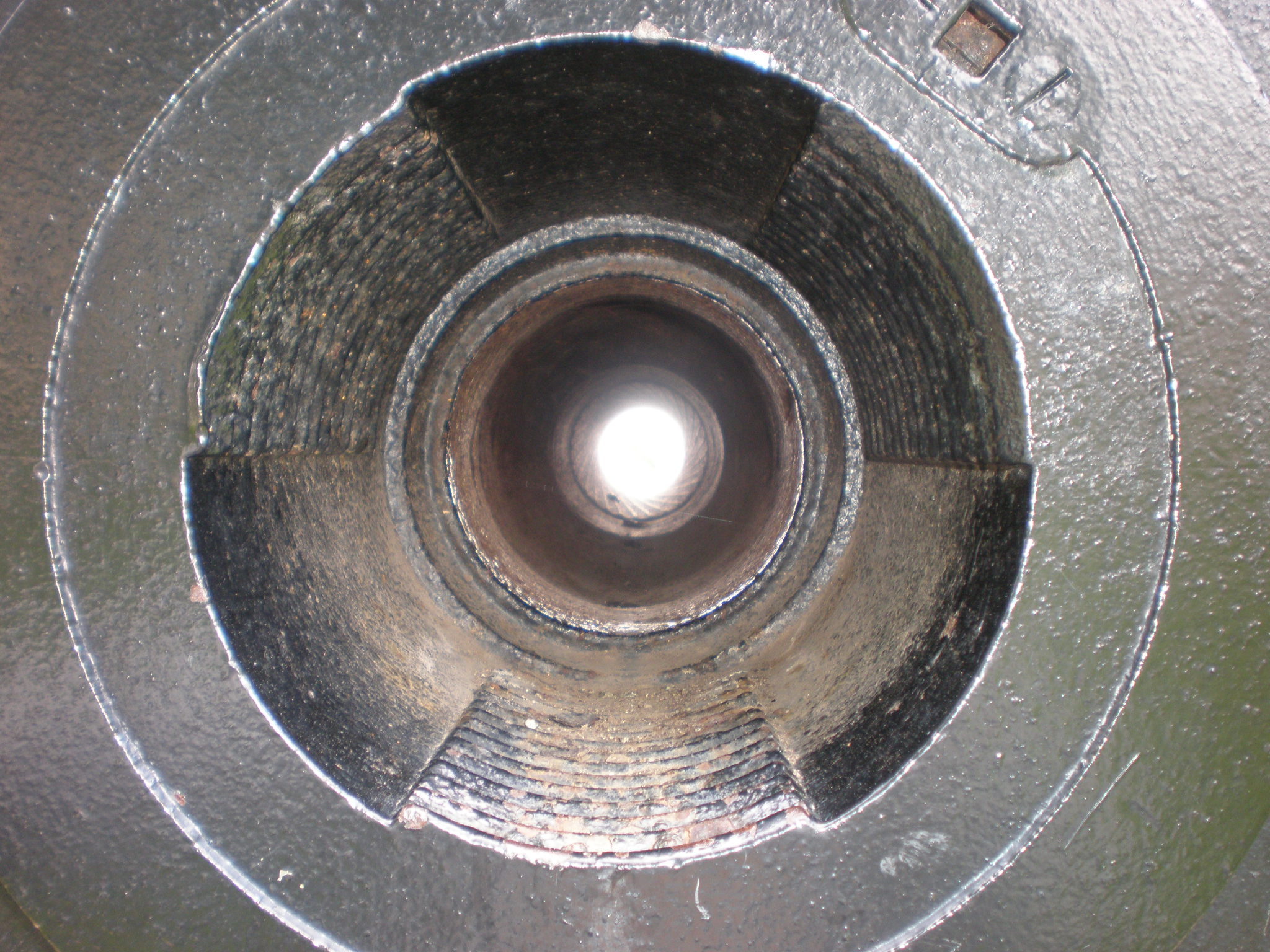
View up the barrel via its breach of a damaged Ordóñez gun at the Presidio of San Francisco

A US Naval Intelligence report from 1892 described the Ordóñez guns as being less powerful than most other modern guns of equal calibers, but also much cheaper (because they were of iron rather than entirely steel). Comparison of the 120 mm (4.7 in) Ordóñez guns captured at Havana with the US 12 in (300 mm) all-steel naval gun found that the Ordóñez guns had a longer though narrower powder chamber that held less powder. As a result, the Ordóñez guns threw a lighter shell with less velocity to a shorter range than the US 12 in (300 mm) gun.

The Americans captured guns of 150 mm (5.9 in) at Havana, Manila, and Puerto Rico, 240mm (9.45") guns at Havana and Manila, and 305 mm (12.0 in) guns at Havana. At Havana the Americans also captured Ordóñez 210 mm (8.3 in) howitzers. There may also have been 140 mm (5.5 in) and 280 mm (11 in) Ordóñez guns, though none at any place that the Americans captured. Some 120 mm (4.7 in) and 126 mm (5.0 in) of the more expensive Hontoria naval guns, landed from the cruiser Alfonso XII, were also found at Havana.

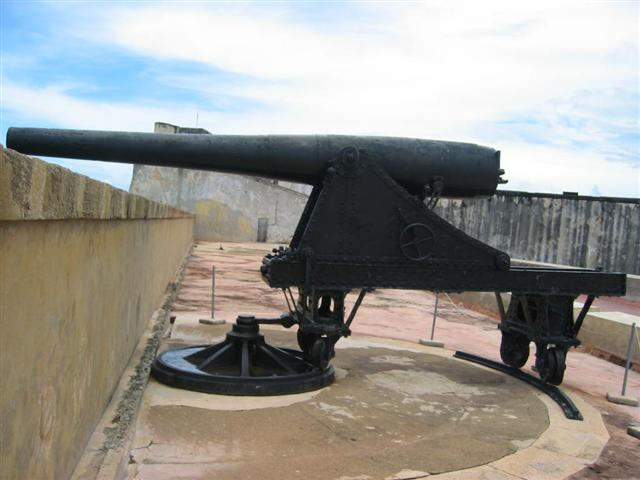
Diaz-Ordóñez gun at Castillo de San Cristóbal, Puerto Rico

Diaz-Ordóñez also designed the 1891 240 mm (9.4 in) coastal artillery breech-loading howitzer, which was 14 calibers in length. It could fire a 140 kg (310 lb) projectile to 9,000 m (30,000 ft). Some of the howitzers served in Spain, including four at a battery at Fort La Mola in Menorca, and some at Montjuïc Castle, Barcelona.

In 1896 Diaz-Ordóñez designed another 240 mm (9.4 in) howitzer, this one 16 calibers in length and consisting of a tube and two sleeves. The howitzer was made of forged and tempered steel, with a de Bange interrupted-screw breech-block with six screw sectors. The howitzer also had a hydraulic recoil mechanism. It could fire a 200 kg (440 lb) shell 11,320 m (37,140 ft). The artillery factory at Trubia produced the first exemplars in 1903, but the howitzer was not ready for adoption for active duty until 1916, by which time it was obsolescent. Still, it went into service and by 1936, M1916 240 mm (9.4 in) howitzers armed several batteries around Spain. Four were at Ferrol in the Fuente Seca Battery, four at Cartagena at the Loma Larga Battery, which were moved in 1940 to Ceuta, and four each were in the Regana and Refeubeitx batteries on Mallorca. Lastly, eight of the howitzers were held in reserve at an artillery park. In April 1937, the army moved four of these howitzers by rail to Águilas. The four remaining howitzers were sent to Madrid where three were emplaced and one was converted to a railway gun.

== In action ==
The Ordóñez guns and howitzers saw combat service at Havana, Manila, and San Juan during the Spanish–American War, and at Subic Bay during the Philippine–American War.

On 7 May 1898, the Spanish lured the USS Vicksburg and the US Coast Guard cutter Morrill into chasing a Spanish schooner under the guns of the Santa Clara Battery at Vedado, Havana, Cuba. The battery, which was armed with two Ordóñez guns, amongst others, fired too soon on the US vessels, which were able to escape without taking a hit.

On 10 May 1898, Captain Ángel Rivero Méndez ordered Castillo San Cristóbal's guns to fire on the USS Yale; the guns fired two poorly aimed shots, both of which fell far short. These shots marked Puerto Rico's entry into the war. On 12 May the US Navy warships conducted a day-long bombardment of San Juan. The U.S. Navy had more and larger guns than the Spanish. The battleships, cruisers, and monitors carried four 13 in (330 mm), four 12 in (300 mm), eight 10 in (250 mm), twelve 8 in (200 mm)", and four 6 in (150 mm)" guns, in addition to many smaller pieces. Fort San Cristobal had two 150 mm (5.9") Ordóñez guns and two 240 mm (9.4 in) Ordóñez howitzers, Castillo San Felipe del Morro, which apparently fired the first shot, had five 150 mm (5.9 in) Ordóñez guns and two 240 mm (9.4 in) two Ordóñez howitzers, the San Antonio battery had four 150 mm (5.9 in) Ordóñez guns, the San Fernando Battery had four muzzleloading 210 mm (8.3 in) sunchado (or zunchado, meaning wrapped or banded) howitzers, the Santa Elena battery had three more, the San Agustin battery had three almost as obsolete 150 mm (5.9 in) sunchado guns, and the Santa Teresa battery had three 150 mm (5.9 in) Ordóñez guns. The Navy fired 1,362 shells whereas the Spanish fired only 441 rounds. Even so, military casualties were very light on both sides; civilian deaths exceeded combined military deaths by one.

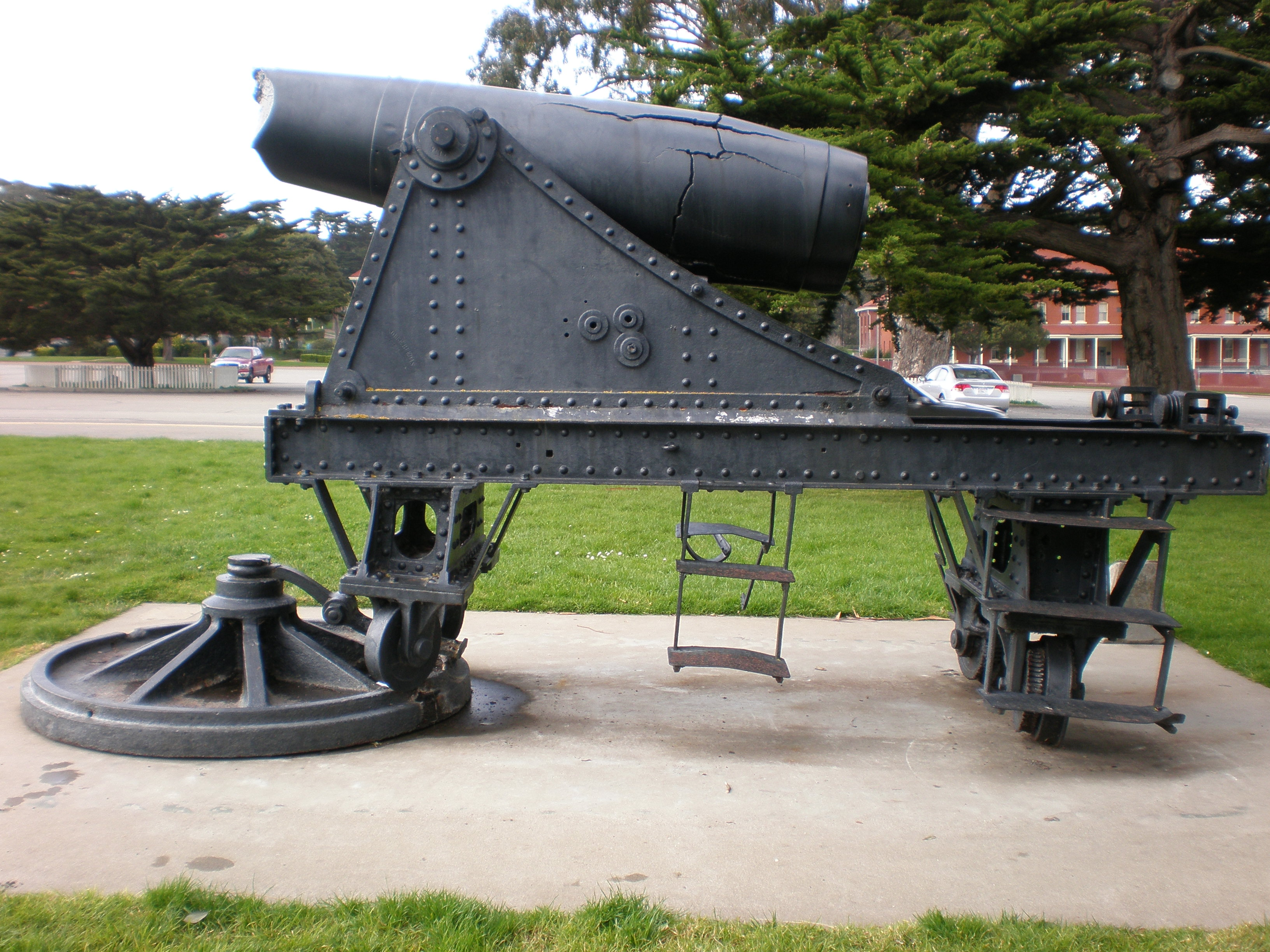
Side view of the Ordoñez gun at the Presidio of San Francisco

Two 150 mm (5.9 in) Ordóñez guns were in place in a battery at Sangley Point, which the USS Olympia, USS Baltimore, and USS Boston shelled during the Battle of Manila Bay. Four more of these 150 mm (5.9 in) guns were to be mounted at a battery at Subic Bay but had not yet been at the time of the battle. Filipino freedom fighters resisting the US colonization of the Philippines later moved one of these to a battery they constructed there.

In September 1899, US forces attacked the battery at Subic Bay, where shells from the USS Charleston knocked the Ordóñez gun in the battery out of action. William Randolph Hearst acquired this gun and presented it to the City of San Francisco where it was on display at Columbia Square Park until 1973, when it was moved to the Main Post of the Presidio of San Francisco.

Possibly the last action for any Ordóñez piece occurred in 1937 when two of the M1916 305 mm (12.0 in) howitzers at Madrid participated on the Republican side at the Battle of Brunete during the Spanish Civil War. The Nationalists did deploy an armored train with "a huge railway gun", at the Battle of Teruel, but it is not clear whether the gun in question was the Ordóñez M1916.
