= Bombardment of San Juan =

Engagement between US Navy warships and Spanish in Puerto Rico

Coordinates: 18.4064°N 66.0639°W

- Part of the Spanish–American War
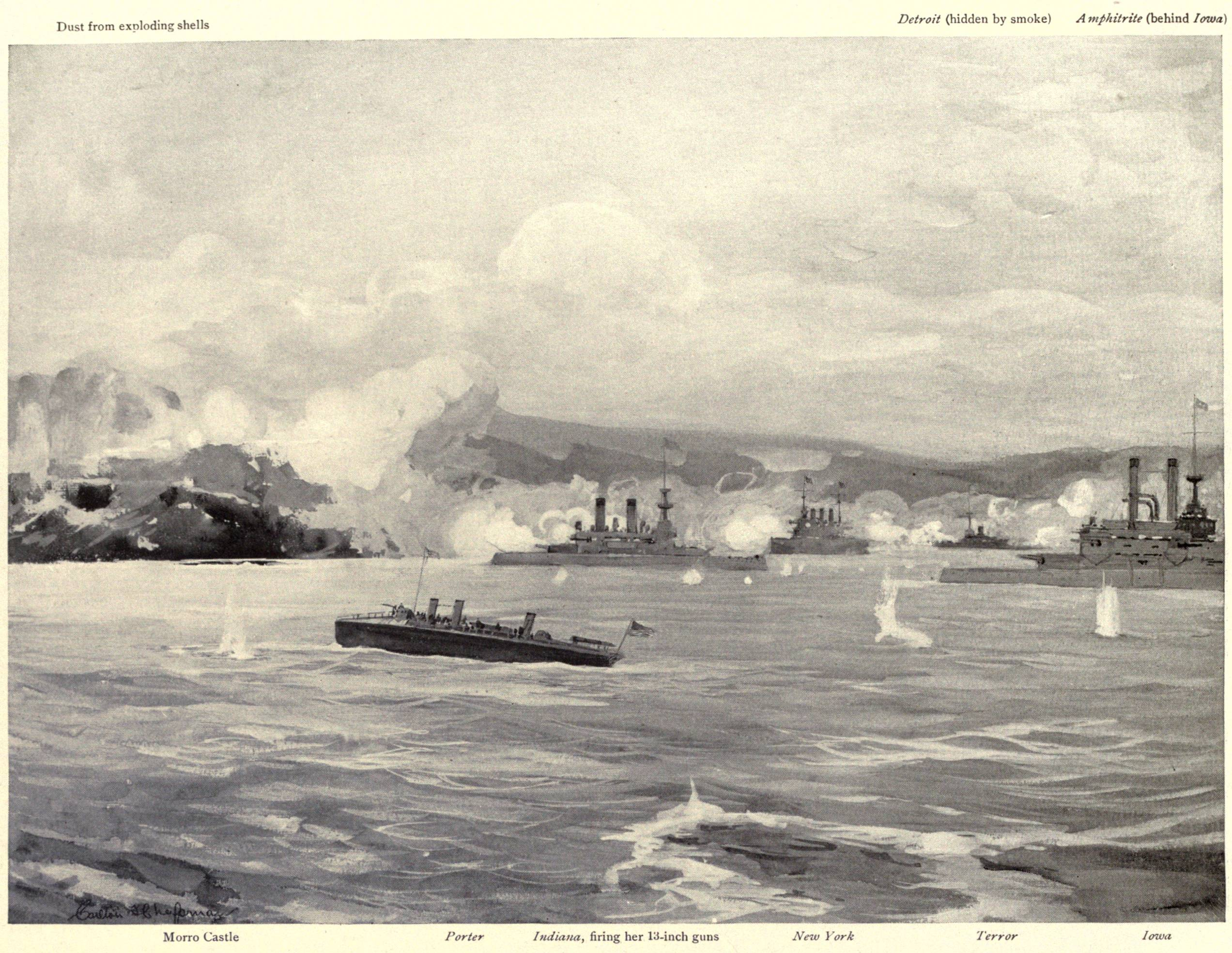
- American warships engaging the forts at San Juan.
Date	12 May 1898 – 18 May 1898
Location	San Juan Bay, San Juan, Puerto Rico,
Result	Spanish Victory.

Belligerents
Spain	United States

Commanders and leaders
Manuel Macías y Casado	William T. Sampson

Strength
Land: 2,500 infantry 29 artillery pieces 1 castle 2 forts 1 shore battery Sea: 2 gunboats	2 battleships 1 armoured cruiser 2 unprotected cruisers 1 auxiliary cruiser 2 monitors 1 torpedo boat 1 collier 2 yachts

Casualties and losses
2 killed 38 wounded 1 castle damaged 2 forts damaged 1 shore battery damaged	2 killed 7 wounded 1 battleship damaged 1 cruiser damaged
- 5 civilians killed 18 civilians wounded
- The French cruiser Amiral Rigault de Genouilly was slightly damaged by American gunfire during the battle.

The Bombardment of San Juan, or the First Battle of San Juan, on 12 May 1898 was an engagement between United States Navy warships and the Spanish fortifications of San Juan, Puerto Rico. It was the first major action of the Puerto Rican Campaign during the Spanish–American War.

== Background ==
Under the command of Rear Admiral William T. Sampson, a U.S. fleet—consisting of the flagship armored cruiser USS New York, battleships USS Iowa and Indiana, the unprotected cruisers USS Montgomery and Detroit, the monitors USS Amphitrite and Terror, the torpedo boat USS Porter, the auxiliary cruiser USS Wompatuck, the collier USS Niagara, and two unarmed yachts transporting officials and the press,—prepared to attack Puerto Rico.

Their mission was to intercept the Spanish Admiral Pascual Cervera y Topete and his fleet steaming from the Cape Verde Islands to the Antilles. American commanders believed the Spanish fleet was steaming for Puerto Rico. With this understanding, Sampson set steam from Key West and lifted anchor at about noon on 2 May, for the Spanish province. The Fleet reached Cape Haitien, Haiti, on 8 May, where Rear Admiral Sampson telegraphed Washington to report updates and await for further instructions. Sampson intended to destroy the Spanish squadron and then move on to attack San Juan's castles, forts and batteries.

On 8 May, in San Juan Bay, the USS Yale captured the Spanish cargo ship Rita. The Americans installed a prize crew and sent the cargo vessel to Charleston, South Carolina. The following day, a Spanish auxiliary cruiser, name unknown, and Yale fought a minor battle off San Juan. The Spanish auxiliary cruiser was much better armed, which led to Yale, fleeing shortly after the commencement of the engagement. The next day, on May 10, Yale returned to San Juan Bay and briefly exchanged fire with Fort San Cristobal, with little effect.

Finally on 11 May, a day away from Puerto Rico and after receiving no new information about the Spanish fleet, William Sampson boarded Detroit and issued his orders. Detroit was to lead the U.S. battle line up San Juan's bay, their orders where to initiate a bombardment of the enemy positions if fired upon. Sampson also transferred his flag to Iowa.

== Bombardment ==
The next morning at 05:00, Detroit proceeded with leading the American battle line. Steaming far up into the bay, initially no Spanish shots were fired on the approaching U.S. fleet. Which allowed the American ships to reach the tip of the bay in full view of San Juan's harbor. Commander Sampson, feeling his warships were steaming too close to the enemy held city, ordered his ships to stop. Despite these orders, Detroit steamed forward, which prompted the other U.S. ships to follow.

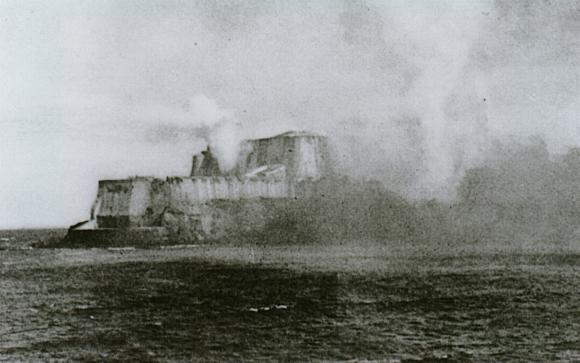
Castillo San Felipe del Morro during the battle.

After failing to stop his vessels, Sampson ordered Iowa to train her guns on the nearest enemy stronghold, the Morro castle. This was only a ruse though; Iowa fired one shot into the water and the Spanish, believing they had been fired on, returned a salvo from their battery which failed to score a direct hit. Iowa fired again with a massive broadside which reportedly blew away a large portion of the castle.

Rough seas and high winds meant that both American and Spanish rounds were being blown off target, which resulted in a severe disadvantage for the American and Spanish gunners. Several shots ended up falling on San Juan houses and other buildings. The rough seas made the U.S. ships wobble back and forth, disallowing the sailors a steady platform to fire from, this also attributed to stray rounds. At least one shell struck the 16th-century San José Church.

All the damaged civilian structures were adjacent to Morro castle, which meant that any round failing to hit the castle would most likely hit the town accidentally. The U.S. warships maneuvered in circular motions, firing from both their port and starboard guns. Once Morro seemed to be considerably damaged, Sampson ordered his fleet to begin bombarding Fort San Cristóbal, the Spanish Ballaja Barracks, a small 3.4-acre (14,000 m^{2}) sea fort, El Cañuelo, which appears from Spanish records to have been unarmed and unoccupied, and a battery known as San Carlos.

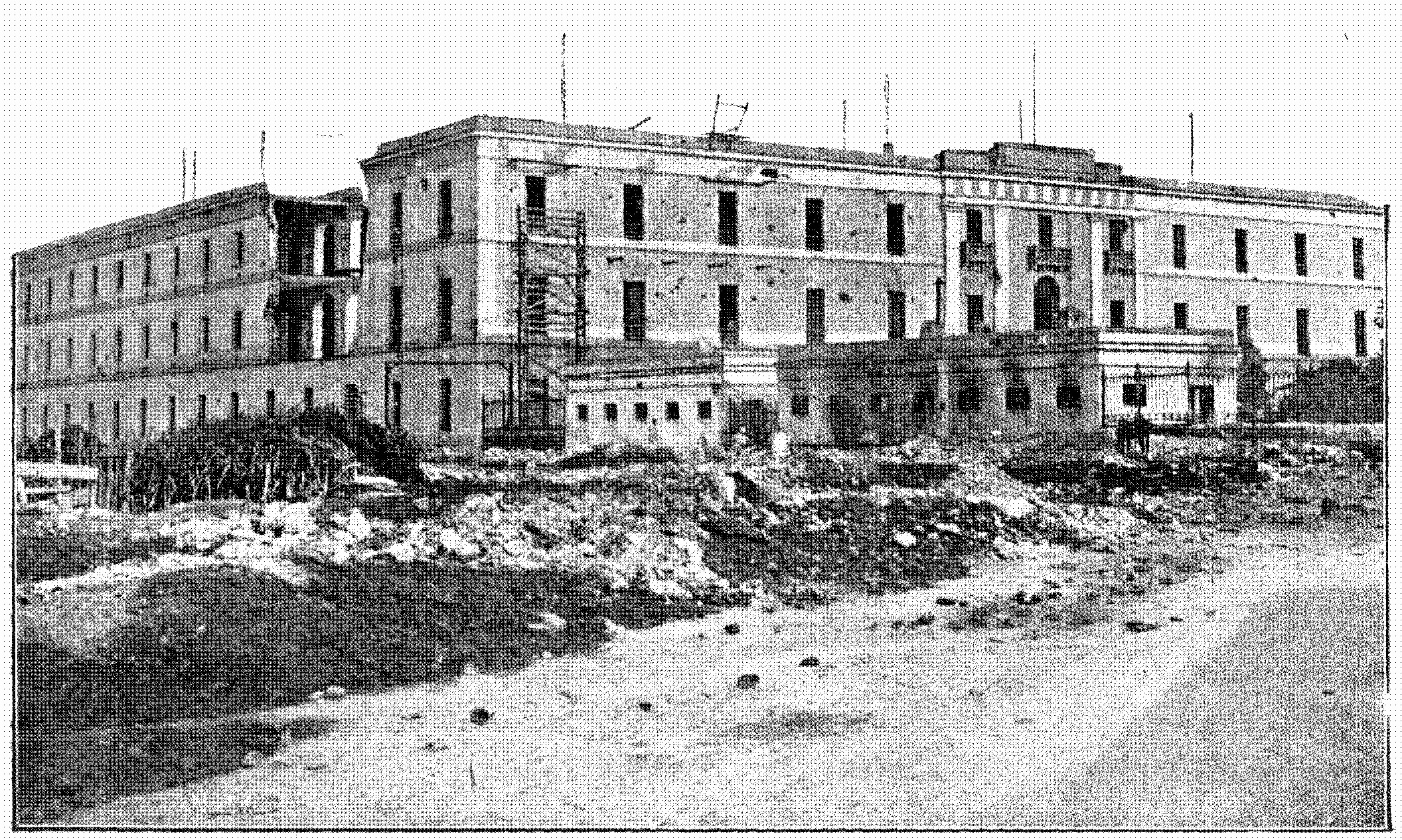
The battle damage inflicted on Ballaja barracks.

The American ships were reported to be so close to the Spanish positions that their infantry were in able range to fire on the U.S. warships. However, none of their small arms were capable of inflicting serious damage on the modern steel vessels. A French cruiser—the Amiral Rigault de Genouilly—sat in San Juan's harbor, along with three small Spanish gunboats. Two of the gunboats were most likely the General Concha and Ponce de Leon. Possibly to avoid an international crisis with France, no major American attack was made on the Spanish gunboats as they were quite close to Amiral Rigault de Genouilly.

Still, a few shots that did go in that direction damaged to the French cruiser's smoke stack and rigging. Apparently neither the French nor Spanish ships responded returned fire towards the Americans. From 05:00–08:00, Sampson's fleet fired their guns, while receiving light damage on only two ships, New York and Iowa.

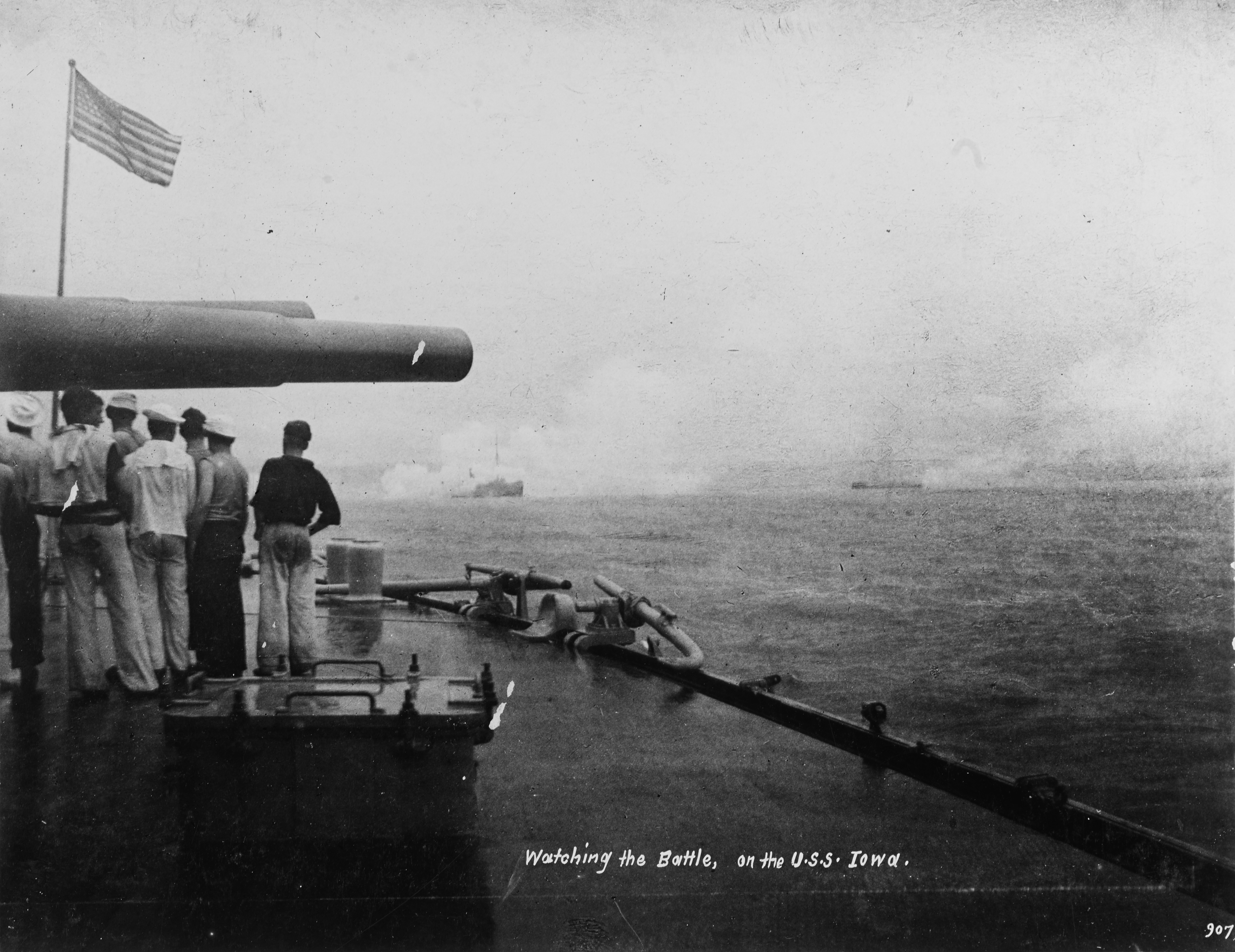
USS Iowa, firing her guns.

At 08:00, Sampson instructed his ships to cease firing due to the lack of Spanish return fire. The crew of the monitor Terror failed to understand these orders and they continued the bombardment solo until 08:30.

== Casualties ==
The only U.S. sailor killed in action served aboard the New York with four injured; three others were slightly wounded aboard Iowa. Amphitrite suffered one gunner's mate killed of heat exposure while occupying one of the barbettes. After the battle, the commanding Spanish Military Governor, Manuel Macías y Casado, confirmed that two of his troops were killed while manning the few different batteries and another 34 injured. Civilian casualties were five killed and 18 wounded. Most of the Puerto Rican civilians had fled their city at the sound of the first salvo. The number of refugees was reportedly so large that San Juan's streets were almost deserted, with the exception of the several hundred strong Spanish garrison.

== Armament ==
The U.S. Navy had more and larger guns than the Spanish. The battleships, cruisers and monitors carried four 13", four 12", eight 10", twelve 8", and four 6" guns, in addition to many smaller pieces. Fort San Cristobal had two 150mm (5.9") Ordóñez guns and two 240mm (9.45") Ordóñez howitzers, Castillo San Felipe del Morro, which apparently fired the first shot, had five 150mm Ordóñez guns and two 240mm Ordóñez howitzers, the San Antonio battery had four 150mm Ordóñez guns, the San Fernando Battery had four muzzleloading 210mm (8.3") sunchado (or zunchado, meaning banded), howitzers, the Santa Elena battery had three more, the San Agustin battery had three almost as obsolete 150mm sunchado guns, and the Santa Teresa battery had three 150mm Ordóñez guns. The Navy fired 1,362 shells whereas the Spanish fired only 441 rounds.

== Aftermath ==
The U.S. fleet steamed, or sailed in some cases, back to the Havana, Cuba, blockade. On May 18, Sampson learned that Admiral Cervera's force had sailed to Santiago de Cuba.

== See also ==
- Puerto Rican Campaign
