= Jonathan King (disambiguation) =

Jonathan King (born 1944) is an English musician, music entrepreneur, and former TV and radio presenter.

Jonathan King may also refer to:

- Jonathan King (historian) (born 1942), Australian military historian
- Jonathan King (film director) (born 1967), film director from New Zealand
- Jonathan King (politician), American politician
- Jonathan King (soccer) (born 1993), South African footballer
- Jon King (born 1954), English musician

== See also ==
- Jonathan Kings, Administrator of Tokelau in 2011–15
- John King (disambiguation)
