= Santa Clara Battery =

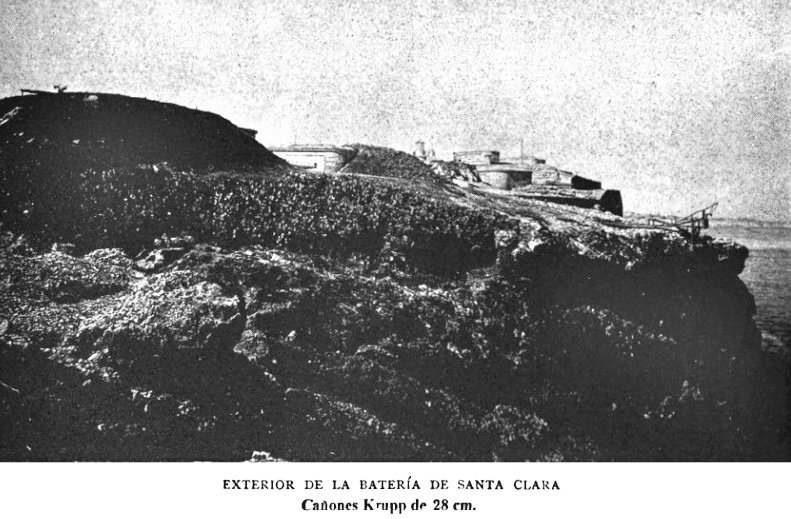
Santa Clara Battery, Havana, Cuba.

The Santa Clara Battery, with its two remaining coastal guns, one a caliber 305mm (12") Ordóñez HSE Modelo 1892 rifle and the other a 280mm (11") Krupp, stands on the grounds of the Hotel Nacional de Cuba, in Vedado, Havana. There is a small museum featuring the 1962 Cuban Missile Crisis in the battery. During the crisis, Fidel Castro and Che Guevara set up their headquarters there to prepare the defense of Havana from aerial attack. The museum is in tunnels there known as the Cueva Taganana (Taganana Cave), for the hill on which the battery stands.

== Overview ==
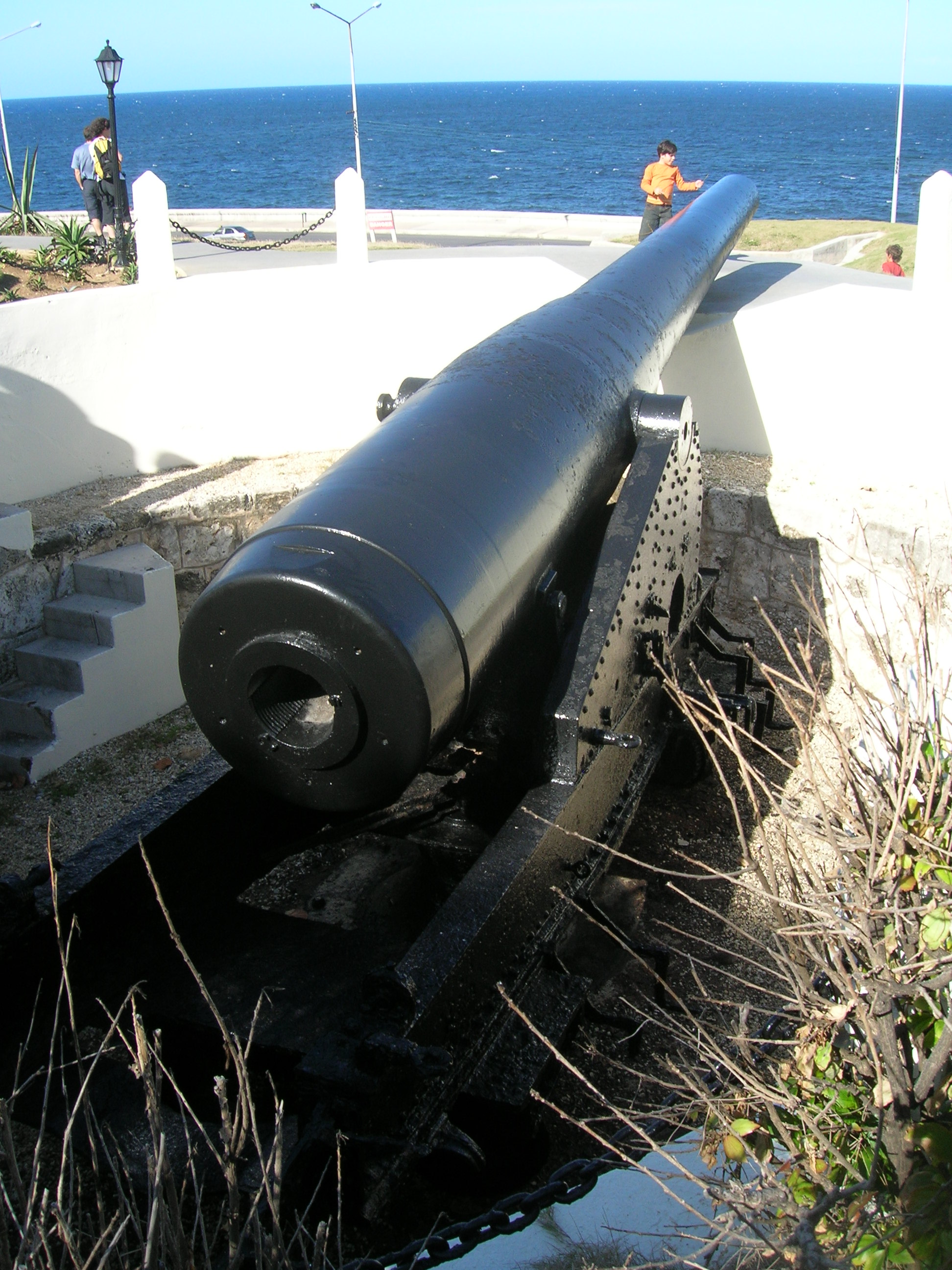
305mm (12") Ordóñez rifle at the Santa Clara Battery, Havana

The first battery on this site was built between 1797 and 1799, and was named for Juan Procopio Bassecourt y Bryas, Count of Santa Clara, the Spanish governor of Cuba from 1796 to 1799. The battery was modernized in 1895, when it received new guns. It was armed with three 11" Krupp and two 12" Ordóñez guns, as well as two Nordenfelt 6-pounder quick firing guns for close-in defense. There were also some leftover older, obsolete pieces, including eight 8" howitzers, which may have been 210mm (8.3") sunchado howitzers.

On 7 May 1898, during the Spanish–American War, the Spanish lured the USS Vicksburg and the US Revenue Cutter Morrill into chasing a Spanish schooner under the guns of the battery. The battery fired too soon on the US vessels, which were able to escape without taking a hit. Then on 13 June the Krupp gun fired on the protected (armored) cruiser USS Montgomery at a range of 9000 meters, also without effect.

Following the Spanish–American War, US troops were billeted there and later a barracks was constructed, which was torn down in 1928 or 1929 to provide a site for the hotel.

== Gallery ==
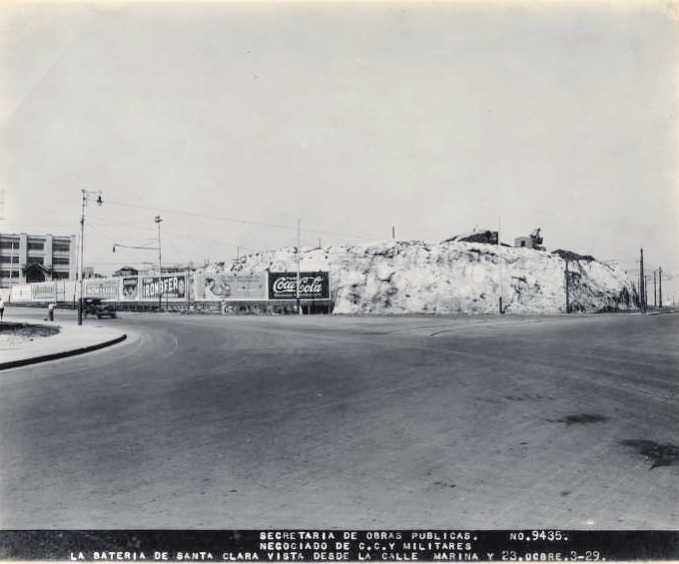
View of Battery of Santa Clara

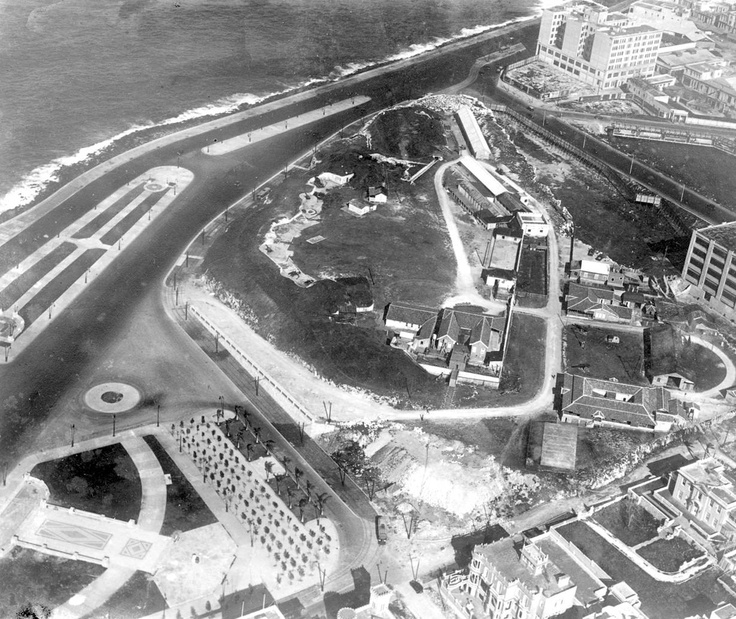
Battery of Santa Clara

== See also ==
- Batería de la de la Reina
