= John Dashwood-King =

John Dashwood-King may refer to:

- Sir John Dashwood-King, 3rd Baronet (1716–1793), English landowner
- Sir John Dashwood-King, 4th Baronet (1765–1849), English MP and landowner, son of the above

== See also ==
- John King (disambiguation)
