= John King (Medal of Honor) =

Irish sailor in the United States Navy

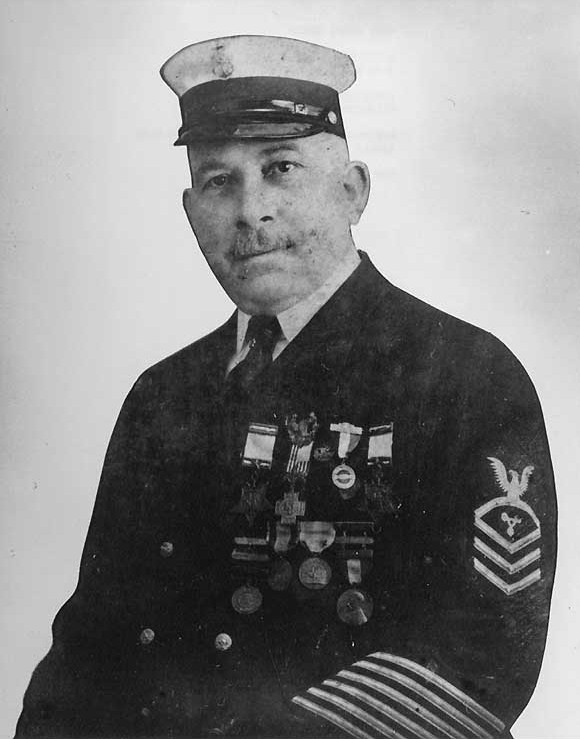
- Born: 7 February 1865; Ballinrobe, Ireland
- Died: 20 May 1938 (aged 73)
- Burial place: Hot Springs, Arkansas
- Military career
- Allegiance: United States of America
- Branch: United States Navy
- Service years: 1893–1916, fl. 1917-1919
- Rank: Chief Watertender
- Units: USS Vicksburg (PG-11); USS Salem (CL-3)
- Conflicts: Spanish–American War; Philippine–American War; World War I
- Awards: Medal of Honor (2)

John King (7 February 1862 – 20 May 1938) was an Irish sailor in the United States Navy and one of only 19 in history to receive the Medal of Honor twice.

His tombstone shows DOB in 1862.

== Biography ==
Born in the village of Currabee, near Ballinrobe (then in County Galway, now County Mayo), Ireland, King was allegedly involved in an incident at Cornmarket Ballinrobe, a result of which he was being sought by the R.I.C. (Royal Irish Constabulary). He walked 18 miles to Tuam County Galway and took the train, rather than going from Ballinrobe railway station, eventually arriving in then Queenstown, now Cobh County Cork. He then worked for his passage to the USA. King later enlisted in the Navy as a coal passer in Vermont on 20 July 1893. He served on board USS Massachusetts in the Caribbean during the Spanish–American War, and, in 1900, was transferred to USS Vicksburg for service during the Philippine–American War.

King received his first Medal of Honor while serving on the Vicksburg "for extraordinary heroism in the line of his profession at the time of the accident to the boilers... May 29, 1901." Eight years later, while a watertender on the USS Salem, King received a second Medal of Honor during another boiler explosion on 13 September 1909. Advanced to chief watertender on 1 October 1909, he continued to serve at sea until discharged in 1916.

The beginning of World War I, however, brought Chief King back on active duty; he served in New York until 20 August 1919.

He lived in retirement until his death on 20 May 1938.

He is buried in the Calvary Cemetery in Hot Springs, Arkansas.

== Legacy ==
In January 1960 a US navy destroyer was launched and named USS John King (DDG-3). It paid a visit to Dublin, Ireland in December 1961 under the command of Commander Albert.M. Sackett, who subsequently unveiled a plaque in remembrance of John King at Ballinrobe, County Mayo, Ireland. Members of the Burke and Flannery families, living relatives of John King attended. Some members of the Burke and Flannery families from Ballinrobe were hosted on board the John King at Dublin.

On 4 September 2010, a statue of King was unveiled in Ballinrobe by Irish Minister of Defense Tony Killeen. Present at the ceremony was a relative, Ann Reid, whose father was King's nephew. She remarked, "My dad used to talk about him all the time. On his visits to Ballinrobe from America, he would throw sweets and coins to the children of the town."

Michael Burke, Dun Laoghaire County Dublin and originally from Cavan Ballinrobe County Mayo, a living relative, spoke at the unveiling and recalled some of the times he as a young man met and ran errands for John King.

Pupils from Ballinrobe NS added a touch of naval flavour to the occasion by accompanying a float the Ballinrobe Scout group constructed of the destroyer USS John King to the ceremony, towed into the arena by a vintage tractor. Former crew members of the USS John King representing the USS John King association, participated in the ceremony and a unit of the U.S. Navy Band from Naples, Italy were also present.

== Awards ==
- Medal of Honor (2 awards)
- Sampson Medal
- Spanish Campaign Medal
- Philippine Campaign Medal
- World War I Victory Medal

== Medal of Honor citations ==
=== 1st Medal of Honor ===
Rank and organization: Watertender, U.S. Navy. Born: 7 February 1865, Ireland. Accredited to: New York. G.O. No.: 72, 6 December 1901. Second award.

Citation:

On board the U.S.S. Vicksburg, for heroism in the line of his profession at the time of the accident to the boilers, 29 May 1901.

=== 2nd Medal of Honor ===
G.O. No.: 40, 19 October 1909.

Citation:

Watertender, serving on board the U.S.S. Salem, for extraordinary heroism in the line of his profession on the occasion of the accident to one of the boilers of that vessel, 13 September 1909.

== See also ==
- List of Medal of Honor recipients
- List of Medal of Honor recipients during Peacetime
