= USRC Morrill =

Ship of the U.S. Revenue Cutter Service and Navy

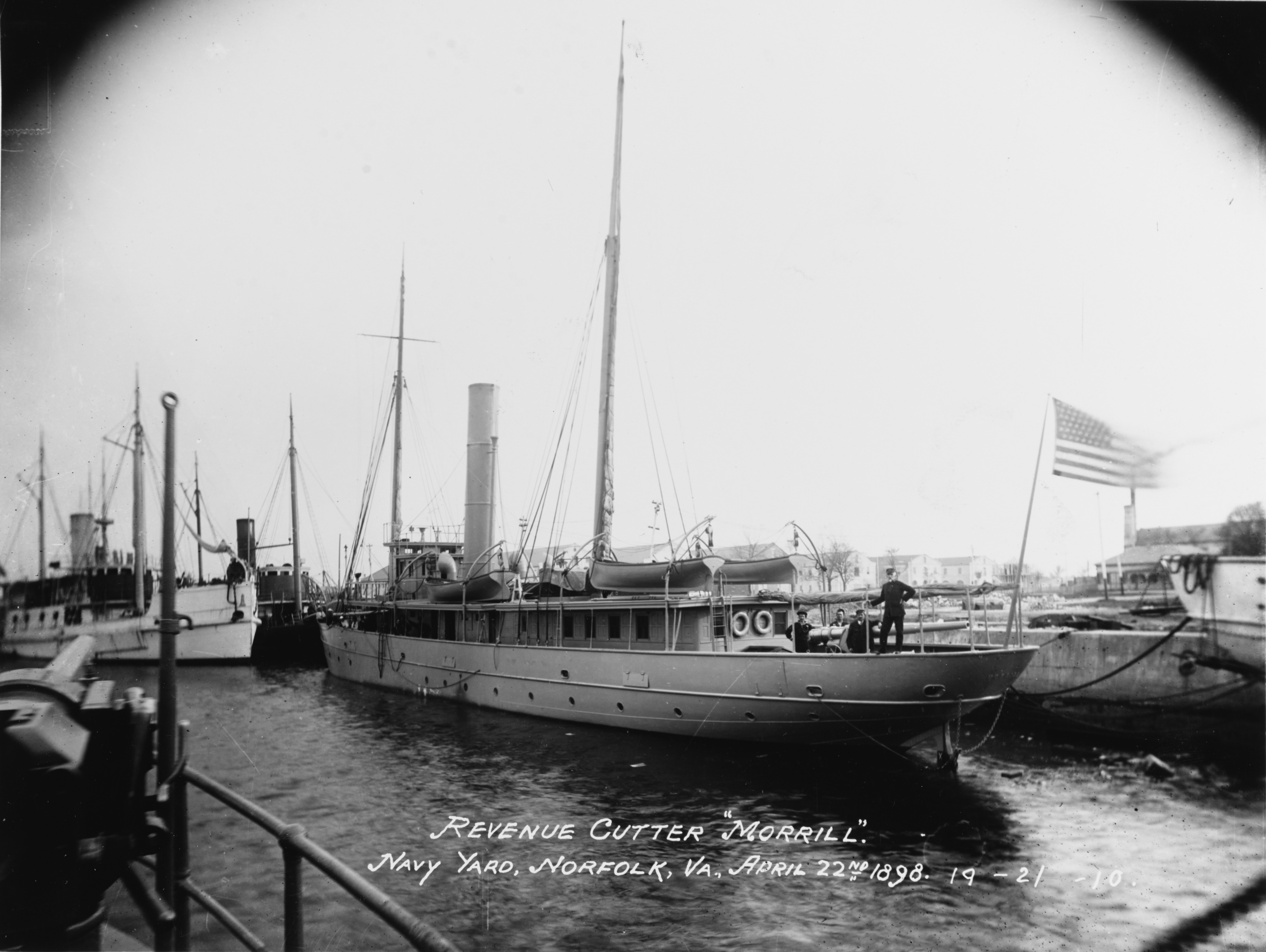
- Morrill at the Norfolk Navy Yard, Portsmouth, Virginia, 22 April 1898

History

United States
- Name: USRC Morrill
- Namesake: Lot M. Morrill
- Builder: Pusey and Jones, Wilmington, Delaware
- Commissioned: October 1889

General characteristics
- Displacement: 420 tons
- Length: 145 ft 3 in (44.3 m)
- Beam: 24 ft 0 in (7.3 m)
- Draft: 9 ft 6 in (2.9 m)
- Complement: 30
- Armament: 2 × 3-pounder guns

The United States Revenue Cutter Morrill was built at Wilmington, Delaware, and commissioned in October 1889 under the official name Lot M. Morrill. She served off Florida and in the Spanish–American War. She then served on the Great Lakes. After the United States entered into World War I in 1917, she came under the operational control of the United States Navy. She rendered particular assistance in the aftermath of the December 1917 Halifax Explosion. Following the war Morrill again served on the Great Lakes. She was decommissioned in October 1928.

== Career ==
Morrill initially operated off the southeastern coast of the United States. During 1895-98, Morrill joined a number of other Revenue Cutters in enforcing neutrality laws in the Florida Straits during the Cuban insurrection. "The enforcement of neutrality laws," said Revenue Cutter Service Commandant Capt. Charles F. Shoemaker, "made necessary by many attempts to send illegal expeditions from our coast to Cuba in the interests of the insurgents, has compelled vigilant cruising by the Cutter Service." The cutters seized seven ships for violating neutrality regulations, detained a dozen suspected violators in port, and broke up two organized filibustering expeditions before the destruction of the USS Maine on 5 February 1898.

After the outbreak of the Spanish–American War, an executive order dated 9 April 1898 transferred Morrill to the Navy Department. She then participated in blockading Cuba. This led, on 7 May 1898, to the Santa Clara Battery at Havana firing on Morrill, but without effect.

After the war, Morrill returned to the control of the Treasury Department and resumed patrol duty. She was based at Detroit and served on the Great Lakes. In December 1910 Ellsworth P. Bertholf, later fourth Captain-Commandant of the United States Revenue Cutter Service, assumed command of Morrill at Detroit.

When the United States entered World War I, the US Navy took operational control of the Revenue Service and Morrill came under Navy control. She then transferred to the Atlantic, where she patrolled from 6 April 1917 until 28 August. Several times she assisted merchant vessels that had grounded in her patrol area.

In early November the Navy ordered Morrill, then under the command of Lieutenant George E. Wilcox, to duty in Philadelphia with the 4th Naval District. She departed Detroit 10 November, and after a call at Quebec, she arrived Halifax the afternoon of 5 December. Dockside berthing was not available, and Morrill was directed to anchor near Dartmouth Cove to take on fuel and water.

Just after 0800, on 6 December, the old French Line freighter SS Mont-Blanc, carrying a full cargo of bulk explosives, collided with the Norwegian steamship SS Imo in the Narrows of Halifax Harbor. Mont-Blanc caught fire and exploded at 0905 in a blast that leveled the Richmond District in the North End of the city.

The most reliable casualty figures list 1,635 persons killed and 9,000 injured in the tragedy. Sixteen hundred buildings were totally destroyed, and nearly 12,000 more within an area of 16 miles severely damaged. Property damage was estimated at $35 million.

Morrill, not seriously damaged, turned her attention to the needs ashore. A rescue and assistance party under Second Lieutenant H. G. Hemingway rendered valuable aid on shore while the cutter stood by to tow other craft from the danger zone.

Morrill departed Halifax 18 December. Her services had come to the attention of Sir Cecil Spring Rice, the British Ambassador to the United States. In a letter dated 9 January 1918, Josephus Daniels, Secretary of the Navy, noted that Morrill, "though considerably damaged by the violent explosion of munitions on another ship, was the first to render assistance to the distressed inhabitants of the stricken city."

After Morrill arrived at the 4th Naval District, she conducted coastal patrols for the duration of the war.

Following World War I Morrill again served on the Great Lakes, where she was reassigned on 28 August 1919.

== Fate ==
After 9 years of service out of Detroit, Morrill steamed to Boston, where she was decommissioned on 19 October 1928.
