= Juan Procopio Bassecourt =

Spanish army officer and administrator (1740–1820)

Juan Procopio de Bassecourt y Bryas (22 April 1740 – 12 April 1820), 2nd Count of Santa Clara (Kingdom of Naples), was a Captain General of Cuba (1796–1799) and Captain General of Catalonia (1803–1807).

While he was Captain General of Cuba he was responsible for the construction or improvement of numerous fortifications in Havana, including the Santa Clara Battery.

== Personal life and family ==
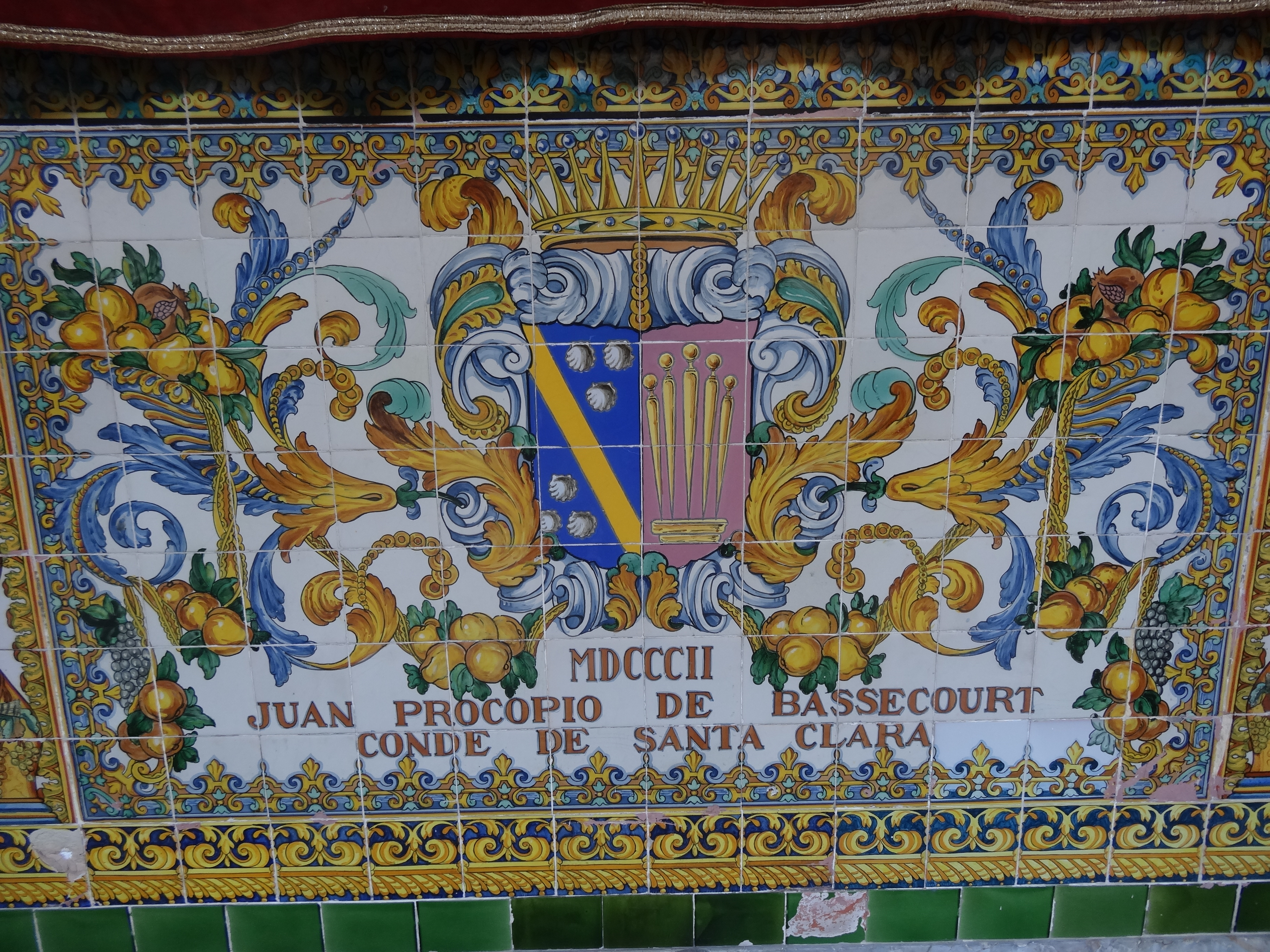
Coat of arms of Juan Procopio de Bassecourt (decorated tiles at the Capitania General de Barcelona)

Juan Procopio de Bassecourt y Bryas was born the son of Field Marshal Procopio de Bassecourt y Thieulaine, Marquis of Bassecourt, 1st Count of Santa Clara (a noble title granted in 1748 by King Fernando VI of Spain, the family having served imperial Spain since at least the middle of the 16th century), Baron of Maials, and Governor of Montjuic in Barcelona.

His mother was Catalina Inés de Bryas y Ulloa.

He was the nephew of Maria Catalina de Bassecourt, who married the Palermo-born Spanish military officer Juan González-Valor, Marquis of González from 1736, a title awarded by Charles VII of Naples and Sicily, King of Naples and Sicily (1716–1736), later King Charles III of Spain (1759–1788).

In 1761, he married Maria Teresa de Sentmenat y Copons, a niece of the Marquis of Sentmenat and Marquis of Castelldefels and granddaughter of Manuel de Oms y de Santa Pau, Spain's ambassador to the court of Louis XIV from 1698, and the Viceroy of Peru. The couple had no offspring.

His nephew, Luis Alejandro Bassecourt, served under him at Gerona and in Cuba.

== Early career ==
Having enlisted in the Walloon Guards Infantry Regiment of the Royal Guard, Bassecourt served as a standard-bearer in 1752 before being promoted to Grenadier lieutenant in 1772 and captain in 1774, seeing service in Portugal and Algiers. He was promoted to Infantry brigadier in 1783.

== Later career ==
Unfit for active service in the field, he was attached to Barcelona. Promoted to field marshal in 1789, he was interim military and civil governor of Ceuta (May – November 1793) and interim military and civil governor of Gerona (November 1793 – March 1795). While at Gerona he was promoted to lieutenant general (1794), before being appointed military and civil governor, and corregidor of Barcelona.

== Bibliography ==
- TePaske, John Jay (1964). The Governorship of Spanish Florida, 1700-1763. Durham: Duke University Press, 248 pages. ASIN: B0007DN7VE
