= Jack King (footballer, born 1928) =

Australian rules footballer

Personal information
- Full name: Jack King
- Born: 13 January 1928
- Died: 7 September 2011 (aged 83)
- Original team: Spotswood
- Height: 185 cm (6 ft 1 in)
- Weight: 84 kg (185 lb)

Playing career^{1}
Years	Club	Games (Goals)
1948–53	Footscray	36 (3)
- ^{1} Playing statistics correct to the end of 1953.

Jack King (13 January 1928 – 7 September 2011) was a former Australian rules footballer who played with Footscray in the Victorian Football League (VFL).
