= Jonathan King (soccer) =

South African soccer player

Personal information
- Full name: Jonathan Lance King
- Date of birth: 22 April 1993 (age 33)
- Position: Right-back

Youth career
- Sydenham Barnsley
- 2010–2012: Nike Academy

Senior career*
Years	Team	Apps	(Gls)
2014	Blackburn Rovers (SA)	8	(0)
2014–2016	Black Leopards	15	(0)
2016	Santos (SA)	5	(0)
Total		28	(0)
- * Club domestic league appearances and goals

Jonathan Lance King (born 22 April 1993) is a South African former soccer player who played as a midfielder.

== Club career ==
King, along with compatriot Reyaad Pieterse, was chosen along with six other young footballers for the Nike Academy's The Chance; a scouting project to find the best unsigned talent from around the world, with the hope of finding them a professional club to sign for. Prior to this experience, he had played for Sydenham Barnsley in Durban.

On his return to South Africa, King had a short spell with Blackburn Rovers (SA), before moving to Black Leopards in November 2014. After two seasons with the Leopards, in which he featured sparingly, he moved to fellow National First Division side Santos (SA).

== Career statistics ==
=== Club ===
Appearances and goals by club, season and competition
Club	Season	League			National Cup		League Cup		Other		Total	
Club	Season	Division	Apps	Goals	Apps	Goals	Apps	Goals	Apps	Goals	Apps	Goals
Blackburn Rovers (SA)	2013–14	National First Division	8	0	0	0	0	0	0	0	8	0
Black Leopards	2014–15	National First Division	10	0	0	0	0	0	2 (Note: Appearances in the First Division Play-offs)	0	12	0
Black Leopards	2015–16	National First Division	5	0	0	0	0	0	0	0	5	0
Black Leopards	Total		15	0	0	0	0	0	2	0	17	0
Santos (SA)	2016–17	National First Division	5	0	0	0	0	0	0	0	5	0
Career total			28	0	0	0	0	0	2	0	30	0
