= USS John King =

Charles F. Adams-class destroyer

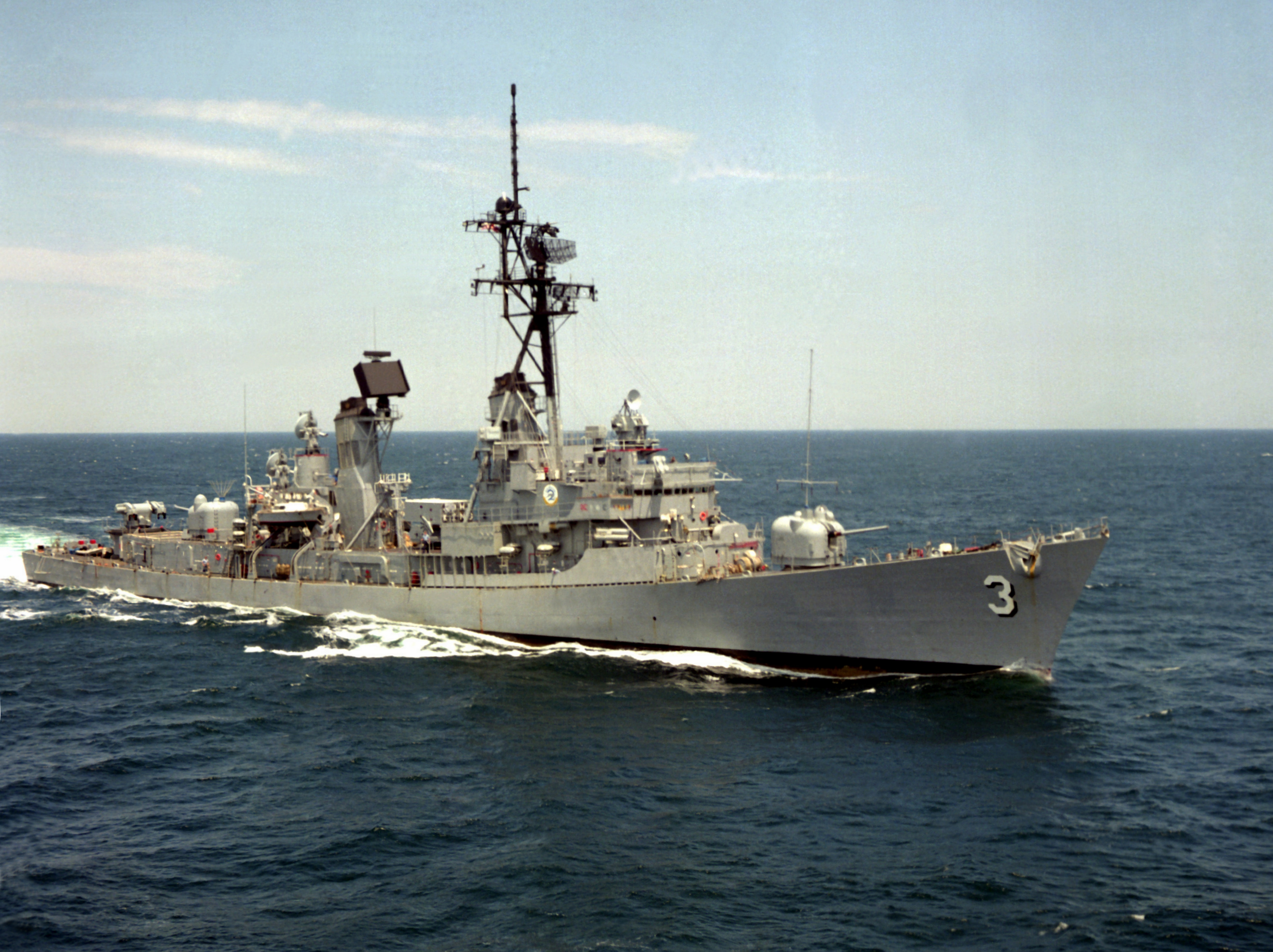
- USS John King underway in 1983

History

United States
- Name: John King
- Namesake: John King
- Ordered: 28 March 1957
- Builder: Bath Iron Works
- Laid down: 25 August 1958
- Launched: 30 January 1960
- Acquired: 27 January 1961
- Commissioned: 4 February 1961
- Decommissioned: 30 March 1990
- Reclassified: DDG-3, 23 April 1957
- Stricken: 12 January 1993
- Identification: Callsign: NDFQ; Hull number: DD-953
- Motto: Power for Peace
- Fate: Scrapped, 10 February 1999

General characteristics
- Class & type: Charles F. Adams-class destroyer
- Displacement: 3,277 tons standard, 4,526 full load
- Length: 437 ft (133 m)
- Beam: 47 ft (14 m)
- Draft: 15 ft (4.6 m)
- Propulsion: 2 × General Electric steam turbines providing 70,000 shp (52 MW); 2 shafts; 4 × Babcock & Wilcox 1,275 psi (8,790 kPa) boilers
- Speed: 33 knots (61 km/h; 38 mph)
- Range: 4,500 nautical miles (8,300 km) at 20 knots (37 km/h)
- Complement: 354 (24 officers, 330 enlisted)
- Sensors & processing systems: AN/SPS-39 3D air search radar; AN/SPS-10 surface search radar; AN/SPG-51 missile fire control radar; AN/SPG-53 gunfire control radar; AN/SQS-23 Sonar and the hull mounted SQQ-23 Pair Sonar for DDG-2 through 19; AN/SPS-40 Air Search Radar
- Armament: 1 Mk 11 missile launcher (DDG2-14) or Mk 13 single arm missile launcher (DDG-15-24) for RIM-24 Tartar SAM system, or later the RIM-66 Standard (SM-1) and Harpoon antiship missile; 2 × 5"/54 caliber Mark 42 (127 mm) gun; 1 × RUR-5 ASROC Launcher; 6 × 12.8 in (324 mm) ASW Torpedo Tubes (2 x Mark 32 Surface Vessel Torpedo Tubes)

USS John King (DD-953/DDG-3) was a Charles F. Adams-class guided missile armed destroyer in the United States Navy named for Medal of Honor recipient John King.

John King was laid down by the Bath Iron Works at Bath in Maine on 25 August 1958, launched on 30 January 1960 by Mrs. Paul J. Kilday, wife of Representative Kilday of Texas and commissioned on 4 February 1961; Comdr. Albert M. Sackett in command. John King was ordered as DD-953, reclassified as DDG-3 on 16 August 1956 and reclassified as DDG-3 on 26 June 1957. John King participated in blockade duties during the Cuban Missile Crisis in October 1962.

== Service history ==
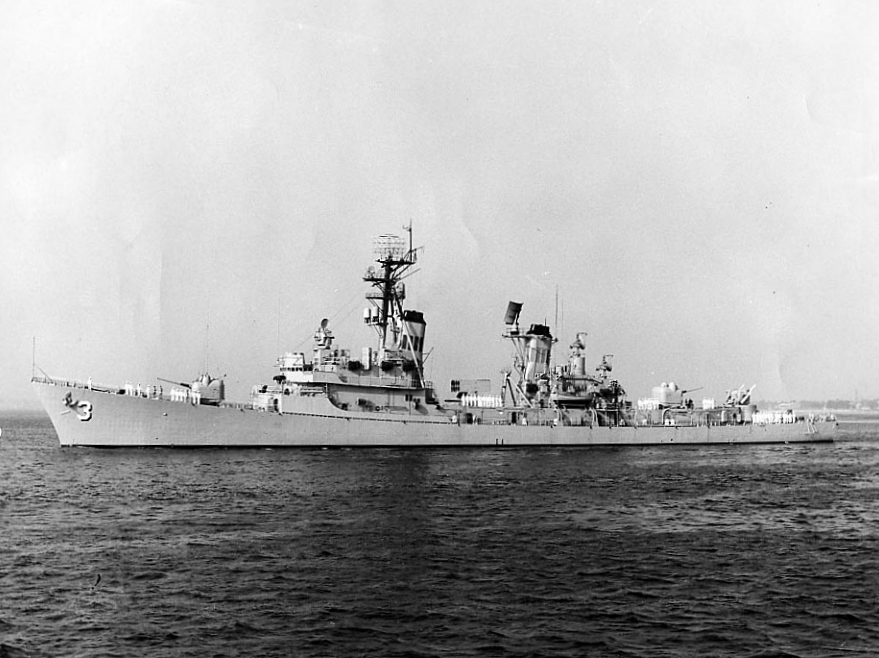
John King underway in 1961

Following shakedown training out of Guantánamo Bay, Cuba, John King carried out weapons tests on the East Coast before arriving Norfolk 7 September 1961 for regular duty. One of a new class of guided missile destroyers, she featured latest hull design with all-aluminum superstructure and mounted the very latest in modern armament and electronic equipment. Departing 27 November 1961, the ship cruised to England and Northern Europe until 1 January 1962, when she sailed from Dublin for the Mediterranean. There, John King joined the 6th Fleet in its constant role of peacekeeping in this troubled region. After her return to Norfolk, Virginia in April, the ship conducted missile firing exercises and training in the Caribbean. She arrived Washington 10 July 1962 for a 4-day stay, entertaining a group of Senators and Congressmen as well as Secretary of the Navy Fred Korth.

Following additional exercises, John King entered Norfolk Navy Yard 11 October 1962. Soon afterward, the introduction of offensive missiles into Cuba precipitated a crisis; and, as Navy ships placed a quarantine around the island, the ship quickly finished her repairs and joined the blockade 6 November. After the crisis eased, the ship remained in the Caribbean operating with the Navy's newest and biggest carrier, the nuclear-powered USS Enterprise (CVN-65). She returned to Norfolk 8 December 1962.

John King departed for her second Mediterranean cruise 6 February 1963. After visiting various ports on 6th Fleet maneuvers, she steamed to Kiel, Germany, 23 June 1963, then returned to Norfolk 17 July 1963. The next twelve months were spent on training and readiness exercises off the Virginia Capes and in the Caribbean, including a week at the Anti-submarine Warfare School, Key West, Florida, in April 1964.

The destroyer sailed for the Mediterranean Sea once more 3 August 1964 and joined the 6th Fleet 16 August near the strife-torn island of Cyprus. She remained in the Mediterranean until the end of 1964.

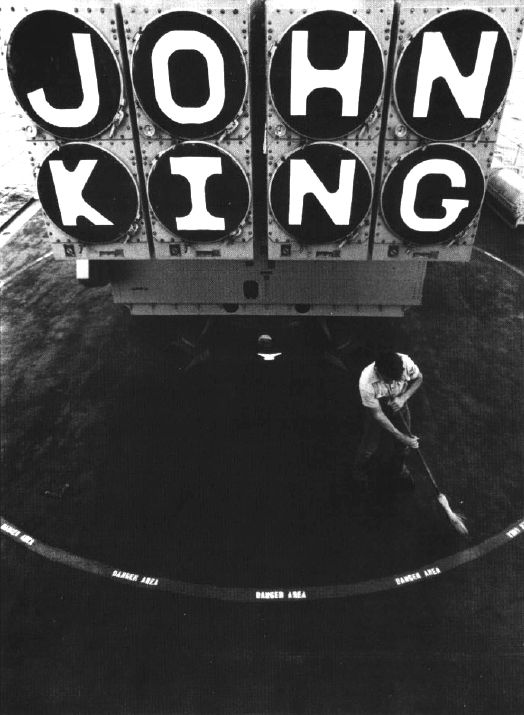
Back of RUR-5 ASROC on John King in 1985

John King returned to Norfolk 29 January and operated along the East Coast until sailing for the "Med" 14 October. Following 4 months of operations with the 6th Fleet, she returned to Norfolk 7 March 1966. In the summer she visited the Mediterranean and recrossed the Atlantic on NATO Exercise "Straight Laced." Back at homeport in the fall she operated out of Norfolk until sailing for another 6th Fleet deployment 10 January 1967. Her movements were concentrated in the Western Mediterranean until she sailed for home 11 May. Arriving Norfolk on the 19th, John King entered the Norfolk Naval Shipyard 27 June 1967 for an overhaul to prepare for future service.

Throughout the 70's and 80's, John King participated various NATO exercises and supported Atlantic Fleet operations during the Cold War. In 1982, John King was off the coast of Beirut, Lebanon, providing gunfire support to the U.S. Marines.

John King was decommissioned on 30 March 1990, was stricken from the Naval Vessel Register on 12 January 1993 and sold for scrap on 10 February 1999.
