= Jack King (footballer, born 1919) =

Australian rules footballer, born 1919

Personal information
- Full name: John Francis King
- Born: 9 April 1919; Oakleigh, Victoria
- Died: 21 July 2012 (aged 93); Warburton, Victoria
- Original team: East Burwood
- Height: 174 cm (5 ft 9 in)
- Weight: 83 kg (183 lb)
- Position: Centre / Forward

Playing career^{1}
| Years | Club | Games (Goals) |
| 1941–45 | Hawthorn | 69 (37) |
- ^{1} Playing statistics correct to the end of 1945.

John Francis King (9 April 1919 – 21 July 2012) was an Australian rules footballer who played with Hawthorn in the Victorian Football League (VFL).
