= John King (Michigan politician) =

American politician

Member of the Michigan House of Representatives from the Washtenaw County district
- In office January 2, 1843 – March 9, 1843

John King was a Michigan politician.

In 1839, King served as a justice of the peace in Northfield Township, Michigan alongside Rufus Matthews, Alvin Moe, and Nathan Sutton. In 1842, King served as treasurer of Northfield Township. On November 7, 1842, King was elected to the Michigan House of Representatives where he represented the Washtenaw County district from January 2, 1843 to March 9, 1843. During his term in the legislature, he served on the Banks and Incorporations committee.
