= Sunchado cannons =

Sunchado cannons (or zunchado), meaning wrapped, belted, banded, or built-up, described Spanish coastal artillery weapons constructed in the third quarter of the 19th century. Some, such as the 150mm (5.9") caliber rifled guns, were breech-loading. However others, such as the Model 1872 210mm (8.3") rifled howitzers, were muzzle-loading.

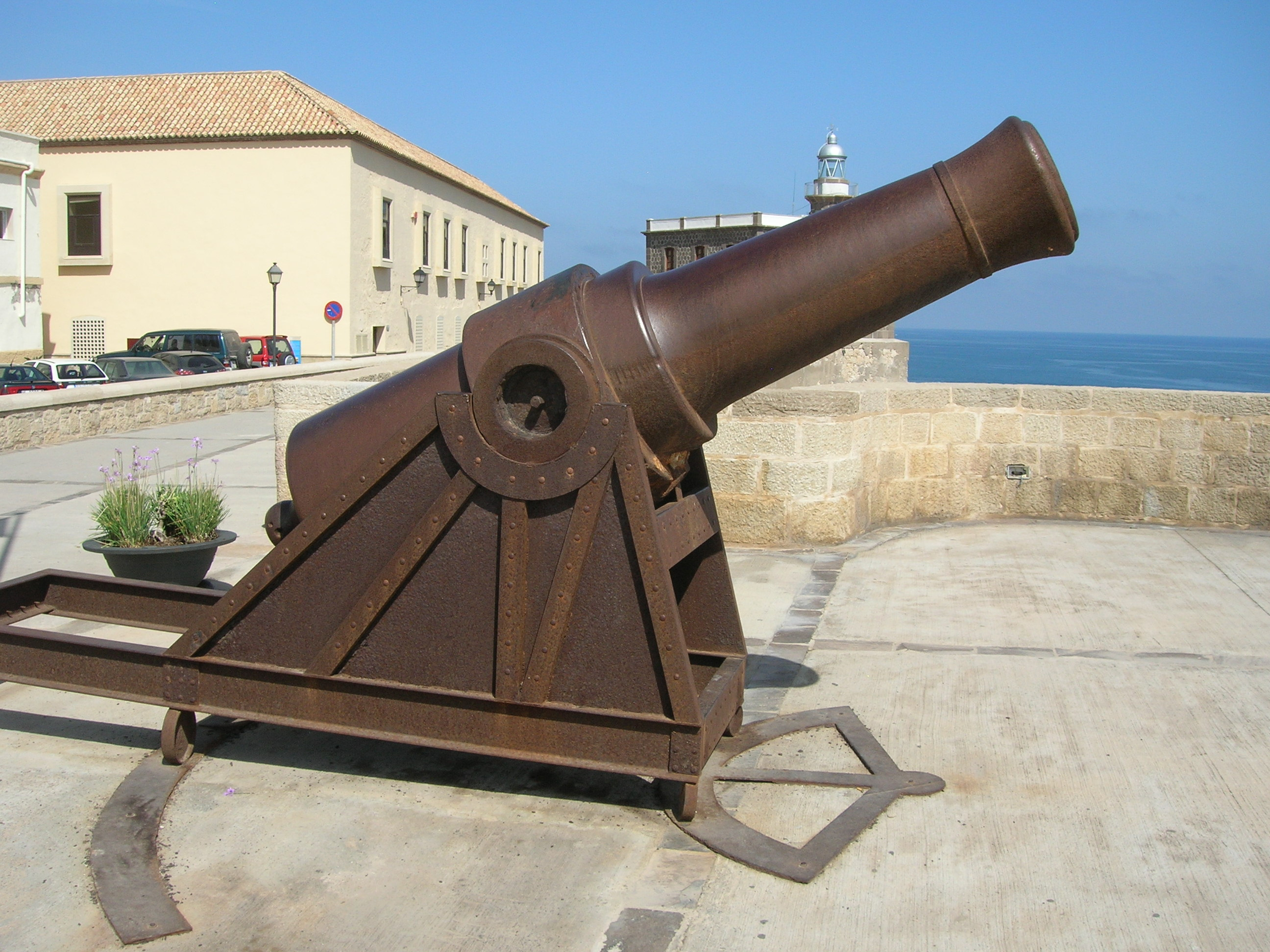
Muzzle-loading sunchado howitzer, Melilla

The Spanish installed these guns in their North African enclaves such as Melilla, and their New World colonies of Puerto Rico and Cuba. Some of the sunchado cannons finally saw action during the Spanish–American War, when they were at best obsolescent, and in the case of the M1872, totally obsolete.

During the American bombardment of San Juan, the San Fernando Battery, with its four M1872 210mm (8.3") sunchado howitzers, the Santa Elena battery with three more, and the San Agustin battery with three almost as obsolete 150mm sunchado guns, returned fire. Neither American nor Spanish gunnery was particularly effective, so casualties were light.

The Americans also captured a number of sunchado howitzers in Cuba, including four at the Santa Clara Battery outside Havana.
