= USS Niagara (1898) =

Cargo ship of the United States Navy

History

United States
- Name: USS Niagara
- Namesake: Fort Niagara
- Builder: John Roach & Sons, Chester, Pennsylvania
- Completed: 1877
- Acquired: 11 April 1898
- Commissioned: 11 April 1898
- Decommissioned: 14 October 1898
- Fate: Sold 19 July 1899

General characteristics
- Type: Distilling and supply ship
- Displacement: 5,221 tons
- Length: 274 ft 0 in (83.52 m)
- Beam: 38 ft 0 in (11.58 m)
- Draft: 19 ft 6 in (5.94 m)
- Speed: 12 knots (22 km/h)
- Complement: 57
- Armament: 2 × 6-pounder guns; 4 × 3-pounder guns; 2 × 37 mm guns; 1 × Colt machine gun

The third USS Niagara was a distilling and supply ship that served in the United States Navy during the Spanish–American War.

== Acquisition ==
Niagara was a steamer built by John Roach & Sons, Chester, Pennsylvania in 1877. The U.S. Navy acquired her from the Ward Line on 11 April 1898 for service in the Spanish–American War. Fitted out as a distilling and supply ship of the Collier Service, she commissioned at New York, New York, on 11 April 1898.

== Operational history ==
Niagara departed New York on 25 April 1898 for the Caribbean Sea via Norfolk, Virginia, and Key West, Florida. During the Spanish–American War she served the fleet off Cuba, Puerto Rico, and Haiti. The ship returned to Hampton Roads, Virginia, on 26 May 1898.

She departed Hampton Roads on 30 May 1898, again bound for ports in Cuba and Puerto Rico. Niagara remained on station in the Caribbean Sea until 24 July 1898 when she departed Guantanamo Bay, Cuba, for New York, arriving 3 September 1898.

== Final Disposition ==
Niagara remained at New York until she decommissioned on 14 October 1898. She was sold on 19 July 1899.
