= John A. King House =

Historic house in Florida, United States

- U.S. National Register of Historic Places
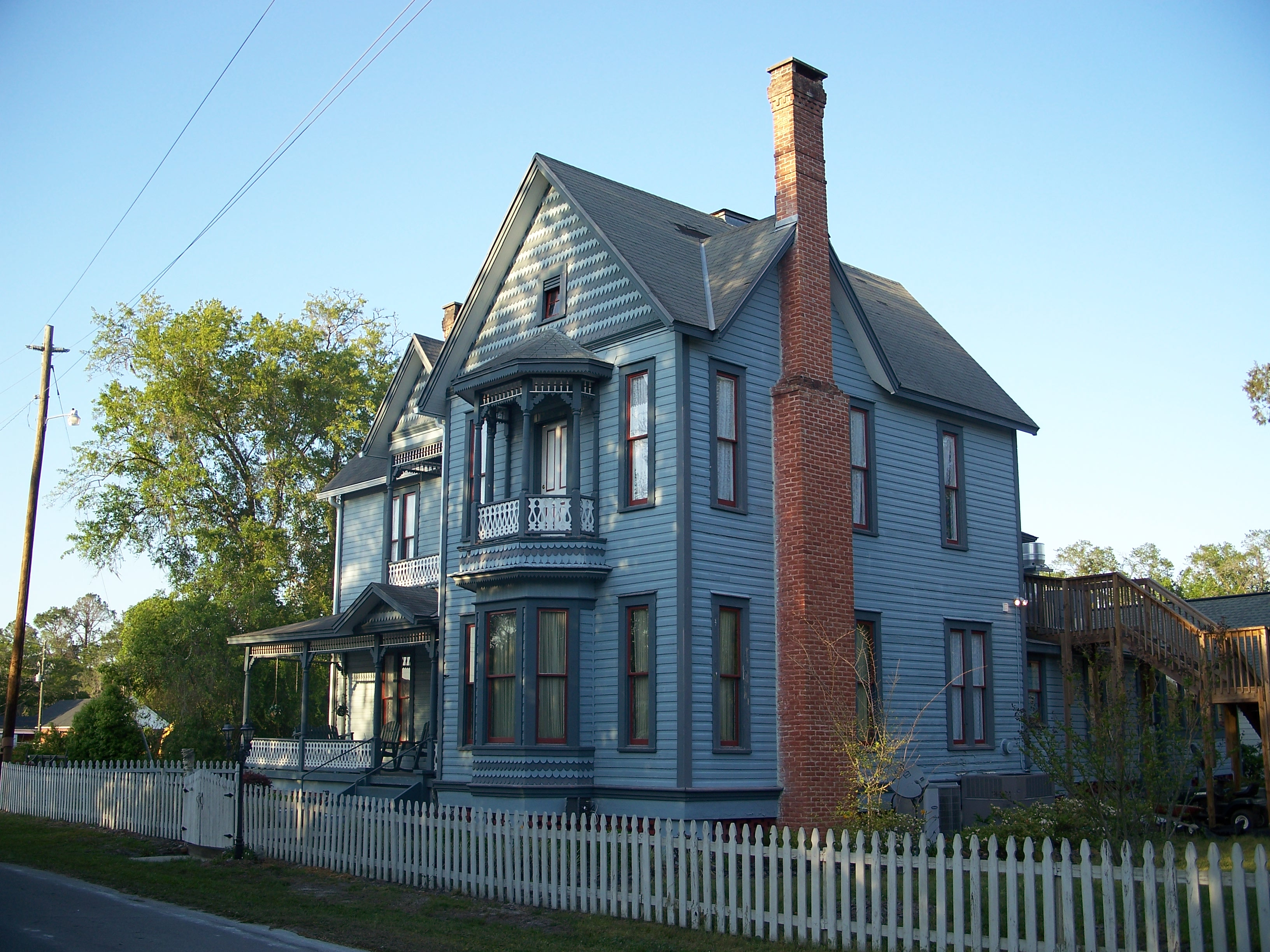

- Location within Florida Location within the United States
- Location: Lake Butler, Florida
- Coordinates: 30°1′20″N 82°20′14″W
- NRHP reference No.: 04000264
- Added to NRHP: April 6, 2004

The John A. King House (also known as the Coleman House) is a historic house in Lake Butler, Florida, United States, located at 105 Southeast 1st Avenue. On April 6, 2004, it was added to the National Register of Historic Places.
