= Jack King (footballer, born 1902) =

English footballer (1902–1988)

Personal information
- Full name: John King
- Date of birth: 8 January 1902
- Place of birth: Pendlebury, England
- Date of death: 1988 (aged 85–86)
- Position: Winger

Senior career*
Years	Team	Apps	(Gls)
1923–1924	Newtown United		
1924–1925	Mossley		
1926–1931	Oldham Athletic	80	(12)
1931	Rossendale United		
1931	Ashton National		
1932	Mossley		
1932	Ashton National		
1933–1934	Huddersfield Town	0	(0)
1934	Stalybridge Celtic		
1934	Ashton National		
1935	Pendlebury		
1936	Bacup Borough		
1937	South Liverpool		
Total		80	(12)
- * Club domestic league appearances and goals

John King (8 January 1902 – 1988) was an English footballer who played in the Football League for Oldham Athletic.
