= John King (archdeacon of Killala) =

John King was an Anglican priest in Ireland during the late eighteenth and early nineteenth centuries.

The second son of Admiral Edward Durnford King, he was educated at Trinity College, Dublin. He was Vicar general of the Diocese of Tuam, Killala and Achonry from 1790 to 1799; and Archdeacon of Killala from 1799 until his death in 1818.
