= John King (rugby league) =

English rugby league footballer

Personal information
- Born: unknown

Playing information
Club
Years	Team	Pld	T	G	FG	P
1948–47/48	Featherstone Rovers	4	0	1	0	2

John King (birth year unknown) is a former professional rugby league footballer who played in the 1940s. He played at club level for Featherstone Rovers.

== Club career ==
John King made his début for Featherstone Rovers on Saturday 24 January 1948.
