= John King (Suffolk cricketer) =

English cricketer

John Philip King (1797 – 4 October 1842) was an English cricketer with amateur status who was associated with Suffolk and made his debut in 1830.

== Bibliography ==
- Haygarth, Arthur (1996) [1862]. Scores & Biographies, Volume 1 (1744–1826). Kennington: Frederick Lillywhite. ISBN 978-19-00592-23-9.
- Haygarth, Arthur (1997) [1862]. Scores & Biographies, Volume 2 (1827–1840). Kennington: Frederick Lillywhite. ISBN 978-19-00592-23-9.
