= Jack King (footballer, born 1901) =

English footballer

Personal information
- Full name: John King
- Date of birth: 1901
- Place of birth: Birmingham, England
- Position: Inside forward

Senior career*
Years	Team	Apps	(Gls)
1919–1920	Hockley St George		
1920–1921	Hinckley United		
1921–1924	Leicester City	7	(4)
1924–1925	Halifax Town	12	(5)
1925	Nuneaton Town		
1926	Kidderminster Harriers		
1926	Hinckley United		
Total		19	(9)
- * Club domestic league appearances and goals

John King (born 1901) was an English footballer who played in the Football League for Halifax Town and Leicester City.
