= USS Vicksburg (PG-11) =

Gunboat of the United States Navy

- USS Vicksburg (PG-11)

History

United States
- Name: Vicksburg
- Namesake: Vicksburg, Mississippi
- Builder: Bath Iron Works, Bath, Maine
- Laid down: 17 January 1896
- Launched: 5 December 1896
- Acquired: 27 June 1897
- Commissioned: 23 October 1897
- Decommissioned: 24 May 1899
- Recommissioned: 15 May 1900
- Decommissioned: 15 July 1904
- Recommissioned: 17 May 1909
- Decommissioned: 18 June 1912
- Recommissioned: May 1914
- Decommissioned: June 1914
- Recommissioned: 13 April 1917
- Decommissioned: 16 October 1919
- Reclassified: PG-11, 17 July 1920
- Stricken: 2 May 1921
- Fate: Transferred to Coast Guard, 18 August 1922
- Name: Alexander Hamilton (WIX 272)
- Commissioned: 18 August 1922
- Decommissioned: 7 June 1930
- In service: 7 June 1930
- Out of service: 30 December 1944
- Renamed: Beta, between 1 July 1935 and 1 July 1936
- Fate: Returned to U.S. Navy, 12 March 1945; Transferred to the War Shipping Administration, 28 March 1946, and sold for scrap

General characteristics
- Type: Annapolis class gunboat
- Displacement: 1,010 long tons (1,030 t)
- Length: 204 ft 5 in (62.31 m)
- Beam: 36 ft (11 m)
- Draft: 12 ft 9 in (3.89 m)
- Installed power: 1,118 ihp (834 kW)
- Propulsion: 1 × triple expansion steam engine; 1 × screw
- Speed: Under Steam: 13 kn (15 mph; 24 km/h); Under Sail: 6.5 kn (7.5 mph; 12.0 km/h)
- Complement: 143
- Armament: 6 × 4 in (100 mm) guns; 4 × 6-pounder (57 mm (2.24 in)) rapid-fire guns; 2 × 1-pounder (37 mm (1.46 in)) rapid fire guns; 1 × M1895 Colt–Browning machine gun

USS Vicksburg was a United States Navy gunboat laid down in March 1896 at Bath, Maine, launched on 5 December 1896 from the Bath Iron Works yard, and commissioned on 23 October 1897. The vessel was sponsored by Addie Trowbridge, and named after the town of Vicksburg, where her father was mayor at the time.

== Service history ==
=== Spanish–American War, 1898–1899 ===
Vicksburg left Newport, Rhode Island on 16 January 1898, sailing for Saint Thomas in the Caribbean. On 26 April, at the start of the Spanish–American War, she sailed south to join in the blockade of Cuba. For the next three months, Vicksburg patrolled the Cuban coast near Havana, returning to Key West, Florida periodically for fuel and provisions. During her tour of duty in Cuban waters, she captured three blockade runners. In May, she took Oriente, Fernandito, and Bernardico on the 5th, 7th, and 9th, respectively. The Oriente and Fernandito were small unarmed sailing ships bound from the Gulf of Campeche to Havana with cargoes of fish. Vicksburg took each to Key West where they were condemned by a prize court. Her fourth and final capture came more than a month later on 24 June when she encountered Ampala, a 150 long tons (150 t) sailing vessel, bound from Havana to Trujillo. Though Ampala carried no cargo save provisions for her passengers, Vicksburg took her to Key West where she, too, was duly condemned. On 7 May, Vicksburg came under the fire of the Santa Clara Battery shore battery near Havana, and again on 14 August. By then, hostilities in Cuba were ending, and the need for blockading ships diminished. Vicksburg departed Cuban waters on the 14th and, after a three-day stop at Key West, continued north to Newport where she arrived on 23 August. During the remaining months of 1898 and the first five months of 1899, she operated along the east coast and in the Caribbean. On 24 May 1899, Vicksburg was placed out of commission at Boston.

=== Asiatic Station, 1900–1904 ===
Almost a year later, on 15 May 1900, the gunboat was recommissioned at Newport, R.I. After six months of operations in the Atlantic, Vicksburg stood out of Boston on 9 November for duty on the Asiatic Station. She sailed via the Mediterranean Sea and the Suez Canal and arrived at Cavite—on the island of Luzon in the Philippines—on 2 February 1901. During the first of her three years in the Far East, Vicksburg joined other Navy units in supporting the Army's campaign in the Philippine–American War which followed Spain's ceding the islands to the U.S. Vicksburg herself contributed significantly to the success of those operations when she assisted Army forces in capturing the Philippine president, Emilio Aguinaldo, at Palanan, Isabela in March 1901. She also cooperated with the Army again in June during the occupation of Puerto Princesa and Cuyo, the two major cities on the island.

In 1902, the warship moved north and, for the remaining two years of her tour, cruised the waters off the coasts of China, Japan, and Korea. She spent the entire first quarter of 1904 at Chemulpo, Korea, protecting American interests during the initial stages of the Russo-Japanese War. On 9 June 1904, Vicksburg took leave of Asia when she stood out of Yokohama, Japan, and shaped a course for home. She reached Bremerton, Washington, on 29 June but later moved south to the Mare Island Navy Yard near San Francisco, California. There, she was placed out of commission, in reserve, on 15 July 1904.

=== Central America, 1909–1912 ===
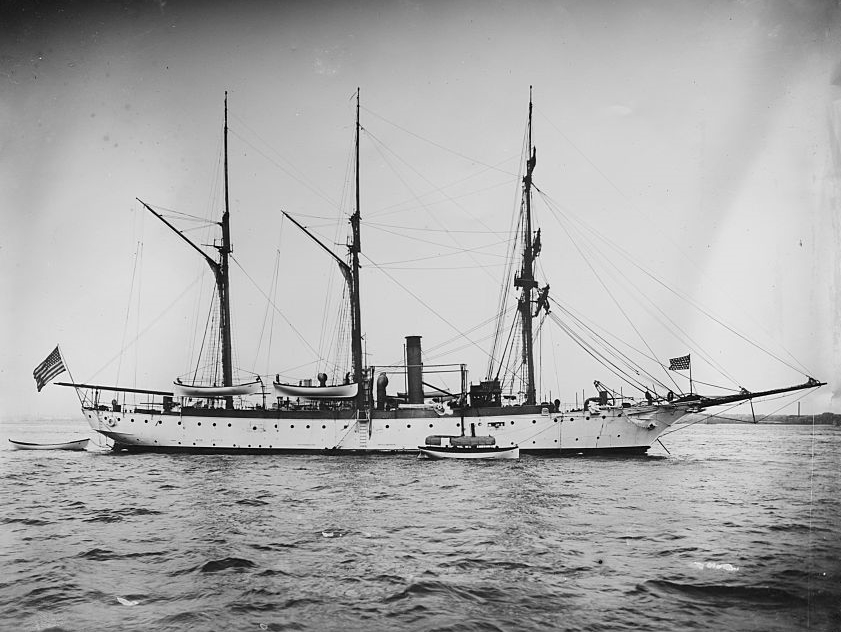
Vicksburg, U.S.N. 24 November 1909

After almost five years of inactivity, Vicksburg was placed back in commission at Mare Island on 17 May 1909. The gunboat departed San Francisco on 16 June and headed south to the coast of Mexico and the Isthmus of Panama. During the next four years, she cruised the western coast of Central America in an effort to support American diplomatic moves to maintain peace in the revolution-prone nations in the area. For that purpose, she made calls at ports in Mexico, Honduras, El Salvador, Guatemala, and Panama. Conditions in Nicaragua were especially volatile during those years, and Vicksburg returned to Corinto and other Nicaraguan ports time and time again.

During the early summer of 1912, she began operating primarily along the California coast. In late August, she cruised south for an extended courtesy visit to Guaymas, Mexico. While there, Vicksburg was sent to assist the steam freighter Pleiades, which had reported running aground on the coast of lower California on August 16. Vicksburg sustained a hull puncture from a broken propeller while en route to provide aid, and the cruiser Cleveland was sent to escort Vicksburg back to the Mare Island Naval Shipyard. The damage was found to not be as severe as initially thought, and Vicksburg was instead led back to Guaymas, where she briefly remained for repairs before returning to duty on 2 September. The gunboat later returned to the U.S. at San Diego on 3 November.

=== Training ship, 1912–1917 ===
Following repairs at the Mare Island and the Puget Sound Navy Yards, she began duty with the Washington Naval Militia on 18 June. That service occupied her almost completely until the U.S. entered World War I in the spring of 1917. The only exception came in May–June 1914, when she was placed back in full commission for a brief cruise to Mexico. Upon her return to Puget Sound, she reverted to reserve status and resumed training duty with the Washington Naval Militia.

=== World War I, 1917–1921 ===
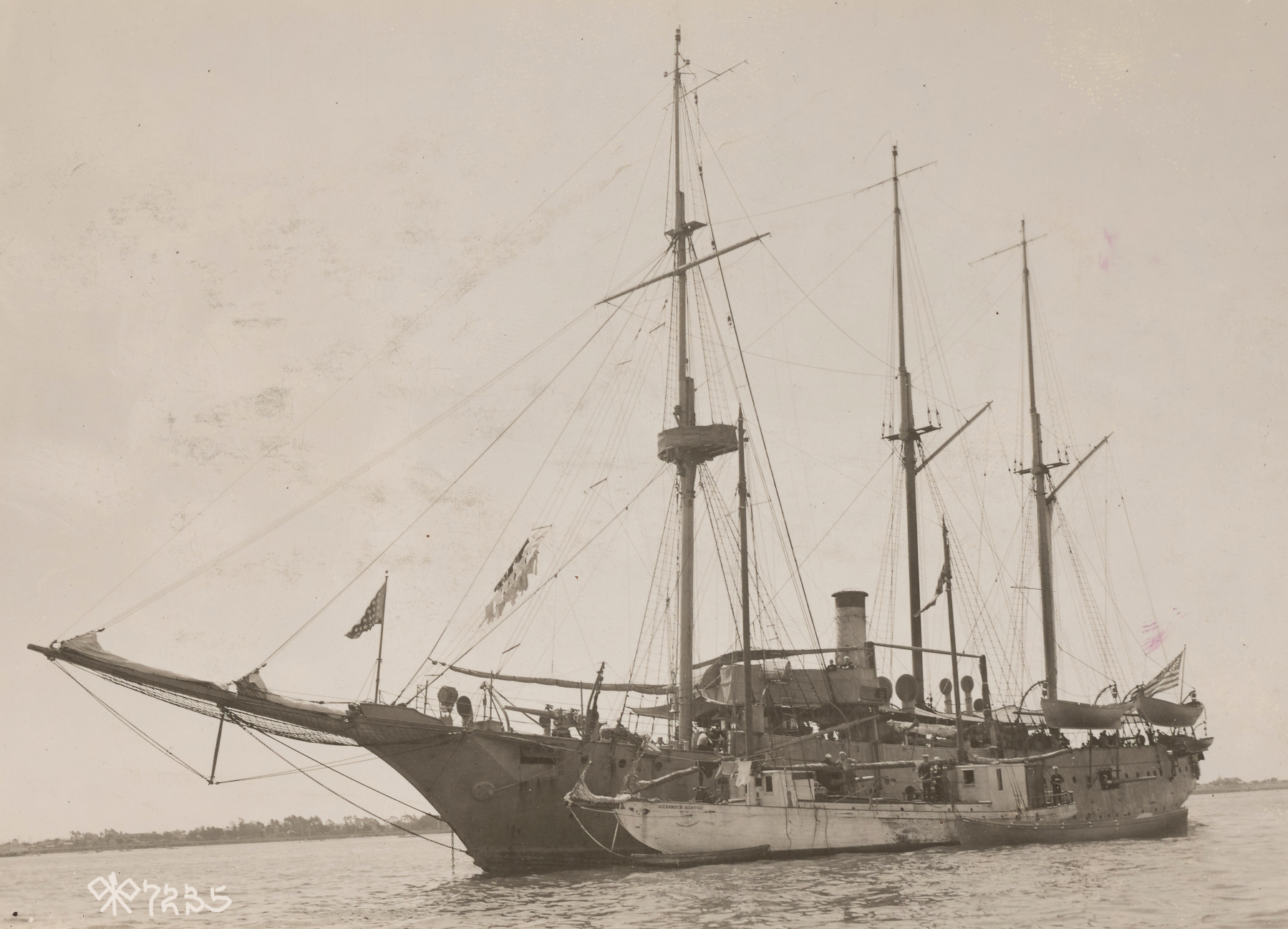
Schooner Alexander Agassiz alongside USS Vicksburg in March 1918

On 6 April 1917, the U.S. associated herself with the Allied Powers in World War I by declaring war on the German Empire. A week later, on 13 April, Vicksburg was placed back in full commission at Puget Sound. The gunboat patrolled the western coasts of the United States and Mexico through the end of the war. That German influence was particularly strong in Mexico during the war is evidenced by the fact that Germany started reasonably serious negotiations to persuade Mexico to enter the war on the side of the Central Powers. The infamous Zimmermann Telegram—which offered Mexico the opportunity to recoup her losses in the American Southwest—contributed greatly to the United States' decision to go to war against Germany. Thus, the Navy had to flex its muscles convincingly to dissuade Mexico from assisting the Central Powers. Vicksburg and the other ships which patrolled the Mexican coasts helped provide the influence necessary to keep that nation out of the enemy camp.

As a result of her mildly pro-German attitude, Mexico became a center for German activity in the western hemisphere, particularly after the U.S. entered the war. Incidents involving German nationals occurred frequently. One such incident provided Vicksburg with the single concrete reward for her vigilance. On 17 March 1918, she anchored off the harbor at Viejo Bay, Mexico, in response to information that a ship carrying German nationals would attempt to leave the port. At 12:25, she sighted the schooner Alexander Agassiz standing out to sea under the American flag and immediately got underway to intercept her. The schooner tried to make a dash for it, but a shot across her bow forced the Alexander Agassiz to heave to and submit to a search.

Vicksburg's boarding party made some interesting discoveries. The schooner carried 14 people, of whom five were German and six were Mexican. Two others were women, one of whom was purportedly the vessel's owner. The remaining passenger was an American, probably the informant upon whose advice the capture was made since he is listed in Vicksburg's war diary as "...one American spy..." The motorized sailing vessel also carried some small arms and a quantity of ammunition as well as a "German flag". The people were taken on board Vicksburg, and the five Germans were put in irons.

Vicksburg justified the capture on the fact that the schooner carried enemy nationals and that she possessed no proper ship's papers. In a three-hour discussion held that afternoon with the Captain of the Port, the British Vice Consul, and commanding officers of other American ships in the area, Vicksburg's commanding officer supported his action further with the fact that the passengers were seen to throw articles overboard just before the boarding party arrived and with the suggestion that the Alexander Agassiz had been fitted out as a raider. That shaky proposition was later repudiated by an American prize court which ordered that restitution be made to the owner of the schooner. It now seems likely that the five Germans were simply making a desperate attempt to return home.

Later that month, Vicksburg delivered her prize to San Diego and the prisoners to Los Angeles. She then resumed her patrols off California and remained so occupied through the remaining months of the war. The gunboat continued her active service for almost a year after hostilities stopped in November 1918. On 16 October 1919, she was finally decommissioned for the last time at Puget Sound; and, four days later, she was transferred to the Washington State Nautical School. Vicksburg served as a training ship with the school until 1921. During this period, she received the designation PG-11 on 17 July 1920, when the Navy adopted the alphanumeric system of hull designations.

=== Coast Guard, 1921–1944 ===
On 2 May 1921, Vicksburg was transferred once more—this time to the Coast Guard—and her name was struck from the Navy List. She was renamed Alexander Hamilton on 18 August 1922 and served as a training ship at the Coast Guard Academy until 1930. The Coast Guard decommissioned her on 7 June 1930, stripped her, and towed her to the depot at Curtis Bay, Maryland, where she was permanently assigned as station ship. Sometime between 1 July 1935 and 1 July 1936, she was renamed Beta and, by 1 July 1940, she had been reassigned to New London, Connecticut, as a station ship.

In 1942, she was towed back to Curtis Bay where she served as a training platform for machinist's mates and water tenders. That duty lasted until 30 December 1944, when she was finally placed out of service completely. On 28 March 1946, the hulk was turned over to the War Shipping Administration for final disposition. Presumably, she was scrapped.

Vicksburg was one of a very few American ships to see active service in the Spanish-American War, World War I, and World War II.

== Awards ==
- Sampson Medal
- Spanish Campaign Medal
- Philippine Campaign Medal
- World War I Victory Medal
- American Defense Service Medal
- American Campaign Medal
- World War II Victory Medal
