= Battle of Wolf Ravine =

Spanish colonial battle in Morocco, 1909

- Part of the Second Melillan campaign
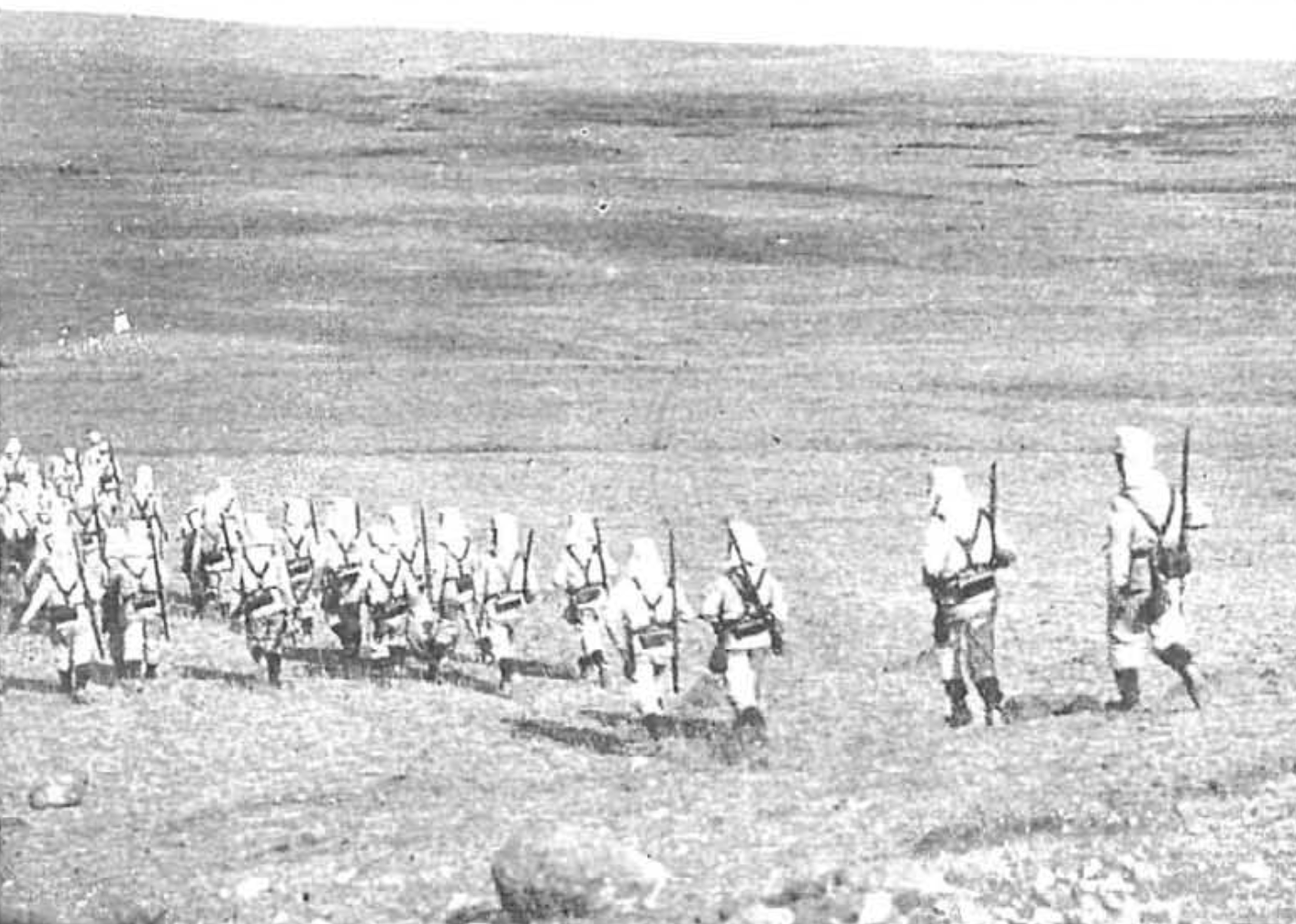
- Spanish troops on their way to Wolf Ravine
Date	27 July 1909
Location	near Melilla
Result	Riffian victory

Belligerents
Spain	(Morocco) Riffian tribes

Commanders and leaders
(Spain) José Marina Vega (Spain) Guillermo Pintos †	(Morocco) Mohammed Amezian

Casualties and losses
153 killed 500 wounded or 1,000 casualties (180 killed)	Unknown

The Battle of Wolf Ravine, also referred to as the Disaster of Wolf Ravine (Spanish: Desastre del Barranco del Lobo), was a military engagement between the Spanish army and the Riffian army; the battle was a military disaster for the Spanish army.

== Background ==
Spain stumbled into a colonial war in northern Morocco beginning in 1909, and since its beginning, the war was highly unpopular in Spain. The War of 1909 was mainly attributed to the mining interests of the ruling oligarchy, and its conscription system was deemed unjust. The draft of troops sparked anti-war protests, leading to Tragic Week.

== Prelude ==
In the events leading to the disaster at Wolf Ravine on July 27, two incidents took place four days earlier. A column had set out at night to reach the heights of the Riffians before dawn, who had been attacking Spanish convoys carrying supplies to the troops in advanced positions. With a little understanding and an inaccurate drawing of the area to guide him, the colonel and his men got lost and found themselves in another position secured by the Spanish. At daylight, the Riffians were able to fire at the Spanish gathering in a small space. The colonel encouraged his men to charge; however, he was killed alongside a number of men.

Later that day, another Spanish column of troops who had just arrived from Catalonia were halted by the Riffians during their cold ration launch. The Spanish commander, believing they had left the combat zone, allowed his men to rest and eat after a long journey, without a cover and leaving many rifles in a pile. As they sat down on the ground, the Riffians attacked them and killed many of them. Many soldiers ran off without their arms, and others were killed, including the commander and several officers.

== Battle ==
During the previous night of the battle, some 300 meters of railway lines leading to the mines had been ripped up and damaged by the Riffian tribes. On 27 June, the Spanish general, José Marina Vega, sent out two columns, one to protect the ones repairing the lines and another, led by Guillermo Pintos, to prevent the Riffians from leaving their valleys nearby. Pintos, who had only arrived in Morocco two days earlier, set off on his expedition to the foot of Mount Gurugu. In the middle of the day, the terrain leading to the Spanish seemed sloping, while in reality, it was rugged land with deep gullies leading to ravines.

As they marched, the Spanish found themselves under heavy fire as they crossed the rough terrain. Grouped in a dense formation, they began suffering heavy losses. As they were approaching the Wolf ravine, Pintos divided the column into two; the right-hand column managed to reach a hill right of the ravine; ignoring Marina's instruction, Pintos led the left column towards the ravine and was killed by a sniper shot as he sat to rest on a rock. The column that had penetrated the ravine began to be hit by heavy fire from above and both sides; most of the officers were shot dead, and the troops retreated in disorder, leaving behind a number of dead and wounded as well as mules carrying ammunition.

In this battle, the Spanish suffered 153 deaths and 500 wounded, or 1,000 casualties, including 180 deaths.

== Aftermath ==
The battle had the paradoxical effect of mobilizing support in Spain for military action. The defeat strengthened solidarity towards the military among the middle and upper classes; this brought passion and drama to daily life in the Peninsula; the facility to pay a tax to evade the war was suspended; some young aristocrats volunteered to serve in the Spanish army, giving them a new sense of identity; the military now felt they were defending the nation's pride; and the outrage over Spanish casualties strengthened their prejudice over the Riffians.

A popular song of the time called "Melilla is no longer Melilla," where some lyrics are "Melilla is a slaughterhouse, where the Spanish go to die like lambs."

== See also ==
- Rif War
- Battle of Annual
