= Kert campaign =

Military conflict between Spain and Riffian rebels

Kert Campaign
- Part of the Spanish-Moroccan conflicts and Scramble for Africa
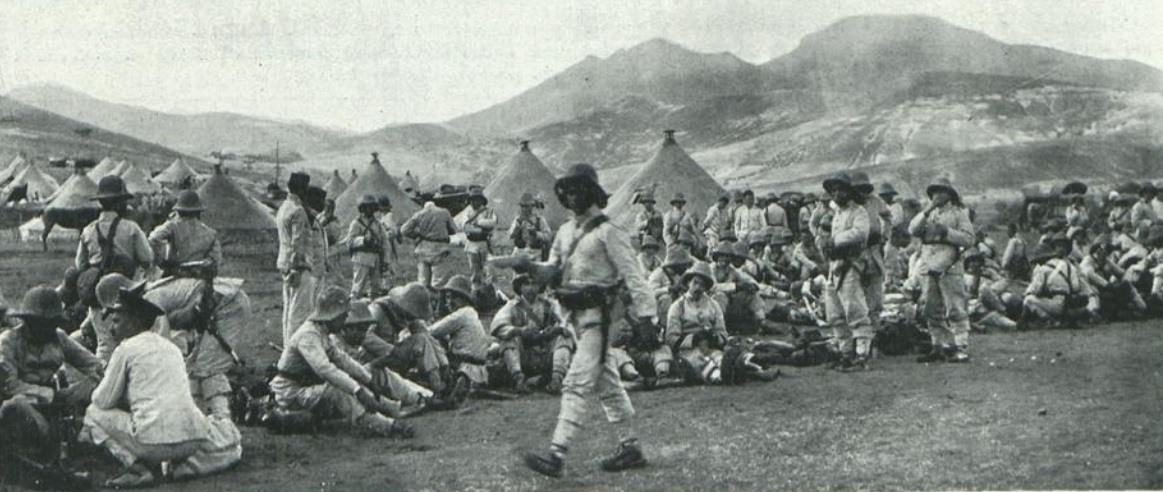
- Spanish military camp near the Kert River, October 1911
Date	24 August 1911 – 15 May 1912
Location	Eastern Rif, northern Morocco
Result	Spanish victory
Territorial changes	Consolidation of the Spanish-controlled territory in Iqer'iyen area east of the Kert River

Belligerents
Spain	(Morocco) Riffian tribes

Commanders and leaders
(Spain) José García Aldave (Spain) Agustín Luque (Spain) Dámaso Berenguer (Spain) Salvador Díaz †	(Morocco) Mohamed Ameziane † (Morocco) Mohamed Bourahail (Morocco) Amar El Kallouchi (Morocco) Mohamed Chadli (Morocco) Mohamed Bohout (Morocco) Mimoun Khouja † (Morocco) Mohamed Tabbaâ

Units involved
Spanish Army; Regulares	Riffian harkas

Casualties and losses
500 killed 1,900 wounded	Unknown

The Kert campaign (Spanish: campaña del Kert) was a conflict in northern Morocco between the colonial power of Spain and the indigenous Riffian harkas led by Mohammed Ameziane, who had called for a jihad against the Spanish occupation in the eastern Rif. It took place between 1911 and 1912.

== History ==
The campaign saw the introduction of the tropas regulares indígenas ("native regular troops"), created by Dámaso Berenguer on 30 June 1911.

The campaign followed a revolt initiated by Mohammed Ameziane, caïd of Segangan, who had called for a jihad and had attacked both Spanish and tribes friendly to them. After an attack on a group of Spanish military personnel undertaking topographic works at a position near Ishafen (near the river Kert) the Spanish campaign formally started on 24 August. A Spanish column had been however already shot on 30 June.

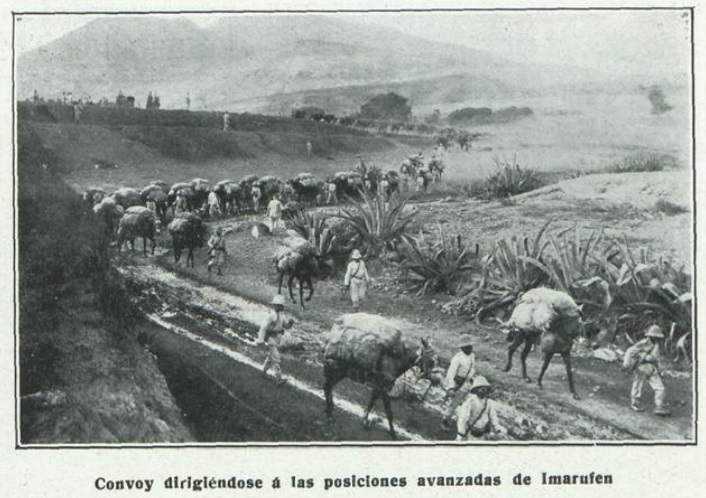
Spanish convoy heading for Imaroufene

Following a visit to Melilla, Spanish War Minister Agustín Luque took control of the operations on 7 October, and the struggles brought numerous losses to both sides, 64 death and 204 wounded on the Spanish side. On 14 October 1911 General Salvador Díaz Ordóñez was killed in action and a column commanded by General Navarro had 33 deaths and 105 wounded.

The Spanish forces took the position of Al Aaroui (Monte Arruit) on 18 January 1912.

The Spanish ended the campaign following the killing of Ameziane by native regulares on 15 May 1912. Si Mohammed Bourhayl replaced him but surrendered soon after. The Spanish losses by that time amounted to about 500 killed and 1,900 wounded. The Spanish control line was extended to the Kert River and the new boundaries for the Spanish-occupied territory entailed the annexation of the Berber cabiles of Aith Sidel and Aith Bouyafar.

== See also ==
- Hispano-Moroccan War (1859–1860)
- First Melillan campaign
- Second Melillan campaign

== Citations and references ==
=== References ===
- Barrio Jala, Manuel del (2002). "Nuestros Generales en el Norte de África" (PDF). Ejército. LXIII (732). Madrid: Ministry of Defence: 41–51. ISSN 0013-2918.
- Gajate Bajo, María (2012), Las campañas de Marrueco y la opinión pública. El ejemplo de Salamanca y su prensa (1906-1927) (PDF), Madrid: Instituto Universitario General Gutiérrez Mellado, ISBN 978-84-615-9842-7, archived from the original (PDF) on 2023-06-05
- León Rojas, José (2018). "Tarifa y las Campañas de Marruecos (1909-1927)". Aljaranda. 1 (92). Tarifa: Ayuntamiento de Tarifa. ISSN 1130-7986.
- Macías Fernández, Daniel (2013). "Las campañas de Marruecos (1909-1927)". Revista Universitaria de Historia Militar. 2 (3).
- Martínez Antonio, Francisco Javier (2006). "Tangerian Ghosts and Riffian Realities: The Limits of Colonial Public Health in Spanish Morocco (1906–1921)". In Nelson, M.C. (ed.). Occupational Health and Public Health: Lessons from the Past, Challenges for the Future (PDF). Sweden: National Institute for Working Life. pp. 180–250. ISBN 91-7045-810-3. ISSN 0346-7821.
- Ramos Oliver, Francisco (2013). "Las guerras de Marruecos" (PDF). Entemu. Gijón: UNED Centro Asociado de Asturias: 165–185. ISBN 978-84-88642-16-5. ISSN 1130-314X. Archived from the original (PDF) on 2020-08-27.
- Requejo Gómez, José Antonio (2017). Los Regulares en la Guerra de África. Valencia: Real Acadèmia de Cultura Valenciana.
