= Harka (disambiguation) =

Harka can be:

- Harka, a village in Győr-Moson-Sopron County, Hungary.
- Harka (film), a 2022 film by Lotfy Nathan.
- Harka (Maghreb), a military campaign in Northern Africa.
- ḥarka, a group of harkis, Muslim auxiliaries to the French Army in Algeria.
- ¡Harka!, a 1941 film by Carlos Arévalo Calvet.
