= Guillermo Pintos =

Spanish military personnel (1856–1909)

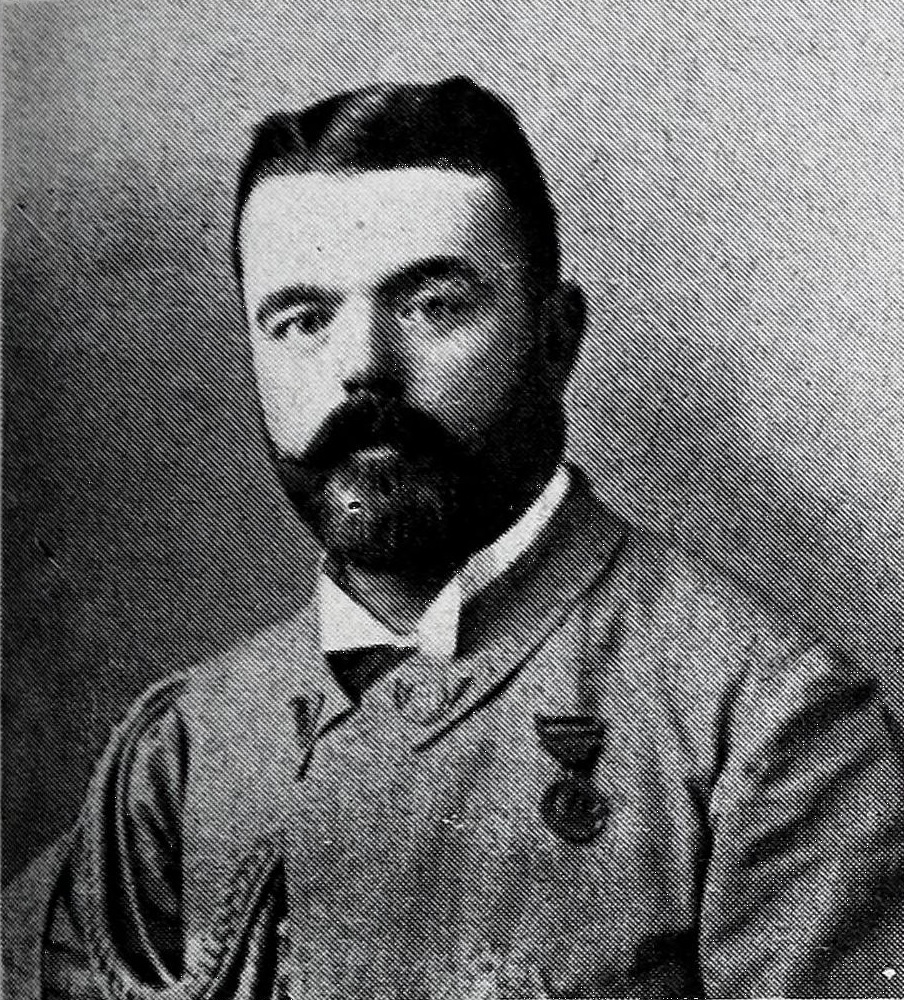
- Born: Guillermo Pintos Ledesma; 26 January 1856; Chafarinas Islands, Spain
- Died: 29 July 1909 (aged 53); Mount Gurugu, Morocco
- Education: Infantry Academy
- Military career
- Allegiance: Spain
- Branch: Spanish Army
- Service years: 1872–1909
- Rank: Brigadier general
- Conflicts: 3rd Carlist War (1874–1876); Ten Years' War (1876–1878); Moro conflict (1891); Cuban War (1896–1897); 2nd Melillan campaign † (1909)

Guillermo Pintos Ledesma (26 January 1856 – 27 July 1909) was a Spanish Army officer. He took part in the Third Carlist War, the Ten Years' War, the Moro conflict, and the 1895–1898 Cuban War. Promoted to brigadier general in 1905, he was killed in action at a ravine called Barranco del Lobo, during the Second Melillan campaign, leading a column of light infantry that was ambushed by Riffians at the foothills of the Mount Gurugu.

== Biography ==
Born on 26 January 1856, in the Chafarinas Islands, less than a decade after their occupation by Spain carried out by the General Serrano.

He joined the Valencia regiment as cadet in 1872, yet a year later, in July 1873, he shifted to the Infantry Academy.

Promoted to the rank of Alférez in April 1874, he was destined to the Zamora regiment, part of the Army of the North during the Third Carlist War. He participated in many battles of the conflict, including Monte Muru (June 1874), Oteiza (August 1874), and the lifting of the Carlist siege on Pamplona (February 1875), remaining in the campaign until the end of the war in 1876.

He joined the Army of Cuba later in 1876, joining the Expeditionary Battalion 32, taking part in operations against Cuban separatists. He belonged to the battalion of jägers of Morón, to the regiment of Cuba and to the battalion of jägers of Reus, and remained in the island until June 1878, returning after to Mainland Spain.

Destined to the Philippines, he was appointed as aide-de-camp of Valeriano Weyler in May 1888. In Manila, he also served as governor of the city prison. He was destined to Mindanao in 1891, where he took part in actions against moro insurgents in Bara, Malalí, Malabang and Laguna de Lanao, earning the rank of commander and returning to Manila in October 1891, and soon after, embarking to return to the Iberian Peninsula.

He went with Weyler to Cuba, taking part in many actions of the Cuban War. Ill, he returned to the Mainland Spain in 1897, where he continued serving as aid of Weyler throughout different posts held by the latter. He was appointed to lead the 31st Infantry Regiment "Asturias" in July 1901. He was promoted to Brigadier General on 30 June 1905.

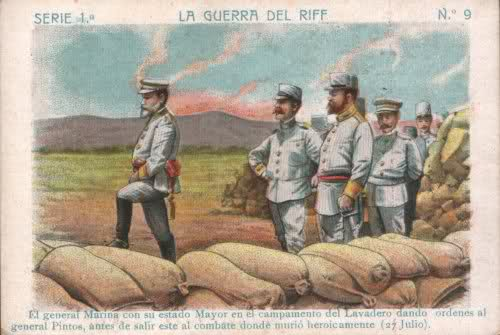
Generals Marina and Pintos

José Marina Vega entrusted him and his brigade with the vigilance over the area of the Wolf and the Alfer Ravines, in the foothills of the Mount Gurugu (to the south of Melilla), where Riffians were supposed to be strong.

The column (formed by 6 battalions) departed on 27 July; although Pinto only needed to keep the Riffians at a distance, he compromised the whole brigade for an advance into the ravine of the Barranco del Lobo. The left wing of the column was ambushed at the ravine by the enemy, who fired at them from the heights.

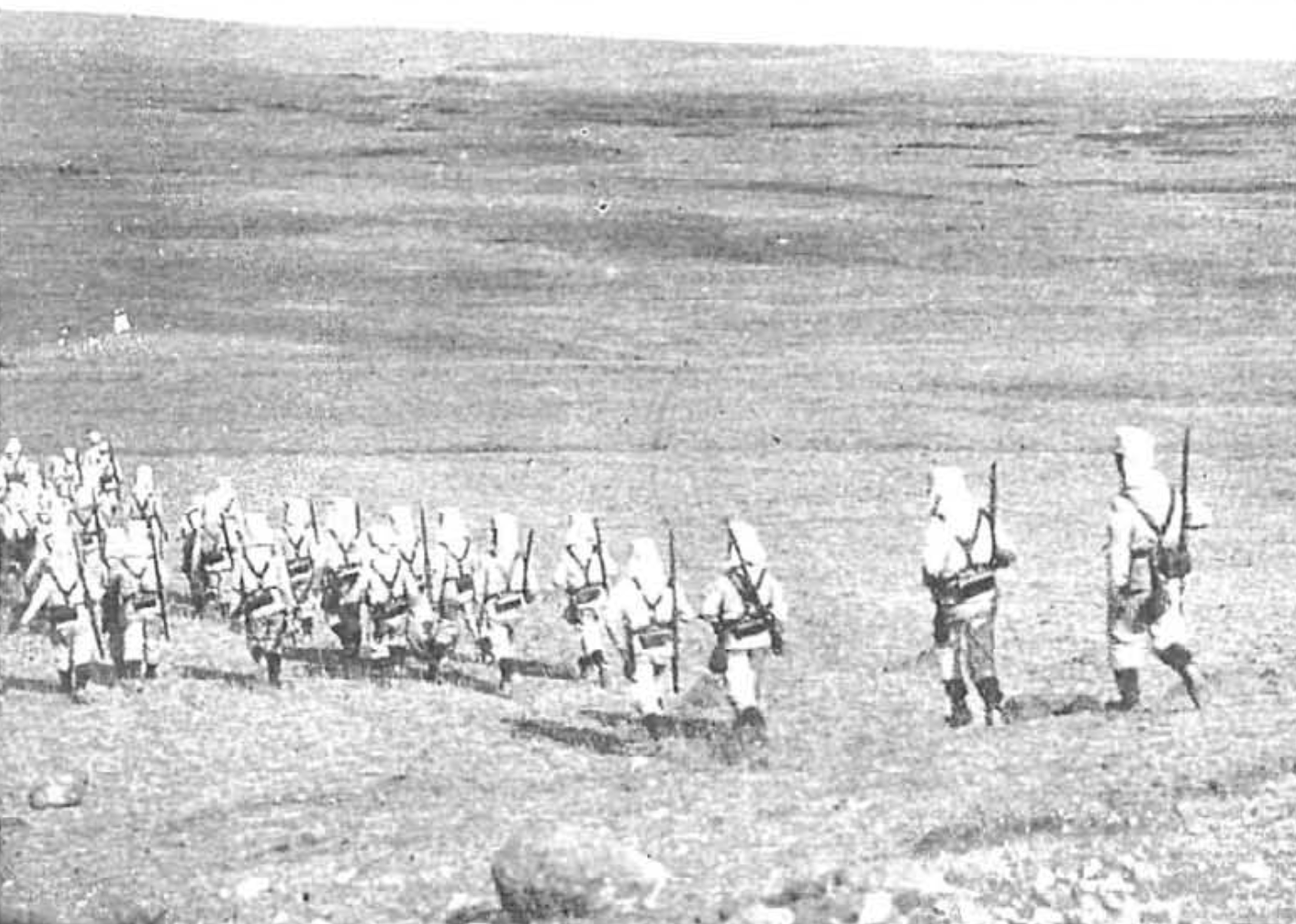
Light infantry departing Melilla on 27 July

The command underestimated the enemy and their favourable position and the Spanish soldiers repeatedly tried to clear them from their positions with no success. A disastrous retreat without artillery support was attempted later, leading to severe losses. Pintos had died before in the early stages of the operation, as having dismounted from his horse to rest, after advancing some positions with the right wing of the column near the ravine attempting to take the hill of Ait Aixa, a Riffian sniper killed him putting a bullet in his skull.

The operation (that came to be known as the Disaster of the Barranco del Lobo or Battle of Wolf Ravine) caused 750 Spanish casualties (including wounded and killed) and was the worst defeat suffered by the Spanish army during the Second Melillan campaign.
