= Mohammed Ameziane =

Moroccan sharif (1859–1912)

Mohamed Ben Elhaj Amezian محمد بن الحاج أمزيان
- Sharif
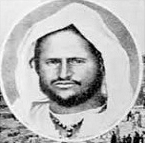
- Born: Mohammed ben al-Hajj; 1859; Segangan, Morocco
- Died: 15 May 1912 (aged 52–53); Kaddur, Morocco
- Religion: Sunni Islam
- Military career
- Allegiance: Rif Tribes
- Conflicts: Second Melillan campaign (1909); Kert campaign (1911–1912)

Mohammed Ben Elhaj Amezian (Arabic: الشريف محمد بن الحاج أمزيان, romanized: Sharif Muhammad bin al-Hajj Amziyan; 1859 – 15 May 1912), also known as El Mizzian by the Spanish, was a Riffian qaid and a Moroccan sharif who served as the main leader of the Riffian resistance against Spanish rule in northern Morocco prior to the rise of Abd el-Krim in 1921.

== Early life ==
Sharif Mohamed Amezian belonged to a Sharifian family that traced its lineage to Hasan ibn Ali and Fatima. Amezian is believed to have been descended from Idrisid Hammudids who lived among the Qala'iya tribe. His family created the Zawiya Al Qadiria which is also known by the Zawiya of Sidi Ahmed ou Abdsalam in Azghenghan. Both are located near Beni Bouifrour and are one of the five branches that comprise the Iqer'iyen tribe. Amezian memorized the Quran in his father's zawiya and joined the Mosque of al-Qarawiyyin to complete his studies between 1887 and 1891.

== Confrontation with Bou Hmara ==
After 1907, following the cession by Bou Hmara of the mining operations in the area to the Spanish, Ameziane fought the former. Bou Hmara tried to have him arrested in early 1907, but he managed to escape and took refuge in the Moroccan army base near Melilla.

Ameziane fought along the soldiers when they attempted to outflank the rebellion of Bou Hmara in the eastern region. However Bou Hmara and his forces defeated the weakened Makhzen in 1907, leading to the rest of the army, including Amezian, taking refuge in Melilla in the beginning of 1908.

During the domination of Bou Hmara over the eastern Rif he authorized two companies, a Spanish and a French one, to exploit the iron and lead mines in Bouifror and build two railway lines connecting them to Melilla. But after the crushing defeat inflicted on Bou Hmara by the Ait Waryaghel tribe, he returned to the east and found out that the eastern Riffian tribes had chosen Cherif Mohamed Amezian as their leader in October 1908. They hindered railway projects and the exploitation of the mines.

Bou Hmara, lacking enough Spanish support, was forced out of the area in late 1908.

== Resistance against Spain ==
Spain took advantage of Bou Hmara's rebellion in addition to the anarchy that prevailed in the eastern region and the enmity which existed between the tribes. During February and March 1909 it managed to occupy Kariat Arekmane and Ras El Ma, then it resumed the building of the railway and the exploitation of the mines. It also benefited from the growing influence of its allies in the region, and supported them with equipment and money, which the tribes used to support Spanish incursions openly and even tried to convince notables and tribes of the advantages of the Spanish incursions.

Amezian opposed the Spanish invasion and refused all offers by general José Marina Vega, the military governor of Melilla. After meeting raffian tribes, accompanied by Alfeqih Mohamed Hado Alazouzi, he started to resist the Spanish. He had to wait until the end of the agricultural season to attack Sidi Mosa on 9 July 1909, ending the hesitation of the tribes.

Following a shutdown of railway construction, building works resumed and, on 9 July, Ameziane instigated a party of Riffians to attack a group of 13 Spanish workers, killing and slitting the throats of 4 of them and wounding 3. (Note: The killed workers were: Emilio Esteban (born in Jérica), Cristóbal Sánchez (the foreman), Tomás Alineida (a Cuban mulatto), and Salvador Pérez.) This prompted a retaliatory action by Marina Vega, starting the Second Melillan campaign.

=== Spanish losses ===
The limited garrison in Melilla, unable to deal with the July 1909 attacks, forced the Spanish government to call for press gang in the Mainland, with the recruits lacking military training. The Spanish officers were also outdated in their tactics and did not have knowledge of the field, so the morale of the privates was very low. On 18 July, about 5,000 Riffians advanced on Sidi Hamet el Hach and were repelled by the Spanish. The attack was resumed at night, with the tribes retreating after suffering 300 deaths and inflicting 12 deaths and 22 wounded on the enemy. Ensuing confrontations in los Lavaderos and Sidi Musa followed on 23 July.

On 27 July the Spanish were handed an important defeat in the battle of "Aghazar n Ouchen" or Barranco del Lobo (Wolf's Ravine) 4 km away from Melilla, where 17 Spanish officers (including general Guillermo Pintos) and 136 privates were killed and 599 wounded.

This defeat did not deter the Spanish, which attacked with more than 40,000 soldiers under the leadership of three generals (Alfaro, Tobar and Miralis), but met another defeat on 20 September in Ijdyawen, the territory of ait chigar tribe.

=== Riffian resistance ===
The organization of the Riffian resistance in this period was marked by great precision, each of the tribes devoted a number of its men to remain permanently stationed in the stronghold of the Imjahden. Each tribe was free to organize, rotate its men and provide munitions. The men in the stronghold would light warning beacons at night upon perceiving signs of hostile attacks, so that all tribes would be aware and rush into the battle to join the imjahden's front lines.

=== Change in Spanish military strategy ===
Spain learned from its defeats in the autumn and summer of 1909, and waited until the end of the ploughing season to change its military strategy, focusing on peaceful penetration, targeting weaker tribes nearby Melilia and pouring money and trade privileges on them. Spain moved to a dangerous step when it intensified the recruitment of locals, so as to benefit from their experience and accurate knowledge of the topography of the region.

The recruited locals played the role of human shields in the front lines of the Spanish troops. This led to the disheartening of many Riffian imjahden fighters from central Rif, especially the Ait waryaghels, who left their strongholds, accusing the tribe of Aqqliat of treachery.

Moreover, the influence exerted by the Spanish within the tribes was detrimental to Riffian resistance, with spies providing the Spanish intelligence and implementing their plans to stir up disagreements and clashes between Imjahden members and their families, and also between those tribesmen recruited in the Spanish army.

Whoever stands in the way of the Spaniards risked the death penalty. Many inhabitants were compelled to join the Spanish army, which provided a uniform and guns as symbols of power. As a result, Spain occupied the Bouarek plain and the region between Azghenghen and Elhociema, in addition to Nador and Selouan. Nevertheless, the Imjahden were able to inflict many defeats on the Spanish army.

=== Ameziane's retreat ===
Under these conditions Mohamed Ameziane retreated to Aitbouifrour and established a new stronghold in Souq Aljouma in Amaworo. Confrontations abated in late 1909 to 1911, while he kept refusing all offers by Spain.

After he refused huge sums of money while the protectorate was negotiated, he was suggested as the representative of Spain for the Moroccan Sultan, which he declined.

== Final battles and death ==
Confrontations between the resistance and Spanish forces renewed when the resistance raided on group of soldiers which escorted a Spanish topographic expedition. The most important battles took place around the Kert river.

After General Ardonit was killed in September 1911, sporadic clashes continued until 14 May 1912. Spies watched the movement of Ameziane and 700 Imjahden fighters towards the Bani Sidal tribe, until he stopped in Tawrirt Kdiya's mosque, then Spanish forces were informed and rushed to besiege him.

After being made aware, he prayed Al-Fajr and gave a choice to his companions to either fight and die as martyrs or withdraw.

He was killed on 15 May 1912 in the vicinity of Kaddur. Jaime Samaniego y Martínez-Fortún, a Spanish lieutenant recently incorporated to the Regulares, also died in the exchange of shots. Following the death of their leader, the rest of the members of the Riffian harka present in the area surrendered upon the arrival of General Moltó.

Ameziane was wearing a blue robe with a brown jillaba and two silk shirts, carrying a sigil with his name, a scapular, a small edition of the Quran, a handkerchief, a Mauser and a Browning, and plenty of ammunition. The corpse was moved to the Ulad Ganen, where he was positively identified by a number of Spanish and Riffians, who had met him in person in the past. The corpse was respectfully transported to the mosque of Segangan, where he was buried next to his people. Future rebel leader Abd el-Krim watched the body and wrote a letter to his father describing it.
