= Abdelkader Hach Tieb =

Riffian tribal leader

Qaid Abd el-Kader Tieb
- ⴰⴱⴷⴻⵍⴽⴰⴷⴻⵔ ⵃⴰⵛⵀ ⵟⵉⴻⴱ (Tarifit)
- Born: Abd el-Kader Belhadj Tieb c. 1870
- Died: 9 December 1950
- Occupation: Qaïd of the Bni Chiker

Abd el-Kader Belhadj Tieb (c. 1870 – 1950) was a Riffian tribal leader, caïd of the Bni Chiker, in northeastern Morocco.

He was born about 1870. He led the Riffian actions against the advances of Spain into the Cape Three Forks during the 1909 Second Melillan campaign. Following the Riffian defeat at the battle of Taxdirt by the forces led by José Cavalcanti on 20 September 1909, he befriended from then on the Spanish administration, pledging his services to José Marina Vega in December 1909. His tribe, the Bni Chiker, was the only one that stood loyal to Spain after the 1921 battle of Annual (when Melilla stood most defenseless), and he even recruited forces to create a friendly harka. He died on 9 December 1950. Since 18 December 1950, nine days after his death, a street of Melilla is named after him.
