= Francisco Goñi =

Spanish photographer

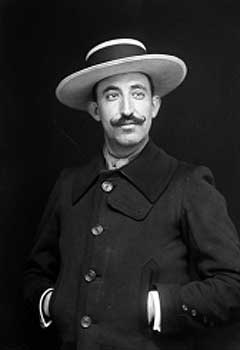
- Goñi c. 1900
- Born: Francisco Goñi y Soler; 1873; Madrid, Kingdom of Spain
- Died: 6 December 1936 (aged 62–63); Guadalajara, Spanish Republic
- Cause of death: Assassination
- Occupations: Photographer, photojournalist

Francisco Goñi y Soler (1873 – 6 December 1936) was a Spanish photographer and photojournalist.

== Biography ==
Born in Madrid in 1873, his photographs appeared in publications such as Blanco y Negro, ABC, El Grafico, News, Nuevo Mundo, Mundo Gráfico or La Esfera, among others.

He was one of the photojournalists who would accompany King Alfonso XIII on his travels. Despite his dedication to the realm of royalty, he also made portraits, as well as took photos of religious, political and bullfighting events, even being sent as a correspondent to the Melilla War.

He was assassinated during the Spanish Civil War on 6 December 1936 in the Guadalajara prison as a result of his pro-monarchist views.

== Gallery ==
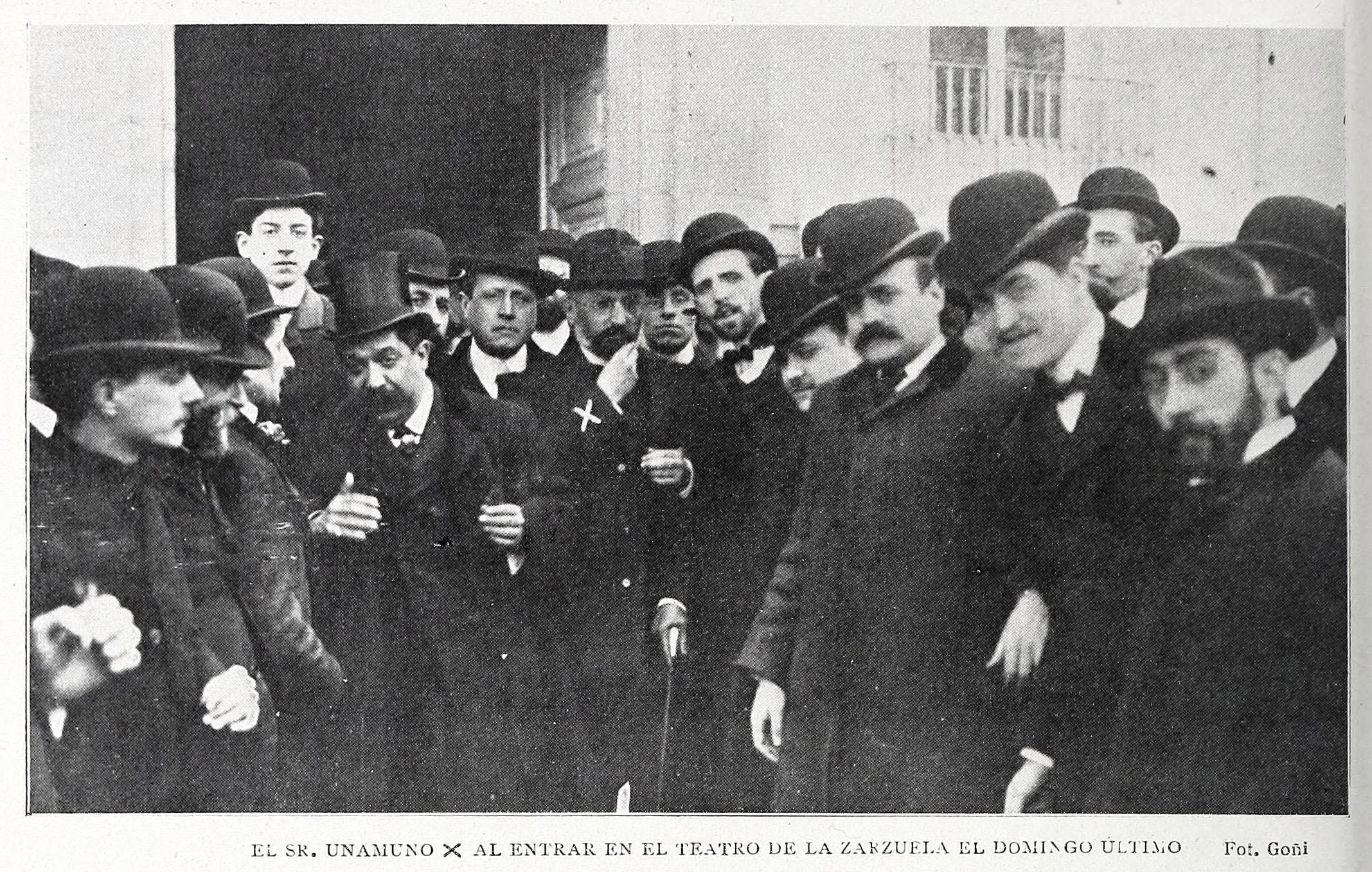
Miguel de Unamuno giving a speech.

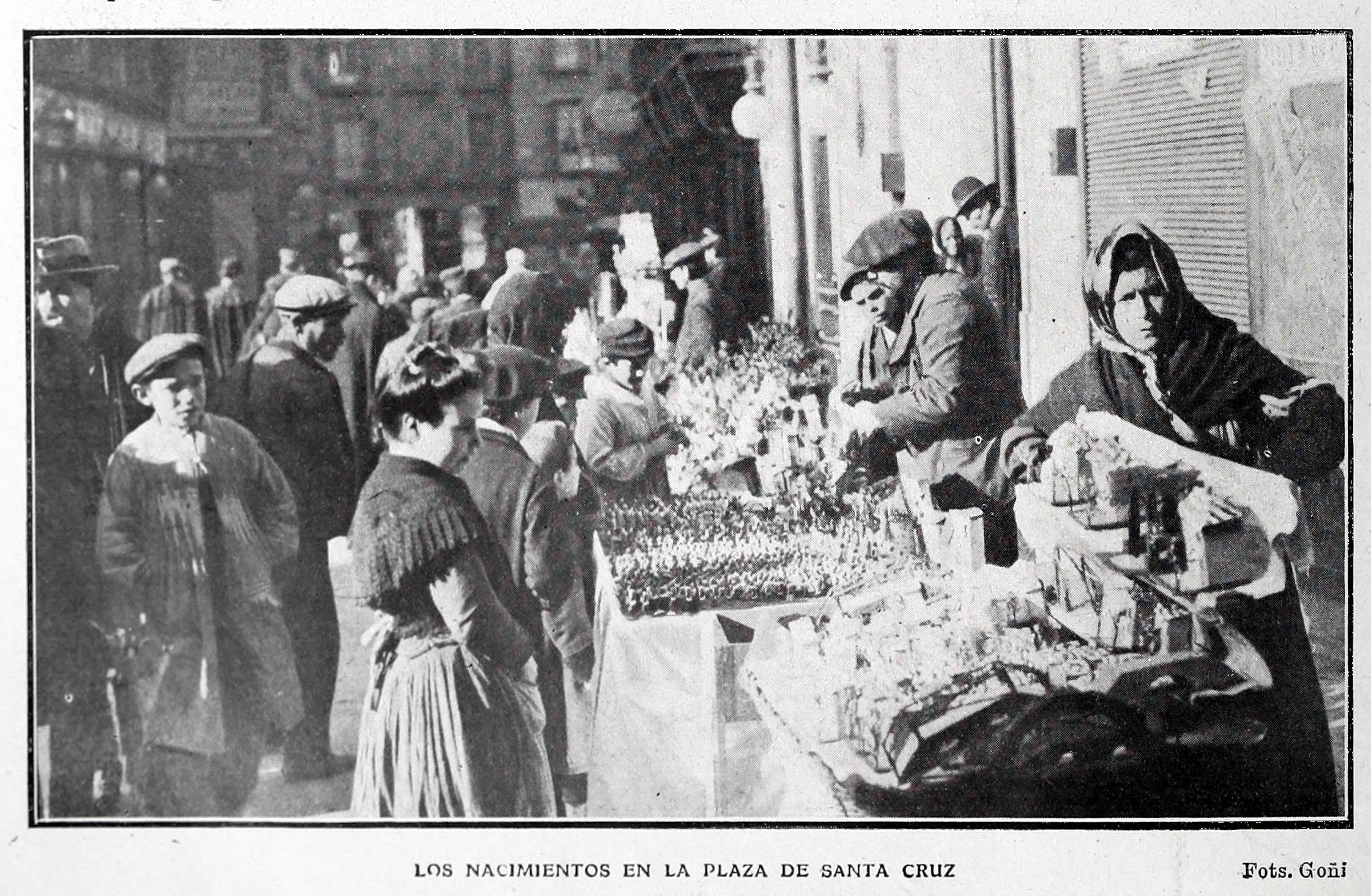
Street trade on Easter.

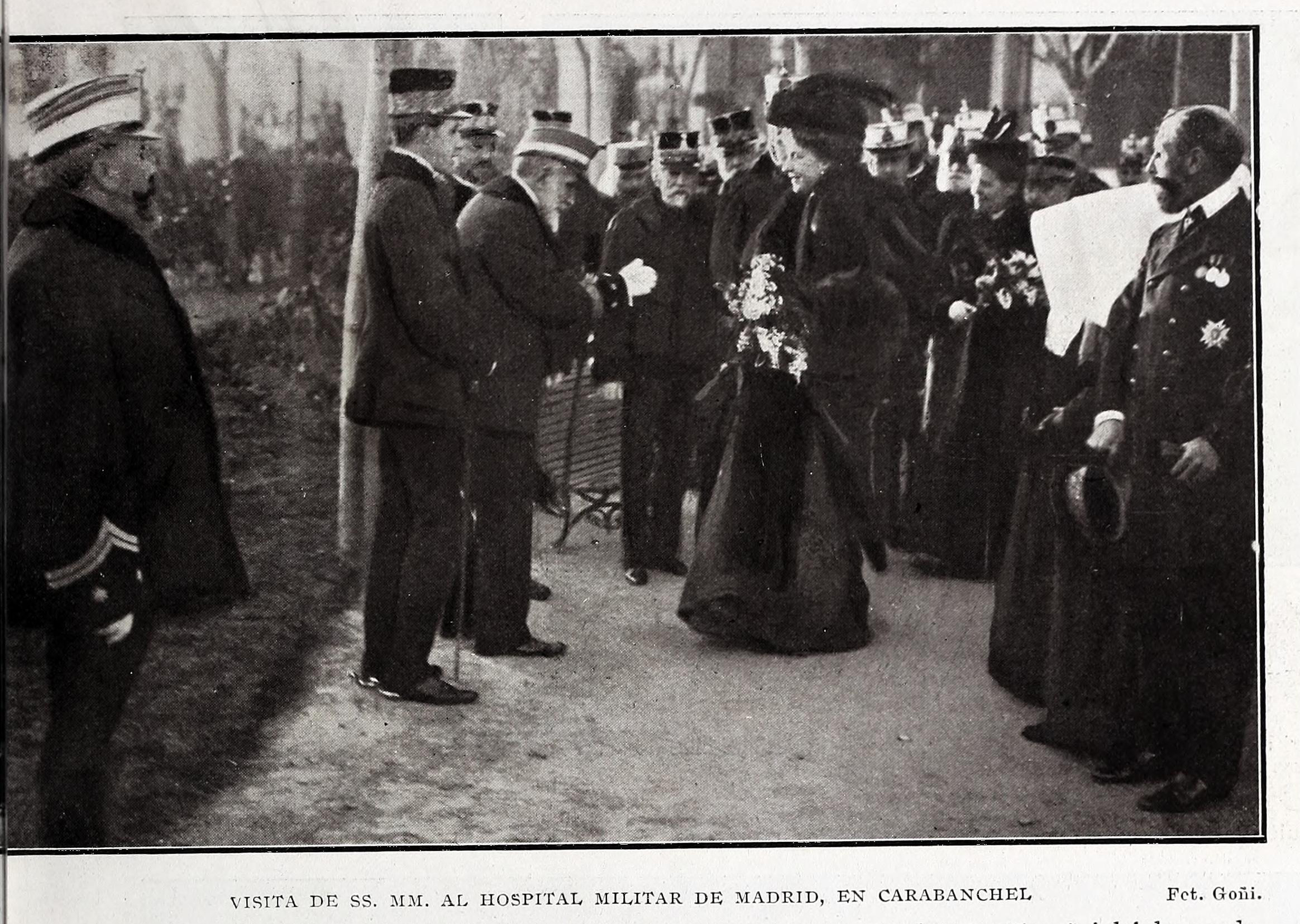
Visit of their Majesties to the Military Hospital of Madrid, in Carabanchel.

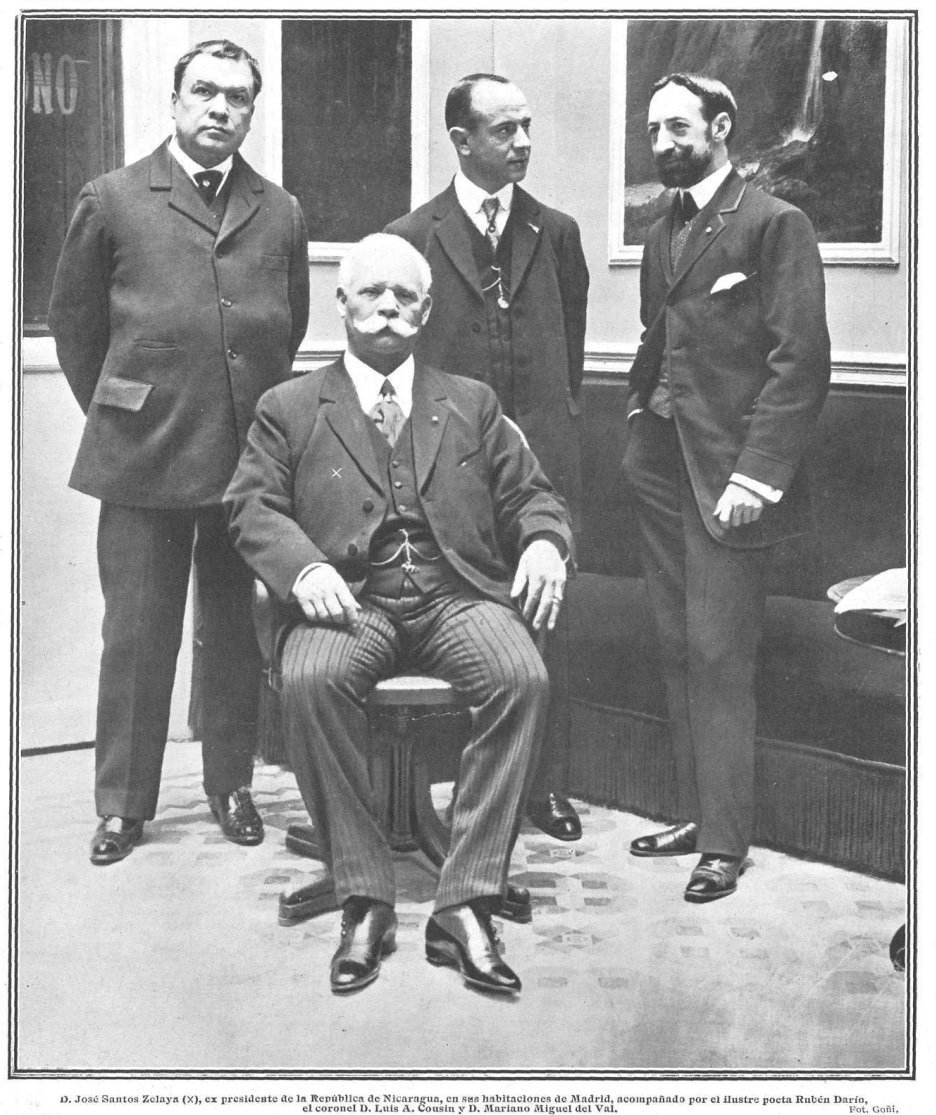
José Santos Zelaya, former president of Nicaragua, in his room in Madrid, with Rubén Darío, Luis Cousin and Miguel del Val.
