= Segangan =

Coordinates: 35°09′N 3°00′W

Zeghanghane أزغنغان ⴰⵣⴴⵏⴴⴰⵏ
- Town
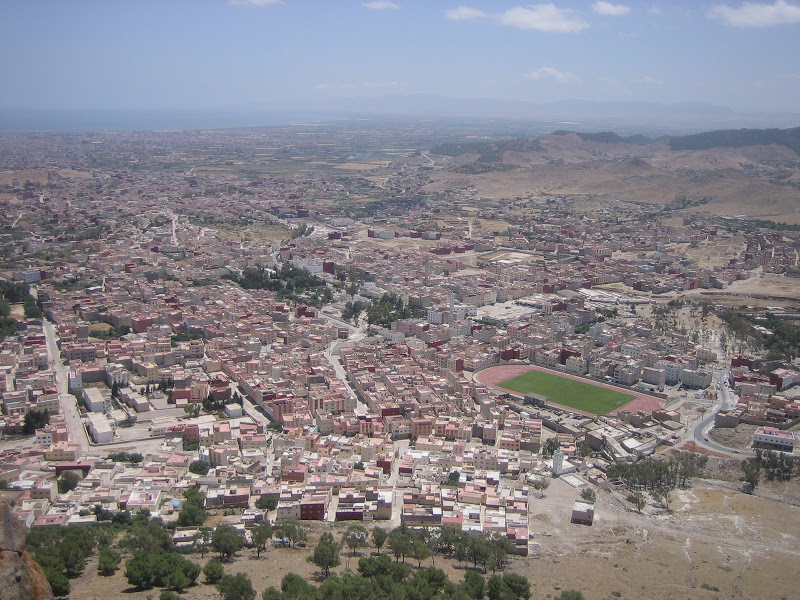
- Interactive map of Zeghanghane
- Country: Morocco
- Region: Oriental
- Province: Nador

Area
  - Total: 9.683 km^{2} (3.739 sq mi)

Population (2024)
  - Total: 31.431
  - Density: 3.246/km^{2} (8.41/sq mi)
- Time zone: UTC+0 (GMT)
- Postal code: 62650

Segangan, also known as Zeghanghane (Tarifit: ⴰⵣⴴⵏⴴⴰⵏ; Arabic: أزغنغان), is a town and municipality in the province of Nador, Oriental, Morocco. It is one of the major towns of the province. According to the 2024 census, its population was 31,431.

== History ==
Segangan is one of the earliest settlements known in the eastern region of Rif. Segangan played a big role in all of the Spanish invasion wars in the region starting with the first Rif War (1893). The second Rif War (1909) actually started from Segangan under the leadership of a local figure Cherif Mohammed Ameziane. The town also witnessed and played part in the last Rif War (1921-1926) and was part of the Rif Republic till the collapse of the latter in 1926.

== Etymology ==
The name “Segangan” or “Azghanghane” is derived from a corruption of “Azghar n ghan,” which translates to “wild cow plain” in Berber.
