= Salvador Díaz Ordóñez =

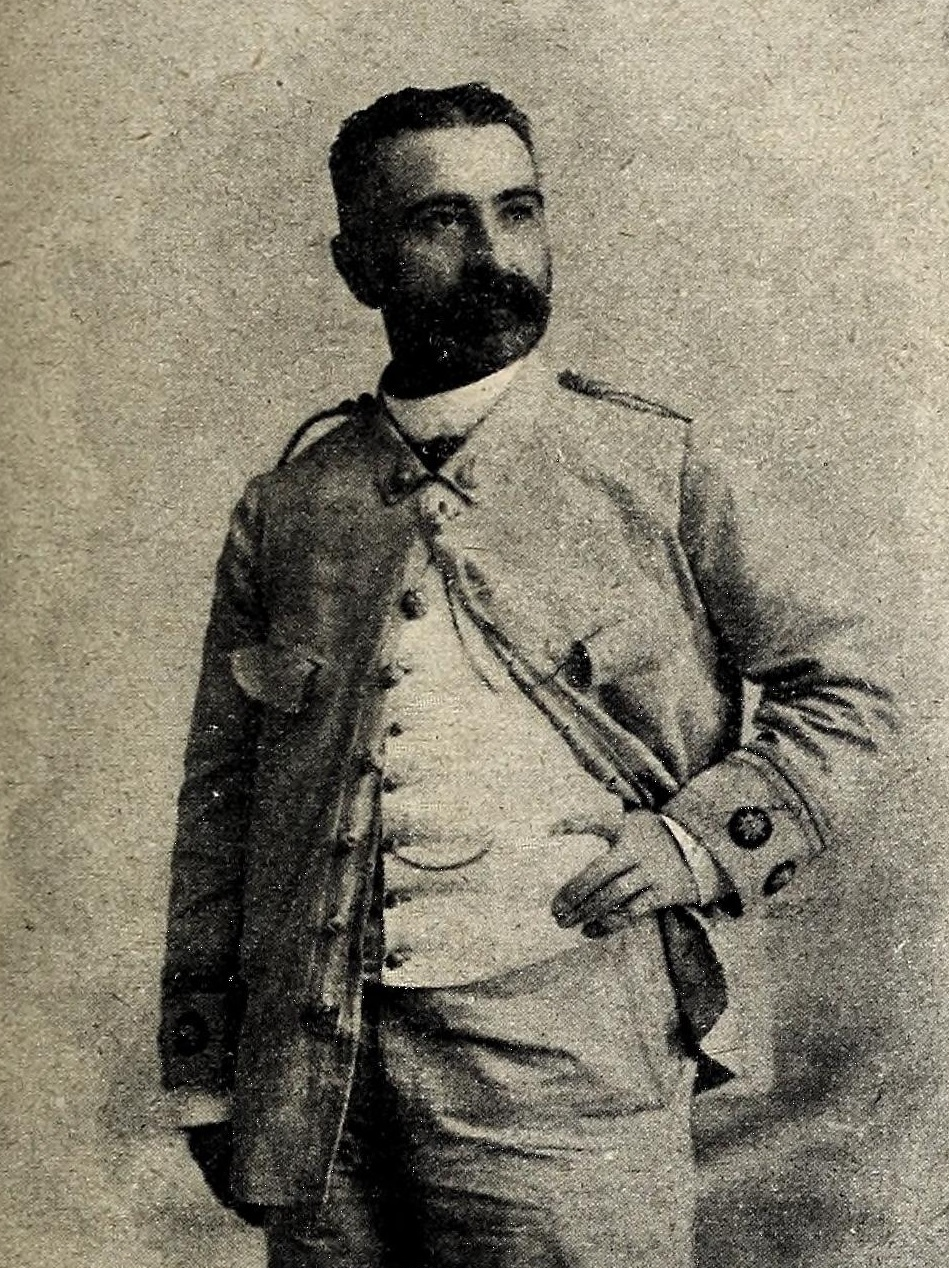
Portrait published in 1898

Salvador Díaz Ordóñez y Escandón (1845–1911) was an artillery officer in the Spanish Army and the designer of several pieces of artillery, the Ordóñez guns. As a colonel, Ordóñez served in Cuba during the Spanish–American War, where he was wounded at Santiago de Cuba. He went on to reach the rank of General. He died on 14 October 1911 at Izhaven, near Melilla, from shots from a Rifian while inspecting the Spanish position there during the Kert campaign.

== Life ==
Salvador Diaz Ordóñez was born in Oviedo on 15 March 1845. In December 1859 he entered the Military College at Segovia, and completed his studies in January 1866.

At graduation he received an appointment as a first lieutenant of artillery. He then served in several regiments, distinguishing himself in the Third Carlist War (Spanish: Tercera Guerra Carlista) (1872–1876).

In 1879 he was appointed to the Royal Ordnance Works at Trubia. At Trubia he was in charge of the Gun Factory, where he studied explosives and the construction of artillery. In 1881 he designed a 150mm gun that the factory then produced for installation throughout Spain and in its colonies. In 1884 Ordóñez received a promotion to major, which took him away from Trubia.

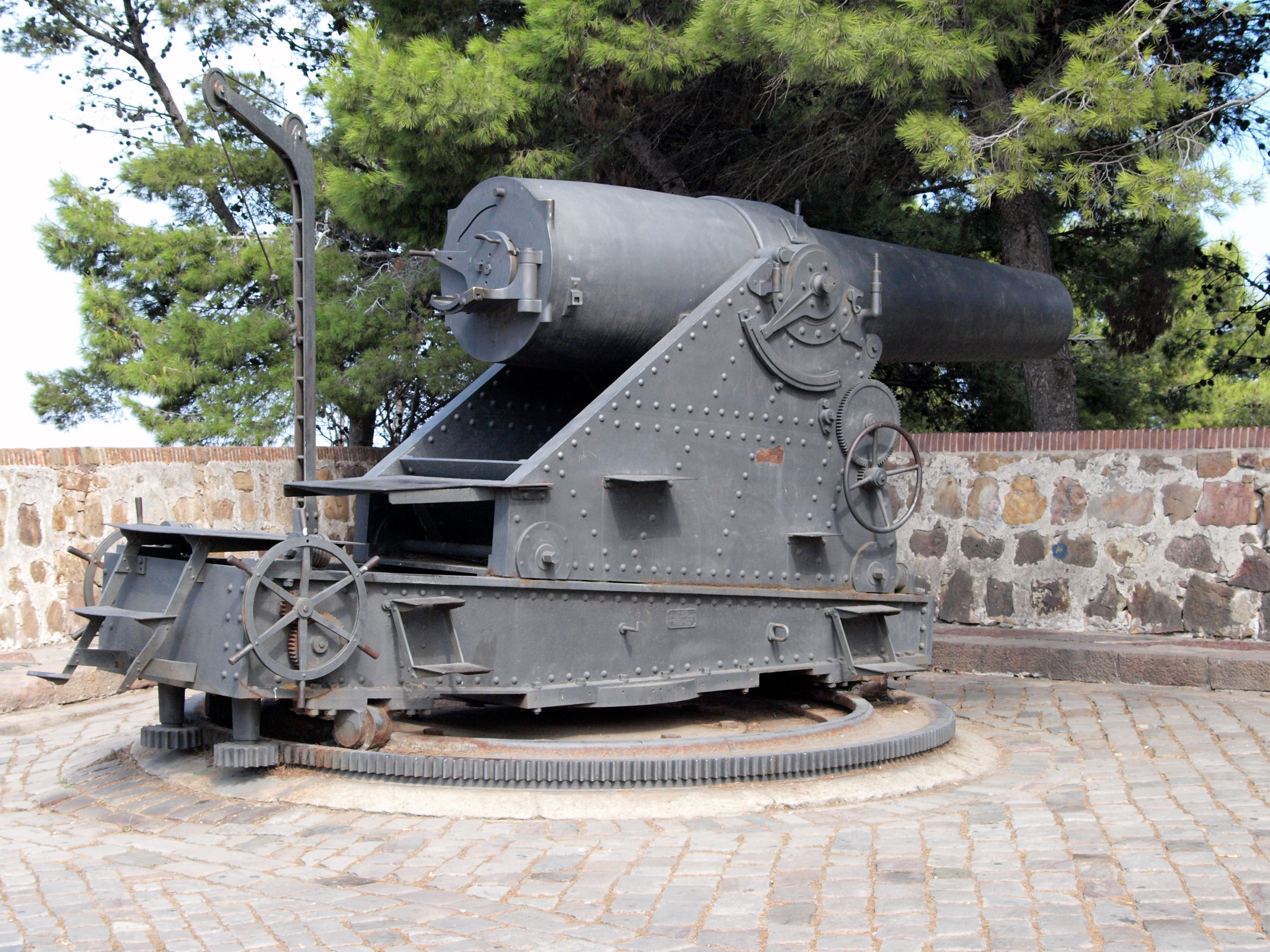
305mm Ordóñez howitzer at the fortress on top of Montjuic, Barcelona

Ordóñez returned to Trubia in 1887 and resumed designing coastal artillery and howitzers of 210mm (8.27), 240mm (9.45") and 305mm (12") calibre. A US Naval Intelligence report from 1892 described the Ordóñez guns as being less powerful than most other modern guns of equal calibers, but also much cheaper (because they were of iron rather than entirely steel). The Ordóñez guns saw extremely limited combat service at Havana, Manilla, and San Juan during the Spanish–American War, and at Subic Bay during the Philippine–American War.

In 1890 Ordóñez received a promotion to lieutenant colonel. He remained at Trubia until April 1895, when at his request he transferred to Cuba. In Cuba he served as commander of the artillery and conducted a number of technical commissions.

During the Spanish–American War he commanded a two-gun battery at the battle of El Caney on 1 July 1898, where he was wounded in action. This led to his promotion to brigadier general.

On his return to Spain, Ordóñez was placed in command of the artillery in several military districts, notably in Madrid. He was also appointed President of the Technical Committee of Artillery and given command of the Citadel of San Pedro in Jaca. Ordóñez maintained his interest in artillery matters and worked on designs for a new 240mm gun and howitzer.

In 1908 he was promoted to major general and was appointed Military Governor of Cartagena. Then in May 1910 he became commander of the division in Melilla. After war with the Moroccans broke out in September 1911 (the Kert campaign), he was frequently at the front on the River Kert, which is about 20 miles east of Melilla.

He was successful in battles at Izmafen and Izmarufen (or Yamarufen), two days earlier, but on 14 October at Izmafen he took two bullets to the chest as he mounted his horse to conduct an inspection on the front lines. He died as he was being transported back to the nearest station of a railway line serving the Spanish mines in the area.

General Ordóñez wrote a number of technical monographs during his years of service. He was elected to membership of the Iron and Steel Institute in 1887.

== Family ==
General Ordóñez never married. He was survived by two brothers living in Oviedo.

== See also ==
- Ordóñez guns
