= José Marina Vega =

Spanish military officer and politician

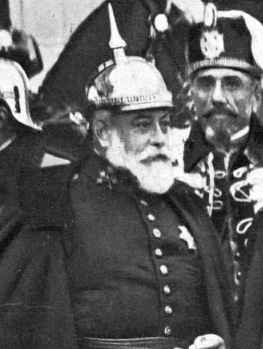
- Photographed by Goñi in 1910 in Madrid

High Commissioner of Spain in Morocco
- In office 17 August 1913 – 9 July 1915
- Monarch: Alfonso XIII
- Prime Minister: Count of Romanones; Eduardo Dato
- Minister of State: Antonio López Muñoz; Duke of Ripalda
- Preceded by: Felipe Alfau Mendoza
- Succeeded by: Francisco Gómez Jordana

Minister of War of Spain
- In office 18 October – 3 November 1917
- Monarch: Alfonso XIII
- Prime Minister: Eduardo Dato
- Preceded by: Fernando Primo de Rivera
- Succeeded by: Juan de la Cierva y Peñafiel
- In office 22 March – 9 November 1918
- Monarch: Alfonso XIII
- Prime Minister: Antonio Maura
- Preceded by: Juan de la Cierva y Peñafiel
- Succeeded by: Dámaso Berenguer

Senator of the Kingdom
- In office 1919–1923

Personal details
- Born: 13 April 1850 Figueres, Spain
- Died: 30 January 1926 (aged 75) Madrid, Spain
- Occupation: Military officer, politician

Military service
- Allegiance: Kingdom of Spain
- Branch/service: Spanish Army
- Years of service: 1863–1915
- Rank: Lieutenant General
- Battles/wars: Third Carlist War; Second Melillan campaign

José Marina Vega (13 April 1850 – 30 January 1926) was a Spanish military officer and politician. Leader of the military operations in Melilla during the 1909 Melilla Campaign, he later served as High Commissioner of Spain in Morocco (1913–1915) and as Minister of War (1917 and 1918).

== Biography ==
Born on 13 April 1850 in Figueres, province of Girona, he is sometimes reported to be born in 1848, as his father (a captain of the Spanish Armed Forces) declared him to be 2 years older in his application to the military. He moved as child to Luzon (Philippines). Returned to Peninsular Spain, he joined the Battalion of Hunters Llerena as cadet in 1863.

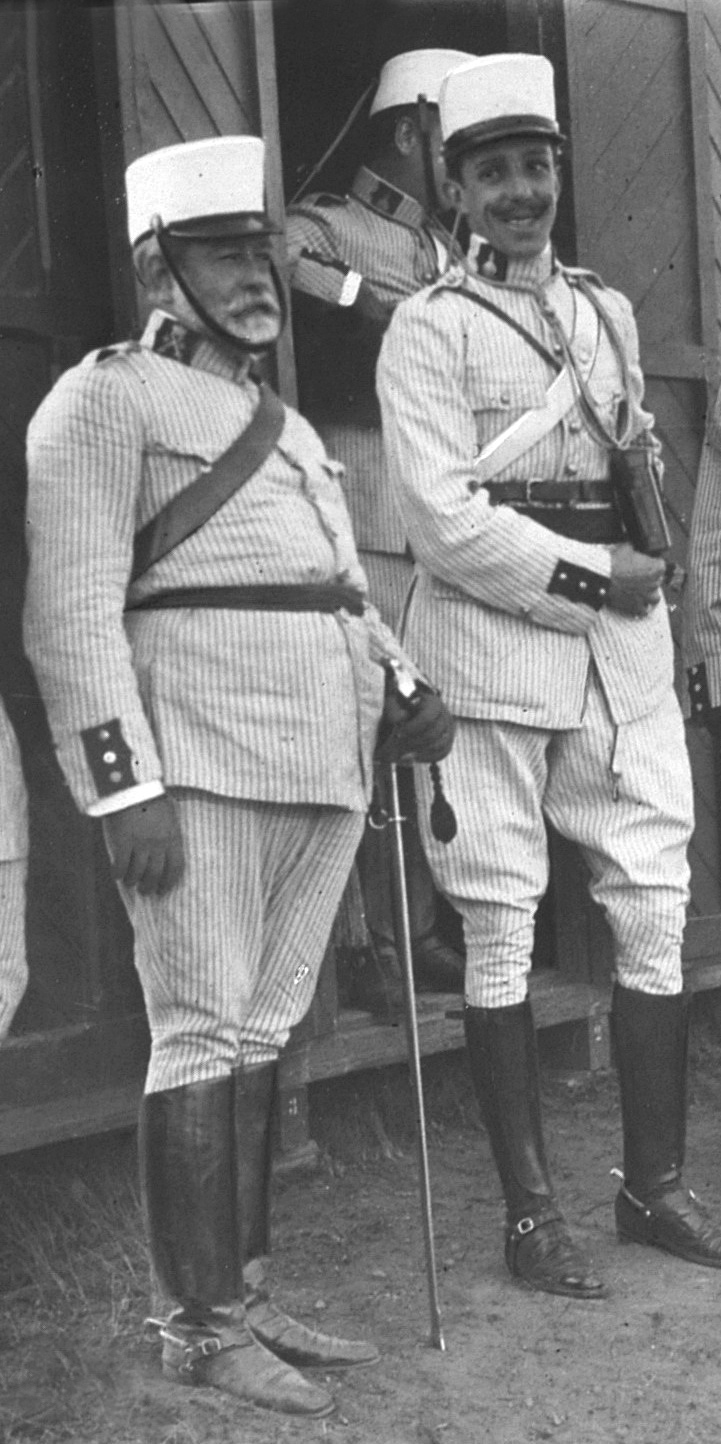
Marina and Alfonso XIII, circa 1909.

He fought in the Third Carlist War. With a military career in infantry, and promoted to colonel in 1893, Marina was destined to places such as Philippines and Cuba. He was promoted to the rank of brigader general in 1896. He was promoted to divisional general in July 1900. Following a brief spell as civil governor in Barcelona (1899), he was destined to Melilla in 1905.

At the helm of the military in the North African city, Marina Vega commanded the operations in the Melilla hinterland in retaliation to the attacks of Riffian tribesmen during the so-called Melilla War, including the Desastre del Barranco del Lobo in July 1909, that, taking place simultaneously with the Tragic Week riots in Barcelona, prompted a dismay in the Spanish public opinion. He was promoted then to Lieutenant general.

Appointed as High Commissioner of Spain in Morocco in replacement of Felipe Alfau Mendoza, he served from 1913 to 1915.

He served two times as Minister of War (1917 and 1918) in cabinets presided by Eduardo Dato and Antonio Maura. Appointed as senator for life in 1919, he died on 30 January 1926 in Madrid (Calle de Zurbano, 6).

Political offices
Preceded by Ramón de Larroca y Pascual	Civil Governor of the Province of Barcelona; 1899	Succeeded by Eduardo Sanz y Escartín
Preceded by Felipe Alfau Mendoza	High Commissioner of Spain in Morocco; 1913–1915	Succeeded by Francisco Gómez Jordana [es]
Preceded by Fernando Primo de Rivera	Minister of War; 1917	Succeeded by Juan de la Cierva y Peñafiel
Preceded by Juan de la Cierva y Peñafiel	Minister of War; 1918	Succeeded by Dámaso Berenguer
