= Harka (Maghreb) =

Harka (Maghrebi Arabic: حَرْكة) in Maghrebi history refers to a military campaign with military, political, or financial (tax-collecting) goals, often a punitive expedition against insurgents.

In the history of Morocco, harka refers to military campaigns carried out by the sultans of Morocco or other high-ranking officials, such as qaids, with the goal of collecting taxes or pacifying or suppressing revolting regions or tribes (as in Bled es-Siba). Walter Burton Harris described a harka in the time of Sultan Abdelaziz in Morocco That Was, although he confused it with the word harqa (حرقة) related to burning.

== See also ==
- Mahalla
- Harki – Term for Muslim Algerians in the French Army in the Algerian War of Independence
