= Tragic Week (Spain) =

Social revolt

- Part of the Second Rif War
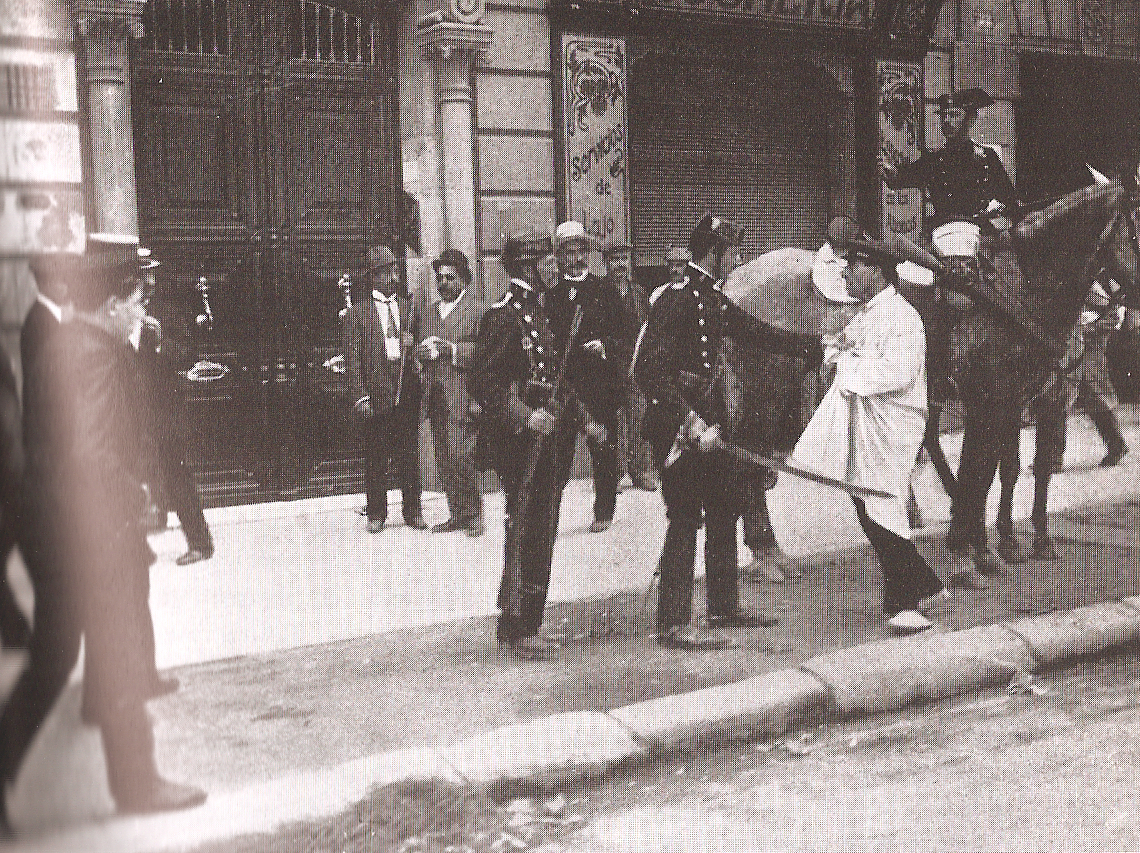
- Suspects rounded up by the Civil Guard.
- Date: 26 July – 2 August 1909
- Location: Barcelona
- Caused by: Opposition to conscription and the Second Rif War; Antimilitarism; Anti-clericalism
- Methods: Rioting, strikes, barricades, arson and murder

Parties
Anarchists; Socialists; Republicans	Spanish Army; Civil Guard

Casualties and losses
- Arrests: 1,700; Injuries: 441; Deaths: 104 to 150 civilians and 8 military. Five further civilians were executed after the riots.

The Tragic Week (in Catalan la Setmana Tràgica, in Spanish la Semana Trágica) (25 July – 2 August 1909) was a series of violent confrontations between the Spanish army and anarchists, freemasons, socialists and republicans of Barcelona and other cities in Catalonia, Spain, during the last week of July 1909. It was caused by the calling-up of reserve troops by Premier Antonio Maura to be sent as reinforcements when Spain renewed military-colonial activity in Morocco on 9 July, in what is known as the Second Rif War. Many of these reservists were the only breadwinners for their families, while the wealthy were able to hire substitutes. The figureheads most associated with the unrest were Alejandro Lerroux and Francisco Ferrer.

== Background ==
The incident began when a party of conscripts, destined for Morocco, boarded ships owned by the marquess of Comillas, a prominent Catholic industrialist. The conscripts were the subject of patriotic addresses, the playing of the Royal March, and the distribution of religious medals by well dressed ladies. The conscripts remained silent but many of the onlookers jeered and whistled, and emblems of the Sacred Heart were thrown into the sea.

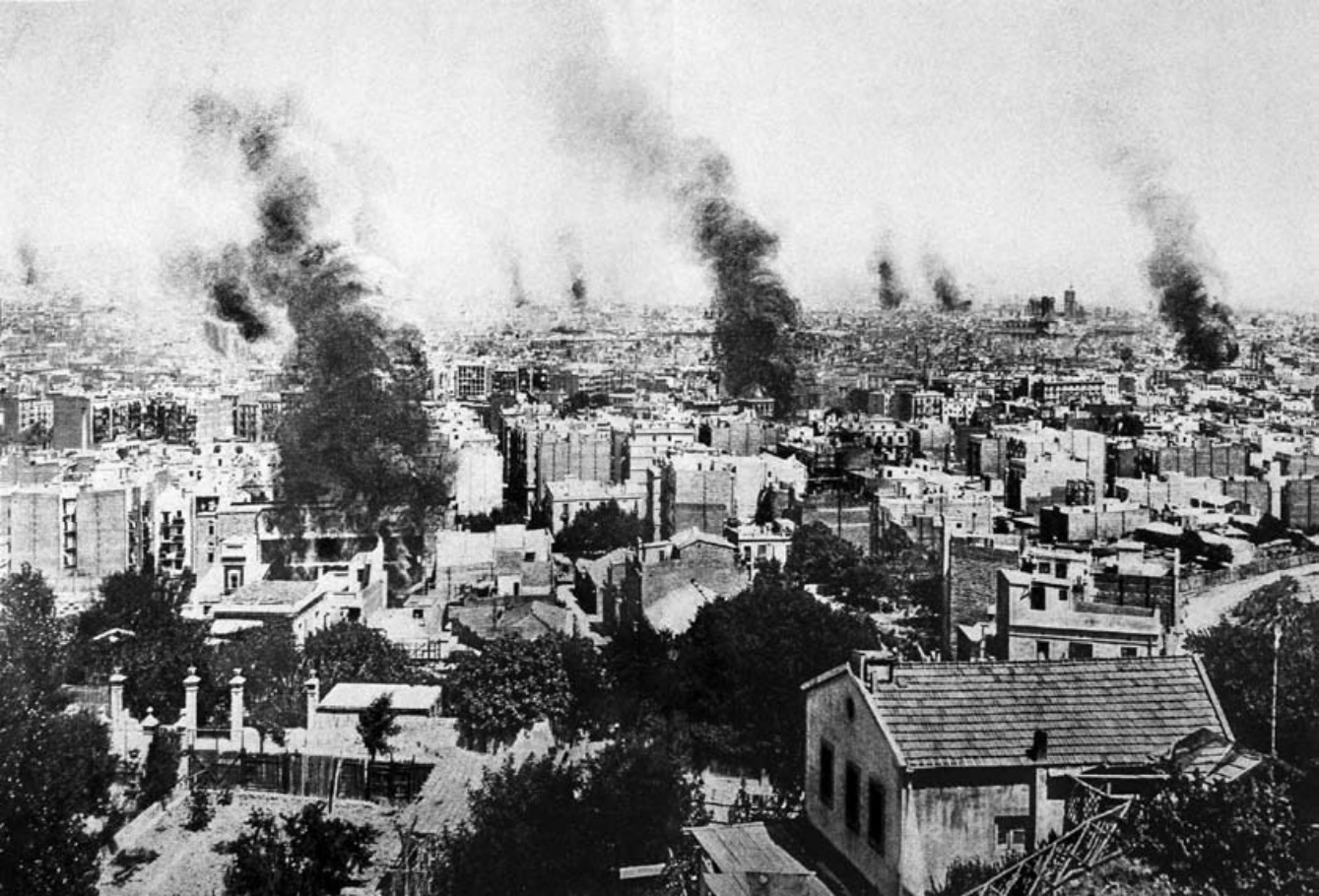
Barcelona during the Tragic Week.

== Outbreak ==
By Tuesday, workers had occupied much of central Barcelona, halting troop trains and overturning trams. By Thursday, there was street fighting, with a general eruption of riots, strikes, and the burning of convents. Many of the rioters were antimilitarist, anticolonial and anticlerical. The rioters considered the Roman Catholic Church a part of the corrupt middle and upper class whose sons did not have to go to war, and much public opinion had been turned against the Church by anarchist elements within the city. Thus, not only were convents burned, but sepulchers were profaned and graves were emptied.

== Sources ==
- (in English) Carolyn P. Boyd, Praetorian Politics in Liberal Spain, The Library of Iberian Resources Online
- (in English) Ullman, Joan Connelly. The Tragic Week: A Study of Anticlericalism in Spain, 1875–1912. Cambridge: Harvard University Press, 1968.
- Andreu Martín: Barcelona Trágica (Ediciones B, 2009 -castellano-); (Edicions Ara, 2009 -catalán-)
