= Mount Gurugu =

Mountain in Morocco

Coordinates: 35°13′15″N 2°59′48″W

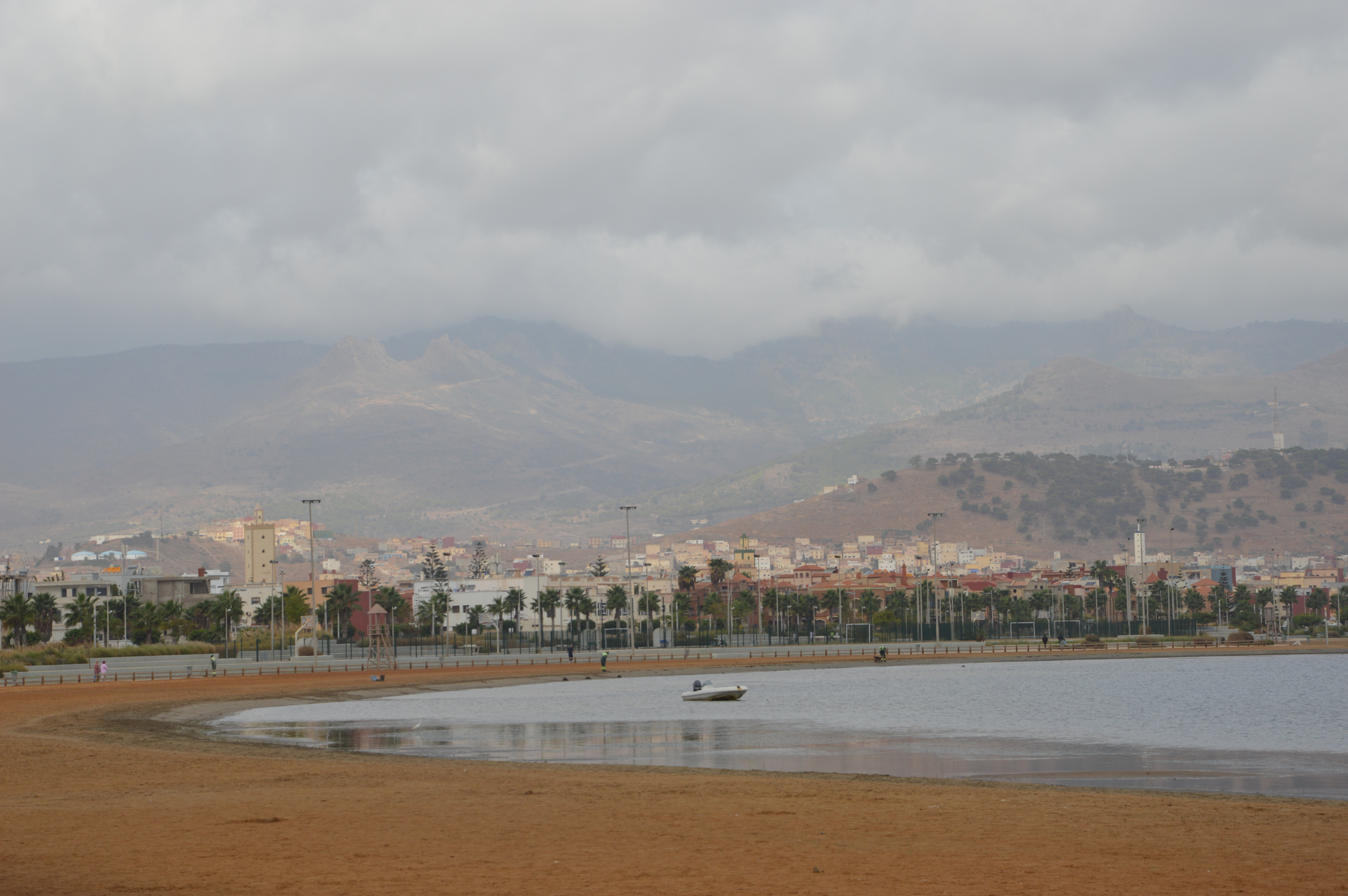
Gourougou mountain seen from Marchica beach

Mount Gurugu (Tarifit: Adrar n Gurugu, Arabic: جبل غروغو) is a rural area in Morocco located almost entirely in the town of Bni Chiker near the province of Nador.

The mountain is densely populated, with no proper census having been done within the area, rather relying on the amount of houses visible. The mountain's main resources exist out of agricultural products such as animal herding or crops.

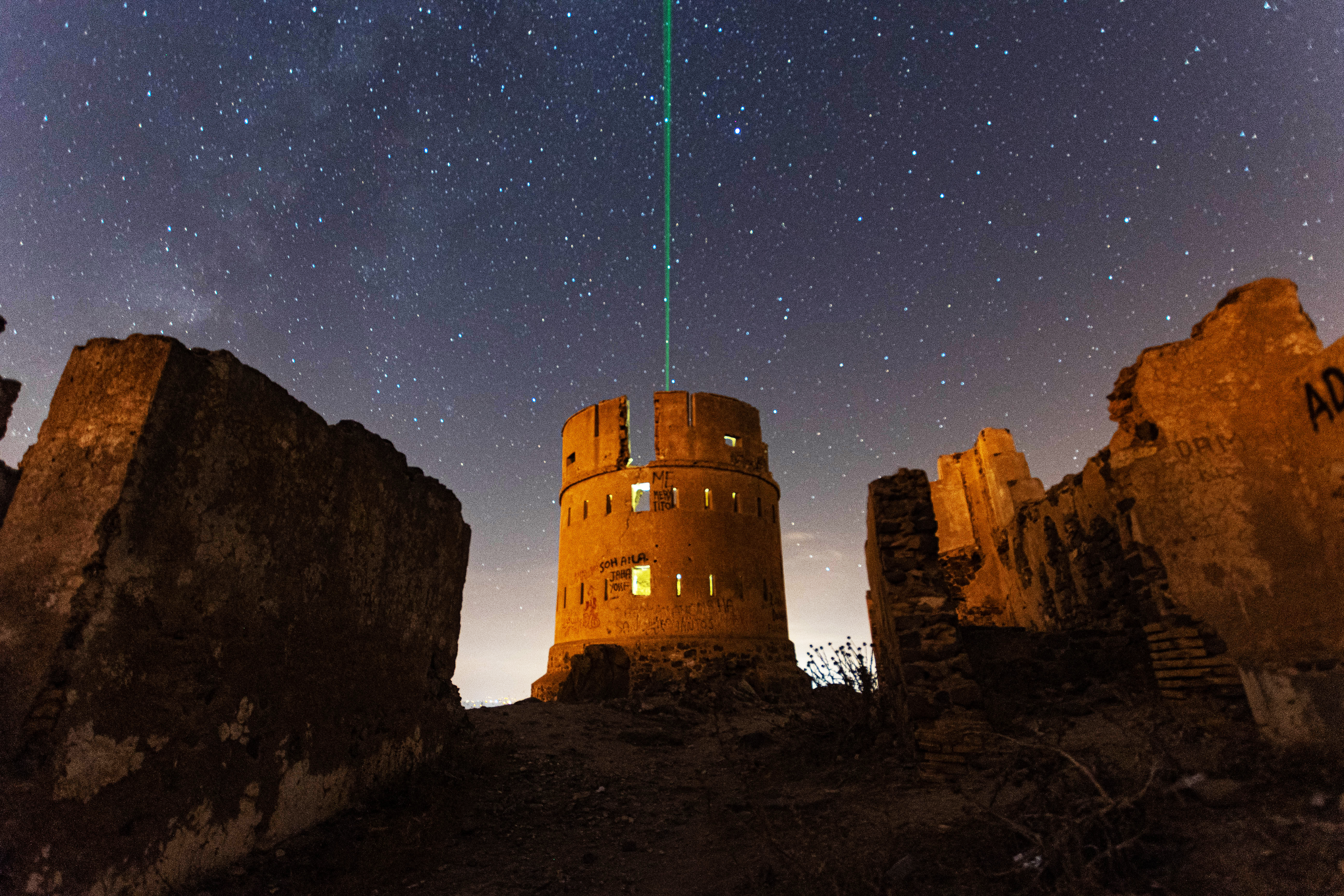
Castle of Tazuda, located on Gurugu

The mountain has many tourist spots such as castles and mosques like Madjid Azameen, a mosque located near the center of the mountain.

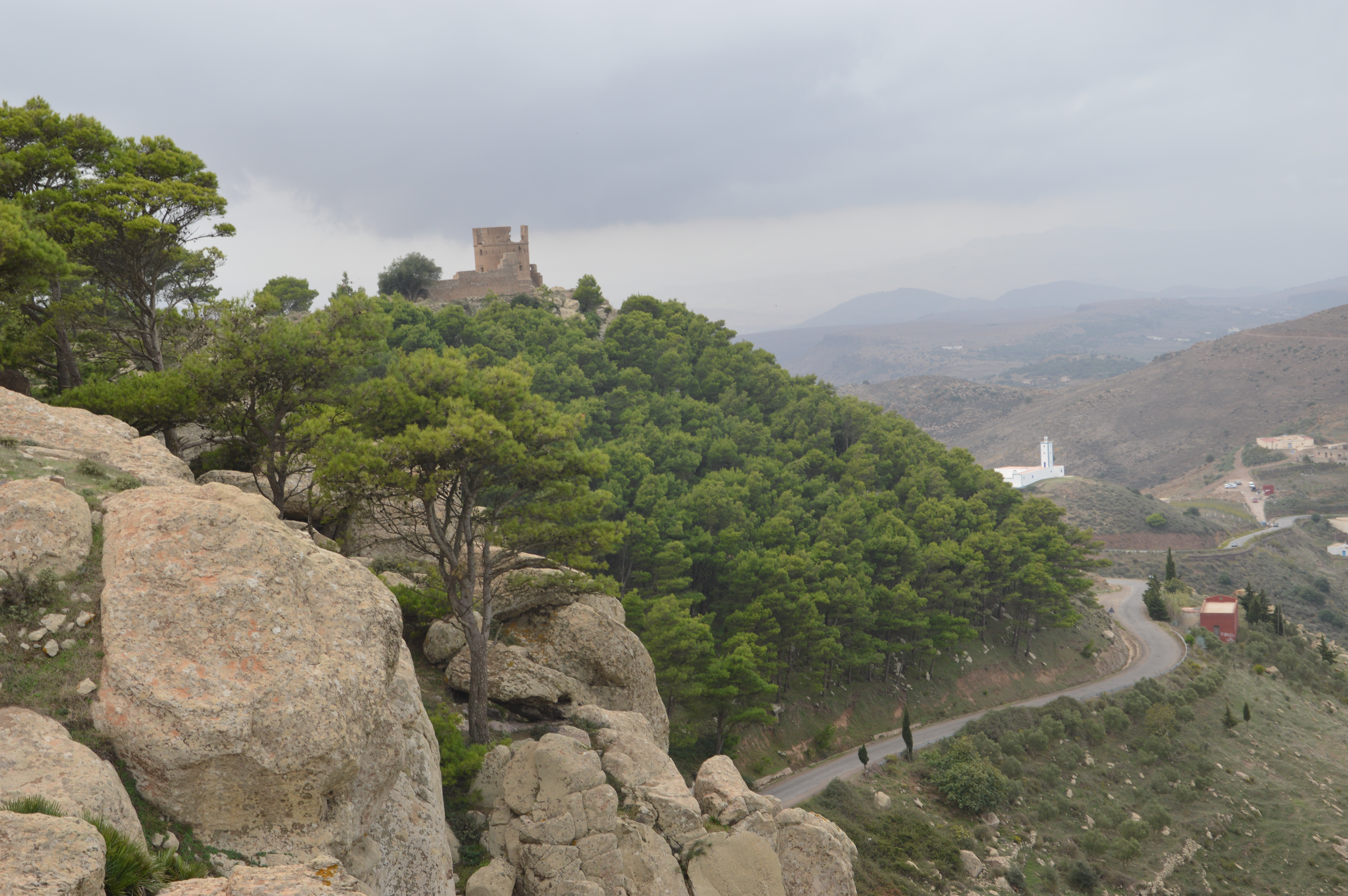
Thazuda Castle and Mosque Arrahmane in Gourougou mountain

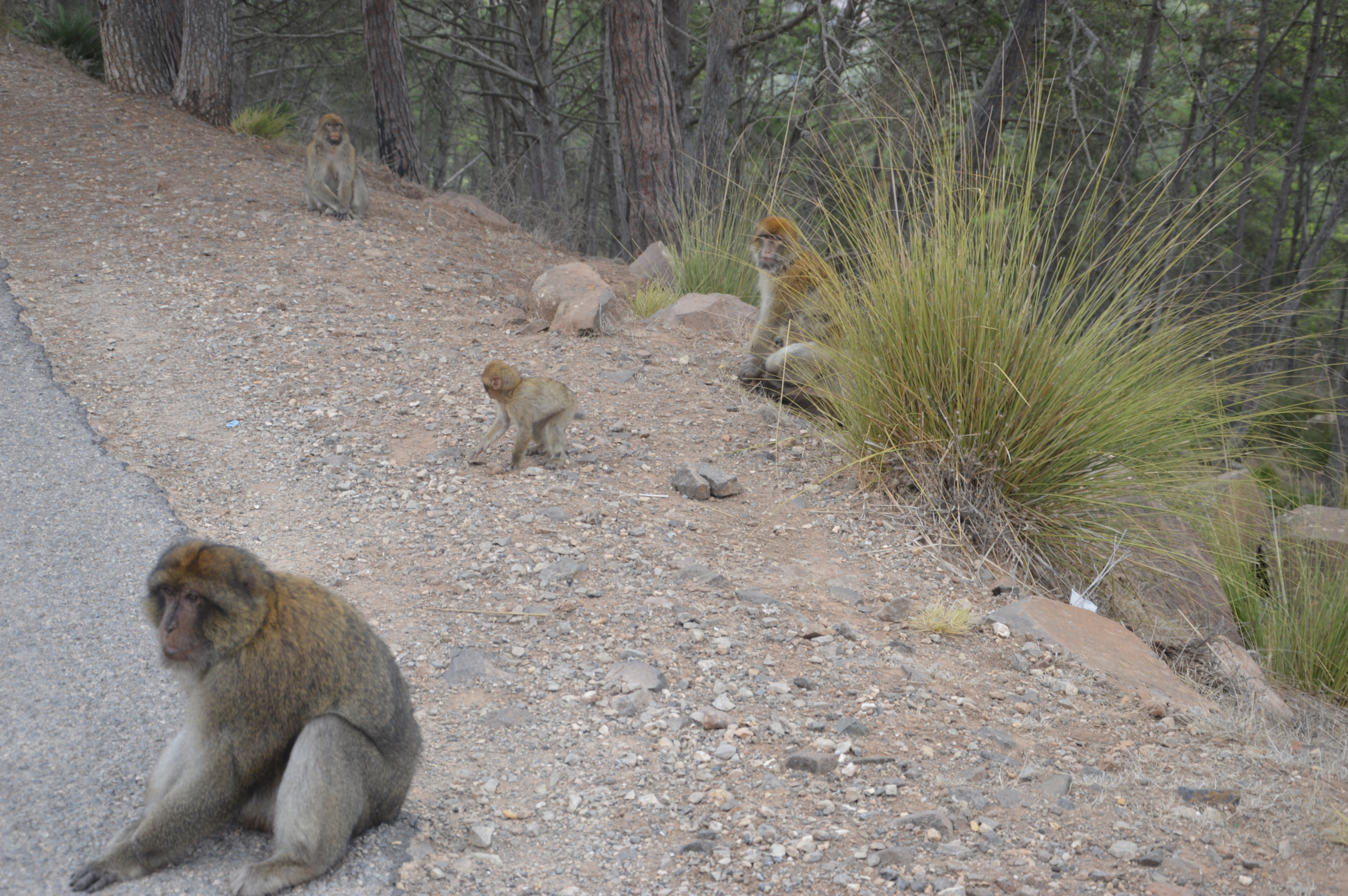
Monkeys in Gourougou mountain

The mountain has a max height of around 900 metres, and is located in the Rif region of Morocco.

== History ==
The Battle of Annual was fought partially on the mountain, as its height offered a strategic advantage against planes and cavalry troops down below.

The mountain's height also provided strategic advantage to scouts and generals because it was much easier to mark enemy troop positions from a high point without being seen.

The castles that were mentioned before show that the mountain was already properly inhabited during the middle ages.

The mountain throughout history offered a strategic advantage due to its height and relatively low population and thus, played a part during the Rif War.

In 2005, the affair of the illegal immigrants from sub-Saharan Africa received a lot of media coverage when dozens of illegal immigrants crossed the border of Melilla (Spanish enclave) via Morocco, climbing the barriers using ladders. Barracks were set up in Beni chiker near Gourougou and the Melilla border to deter illegal immigrants from resettling there.

== See also ==
- Nador
- Berbers
- Bni Chiker
- Morocco
- Rif
