= Serengdongrub =

Chinese Inner Mongolian politician (1894–1980)

Serendongrub
- ᠰᠡᠷᠡᠩᠳᠣᠩᠷᠣᠪ
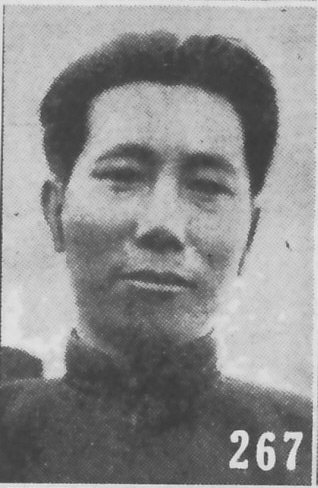
- Serengdongrub as pictured in The Most Recent Biographies of Chinese Dignitaries

Chairman of the Mongolian and Tibetan Affairs Commission
- In office 26 November 1948 – 6 June 1949
- Preceded by: Xu Shiying
- Succeeded by: Guan Jiyu

Personal details
- Born: 17 February 1894 Harqin Middle Banner, Qing dynasty
- Died: 2 August 1980 (aged 86) Taiwan
- Party: Kuomintang
- Other political affiliations: Inner Mongolian People's Revolutionary Party

Chinese name
- Traditional Chinese: 色楞棟魯布
- Simplified Chinese: 色楞栋鲁布
Transcriptions
Standard Mandarin
- Hanyu Pinyin: Sèléngdònglǔbù
- Wade–Giles: Se Leng Tung Lu Pu

Mongolian name
- Mongolian Cyrillic: Цэрэндонров
- Mongolian script: ᠰᠡᠷᠡᠩᠳᠣᠩᠷᠣᠪ

Serengdongrub (Note: Also written as Serendonrub, Serengdongrob, Serengdonrov, and Serendonrov, among others.) (Note: Mongolian: ᠰᠡᠷᠡᠩᠳᠣᠩᠷᠣᠪ, Цэрэндонров Chinese: 色楞棟魯布) (17 February 1894 – 2 August 1980), courtesy name Chü Ch'uan (Chinese: 巨川) and also known under the Chinese name of Pai Yün-t'i (Chinese: 白雲梯), was an Inner Mongolian politician in the Republic of China. An ethnic Mongol, he was a native of Harqin Middle Banner (today Ningcheng County, Chifeng).

== Names ==
In addition to his Mongolian name, Serengdongrub used the Chinese name Pai Yün-t'i (Chinese: 白雲梯; pinyin: Bái Yúntī). Some scholars read his Chinese name as a transcription of another Mongolian name Buyantai (meaning "meritorious", in Cyrillic Буянтай), and conflate references to Serengdongrub and Buyantai; however, as Christopher Atwood points, Buyantai (布彦泰) was actually another Harqin Mongol, whose Chinese name was Yu Lanzhai or Yu Lanze (??择).

== Career ==
In 1912, he entered the Mongolian and Tibetan School at Beijing under Gungsangnorbu. Afterwards he joined the Kuomintang. In 1925, he was one of the founders of the Inner Mongolian People's Revolutionary Party, along with Merse. In 1934, he became a member of the Mongol Local Autonomy Political Affairs Committee. From 1948 to 1949 he served as head of the Mongolian and Tibetan Affairs Commission. He retreated to Taiwan with the KMT, and died there in 1980.

== Bibliography ==
- Atwood, Christopher (April 2000), "Inner Mongolian Nationalism in the 1920s: A Survey of Documentary Information", Twentieth-Century China, 25 (2): 75–113, doi:10.1179/tcc.2000.25.2.75
- 薛化元 — Hsueh Hua-yuan (2005), "白雲梯", 臺灣歷史辭典 — Taiwan Historical Dictionary, Taipei: National Repository of Cultural Heritage, archived from the original on 2012-03-22
- Jamsran, L.; Bayasakh, J. (1997), Монголын төрийн тусгаар тогтнолын сэргэлт — Study on the Mongolian struggle for freedom, Mongolian Academy of Sciences, OCLC 41649537
- 最新支那要人伝 — Newest Bibliographies of Important Figures in China, 朝日新聞社 — Asahi Shimbun Company, 1941, OCLC 23310651
