= Record of the Yushu Investigation =

Record of the Yushu Investigation (Chinese: 玉树调查记), originally titled Record of the Yushu Tusi Investigation (Chinese: 玉树土司调查记), is a local history and investigation report by Republic of China geographer Zhou Xiwu on the Qinghai Yushu region and Chuanbian.

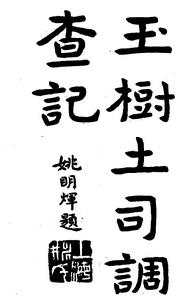
Cover of Record of the Yushu Tusi Investigation, inscribed by Yao Minghui.

== Formation ==
In November 1913, during the Simla Conference, the British representative Henry McMahon proposed the division of Inner Tibet and Outer Tibet. The Republic of China's representative, Chen Yifan, under pressure, signed the draft agreement but refused to sign the final treaty. Yin Changheng, the Chuanbian Envoy, took this opportunity to cross the border and plunder, claiming that the Longqing area of Yushu in Qinghai (present-day Nangqian) was "beyond the law" and ordered the Northern Expeditionary Forces to "forcefully demand supplies in the Longqing area, which were barely met by the local tribes," while also reporting to the Beiyang Government that "the twenty-five tribes of Longqing pledged allegiance and were willing to be governed by Sichuan." The Beiyang Government, unaware of the area's dual names, erroneously declared "Longqing belongs to Sichuan, Yushu belongs to Gansu," leading to a border dispute between Sichuan and Gansu.

Officials from various Sichuan counties echoed this and strongly advocated for expanding the Chuanbian territory. As soon as the issue arose, it was met with strong opposition from Ma Qi, the General of Xining, leading to a prolonged border dispute and ethnic conflict. The acting governor of Gansu, Zhang Binghua, supported Chuanbian, further complicating the dispute.

In response, the Beiyang Government appointed Zhou Wuxue, the Border Defense Commissioner of Gansu, and others, including Zhou Xiwu, Principal of Gansu Fourth Middle School, Liang Yaozong, Head of the Suzhou Tax Office, Wang Zhizhong, Clerk at the Border Defense Office, and surveyor Niu Zaikun as members of the investigation team. In August 1914, they set off from Lanzhou to Yushu via Xining. Upon reaching Jiegu in November, they began an intense investigation. Niu Zaikun, despite the cold and snow, traveled extensively among various tribes to map the area, while Zhou Xiwu interviewed elders and referenced maps and records. Zhou Wuxue submitted the "Report on the Yushu Boundary Survey" along with a list of the twenty-five tribes of Yushu to the Beiyang Government.

On May 9, 1915, based on the team's report, the Beiyang Government corrected its previous mistake and decided that Yushu would remain under Gansu's jurisdiction.

Afterwards, Zhou Xiwu compiled all the investigation reports and wrote Record of the Yushu Investigation, including Travel Notes of Ninghai which describes his observations and historical geography along the way. The book was published in 1920 by the Commercial Press in Shanghai.

== Content ==
In this work, Zhou Xiwu stated: "It is the first step in the management of Qinghai and serves as a reference for those who are concerned about border affairs." This book, the first of its kind, is richly illustrated and provides valuable reference material for the study of Tibetan history in Qinghai. The book also provides detailed records of the source and surrounding water conditions of the Lancang River, noting "The Lancang River has two sources: the northern Zaqu River and the southern Yemuchu River," leaving precious information for future generations.

In addition to local records, this book also explains the origins, nature, and consequences of the Sichuan-Gansu dispute, comprehensively describing the misconduct of Sichuan troops and the Yushu people's reluctance to be governed by Sichuan, which played a significant role in helping the Beiyang Government reassess and make correct decisions regarding this dispute.

== Evaluation ==
- Zhang Qiyun: "A very valuable ethnic history and geography record."
- Lin Chuanjia: "Truly a model for the geographic records of Qinghai in the Greater China."
- Satō Nagamichi's book The Road Between Qinghai and Lhasa in the Qing Dynasty frequently cites Zhou Xiwu's records, highly praising them.
