= Zhu Qinglan =

Chinese military officer

Zhu Qinglan (Chinese: 朱慶瀾), formerly transliterated as Chu Ching-lan (1874 – 13 January 1941) courtesy name Ziqiao (Chinese: 子桥) was a Chinese military officer of the Republic of China.

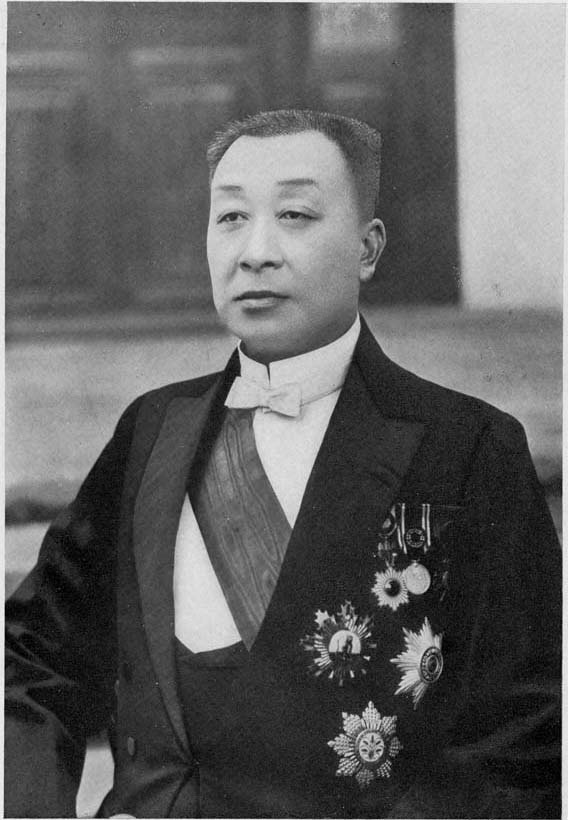
Zhu Qinglan circa 1912

== Military career ==
In mid-1911, Zhu was appointed to serve as Deputy Military Governor for the Great Han Sichuan Military Government. He fled in December that same year, after soldiers mutinied for better pay. Under the Republic of China, Zhu Qinglan was military governor of Heilongjiang from October 1913 to May 1916 and civil governor of Guangdong in 1916-1917 and of Guangxi in 1917. As governor of Jilin in 1919-1921, he was concurrently president of the Chinese Eastern Railway.

By the early 1920s, Heilongjiang, Jilin, Fengtian, Rehe, Chahar and Suiyuan provinces were under the control of the so-called Fengtian Clique, led by Zhang Zuolin. The First Zhili-Fengtian War ended in May 1922 with the defeat of the Fengtian Clique and the expulsion of Zhang Zuolin from the Zhili-Fengtian coalition government in Beijing.

As the subordinate of Zhang Zuolin, Zhu Qinglan served as chief executive of the Eastern Provinces Special District, which comprised the route of the Chinese Eastern Railway, from 4 December 1922 to 1924. During his tenure, the district was redesignated the Eastern provinces Special Region on 1 March 1923 and given full administrative independence equal to that of a province. Near the end of his tenure, an agreement on joint Soviet-Chinese operation of the Chinese Eastern Railway was reached on 31 May 1924.

In 1924 the Fengtian Clique defeated the Zhili Clique, gaining control of Rehe, Zhili and Shandong provinces. Internal conflicts continued; in defiance of the Soviet-Chinese agreement and of the central government, Zhang Zuolin briefly imprisoned Alexei Nikolaevich Ivanov, the manager of the Chinese Eastern Railway, from 21–24 January 1926.

During the campaign carried out by Chiang Kai-shek in central and northern China, Zhang Zuolin was defeated in May 1928. While returning to his base in Manchuria, Zhang was assassinated by Japanese officers who bombed his train at Huanggutun railway station near Shenyang on the Japanese-controlled South Manchurian Railway. He was succeeded as warlord by his son, Zhang Xueliang, who agreed to Manchuria's nominal subordination to Chiang Kai-Shek's government.

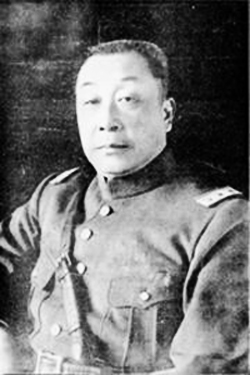
Zhu Qinglan about the time he was president of the Chinese Eastern Railway

Even so, turmoil continued in Manchuria and neighboring Inner Mongolia. A Barga uprising led by the Inner Mongolian politician Merse in August 1928 was unsuccessful, but arrest by the Chinese of the manager of the Chinese Eastern Railway, Mikhail Lashevich, precipitated Lashevich's suicide on 30 August 1928. Lashevich was succeeded as manager by Alexander Ivanovich Yemshanov, who was ousted when war broke out between China and the Soviet Union and Zhang Xueliang seized control of the railway on 10 July 1929. Zhang installed Fan Qiguang as acting manager. Upon the conclusion of peace between China and the Soviet Union, Zhang relinquished control of the Chinese Eastern Railway on 22 December 1929 to yet another Russian manager, Yuliy Vikentyevich Rudnyy.

The Mukden Incident of 18 September 1931 was followed by the gradual Japanese occupation of Manchuria, which was organized into the puppet state of Manchukuo on 18 February 1932. Pu Yi, the last Qing emperor of China, was installed as emperor of Manchukuo by the Japanese on 1 March 1932. It was in this context that Zhu Qinglan organized the Northeastern Army Volunteer Support Society in February 1932.

The territory claimed by Manchukuo included the province of Rehe, and on 21 January 1933 the puppet government proclaimed its annexation. Japanese troops crossed the border on 23 February to add Rehe to Manchukuo. Zhu Qinglan commanded a brigade in the Battle of Rehe (23 February-1 March 1933), but his troops performed so poorly that Zhang Xueliang ordered his arrest. However, Zhang himself was soon after relieved of command. By 12 March 1933, all of China north of the Great Wall was under Japanese control.

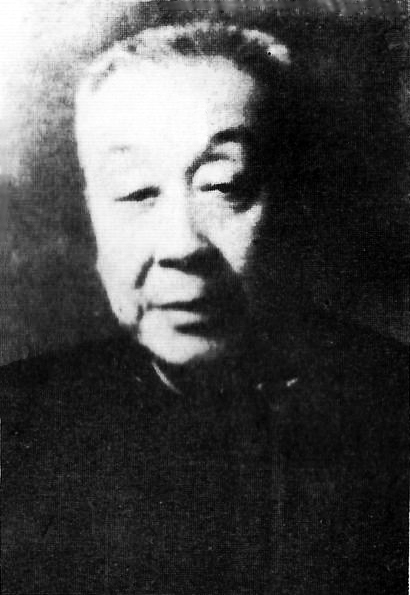
Zhu Qinglan in later life

Zhu Qinglan spent his last years in Xi'an, where he died on 13 January 1941.

== Awards and decorations ==
Order of the Precious Brilliant Golden Grain
Order of Wen-Hu
Order of the Rising Sun
