= Rinchen Lhamo =

Tibetan writer (1901–1929)

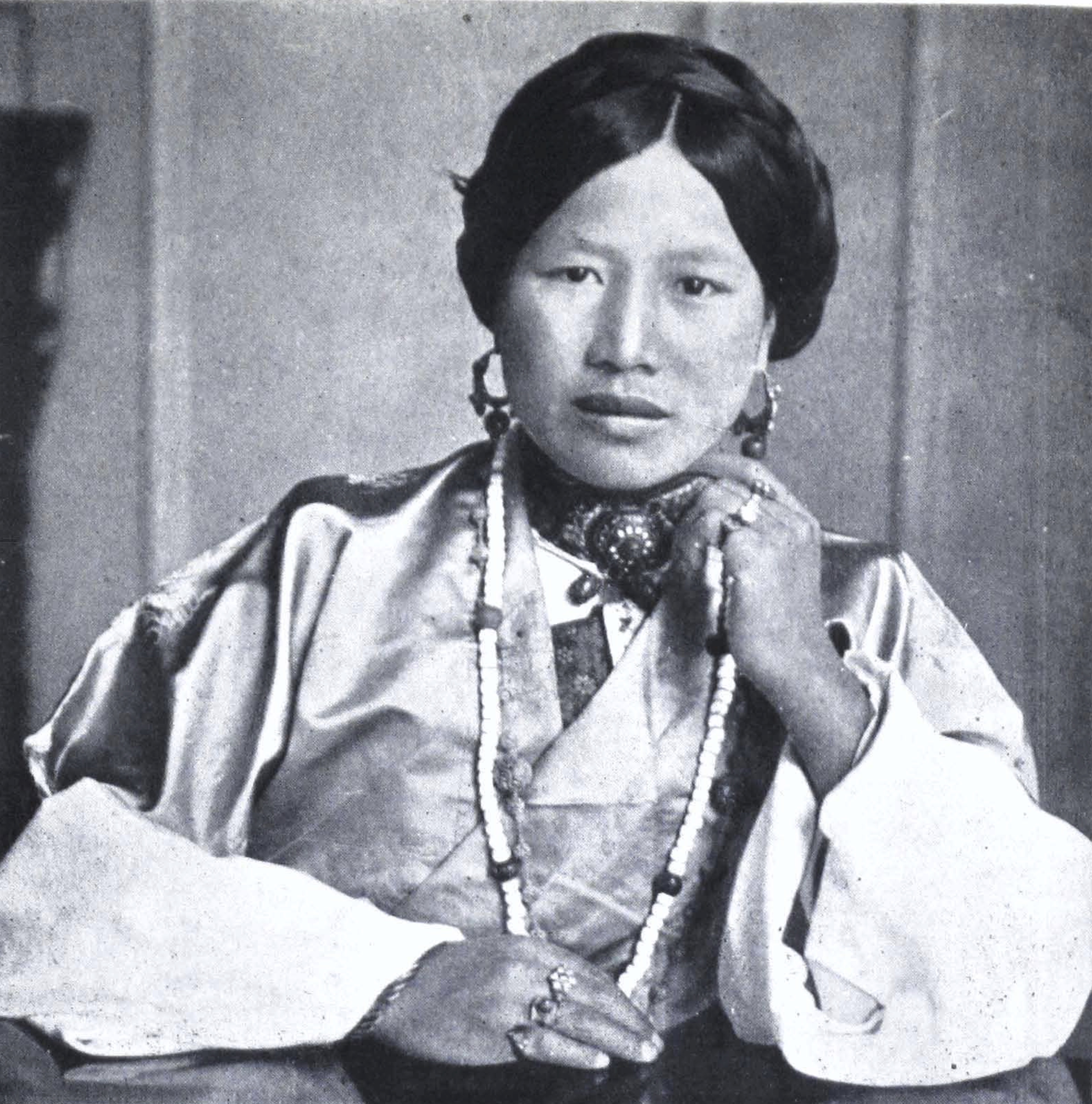
Rinchen Lhamo in her 1926 book

Rinchen Lhamo (18 August 1901 – 13 November 1929), also written as Rin-chen Lha-mo, was a Tibetan writer. Her book, We Tibetans, was published in English in 1926 by Seeley Service & Co.

== Early life ==
Rinchen Lhamo was born into a respected family at Rayaka in Kham, East Tibet. Her father's name was Pade Jangtso, and her brother was Namkha Tendruk (also, written as Namka Dendru).

== Marriage and settling in England ==
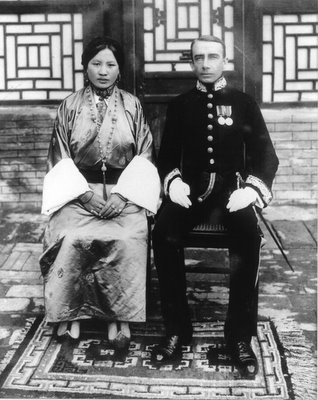
Wedding photograph of Rinchen Lhamo and Louis Magrath King

Rinchen Lhamo met Louis Magrath King (1886–1949), a British Consul stationed at Dartsedo (present day Kangding, Sichuan), probably sometime around 1919–1922. Lhamo and King officially married in 1923, and their marriage is often described as "probably the first Tibetan-British marriage". King was born in Jiujiang, China, the son of Paul Henry King, a Commissioner in the Chinese Customs Service, and Veronica King (née Williamson), and the grandson of Scottish missionary, Alexander Williamson. King had to retire from the consular service to make their marriage official. In 1925, Lhamo and King travelled on a Japanese ship, the SS Kitano Maru, to England, where they settled.

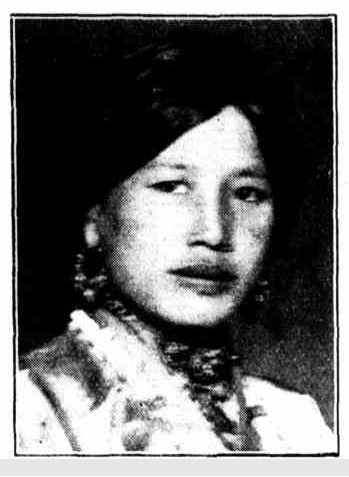
Rinchen Lhamo, from a 1934 newspaper.

In 1926, possibly in response to the John Noel film The Epic of Everest (1924), Lhamo published We Tibetans: An Intimate Picture by a Woman of Tibet, of an Interesting and Distinctive People, a guide to Tibetan culture, religion, and folklore, in English, with an introduction by her British husband. "We are neither primitive nor bizarre," she explained of Tibet to English-speaking newspaper readers. "We are like yourselves, a people with a highly developed culture, spiritual, social, and material. Our minds are no less active, our wits are no less keen, than yours." She particularly objected to how Tibetan women and gender roles were portrayed in Western accounts. However, with regard to her views on the equality of women in Tibetan society which she expressed in an interview given to the Women's Freedom League, one Tibetan commentator has suggested that Rinchen "may have allowed her yearning for her native homeland to somewhat color her memories, which in turn may have influenced the tone of the interview. Nonetheless women in old Tibet certainly had more freedoms and rights than their counterparts in India, China and the rest of Asia, and perhaps even more than in Victorian England." Her opinions about Western beauty, culture, and wealth were reported in many newspapers. Reflecting some of the social and racial prejudices which Rinchen and Louis encountered during their lifetimes, one historian writing in 1988 has questioned her ability to write We Tibetans, however, this assertion has since been countered. One hundred years after it was originally published in English, a Tibetan language version of We Tibetans, translated by Phuntsok Lungrub, was published by the Library of Tibetan Works and Archives (LTWA) in 2026.

Rinchen's husband, Louis Magrath King, gave a collection of Tibetan religious objects and thangka paintings to the British Museum, circa 1918–1919, while serving as a Captain with the Chinese Labour Corps during World War I.

== Personal life ==
Rinchen Lhamo and Louis Magrath King had four children together, including Irene Louise Yudre King (1921–1946), Paul Henry Tindal King (1923–2016), and Martha Lilian Rolfe, née King (1924–2003), and Alexander William Magrath King. At the time of her birth, Rinchen and Louis's eldest daughter, known as Yudre, was given the name “Sheradrema (She(s)-rab (s)Gröl-ma)” by Runtsen Chimbu, the Living Buddha (tulku) of Dorje Drak, Dartsedo. Lhamo moved permanently to England in 1925 with her husband, their children, and her brother, Namkha Tendruk (who returned to Dartsedo in 1932–1933). The family lived in Kensington, London, and Hildenborough, Kent. Rinchen Lhamo died in 1929, aged 28 years, from tuberculosis.

== See also ==
- Interracial marriage
- Miscegenation
