= Paul Henry King =

British colonial official and writer (1853–1938)

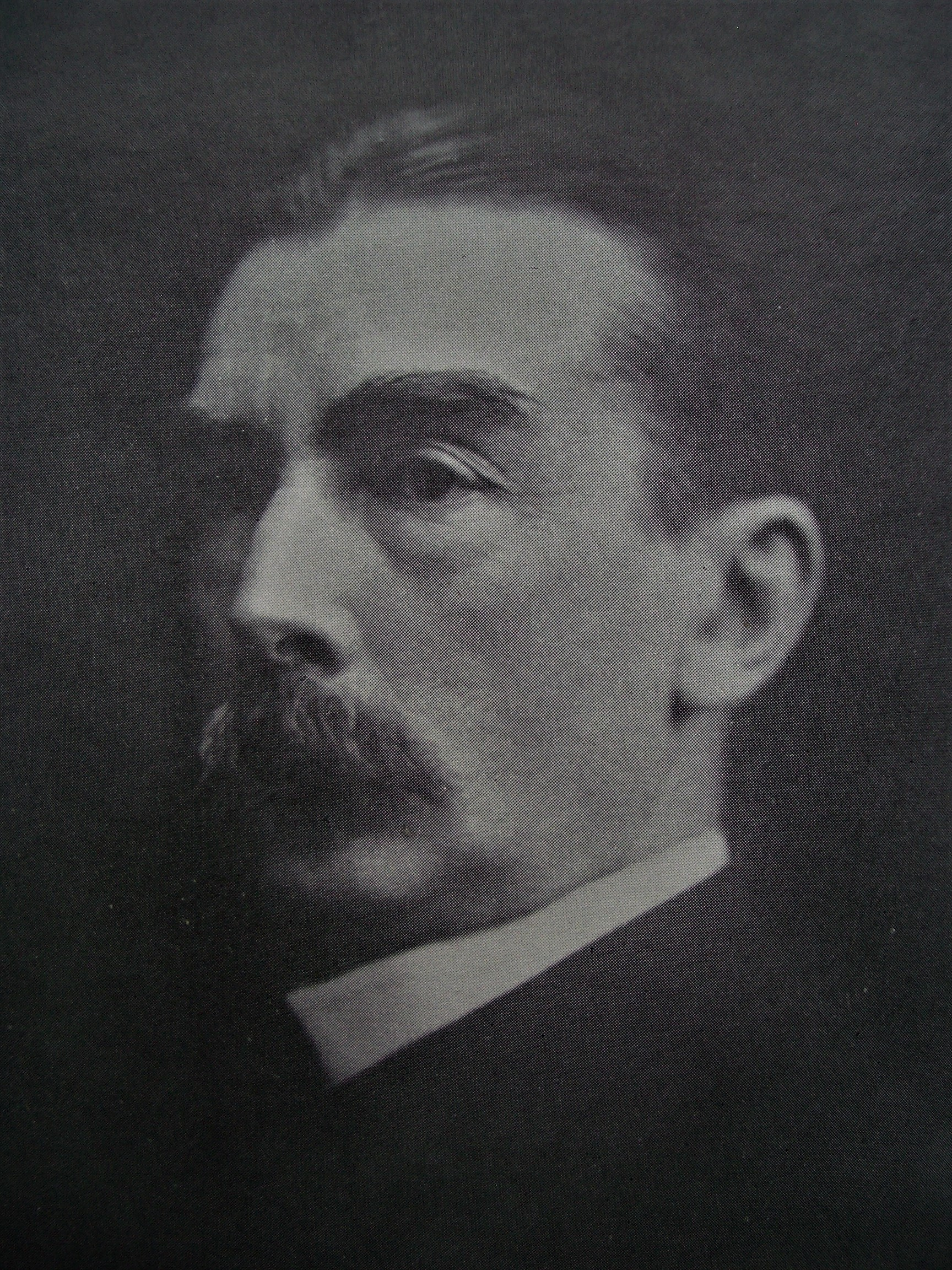
Paul Henry King (1853–1938)

Paul Henry King (3 June 1853 – 31 July 1938) was a British Commissioner in the Chinese Maritime Customs Service, who was closely involved with the Chinese statesman, Li Hongzhang, during the Boxer Uprising of 1900, and also with the Tatsu Maru Incident, which triggered the anti-Japanese campaign in China of 1908. King was also a well-known writer on Chinese politics and culture, who was notably sympathetic to contemporary Chinese views opposing the semi-colonial presence of Western nations in China during the late-nineteenth and early-twentieth centuries.

== Early life and family ==
Paul Henry King, known to his family as 'Jol', was born on 3 June 1853 – the son of Paul John King, Senior Registrar in Chancery, and Anna Maria, née Man. He was also grand-nephew of Sir Nicholas Conyngham Tindal, Chief Justice of the Common Pleas. King was educated at Haileybury School, and served with the London Scottish Regiment for three years from 1870. Following the example of his maternal uncle, John Alexander Man (later known as Man-Stuart), who was personal secretary to Horatio Nelson Lay and Robert Hart, King joined the Chinese Maritime Customs Service and went to China in 1874. In 1881, he married Margaret, née Williamson (known to her family as 'Veronica') at Holy Trinity Cathedral in Shanghai, and the marriage service was conducted by Bishop George Evans Moule. They had seven children, including: Wilfrid Henry Tindal King, who was employed by Jardine, Matheson & Co. in China, Hong Kong, Japan and Taipei, 1908–1937; Louis Magrath King, a British Consul in China, who married the Tibetan writer, Rinchen Lhamo; Carol Mary Langton King, a racing car driver; and Patrick John Richardson King, a squadron leader and later wing commander in the Royal Air Force.

== Career and writings ==
Paul King served as Commissioner in several treaty port cities in China during a long career of forty-seven years, which he described in his memoir, In The Chinese Customs Service, which was first published in 1924, with a revised edition issued in 1930. He was appointed Commissioner at Canton (Guangzhou) in 1900, where he worked alongside and was a supporter of the Chinese statesman, Li Hongzhang, during the period of the Boxer Uprising, when there was much uncertainty regarding the fate of the diplomatic enclave of Western nations in Peking (Beijing). Later, while serving at the same port, he was appointed to help conduct an inquiry into the Tatsu Maru Incident in 1908, when a Japanese ship was seized in Macao having been accused of illegally supplying arms to Chinese revolutionaries, but the seizure was opposed by Japanese officials and the Chinese Imperial Government capitulated, resulting in the boycott of Japanese goods in China. He was also present at the laying of the foundation stone of the Canton terminus of the Kowloon-Canton Railway in 1909. King had a difficult working relationship with Sir Robert Hart, the Inspector General of the Chinese Customs Service. King was placed in charge of the London Office of the Chinese Customs during World War I. During this time he sourced and sent Chinese musical instruments to the members of the Chinese Labour Corps in France. King was twice decorated for his service to China: first, by the Qing Imperial Court with the Order of the Double Dragon (for his involvement in the Tatsu Maru Incident), and, second, by the Government of the Republic of China with the Order of the Golden Grain.

King authored a number of works of fiction and non-fiction, both singly and writing in partnership with his wife (sometimes under the pseudonym, 'William A. Rivers'), exploring various social and class themes relating to life in the treaty ports of China, notably miscegenation or 'Eurasianism,' as it was then commonly termed. King's book, Weighed in China's Balance (1928), is unusual for its attempt to give a balanced and sympathetic explanation of the Chinese perspective upon the semi-colonial presence of the Western powers in China as a result of the Unequal Treaties, a period which has since been described in China as the Century of National Humiliation, but the book was criticised by his contemporaries as being anti-missionary. In later life, King and his wife donated books relating to China to the School of Oriental Studies. Twenty-six volumes of Paul King's diaries and letterbooks, dated 1893–1920, were sold at auction on 12 November 2019 (Sale L19405 – Lot 277) at Sotheby's in London.

== Death ==
Paul King died of a heart attack in Guernsey on 31 July 1938. His obituary for the London Scottish Regiment described him as a great sportsman, his hobbies included: horse riding, fencing, boxing, skating, rowing, cricket, and golf. He was also a proficient linguist, able to speak French, German and Chinese fluently, as well as some Russian.

== Bibliography ==
Works by Paul King:

- Paul King, In the Chinese Customs Service: A Personal Record of Forty-Seven Years (London: T. Fisher Unwin, 1924), republished (London: Heath Cranton, 1930)
- Paul King, Weighed in China's Balance. An Attempt at Explanation (London: Heath Cranton, 1928)
- Paul King (ed.), Voyaging to China in 1855 and 1904: A Contrast in Travel (London: Heath Cranton, 1936), two travel diaries written by Rev. Alexander Williamson & Veronica King
- William A. Rivers [pseudonym of Paul & Veronica King], Anglo-Chinese Sketches (S.R. Menhenott: London, 1903)
- William A. Rivers [pseudonym of Paul & Veronica King], Eurasia: A Tale of Shanghai Life (Shanghai: Kelly & Walsh, 1907)
- William A. Rivers [pseudonym of Paul & Veronica King], The Chartered Junk: A Tale of the Yangtze Valley (Shanghai: Kelly & Walsh, 1910)
- Paul & Veronica King, The Commissioner's Dilemma: An International Tale of the China of Yesterday (London: Heath Cranton, 1929)

Works about or mentioning Paul King:

- John King Fairbank, Katherine Frost Bruner, Elizabeth Macleod Matheson (eds.), The I.G. In Peking: Letters of Robert Hart, Chinese Maritime Customs, 1868–1907 (Cambridge, MA: The Belknap Press, 1975), 2 Vols.
- Robert Bickers, "Purloined Letters: History and the Chinese Maritime Customs Service" Modern Asian Studies, Vol. 40, No. 3 (July, 2006), pp. 691–723 JSTOR 3876543
- Jacqueline Young, "Western Residents of China and Their Fictional Writings, 1890–1914" (Doctoral diss., University of Glasgow, 2011)
- Tim Chamberlain, "Books of Change: A Western Family's Writings on China, 1855–1949" Journal of the Royal Asiatic Society China, Vol. 75, No. 1 (2013), pp. 55–76
- Hans Van de Ven, Breaking with the Past: The Maritime Customs Service and the Global Origins of Modernity in China (New York: Columbia University Press, 2014)
