= Altanochir =

Inner Mongolian politician (1887–?)

- ᠠᠯᠲᠠᠨᠸᠴᠢᠷ
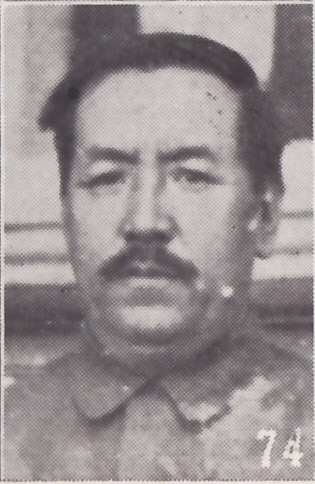
- Altanochir as pictured in The Most Recent Biographies of Chinese Dignitaries

Minister of Communications of Mengjiang
- In office 1939 – 1943

Personal details
- Born: 1887
- Died: after 1949 (aged 61–62)
- Party: Inner Mongolian People's Revolutionary Party
Chinese-character names
Chinese name
Traditional Chinese	阿拉坦鄂齊爾
Simplified Chinese	阿拉坦鄂齐尔
Transcriptions Standard Mandarin: Hanyu Pinyin: Ālātǎnèqíěr; Wade–Giles: A La T'an O Ch'i Erh
Mongolian name
Mongolian Cyrillic	Алтан-Очир
Chinese name
Traditional Chinese	阿勒唐瓦齊爾 阿勒唐瓦其爾
Simplified Chinese	阿勒唐瓦齐尔 阿勒唐瓦其尔
Transcriptions Standard Mandarin: Hanyu Pinyin: Ālētángwǎqíěr; Wade–Giles: A Le T'ang Wa Ch'i Erh
Chinese name
Traditional Chinese	金永昌
Simplified Chinese	金永昌
Transcriptions Standard Mandarin: Hanyu Pinyin: Jīn Yǒngchāng; Wade–Giles: Chin Yung-chang

Altanochir (Note: Also written as Altan Ochir, Altanvachir, or Altan Vachir.) (Note: Mongolian: ᠠᠯᠲᠠᠨᠸᠴᠢᠷ, Алтан-Очир Chinese: 阿拉坦鄂齊爾) (1887 – ?), also known under the Chinese name of Jin Yongchang (Chinese: 金永昌; pinyin: Jīn Yǒngchāng), was an Inner Mongolian politician under the Republic of China and the Mengjiang government.

== Career ==
When Altanochir was in his youth, he was one of a small number of Mongolian students sent to Japan under the sponsorship of Prince Gungsangnorbu of Right Harqin Banner. He would go on to become a member of the Inner Mongolian People's Revolutionary Party. He would go on to join the Mengjiang government in 1937, and rose to the position of Minister of Communications in 1939. He also served as first head of the Mongolian Cultural Centre (蒙古文化館) in Hohhot. In September 1939, he was succeeded by Idchin (伊德欽) in that position, and became rector of the Mongolian Academy (蒙古學院).

Altanochir was known to have remained in mainland China following the establishment of the People's Republic of China in 1949, but his fate after that point is unknown. His son Togtakhu (托克托琥) was active in the Kuomintang, and went on to teach at the Mongolian and Tibetan School in Beijing.

== Bibliography ==
- Atwood, Christopher (1992), "The East Mongolian Revolution and Chinese Communism", Mongolian Studies, 15: 7–83
- 金海 — Jin Hai (2008), "日本占领时期蒙古族新闻出版活动述略 — Overview of Mongolian ethnic news publication activities during the Japanese occupation" (PDF), Journal of the Central University for Nationalities, Philosophy and Social Sciences Edition, 35 (4): 60–67, archived from the original (PDF) on 2012-03-28
- Li, Narangoa; Cribb, R. B. (2003), Imperial Japan and national identities in Asia, 1895-1945, Nordic Institute of Asian Studies monograph series, Routledge, ISBN 978-0-7007-1482-7
- Atwood, Christopher (April 2000), "Inner Mongolian Nationalism in the 1920s: A Survey of Documentary Information", Twentieth-Century China, 25 (2): 75–113, doi:10.1179/tcc.2000.25.2.75
- 最新支那要人伝 — Newest Biographies of Important Figures in China, 朝日新聞社 — Asahi Shimbun Company, 1941, OCLC 23310651
