= Margaret Williamson King =

Scottish author (1861–1949)

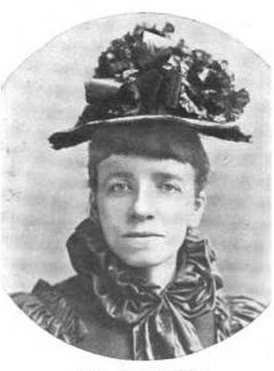
Madge King, from a 1901 publication.

Madge King's signature, from a 1901 publication.

Margaret Williamson King (1861–1949) was a Scottish author born in Ardrossan Road, Saltcoats, Ayrshire Scotland. She used various pen names, including Veronica King and Madge King, and with her husband, William A. Rivers.

== Early life ==
Margaret Alice Houston Williamson was born in Scotland, the daughter of Protestant Christian missionaries Alexander Williamson and Isabelle Dougall Williamson. Her parents were from Scotland, and both of them wrote books about their experiences in China.

== Career ==
Books by King included two novels, Cousin Cinderella (1892) and Lord Goltho: An Apostle of Whiteness (1893). Books co-written with her husband appeared under the joint pen name "William A. Rivers", or crediting "Veronica and Paul King", and included Anglo-Chinese Sketches (1903), Eurasia: A Tale of Shanghai Life (1907), The Chartered Junk: A Tale of the Yangtze Valley (1910), Theodora's Stolen Family (1928), The Commissioner's Dilemma: An International Tale of the China of Yesterday (1929) and Looking Inwards (1931). She also published one of her father's journals with one of her own, as Voyaging to China in 1855 and 1904: A Contrast in Travel (1936). Madge King also wrote articles about China for British publications.

The Kings wrote about their travels in the United States in two critical volumes, The Raven on the Skyscraper: A Study of Modern American Portents (1925) and Under the Eagle's Feathers (1926).

== Personal life ==
Margaret Williamson (known to her family as 'Veronica') married Paul Henry King (1853–1938), a Commissioner in the Chinese Maritime Customs Service, at Shanghai's Holy Trinity Cathedral in 1881. They had five sons, Duncan, Paul, Wilfrid, Louis, and Patrick, and two daughters, Dulcie and Carol. Their fourth son Louis Magrath King (1886–1949) married a Tibetan woman, Rinchen Lhamo, and they continued the family tradition of writing about China and Tibet. Margaret Williamson King died in England in 1949, aged 88 years.
