= Great Han Sichuan Military Government =

1911-1912 regional military government in Sichuan

Great Han Sichuan Military Government 大漢四川軍政府 (Mandarin Chinese)
- 1911-1912
- The two alleged versions of the "Dahan banner", the flag used by the Great Han Sichuan Military Government
- Capital: Chengdu
- Recognised national languages: Mandarin Chinese
- Ethnic groups: Sichuanese people
- Demonym: Sichuanese
- Government: Regional military government
  - Military Governor: Pu Dianjun
  - Deputy Governor: Zhu Qinglan
  - Director of War (Later Military Governor): Yin Changheng

Domestic sovereignty
- History
  - Established after rebellion in Sichuan, part of the 1911 Revolution: 27 November 1911
  - Merged with Shu Military Government to form Sichuan Military Government: 27 April 1912 1912

Area
  - Total: 485,000 km^{2} (187,000 sq mi)

Population
  - Estimate: 70,000,000 (1911)
- Currency: Yuan
Preceded by	Succeeded by
Qing dynasty	Republic of China
- Today part of: Sichuan, China

The Great Han Sichuan Military Government (Chinese: 大漢四川軍政府; pinyin: Dàhàn Sìchuān jūnzhèngfǔ; Wade–Giles: Ta-han Ssŭ-ch'uan chün-chêng-fu), alternatively the Great Han Szechwan Military Government, was a provincial military government located in modern-day Sichuan, that was formed during the 1911 Xinhai Revolution. It lasted for 142 days, and ended with the absorption of the province into the newly-proclaimed Republic of China.

== History ==
=== Prelude ===
In 1901, a revolutionary organization called the "Public Strength Society" (Chinese: 公強會; pinyin: Gōngqiánghuì; Wade–Giles: Kung-chiang-hui) was established in Chongqing. by Mei Jixun (梅際郇), Tong Xianmao (童顯懋), Chen Chonggong (陳崇功) and Yang Lukan (楊廬堪). Its proclaimed purpose was to "seek ways to enrich the country and strengthen the army, and to enlighten the people's wisdom," with the goal of overthrowing the Manchu-led Qing dynasty and establishing a Han-led democratic government. Although its activities concluded in 1906, the Public Strength Society formed the basis for the formation of the Tongmenghui's Chongqing branch. In late summer of 1911, riots broke out in Sichuan, as part of the Railway Protection Movement. The movement hoped to stop the Qing government's nationalization of local railway projects, the profits of which would be used to pay debts to the Western powers. Duanfang, superintendent of the Hankou-Guangzhou and Hankou-Sichuan railways, as well as Zhao Erfeng, Governor-General of Sichuan, petitioned for the deployment of New Army units from neighbouring Hubei to crush the Railway Protection Movement. The riots were crushed, and an uneasy peace was established in the region.

=== 1911 Revolution ===
On 10 October 1911, a mutiny broke out amongst New Army soldiers in the city of Wuchang in Hubei. The city was captured by the next morning, and the Governor-General of Huguang, Ruicheng, fled. The mutineers subsequently established the Military Government of Hubei, independent of the Qing dynasty.

The success of the uprising soon stirred uprisings in other neighboring provinces, as the revolutionaries beseeched other provinces to secede from the Qing government in turn. On 25 September, Wu Yuzhang (吳玉章) and Wang Tianjie (王天傑) declared the independence of Rong County under the "Rong County MIlitary Government" (榮縣軍政府). On 21 November, revolutionaries in Guang'an declared independence and established the "Great Han Military Government of Northern Sichuan" (大漢蜀北軍政府), with Wu Chongzhou (吳崇週) as Governor-General and Zhang Guanfeng (張觀風) as his deputy. The next day, Chongqing, the seat of the Government-General of Sichuan, declared independence from the Qing dynasty and proclaimed the Sichuan Military Government (蜀軍政府). On 27 November, the Great Han Sichuan Military Government was founded with Pu Dianjun (蒲殿俊) as Governor-General.

A public gathering following the declaration of the Great Han Sichuan Military Government on November 27, 1911

The Declaration of Independence of the Great Han Sichuan Military Government read as follows:

The Sichuan people fought against the government for the sake of the [rail]road; they fought fiercely and did not care about death. In less than two or three months, China collapsed. Each province declared independence one after another, and now also we Sichuanese brought our resplendent and glorious Great Han Independent Military Government into being today. The purpose of the Great Han Sichuan Military Government is to organize a republican constitution, based on the universal principles of humanitarianism, to consolidate the authority of our Great Han federation, and be boundless to the world. We 70 million people of Sichuan and our descendants should protect it together.

Pu declared himself Military Governor, and appointed Zhu Qinglan to serve as Deputy Military Governor. Reportedly, the reason Zhu was chosen for the position was due to the negative attitude he took regarding the use of force to suppress the Railway Protection Movement. Pu also appointed another revolutionary, Yin Changheng, to the position of Director of War.

The flag of the Great Han Sichuan Military Government, called the "Dahan banner," was described as a white field with the Chinese ideogram "Han" inside a ring, surrounded by 18 smaller rings. The exact color of the rings is debated, with some sources claiming it was red; while others claim it was black.

=== Sichuan soldiers mutiny ===
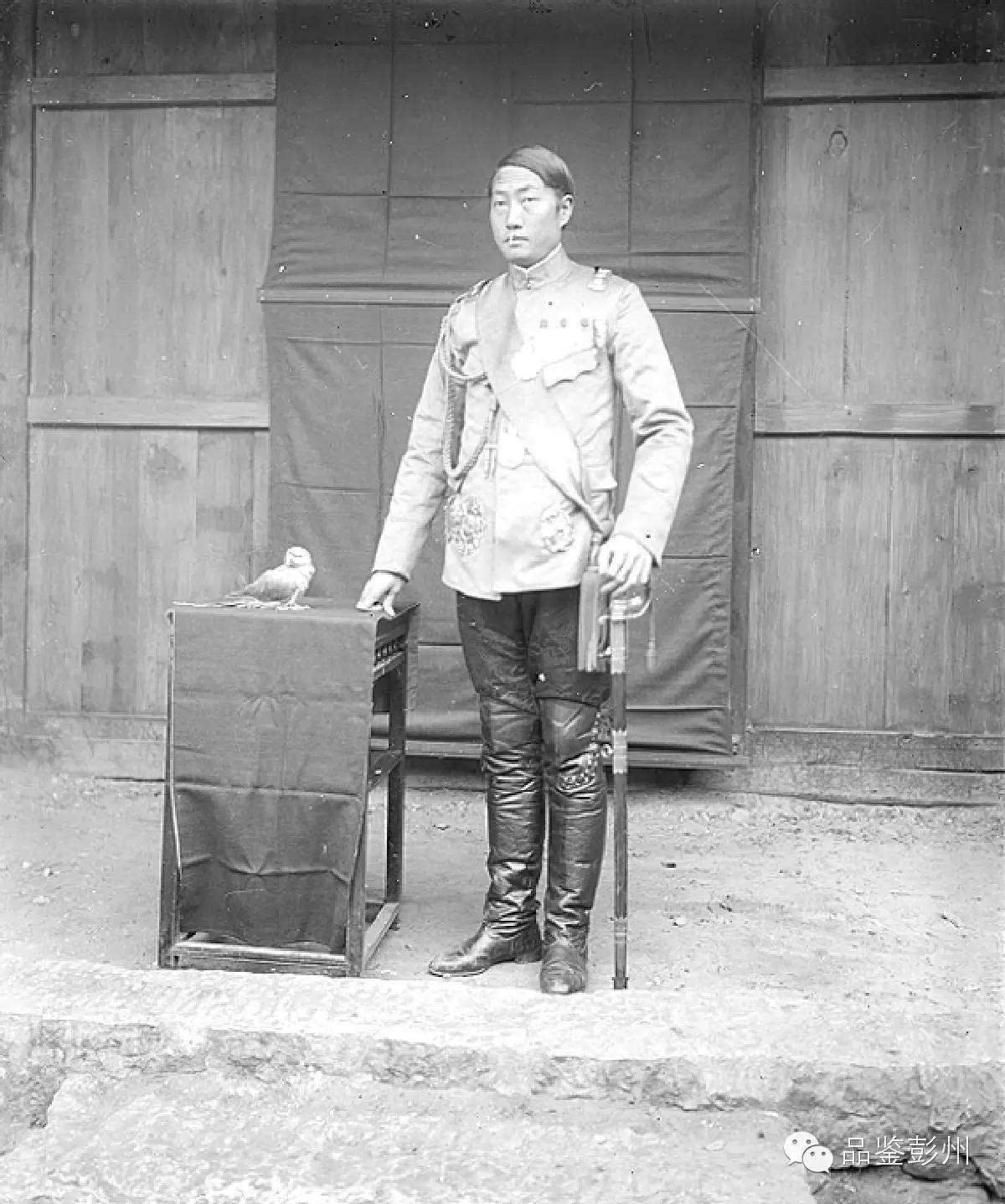
Yin Changheng, Director of War

On 8 December, Sichuan soldiers mutinied in Chengdu, dissatisfied with the delay regarding their military pay. Pu and Zhu both resigned and fled, leaving Yin in charge to stop the mutiny. Yin managed to stop the mutineers, and led his troops to attack the Governor's Gate where they captured Zhao Erfeng, executing him on the grounds of him leading the "counter-revolutionary conspiracy". Yin had so much public support that he arose to become the military governor due to his bravery. As military governor, he promoted the reorganization of the military government, finally managing to stabilize the situation in Sichuan.

=== Government merger ===
A 1912 banknote, worth 1 yuan, issued by the Bank of Sichuan

Two major governments existed in the Sichuan region: The Great Han Sichuan Military Government and the Shu Military Government. The latter had been established in November 1911, and was led by Zhang Peijue. Yin planned to unify them by force, and invited the army of the Yunnan clique to aid in unification. Yin gave up on forceful reunification after mediation, and the Yunnan Army left Sichuan. Both governments sent representatives to Chongqing to make an agreement in January 1912. The sides eventually came to an agreement on 21 March: Chengdu would serve as the political center and would house the Sichuan Governor's Office, with the governors of Great Han Sichuan and Shu respectively serving as chief and deputy governors. Chongqing would be an important town, and a pacification office established there. The two governments officially merged on 27 April, officially bringing both the Great Han Sichuan Military Government and the Shu Military Government to their ends. The new government was simply named the Sichuan Military Government.

Yin was appointed as the military governor of the Sichuan Governor's Office, Zhang was appointed as the deputy governor, and Xia Zhishi was appointed as the chief pacification chief of the Chongqing Pacification Office.

=== Absorption by the Republic of China ===
The new Sichuan Military Government existed in a region with over ten other military governments. To the west, the rapidly-expanding Republic of China soon reached the Sichuan region. Sichuan was soon absorbed as a province of the Republic, putting an end to all of the military governments in the region, including the Sichuan Military Government.

== Bibliography ==
- Chen Zuwu (陈祖武), Yin Chanheng. Institute of Modern History, the Chinese Academy of Social Sciences (2000). The Biographies of Republic People, Vol.10 (民国人物传 第10卷). Zhonghua Book Company. ISBN 7-101-02114-X.
- Xu Youchun (徐友春) (main ed.) (2007). Unabridged Biographical Dictionary of the Republic, Revised and Enlarged Version (民国人物大辞典 增订版). Hebei People's Press (Hebei Renmin Chubanshe; 河北人民出版社). ISBN 978-7-202-03014-1.
