= Inner Mongolian People's Revolutionary Party =

Inner Mongolian People's Revolutionary Party Дотоод Монголын Ардын Хувьсгалын Нам ᠳᠣᠲᠣᠭᠠᠳᠤ ᠮᠣᠩᠭᠣᠯ ᠤᠨ ᠠᠷᠠᠳ ᠤᠨ ᠬᠤᠪᠢᠰᠬᠠᠯ ᠤᠨ ᠨᠠᠮ
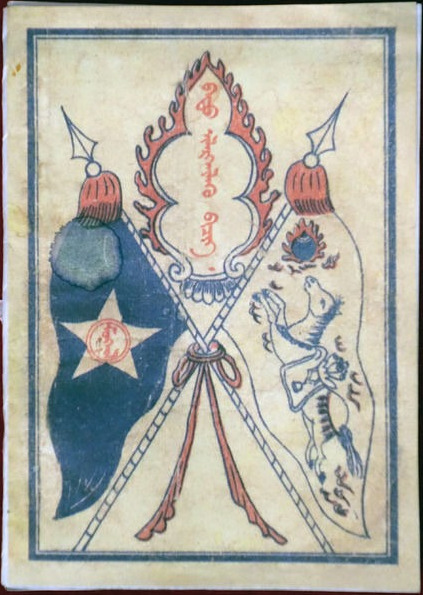
- Leader: Mersé; Serengdongrub
- Founded: October 1925; 100 years ago
- Dissolved: 1946; 80 years ago
- Merged into: Chinese Communist Party
- Headquarters: Kalgan
- Ideology: Communism; Marxism–Leninism; Mongolian nationalism Pan-Mongolism; Secularism
- Political position: Far-left

Party flag
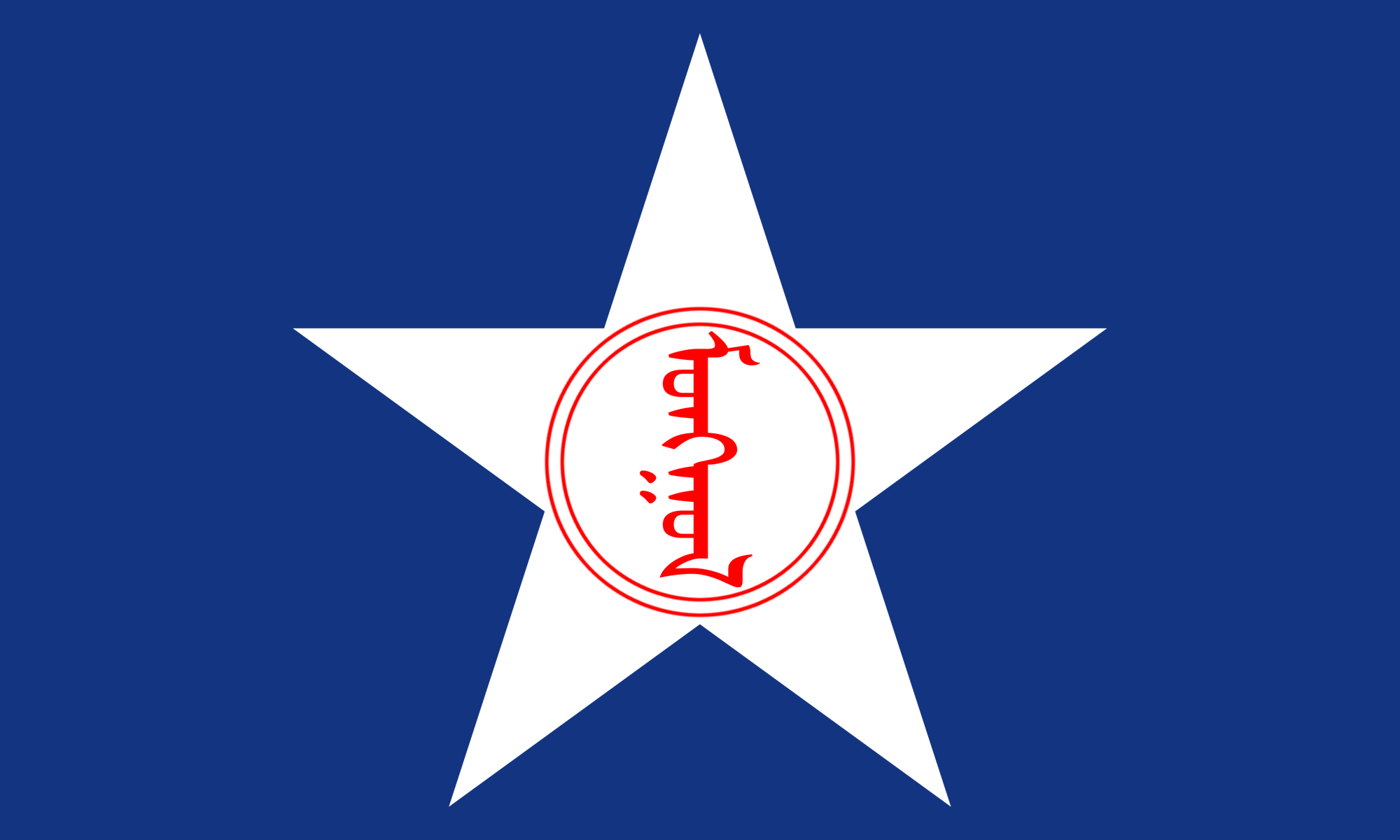

The Inner Mongolian People's Revolutionary Party (Mongolian: Дотоод Монголын Ардын Хувьсгалын Нам, romanized: Dotoɣadu Mongɣol-un Arad-un Qubisqal-un Nam; Chinese: 內蒙古人民革命黨) was a political party in Inner Mongolia. The party was founded by a number of politically active Inner Mongolian youth including Mersé and Serengdongrub in Kalgan in October 1925 in Zhangjiakou. Mersé, who had contacts with the Mongolian People's Revolutionary Party and Comintern, became the general secretary of the party. Others present at their inaugural meeting included Altanochir, Fumintai, and Sainbayar.

The party advocated Mongolian self-determination and socialism, abolishment of feudalism and of the influence of the religious hierarchy.

The party was allied to the Chinese Communist Party. It was dissolved in 1946.

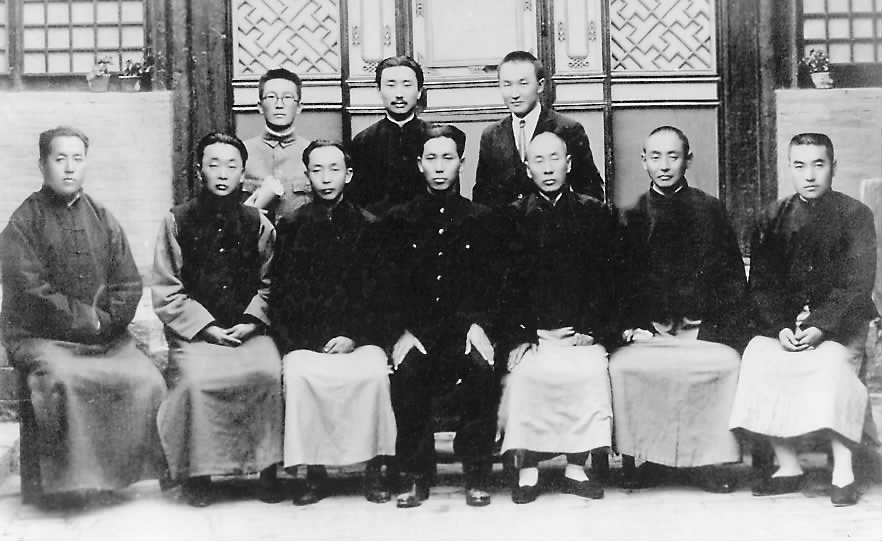
Founder of the party in October 1925

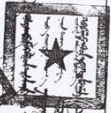
Stamp of Inner Mongolian People's Revolutionary Party
