= Yin Changheng =

Chinese military officer (1884–1953)

Yin Changheng 尹昌衡
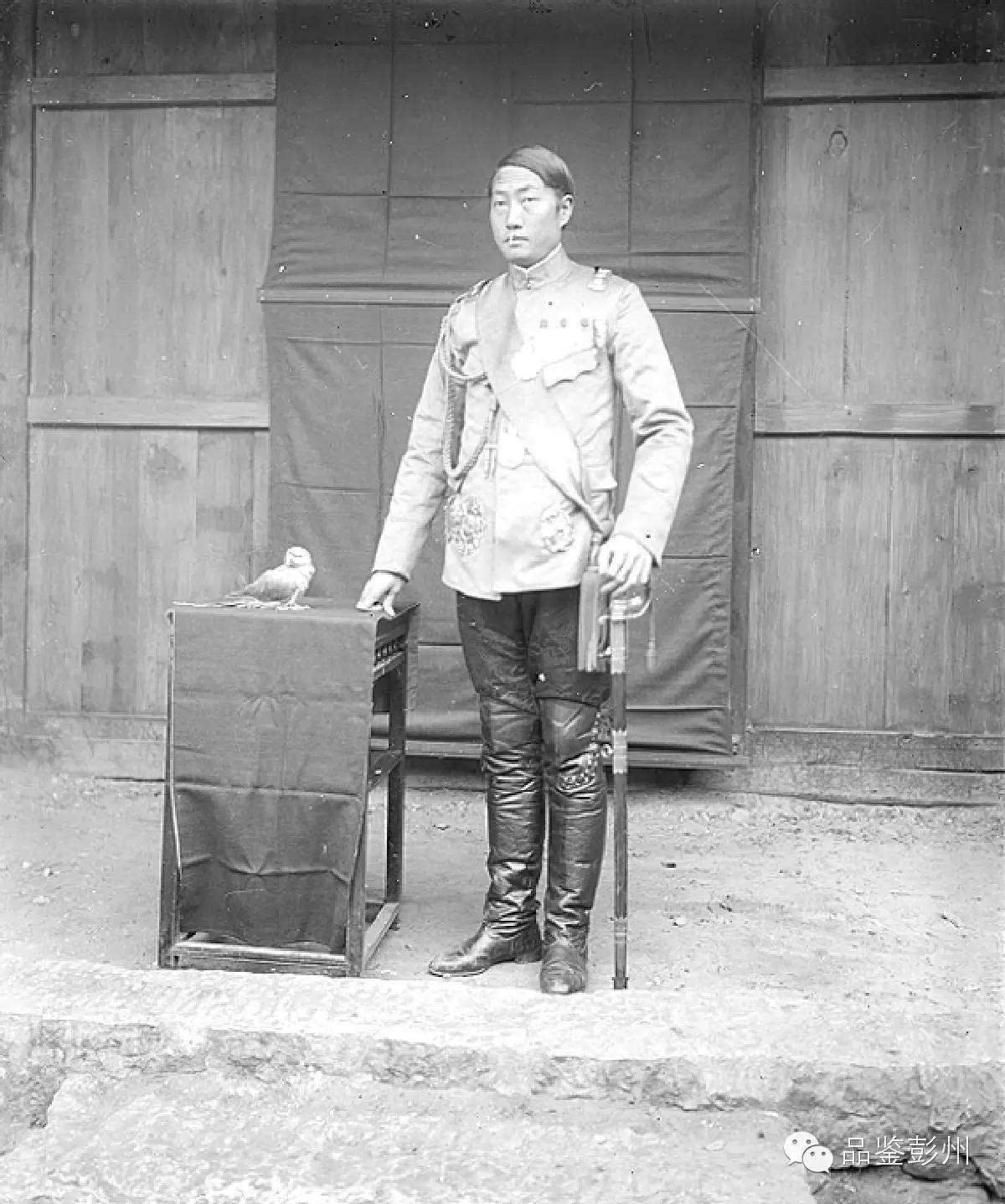
- Yin Changheng between 1912-1928
- Born: July 11, 1884; Peng District, Sichuan, Qing Empire
- Died: May 26, 1953 (aged 68); Xichang, Xikang, China
- Military career
- Allegiance: Qing Dynasty (Republic of China (1912–1949)) Republic of China

Yin Changheng (Chinese: 尹昌衡; pinyin: Yǐn Chānghéng; Wade–Giles: Yin Ch'ang-heng; July 11, 1884 – May 26, 1953) was a military leader in the Qing Dynasty and the Republic of China. He was a member of the Tongmenghui, and on the outbreak of the Xinhai Revolution he became one of the leaders of the revolutionary army in Sichuan. He was the first Military Governor of Sichuan Province and one of the founders of the Sichuan Army (Sichuan Clique). His former name was Changyi (昌儀). Courtesy name was Shuo Quan (碩権). He was born in Peng District, Sichuan.

== Biography ==
=== Revolutionaries ===
In 1903, Yin Changheng entered to the Sichuan Military School in the first period. In next year he went to Japan where he entered the Tokyo Shimbu Military Academy by public money, and continued on to graduation from the Infantry School of the 6th class of the Imperial Japanese Army Academy. During his stay in Japan he approved the ideology of revolution, in 1906 he became a member of the Tongmenghui and subsequently he participated in the “Party of Blood-and-Iron Warriors” (鐵血丈夫團).

In 1908, Yin Changheng returned to China and participated to maneuvers of new armies at Tianjin. In 1909, he went to Guangxi where he was appointed the head of the bureau of translation in the Guangxi Training Office (廣西督練公所編譯科長) and the instructor of the Ground Staff College (幹部學堂教練). But in 1910 Qing authorities suspected he was a secret supporter of the anti-Qing revolutionary movement, so he resigned his post and went back to Sichuan. It was not long before he was appointed the head of the bureau of translation in the Sichuan Training Office (四川督練公所編譯科長) and the instructor of the Sichuan Military School. In 1911 he became the Vice-President of the Training Office for New Army (新軍教練處會辦) and the acting President of the Military Elementary School (陸軍小學總辦代理).

=== The first Military Governor of the Sichuan ===
On the outbreak of the Xinhai Revolution in same October, the revolutionaries of Sichuan also rose in rebellion, so the Viceroy of Sichuan Zhao Erfeng stepped down from his post. The revolutionaries established the Great Han Sichuan Military Government (大漢四川軍政府) in Chengdu, Pu Dianjun who was the Chairman of the Sichuan Provincial Assembly became the Military Governor. Yin Changheng became the Director of War under Pu's direction. But on 8 December a part of the Sichuan Army rose in rebellion at Chengdu because of the delayed payment of wages, Pu escaped from Sichuan. Yin commanded his army and quelled the insurgent troops quickly, so he succeeded Pu's position by the backing of public opinion. On 22 December Yin captured Zhao Erfeng and executed him because of the conspiracy of counter-revolution.

In January 1912, Yin Changheng started to negotiate with Shu Military Government (蜀軍政府) (Military Governor is Zhang Peijue (張培爵)) which was established at Chongqing in November 1911. On 21 March same year both governments agreed to merge with each other and established the new Sichuan Government. Yin remained as the Military Governor and Zhang became the Vice Military Governor of the new government.

At that time, the Tibetan Army which supported by the United Kingdom clashed with Sichuan Army at the border between Sichuan and Tibet. On 22 April same year Yin was appointed the Commander-in-Chief of the Military for the Subjugation of Tibet (征藏總司令) by Yuan Shikai. On 10 July he went on a campaign to the frontier of Sichuan and defeated the Tibetan Army. On 25 September he also held the Pacification Commander in the frontier of Sichuan (川邊鎮撫使). On next month he received the title of lieutenant general. In April 1913 he returned in triumph to Chengdu.

=== Downfall and his later years ===
After returning to Chengdu, Yin Changheng came into collision with his powerful subordinate Hu Jingyi (胡景伊), the commander of an army corps of All Sichuang (全川陸軍軍團長). Hu aspired to replace Yin as Military Governor of Sichuan and approached Yuan Shikai. On 13 June 1913 Yin was transferred to become Administrative Commander in the frontier of Sichuan (川邊經略使), and Hu succeeded into Yin's position. Yin lodged a protest to Yuan, but Yuan's decision did not change. Yin lost his power in Sichuan.

Having thus been sidelined, Yin Changheng lost motivation and in November 1913 went to Beijing on sick leave. In January 1914 the position of Administrative Commander in the frontier of Sichuan was repealed. In a short time Zhao Erfeng's elder brother Zhao Erxun cooperated with Hu Jingyi and intrigued against Yin. On 2 February same year Yin was arrested by the order of Yuan, and he was sentenced to nine years' penal servitude on the charge of murdering Zhao Erfeng.

In June 1916 Yuan Shikai died, and Yin was pardoned. Later he became the Adviser of the Military Governor of Jiangsu, Li Chun. In 1920 Yin became the subordinate of Sun Yat-sen, but in next year he seceded from every political circle and lived in retirement in Chengdu. On the establishing of the People's Republic of China Yin remained in Sichuan. Yin died on 26 May 1953, at Xichang, Xikang.

Writing in 1927, Louis Magrath King, a former British Consul in Sichuan, described Yin Changheng, whom King considered a friend, as a 'philosopher' who "expounded a sort of theosophy all his own, synthesizing the leading religions, Confucianism and Taoism and Islam and Buddhism and the two main divisions of Christianity."

== Footnotes ==
- Chen Zuwu (陈祖武), Yin Chanheng. Institute of Modern History, the Chinese Academy of Social Sciences (2000). The Biographies of Republic People, Vol.10 (民国人物传 第10卷). Zhonghua Book Company. ISBN 7-101-02114-X.
- Qiu Qin (丘琴) and Jiang Kefu (姜克夫), Zhu Qinglan. Institute of Modern History, the Chinese Academy of Social Sciences (2000). The Biographies of Republic People, Vol.10 (民国人物传 第10卷). Zhonghua Book Company. ISBN 7-101-02114-X.
- Xu Youchun (徐友春) (main ed.) (2007). Unabridged Biographical Dictionary of the Republic, Revised and Enlarged Version (民国人物大辞典 增订版). Hebei People's Press (Hebei Renmin Chubanshe; 河北人民出版社). ISBN 978-7-202-03014-1.
- Liu Shoulin (刘寿林) (etc.ed.) (1995). The Chronological Table of the Republic's Officer (民国职官年表). Zhonghua Book Company. ISBN 7-101-01320-1.
- King, Louis Magrath (1927) China in Turmoil: Studies in Personality. Heath Cranton. Chapter 17, contains a photograph of Yin Changheng with other officers. Internet Archive
