= Alexander Williamson (missionary) =

Scottish missionary (1829–1890)

Alexander Williamson (5 December 1829 – September 1890) was a Scottish Protestant missionary to China with the London Missionary Society. He was known for his scholarship and translation work as well as founding of the Society for the Diffusion of Christian and General Knowledge Among the Chinese (or the Christian Literature Society for China). He was the predecessor to Timothy Richard as head of this society.

== Missionary experiences ==
Williamson was born in Falkirk, Scotland. He was the eldest of seven sons. As a young man he worked at a large mercantile establishment. After this work he attended Glasgow University with the aim of going to China as a missionary. He completed his arts and theological studies, and offered himself to, and was accepted by, the London Missionary Society for the mission field in China.

For seven years he worked in evangelism, Chinese literary studies, and traveling. His health and strength wore out and he came home to Scotland on furlough from 1858 to 1863 to recover.

In 1863 Williamson returned to China with the National Bible Society of Scotland as its first agent there. He started at Yantai in Shandong Province and then travelled extensively distributing copies of the Bible in Chinese. During this period he visited Beijing, Mongolia, and Manchuria.

In 1867, Alexander Williamson, who had given Robert Jermain Thomas Bibles to take to Korea, journeyed to north-eastern China to the border with Korea. There at “Korea Gate,” Williamson sold Christian books to Korean border merchants.

In August 1869, his younger brother and fellow missionary, James Williamson also of the London Missionary Society, was murdered near Tianjin. That same year, Alexander returned to Britain.

In 1871, Williamson was awarded a Doctorate of Law by the University of Glasgow for his writings about China.

Between 1871 and 1883 he was back at Yantai with the NBSS and in 1874 also with the Scottish United Presbyterian Mission.

In 1883 he had to return to Scotland for health reasons. While he was there he founded the “Book and Tract Society for China” (later renamed in 1887: the “Society for Diffusion of Christian and General Knowledge among the Chinese” or the “Christian Literature Society for China”).

Williamson returned to China again and was in Shanghai in 1886, when his wife Isabelle died. He died four years later at Yantai in 1890. He was 61. His daughter Margaret Williamson King (known to her family as Veronica King) wrote about China, as did her son Louis Magrath King, and his Tibetan wife, Rinchen Lhamo.

== Works authored ==
- Natural Theology
- Journeys in North China, Manchuria, and Eastern Mongolia; with some account of Corea, 2 vols. London: Smith, Elder, 1870 Volume One, Volume 2

== Works authored by his wife Isabelle ==
- Isabelle Williamson (1884). Old Highways in China. Religious Tract Society. p. 17.
- Old Highways in China, 1884
  - reissued by LULU Press, 2010 Google Books
  - reissued by the British Library, 2011 ISBN 9781241234867 description by Boomerang Books
