= Louis Magrath King =

British consul (1886–1949)

Louis Magrath King (1886–1949), born at Jiujiang, Jiangxi, China. King was appointed as a British Consul at Dartsedo (Kangding, Sichuan, China) in 1913, which was then a trading town on the border between the Chinese Empire and Tibet. King was the son of Paul Henry King, a Commissioner in the Chinese Customs Service, and writer Margaret Williamson King (known to her family as Veronica King), and the grandson of Scottish missionary Alexander Williamson. King's sister, Carol Mary Langton King was a racing car driver.

King was married to Rinchen Lhamo, author of We Tibetans (London: Seeley, Service, 1926). Lhamo came from a respected family in Kham, East Tibet. The couple probably met sometime around 1919–1922, and were officially married in 1923. Theirs is often described as "probably the first Tibetan-British marriage". They settled in England in 1925 and had four children together, including Irene Louise Yudre King (1921–1946), Paul Henry Tindal King (1923–2016), Martha Lilian Rolfe, née King (1924–2003), and Alec King. After Rinchen's death in 1929, Louis went on to marry an English woman named Margaret (née Moulton), and they had several children together, including Martyn King, who later became a striker for Colchester football team.

King was the author of various books, articles and reviews about China and Tibet. King also gave a collection of Tibetan religious objects and thangka paintings to the British Museum, circa 1918–1919, while serving as a Captain with the Chinese Labour Corps during World War 1.

== Bibliography ==
- Louis Magrath King, China As It Really Is: By A Resident In Peking (London: Eveleigh Nash, 1912)
- Louis Magrath King, 'Historical Introduction' in We Tibetans, by Rinchen Lhamo (London: Seeley, Service & Co, 1926), facsimile edition reprinted in 1985 and 1997
- Louis Magrath King, 'Modern Chinese Portraits', in Blackwoods Magazine (March–August, 1926), a series of articles later published in China in Turmoil (London: Heath Cranton, 1927)
- Louis Magrath King, China in Turmoil – Studies in Personality (London: Heath Cranton, 1927)
- Louis Magrath King, By Tophet Flare (London: Methuen, 1937)
- Louis Magrath King, The Warden of the Marches: A Tale of Adventure on the Chinese Frontier of Tibet (Boston: Houghton Mifflin, 1938), first published in the UK as By Tophet Flare (London: Methuen, 1937)
- Louis Magrath King, 'Cause and Effect in China', in Contemporary Review, No. 172 (August, 1947), pp. 94–98
- Louis Magrath King, A Brief Account of 1500 Years of Tibetan History, facsimile edition reprinted in 1985 [originally published in 1926 as the 'Historical Introduction' to Rinchen Lhamo's We Tibetans (London: Seeley, Service, 1926)]
