= Merse (politician) =

Chinese politician

Merse (also known as Guo Daofu, 1894–?) was an Inner Mongolian politician, best known as a founder of the Inner Mongolian People's Revolutionary Party (IMPRP). He was a Daur from a noble family native to Hulunbuir.

== Names ==
"Merse" is transcribed into Chinese as Chinese: 墨爾色; pinyin: Mò'ěrsè. The final "e" is pronounced, not silent as in English; to emphasise this, some sources write "Mersé". Others write Mersee, a transcription from the Mongolian Cyrillic alphabet spelling Мэрсээ. It is an abbreviation of the Daur name Mersentei (Chinese: 墨爾森泰; pinyin: Mò'ěrsēntài). He also used the Chinese name Kuo Tao-fu (Chinese: 郭道甫; pinyin: Guō Dàofu), formed with his courtesy name (道甫) as a given name and the first character Guo of his Daur clan name Gobulo (Chinese: 郭博勒; pinyin: Guōbólē) as a Chinese-style surname. He also used the art-name Chun Hwang (Chinese: 浚黃; pinyin: Jùn Huáng).

== Education and early career ==
Merse studied at the Mongol-Manchu School (滿蒙學校) in Hailar. In 1910 he entered the Heilongjiang First Provincial Middle School (黑龍江省立第一中學), graduating four years later. In 1915, he enrolled in the Russian Language Institute (俄文專修館) of the Ministry of Foreign Affairs in Beijing. After completing his course there in 1917, he returned to his hometown Hailar, where in 1918 he established a private school. In 1920 the local government converted it into a banner-supported public school; he continued as principal.

== In politics ==
Early in his political life, Merse established close ties with the independent state of Mongolia and the Soviet Union. In 1922, he attended a Pan-Mongolist conference organised by Buryat at Verkhneudinsk (today Ulan-Ude, capital of the Republic of Buryatia). In October 1925, he became the secretary-general of the newly founded Inner Mongolian People's Revolutionary Party at Kalgan (Zhangjiakou. Even the name of the party itself represented Merse's careful balancing act between the Mongolian People's Revolutionary Party in independent Mongolia, and the various political parties in China, at a time of Kuomintang-Chinese Communist Party (CCP) cooperation during the First United Front: the Mongolian name echoed the MPRP's Mongolian name, while the Chinese name echoed "Kuomintang".

The KMT-CCP split of 1927 reflected itself into the IMPRP's own internal situation. The party split into two factions under the pro-China Serengdongrub and the pro-Ulaanbaatar/Moscow Merse (though Ulanhu would later try to frame this purely as a split between KMT and CCP supporters). Merse and other left-wing elements within the party took steps towards more radical action: organising an armed uprising. Comintern agent Ivan P. Stepanov promised them arms and funding. Thus, in 1928, Merse and his Daur compatriot Fumintai (福明泰 or 敖民泰) led a group of Barga Mongols in an uprising in his hometown Hailar, attempting to establish local autonomy. Sources refer to this by a variety of names, including the "Hulunbuir Uprising" and "Barga Rebellion". However, the Comintern repudiated Stepanov's statement, and the Mongolian and Soviet governments denied all association with the uprisings, and arrested Merse's associates who had gone to Ulaanbaatar during and after the uprising. No outside support would be forthcoming. The Chinese authorities arrested China Eastern Railway assistant director Mikhail Lashevich in connection with the uprising in August 1928. Merse was thus forced to end his uprising and make peace with Zhang Xueliang in September 1929. The Barga, for their part, fled to independent Mongolia, where they would become the target of political repressions in the next decade.

In the aftermath, Merse himself became a teacher at the Northeast Normal School for the Mongolian Banners at Mukden. He also worked as Zhang's personal secretary. He repudiated the Soviet Union in published articles. He also stepped back from his promotion of Inner Mongolian independence, instead seeking greater autonomy under the Republic of China. His views on religion also seemed to have softened from his earlier communist-influenced hard line against feudalism and Buddhism; during the visit of Thubten Choekyi Nyima, 9th Panchen Lama to Mukden, he began to realise the value of religious figures in drawing support for the nationalist movement. He would go on to accompany Demchugdongrub in a visit to the Panchen Lama at Beijing, a meeting which resulted in their offer to build monasteries in Jerim League and Xilin Gol League. Finally, during these years he also worked on a translation of the Secret History of the Mongols.

== Disappearance ==
After the Mukden Incident in 1931, Merse disappeared from public view. Owen Lattimore claimed that Zhang Xueliang, fearing that Merse would be used to convince other Mongols to support the Japanese, had him assassinated. Later authors, though agreeing with the possibility that Zhang held such views, dismiss the assassination claims; they instead state that Merse went to the Soviet consulate in Manzhouli. Another source reports that he indeed instructed two associates, Khafengga and Buyanmandukhu, to try to obtain material support from the Japanese to organise a Mongolian autonomous army in eastern Inner Mongolia as a ruse, and once done head west to support the anti-Japanese movement. Another account states that he went to Ulaanbaatar in 1932 to try to obtain support for his plans.

There was no news of him after that for more than half a century. However, his name appeared in KGB files released in May 1989 when he was rehabilitated. According to those records, Merse was arrested due to his nationalistic tendencies, taken to the Soviet Union, charged with spying for Inner Mongolia and attempting to escape imprisonment, and sentenced to death. His sentence was reduced to 10 years' imprisonment in October 1934, and he was sent to the Gulag, but the records do not record his eventual fate.

== Legacy ==
In the immediate aftermath of the Hulunbuir Uprising, internal CPC documents gave a rather positive evaluation of Merse, describing him and the other members of the IMPRP's left-wing faction as having gained widespread popular support through their mass work. However, later PRC historiography of Inner Mongolia up to the late 1990s portrayed Merse as a villain, a "splittist", and even a rightist like Serengdongrub. However, Daur in the PRC increasingly viewed him as a hero beginning in the 1980s. The 1986 Brief Daur History described him positively. The following year, the Daur History and Language Working Group issued a reprint of his 1929 lectures on "the Mongolian problem". A bust of him stands in a public square in the Morin Dawa Daur Autonomous Banner. His position on the question of the Daur's status as an ethnic group separate from the Mongols remained an open question, with some suggesting he intended for the Daurs to be completely "Mongolised".

== Bibliography ==
- 郭道甫 — Guo Daofu (1987) [1929], 蒙古问题讲演录 — Lectures on the Mongolian Problem, Inner Mongolia Autonomous Region: 达斡尔历史语言文学会 — Daur History and Language Association, OCLC 31403502
- Li, Narangoa; Cribb, R. B. (2003), Imperial Japan and national identities in Asia, 1895-1945, Nordic Institute of Asian Studies monograph series, Routledge, ISBN 978-0-7007-1482-7
- Liu, Xiaoyuan (2006), Reins of liberation: an entangled history of Mongolian independence, Chinese territoriality, and great power hegemony, 1911-1950, Stanford University Press, ISBN 978-0-8047-5426-2
- Morozova, Irina Yurievna (2009), Socialist revolutions in Asia: the social history of Mongolia in the 20th century, Taylor and Francis, ISBN 978-0-7103-1351-5
- Uradyn Erden Bulag (2002), The Mongols at China's edge: history and the politics of national unity, Rowman and Littlefield
- Uradyn Erden Bulag (2007), "From Empire to Nation: the Demise of Buddhism in Inner Mongolia", The Mongolia-Tibet interface: opening new research terrains in Inner Asia — Proceedings of the Tenth Seminar of the International Association for Tibetan Studies, Oxford, 2003, Brill, pp. 19–58, ISBN 978-90-04-15521-3
