= 2025 Africa Eco Race =

16th edition of the Africa Eco Race in 2025

Part of the Africa Eco Race
← Previous event	Next event →
- Host country: Monaco, Morocco, Mauritania and Senegal
- Dates run: 28 December 2024–12 January 2025
- Start: Monaco
- Finish: (Senegal) Dakar
- Stages: 11 (3,564 km; 2,215 mi)
- Stage surface: Gravel, sand
- Overall distance: 5,979 km (3,715 mi)

Results
- Moto winner: (Italy) Jacopo Cerutti; Aprilia
- Autos winner: (France) Benoit Fretin (France) Cedric Duple; Century
- Historic winner: (Belgium) Éric Claeys (Belgium) Tom Claeys; Toyota
- Crews: 89 at start, 69 at finish

The 2025 Africa Eco Race is the 16th edition of the rally raid in North Africa. Departing from Monaco on 28 December 2024 it travelled through Morocco, Mauritania, and finished in Senegal after travelling by boat from France.

== Summary ==
Stage 7 was neutralized after the 241 km refuel point because the organization's plane had a technical fault and crashed into a fuel truck while it was refuelling Andrea Perfetti's bike. Perfetti was seriously injured, airlifted to hospital, and suffered a concussion.

Stage 9 was cancelled due to a sandstorm from the night of Wednesday 8th through Thursday 9th. The starting location was moved 50 km from the original location, but it was decided it is still too high risk. Race director Manfred Kroiss stated the safety concerns including the competitors not being able to be rested enough, and low visibility. The Historic and Raid categories continued with a shortened stage due to their lower speeds and lower risks.

Stage 12 is a ceremonial special stage to celebrate reaching Lac Rose and, while timed, does not add any time to the general classification.

== Entry list ==
89 vehicles lined up at the start of the race event which include 78 motorcycles (1 quad) and 11 SSVs, cars, and trucks. These were accompanied by 9 cars and 1 truck in the historic category.

69 vehicles finished the event, including 60 motorcycles, 4 cars, 3 SSVs, and 2 trucks. 8 historic vehicles finished the event.

Entry list — Bikes

Categories and Classes

Main article: Africa_Eco_Race § Motorcycle_Category

No.	Driver	Bike	Team	Category	Class
1	(Italy) Jacopo Cerutti	Aprilia Tuareg 660	Aprilia Racing Gcorse	3	
2	(Norway) Pål Anders Ullevålseter	KTM 450 Rally Factory Replica	Team Norwit	1	V
3	(Italy) Alessandro Botturi	Yamaha Ténéré 700	Yamaha Tenere World Raid Team	3	V
5	(Spain) Joan Pedrero	Harley-Davidson Pan America	Harley-Davidson Pan America	4	
7	(Italy) Marco Menichini	Aprilia Tuareg 660	Aprilia Racing Gcorse	3	
9	(France) Guillaume Borne	Husqvarna 450 Rally Replica	Bb Racing Team	1	
10	(France) Eric Bernard	KTM 890 Adventure R	Ouest Racing	3	V
11	(Slovakia) Martin Benko	KTM 450 Rally Factory Replica	Norwit Racing	1	V
12	(Czech Republic) Jiri Kalat	KTM 450 Rally Factory Replica	Norwit Racing	1	V
13	(Andorra) Pol Tarrés	Yamaha Ténéré 700	Yamaha Tenere World Raid Team	3	
14	(Italy) Filippo Pietri	Kove 450 Rally	Solarys Racing	1	R
15	(France) Christian Punginelli	KTM 450 Rally Factory Replica	Pro Shop	1	V M
17	(Italy) Matteo Bottino	Kove 800x Rally Ls	Kove Italia Racing Team	3	R
18	(France) Patrice Carillon	KTM 450 Rally Factory Replica	Pcaventure	1	V M
19	(Italy) Francesco Puocci	KTM 690 Rally	Team Puocci	2	V M
20	(Italy) Francesco Catanese	Yamaha T700	Tuttogru	3	V
21	(Italy) Iarno D'orsogna	Yamaha Ténéré 700	Yamaha Tenere World Raid Team	3	R
22	(Italy) Francesco Montanari	Aprilia Tuareg 660	Aprilia Racing Gcorse	3	
23	(France) Attilio Fert	Yamaha Ténéré 700	Yamaha Tenere World Raid Team	3	
24	(Belgium) Nicolas Charlier	Yamaha Ténéré 700	Yamaha Tenere World Raid Team	3	
25	(Italy) Lorenzo Busatti	Husqvarna 450 Rally Replica	Lorenzo Busatti	1	V M
26	(France) Stephane Stragliati	Kove 450 Rally	Srt	1	V M
27	(Italy) Paolo Filippini	Husqvarna 450 Rally Replica	Azzurrorosa	1	V
28	(Belgium) Boris Wolters	Husqvarna 450 Rally Replica	Minou Et Minou	1	M
29	(Belgium) Jerome Delforge	Husqvarna 450 Rally Replica	Minou Et Minou	1	M
30	(Sweden) Johan Persson	KTM 450 Rally Factory Replica	Klwn Racing	1	
31	(Sweden) Daniel Mattsson	Husqvarna 450 Rally Replica	Klwn Racing	1	V
32	(France) Thierry Costard	KTM 450 Rally Factory Replica	Ldz56	1	V
33	(France) Maxence Costard	KTM 450 Rally Factory Replica	Ldz56	1	R
34	(France) James Simonin	Husqvarna 450 Rally Replica	Adventure World	1	M
35	(Italy) Stefano Bilato	KTM 890 Adventure R	Energia E Sorrisi	3	
36	(France) Steve Perlinski	KTM Rally Factory Replica	Team Perlinski	1	
37	(Belgium) Tony Van Cauwenberghe	KTM EXC-f 450	Team Perlinski	1	
38	(France) Michel Lhermenier	Gas Gas RX 450F Rally Replica	Team Esm	1	V
39	(Italy) Diego Marchesini	Kove 450 Rally	Energia & Sorrisi Odv	1	V
40	(United Kingdom) Richard Kaye	KTM 450 Rally Factory Replica	Rally Adventure Team / Enduro Greece	1	V M
41	(Italy) Alessandro Rigoni	Husqvarna 450 Rally Replica	Solarys Racing	1	V
42	(Italy) Daniele Livi	Kove 450 Rally	Solarys Racing	1	
44	(Italy) Giampietro Dal Ben	Kove 450 Rally	Energia & Sorrisi Odv	1	V
45	(Italy) Gianni Moretto	Kove 450 Rally	Energia & Sorrisi Odv	1	V
46	(Belgium) Jean-yves Sottiaux	Kove 450 Rally	Jean-yves Sottiaux	1	M
47	(France) Roch Wolville	Husqvarna 450 Rally Replica	Aumiot Motos	1	V
48	(France) Xavier Tholy	Husqvarna 450 FE	Xavier Tholy	1	V
49	(Switzerland) Richard Borer	KTM 450 Rally Factory Replica	Ch Racing	1	V
50	(Norway) Kristian Dovland Hans	KTM 450 Rally Factory Replica	Dovland2da Kar	1	M R
52	(Czech Republic) Jan Vondrášek	Gas Gas RX 450F Rally Replica	Dr.k	1	
52	(Czech Republic) Jiří Blažek	KTM 450 Rally Factory Replica	Dr.k	1	
53	(Sweden) Anders Berglund	KTM 450 Rally Factory Replica	Anders Berglund	1	V M
54	(France) Matthieu Brabant	Triumph Tiger 900 Rally Pro	Mat T Adventure	3	M R
55	(Italy) Claudio Fiorini	KTM 450 Rally Factory Replica	Fiorini	1	M
58	(Italy) Andrea Perfetti	Moto Honda CRF 450 Rs2	Rs	1	V
59	(Japan) Shinya Fujiwara	Gas Gas RX 450F Rally Replica	Smrp With Bivouac Osaka	1	M
60	(Japan) Yuki Fujiwara	Husqvarna 450 Rally Replica	Smrp With Bivouac Osaka	1	R
61	(Italy) Mirco Bettini	Suzuki V-Strom 800DE	Azzurrorosa	3	V
62	(Japan) Junichi Oshitamoto	Husqvarna FE 501	Smrp With Bivouac Osaka	2	V
63	(Japan) Ai Tanaka	Husqvarna FE 501	Kisarazu Base	2	F
64	(France) Geoffroy Lemercier	KTM 450 Rally Factory Replica	Geoff’road	1	V M
65	(Japan) Akihiro Saito	Husqvarna FE 501	Kisarazu Base	2	V
66	(Japan) Yuji Kahara	Husqvarna 450 Rally Replica	Smrp With Bivouac Osaka	1	
67	(France) Laurent Cochet	Yamaha Ténéré 700	Yamaha Tenere World Raid Team	3	
68	(Japan) Shingo Sugimura	Gas Gas RX 450F Rally Replica	Smrp With Bivouac Osaka	1	
69	(Italy) Ivan Besenzoni	Husqvarna 450 Rally Replica	J.b.r.ally Asd	1	V M
71	(Italy) Massimiliano Guerrini	Husqvarna 450 Rally Replica	Solarys Racing	1	V
72	(Italy) Palmer Carmelo	Kove 450 Rally	Calabria Adventure	1	V M
75	(Spain) Guillem Martinez Boronat	KTM 450 Rally Factory Replica	Senegal Team	1	M R
77	(Norway) Vegar Pettersen	KTM 450 Rally Factory Replica	Doctorbraap Racing	1	V M
79	(Italy) Pierpaolo Vivaldi	Gas Gas RX 450F Rally Replica	Energia & Sorrisi Odv	1	V
80	(Belgium) Mathieu Liebaert	KTM 450 Rally Factory Replica	Rvegraphecool Racing	1	R
82	(United Kingdom) Stephanie Rowe	KTM 450 EXCf	Petokask	1	F M
83	(France) Vincent Biau	Suzuki V-Strom 800DE	Petokask	3	M
84	(France) Michel Delaye	KTM 890 Rallye	Michel	3	V M
85	(France) Damien Derocq	KTM 450 Rally Factory Replica	Team Derocq Objectif	1	V M
87	(France) Christophe Meillat	Yamaha Tènèrè 700	Yamaha Ténéré Spirit Expérience	3	V
88	(Australia) Scott Britnell	KTM 450 Rally Factory Replica	Grit Adventures	1	V M
89	(France) Thierry Traccan	Yamaha Ténéré 700	Yamaha Tenere World Raid Team	3	
90	(Norway) Joachim Hellsten	KTM 450 Rally Factory Replica	A4+	1	M
91	(Austria) Luca Seppele	Kove 450 Rally	Energia & Sorrisi / Kove Italy	1	R
93	(Italy) Giovanni Gritti	Moto Honda CRF 450 Rs2	Rs	1	V
99	(Belgium) Laurent Hellemans	Yamaha Raptor	Hellau	6 G	

Entry list — SSVs, Cars, Trucks

Categories and Classes

Main article: Africa_Eco_Race § SSV,_Car,_Truck_Category

No.	Driver	Co-Driver	Technician	Vehicle	Team	Category	Class
200	(France) Benoit Fretin	(France) Cedric Duple	No technician	Ydeo Competition	Century CR6	T1	
201	(Netherlands) Vincent Vroninks	(Belgium) Dave Berghmans	No technician	QFF Racing	Red-lined VK56	T1	
202	(Hungary) Imre Varga	(Hungary) Toma József	No technician	Varga Racing Team	Toyota Hilux Overdrive	T1	
203	(Netherlands) Wietse Tates	(Netherlands) Koen Wessling	No technician	Kort Door De Bocht Offroad Racing Team	Bowler Wildcat	T1	
204	(Poland) Magdalena Zajac	(Poland) Blazej Czekan	No technician	Proxcars Tme Rally Team	Toyota Hilux	T1	
207	(Czech Republic) Tomas Ourednicek	(Czech Republic) Lukas Bartak	No technician	Toyota Gazoo Racing Czech	Toyota Hilux GR	T1	
250	(Netherlands) Martijn Van Den Broek	(Netherlands) Jan Paul Van Der Poel	No technician	QFF Racing	Can-Am Maverick X3	SSV Xtreme Race	
251	(France) Pierre Lafay	(France) Gilles De Turckheim	No technician	Team Gazzafond	Can-Am Maverick R	SSV Xtreme Race	
252	(France) Philippe Champigné	(France) Bruno Robin	No technician	Team Aventure 79	Can-Am Maverick XRS	SSV Xtreme Race	
400	(Netherlands) Gerrit Zuurmond	(Netherlands) Tjeerd Van Ballegooij	(Netherlands) Klaas Kwakkel	Rainbow Truck Team	MAN TGS 18.480	T5	1
401	(Netherlands) William Van Groningen	(Netherlands) Wesley Van Groningen	(Netherlands) Raph Van Den Elshout	Dust Warriors	Iveco PowerStar	T5	1

Entry list — Historic

Categories and Classes

Main article: Africa_Eco_Race § Classic

No.	Driver	Co-Driver	Technician	Vehicle	Team	Category	Class
300	(Belgium) Eric Claeys	(Belgium) Tom Claeys	No technician	Toyota Land Cruiser 73	Claeyson	2	
301	(Belgium) Kurt Dujardyn	(Belgium) Rene Declercq	No technician	Bombardier Iltis	VW Iltis Team	1	
302	(France) Fabrice Morin	(France) Magali Morin	No technician	Toyota Land Cruiser	Ydeo Competition	?	
303	(Germany) Marnie Brandenburg	(Germany) Carla Brandenburg	No technician	Porsche 911	911 Racing Team Hamburg	2	
304	(Germany) Dr. Med. Erik Brandenburg	(Germany) Jan Glüsing	No technician	Porsche 911	911 Racing Team Hamburg	2	
305	(Germany) Peter Lehmann	(Germany) Tom Brandenburg	No technician	Porsche 911	911 Racing Team Hamburg	2	
306	(Italy) Maurizio Elia	(Italy) Luisa Zumelli	No technician	Toyota Land Cruiser HDJ100	Modulauto	3	
308	(Germany) Wolfgang Starkloff	(Ukraine) Yurii Kushneruk	(Germany) Oleg Winzer	MAN Truck Kat 1	911 Racing Team Hamburg	Truck	
319	(France) Sylvie David-boulin	(France) Virginie Gobbe-malval	No technician	Nissan Patrol Y60	Les Drôles De Dames Team 4x465	3	
338	(France) Hélène Grand’eury	(France) Séverine Arnaud Ép.dallard	No technician	Toyota KZJ73	Hs Team / Teamroses 38	1	

Entry list — Raid

Categories and Classes

Main article: Africa_Eco_Race § Non-race

No.	Driver	Co-Driver	Technician	Vehicle	Team	Category
518	(France) Xavier Padovani	No co-driver	No technician	KTM 690 Enduro R	Xo Team	Bike
519	(France) Olivier Crovella	No co-driver	No technician	KTM 450 Rally Replica	Xo Team	Bike
521	(Italy) Pietro Bartolomei	No co-driver	No technician	Yamaha Ténéré T700	Rs Moto	Bike
522	(Italy) Stoppel David	No co-driver	No technician	Honda CRF 450 RS2	Rs Moto	Bike
523	(France) Laurent Edouin	No co-driver	No technician	Yamaha XTZ690D	Yamaha Tenere World Raid Team	Bike
524	(France) Christophe Edouin	No co-driver	No technician	Yamaha XTZ690	Yamaha Tenere World Raid Team	Bike
525	(Germany) Reinhold Jakobi	No co-driver	No technician	Yamaha XTZ690D	Yamaha Tenere World Raid Team	Bike
526	(France) Geoffrey Anglaret	No co-driver	No technician	Yamaha XTZ690D	Yamaha Tenere World Raid Team	Bike
527	(France) Willy Jobard	No co-driver	No technician	Arctic Leopard Exe 880 E-rally	Arctic Leopard Factory Racing	Bike
528	(Netherlands) Maarten Buitenhuis	No co-driver	No technician	Arctic Leopard Exe 880 E-rally	Arctic Leopard Factory Racing	Bike
529	(Italy) Piero Picchi	No co-driver	No technician	Ducati Hypermotard 698 Mono	Solarys Racing Maremma Dakar	Bike
550	(France) Christophe Tesson	(France) Karina Tesson	No technician	Quaddy XYZ1000R	Team Sixtyfive	SSV
551	(Canada) Pierre-andré Paquette	(Canada) Julie Gauthier	No technician	Can-Am Maverick R XRS	Team Sixty Five (québec)	SSV
552	(Japan) Yoshimasa Sugawara	(Japan) Naoko Matsumoto	(France) Remy Roquet	Toyota Hilux	Equipe Sugawara	Car
553	(Hungary) Péter Magoss	(Hungary) Erika Kincses	No technician	Toyota Land Cruiser	Magoss	Car
554	(Hungary) Laszlo Mekler	(Hungary) Edit Mekler	No technician	Nissan Navara	Scuderia Coppa Amici	Car
555	(France) Patrick Lahaye	(France) Romain Lahaye	No technician	Toyota Land Cruiser HDJ200	Ultimate	Car
556	(France) Franck Allard	(France) Claude Valion	No technician	Toyota HDJ100	AMV	Car
557	(Spain) Pedro Oller Martínez	(Spain) Antonio Ruiz Castillo	No technician	Toyota HDJ80	Lunattic Team	Car
558	(Hungary) Balazs Szalay	(Hungary) László Bunkóczi	No technician	Isuzu BTF Pick Up	Raid	Car
559	(United States) Balazs Szalay	(Hungary) Domonkos Piukovics	No technician	Mitsubishi Pajero	Sp Dakar Team	Car

== Stages ==
Stage	Date	Start	Finish	Connection (km)	Special (km)	Connection (km)	Total (km)
Technical Check	27 December	(Italy) Bordigheria	(Italy) Camporosso	-	-	-	-
Start Ceremony	28 December	Monaco	(France) Menton	-	-	-	-
Boat Boarding	29 December	(France) Menton	-	-	-	-	-
Boat Disembark	31 December	-	(Morocco) Tangier	-	-	-	-
1	31 December	(Morocco) Tangier	(Morocco) Tarda	708	47		755
2	1 January	(Morocco) Tarda	(Morocco) Tagounite	19	320	19	358
3	2 January	(Morocco) Tagounite	(Morocco) Touizgui	15	452	79	546
4	3 January	(Morocco) Touizgui	(Morocco) Laayoune	92	485	14	591
5	4 January	(Morocco) Laayoune	(Morocco) Dakhla	74	431	124	629
Rest	5 January	Rest day in (Morocco) Dakhla					
6	6 January	(Morocco) Dakhla	(Mauritania) Benichab	368	172	137	677
7	7 January	(Mauritania) Benichab	(Mauritania) Amodjar	7	392	69	468
8	8 January	(Mauritania) Amodjar	(Mauritania) Amodjar	0	351	5	356
~~9~~	~~9 January~~	~~(Mauritania) Amodjar~~	~~(Mauritania) Amodjar~~	~~0~~	~~401~~	~~48~~	~~449~~
10	10 January	(Mauritania) Amodjar	(Mauritania) Nouakchott	54	409	11	474
11	11 January	(Mauritania) Nouakchott	(Senegal) Mpal	317	82	8	407
12	12 January	(Senegal) Mpal	(Senegal) Dakar	203	22	44	269
Totals					3564		5979

== Stage winners ==
Stage	Bikes	Cars	SSV (T4)	Trucks	Historics
Stage 1	(Italy) Jacopo Cerutti	(Poland) Magdalena Zajac	(France) Pierre Lafay	(Netherlands) William Van Groningen	(Belgium) Éric Claeys
Stage 2	(Italy) Alessandro Botturi	(France) Benoit Fretin	(France) Pierre Lafay	(Netherlands) Gerrit Zuurmond	(Belgium) Éric Claeys
Stage 3	(Italy) Jacopo Cerutti	(France) Benoit Fretin	(France) Pierre Lafay	(Netherlands) Gerrit Zuurmond	(Belgium) Éric Claeys
Stage 4	(Italy) Jacopo Cerutti	(France) Benoit Fretin	(France) Pierre Lafay	(Netherlands) William Van Groningen	(Belgium) Éric Claeys
Stage 5	(Belgium) Nicolas Charlier	(Czech Republic) Tomas Ourednicek	(Netherlands) Martijn Van Den Broek	(Netherlands) Gerrit Zuurmond	(Belgium) Éric Claeys
Stage 6	(Italy) Alessandro Botturi	(France) Benoit Fretin	(Netherlands) Martijn Van Den Broek	(Netherlands) William Van Groningen	(Belgium) Kurt Dujardyn
Stage 7	(Italy) Jacopo Cerutti	(France) Benoit Fretin	(France) Pierre Lafay	(Netherlands) Gerrit Zuurmond	(Belgium) Éric Claeys
Stage 8	(Italy) Francesco Montanari	(France) Benoit Fretin	(Netherlands) Martijn Van Den Broek	(Netherlands) Gerrit Zuurmond	(Belgium) Éric Claeys
Stage 9	Stage cancelled	Stage cancelled	Stage cancelled	Stage cancelled	(Belgium) Kurt Dujardyn
Stage 10	(Italy) Jacopo Cerutti	(France) Benoit Fretin	(France) Pierre Lafay	(Netherlands) Gerrit Zuurmond	(Belgium) Éric Claeys
Stage 11	(Italy) Jacopo Cerutti	(France) Benoit Fretin	(France) Pierre Lafay	(Netherlands) William Van Groningen	(Belgium) Éric Claeys
Stage 12	(Italy) Alessandro Botturi	(Poland) Magdalena Zajac	(France) Pierre Lafay	(Netherlands) William Van Groningen	No stage
Rally Winners	(Italy) Jacopo Cerutti	(France) Benoit Fretin	(France) Pierre Lafay	(Netherlands) Gerrit Zuurmond	(Belgium) Éric Claeys

== Stage results ==
=== Bike ===
	Stage result						General classification					
Stage	Pos	Competitor	Make	Class	Time	Gap	Pos	Competitor	Make	Class	Time	Gap
1	1	(Italy) Jacopo Cerutti	Aprilia	Multicylinder	00:38:33		1	(Italy) Jacopo Cerutti	Aprilia	Multicylinder	00:38:33	
1	2	(Italy) Alessandro Botturi	Yamaha	Multicylinder	00:39:28	00:00:55	2	(Italy) Alessandro Botturi	Yamaha	Multicylinder	00:39:28	00:00:55
1	3	(Andorra) Pol Tarres	Yamaha	Multicylinder	00:40:17	00:01:44	3	(Andorra) Pol Tarres	Yamaha	Multicylinder	00:40:17	00:01:44
2	1	(Italy) Alessandro Botturi	Yamaha	Multicylinder	03:44:46		1	(Italy) Alessandro Botturi	Yamaha	Multicylinder	04:24:14	
2	2	(Italy) Jacopo Cerutti	Aprilia	Multicylinder	03:47:38	00:02:52	2	(Italy) Jacopo Cerutti	Aprilia	Multicylinder	04:26:11	00:01:57
2	3	(Italy) Francesco Montanari	Yamaha	Multicylinder	04:17:33	00:32:47	3	(France) Guillaume Borne	Husqvarna	450	05:01:39	00:37:25
3	1	(Italy) Jacopo Cerutti	Aprilia	Multicylinder	06:08:21		1	(Italy) Jacopo Cerutti	Aprilia	Multicylinder	10:34:32	
3	2	(Italy) Alessandro Botturi	Yamaha	Multicylinder	06:11:40	00:03:19	2	(Italy) Alessandro Botturi	Yamaha	Multicylinder	10:35:54	00:01:22
3	3	(Italy) Francesco Montanari	Yamaha	Multicylinder	06:30:25	00:22:04	3	(Italy) Francesco Montanari	Yamaha	Multicylinder	11:35:18	00:59:24
4	1	(Italy) Alessandro Botturi	Yamaha	Multicylinder	05:24:36		1	(Italy) Alessandro Botturi	Yamaha	Multicylinder	16:00:30	
4	2	(Italy) Jacopo Cerutti	Aprilia	Multicylinder	05:27:26	00:02:50	2	(Italy) Jacopo Cerutti	Aprilia	Multicylinder	16:01:58	00:01:28
4	3	(Norway) Pål Anders Ullevålseter	KTM	450	05:48:55	00:24:19	3	(Norway) Pål Anders Ullevålseter	KTM	450	17:34:49	01:34:19
5	1	(Belgium) Nicolas Charlier	Yamaha	Multicylinder	04:08:24		1	(Italy) Jacopo Cerutti	Aprilia	Multicylinder	20:57:40	
5	2	(Italy) Francesco Montanari	Yamaha	Multicylinder	04:10:54	00:02:30	2	(Italy) Alessandro Botturi	Yamaha	Multicylinder	20:59:10	00:01:30
5	3	(Italy) Massimilano Guerrini	Husqvarna	450	04:11:48	00:03:24	3	(Italy) Massimilano Guerrini	Husqvarna	450	22:20:02	01:22:22
6	1	(Italy) Alessandro Botturi	Yamaha	Multicylinder	01:31:45		1	(Italy) Alessandro Botturi	Yamaha	Multicylinder	22:30:55	
6	2	(Norway) Pål Anders Ullevålseter	KTM	450	01:34:41	00:02:56	2	(Italy) Jacopo Cerutti	Aprilia	Multicylinder	22:46:25	00:15:30
6	3	(Italy) Iarno D'Orsogna	Yamaha	Multicylinder	01:35:19	00:03:34	3	(France) Guillaume Borne	Husqvarna	450	24:07:52	01:36:57
7	1	(Italy) Jacopo Cerutti	Aprilia	Multicylinder	02:51:54		1	(Italy) Alessandro Botturi	Yamaha	Multicylinder	25:31:26	
7	2	(Italy) Alessandro Botturi	Yamaha	Multicylinder	03:00:31	00:08:37	2	(Italy) Jacopo Cerutti	Aprilia	Multicylinder	25:38:19	00:06:53
7	3	(Australia) Scott Britnell	KTM	450	03:01:20	00:09:26	3	(France) Guillaume Borne	Husqvarna	450	27:38:06	02:06:40
8	1	(Italy) Francesco Montanari	Yamaha	Multicylinder	04:16:27		1	(Italy) Alessandro Botturi	Yamaha	Multicylinder	30:10:46	
8	2	(Norway) Pål Anders Ullevålseter	KTM	450	04:19:22	00:02:55	2	(Italy) Jacopo Cerutti	Aprilia	Multicylinder	30:20:35	00:49:49
8	3	(France) Guillaume Borne	Husqvarna	450	04:28:18	00:11:51	3	(Italy) Francesco Montanari	Yamaha	Multicylinder	31:57:00	01:46:14
9	Stage cancelled											
10	1	(Italy) Jacopo Cerutti	Aprilia	Multicylinder	04:52:41		1	(Italy) Alessandro Botturi	Yamaha	Multicylinder	35:13:07	
10	2	(Italy) Alessandro Botturi	Yamaha	Multicylinder	05:02:21	00:09:40	2	(Italy) Jacopo Cerutti	Aprilia	Multicylinder	35:13:16	00:00:09
10	3	(Belgium) Mathieu Liebaert	KTM	450	05:17:05	00:24:24	3	(Spain) Guillem Martinez Boronat	KTM	450	37:39:11	02:26:04
11	1	(Italy) Jacopo Cerutti	Aprilia	Multicylinder	01:01:54		1	(Italy) Jacopo Cerutti	Aprilia	Multicylinder	36:15:10	
11	2	(Italy) Alessandro Botturi	Yamaha	Multicylinder	01:02:29	00:00:35	2	(Italy) Alessandro Botturi	Yamaha	Multicylinder	36:15:36	00:00:26
11	3	(France) Guillaume Borne	Husqvarna	450	01:05:30	00:03:36	3	(France) Guillaume Borne	Husqvarna	450	38:46:35	02:31:25
12	1	(Italy) Alessandro Botturi	Yamaha	Multicylinder	00:11:57							
12	2	(Norway) Pål Anders Ullevålseter	KTM	450	00:12:16	00:00:19						
12	3	(Italy) Jacopo Cerutti	Aprilia	Multicylinder	00:12:38	00:00:41						

=== SSV, Car, Truck ===
	Stage result						General classification					
Stage	Pos	Competitor	Make	Class	Time	Gap	Pos	Competitor	Make	Class	Time	Gap
1	1	(France) Pierre Lafay	Can-Am	SSV	00:39:53		1	(France) Pierre Lafay	Can-Am	SSV	00:39:53	
1	2	(Poland) Magdalena Zajac	Toyota	T1.1	00:40:17	00:00:24	2	(Poland) Magdalena Zajac	Toyota	T1.1	00:40:17	00:00:24
1	3	(Belgium) Vincent Vroninks	Red-Lined	T1.1	00:41:03	00:01:10	3	(Belgium) Vincent Vroninks	Red-Lined	T1.1	00:41:03	00:01:10
2	1	(France) Benoit Fretin	Century	T1.3	03:50:48		1	(France) Benoit Fretin	Century	T1.3	04:33:03	
2	2	(Belgium) Vincent Vroninks	Red-Lined	T1.1	04:02:59	00:12:11	2	(Belgium) Vincent Vroninks	Red-Lined	T1.1	04:44:02	00:10:59
2	3	(France) Pierre Lafay	Can-Am	SSV	04:07:30	00:16:42	3	(France) Pierre Lafay	Can-Am	SSV	04:47:23	00:14:20
3	1	(France) Benoit Fretin	Century	T1.3	06:04:10		1	(France) Benoit Fretin	Century	T1.3	10:37:13	
3	2	(Czech Republic) Tomas Ourednicek	Toyota	T1.1	06:11:57	00:07:47	2	(Belgium) Vincent Vroninks	Red-Lined	T1.1	11:02:16	00:25:03
3	3	(Belgium) Vincent Vroninks	Red-Lined	T1.1	06:18:14	00:14:04	3	(Czech Republic) Tomas Ourednicek	Toyota	T1.1	11:15:25	00:38:12
4	1	(France) Benoit Fretin	Century	T1.3	05:17:17		1	(France) Benoit Fretin	Century	T1.3	15:54:30	
4	2	(Czech Republic) Tomas Ourednicek	Toyota	T1.1	05:21:51	00:04:34	2	(Belgium) Vincent Vroninks	Red-Lined	T1.1	16:24:56	00:30:26
4	3	(Belgium) Vincent Vroninks	Red-Lined	T1.1	05:22:40	00:05:23	3	(Czech Republic) Tomas Ourednicek	Toyota	T1.1	16:37:16	00:42:46
5	1	(Czech Republic) Tomas Ourednicek	Toyota	T1.1	03:28:03		1	(France) Benoit Fretin	Century	T1.3	19:24:07	
5	2	(France) Benoit Fretin	Century	T1.3	03:29:37	00:01:34	2	(Czech Republic) Tomas Ourednicek	Toyota	T1.1	20:05:19	00:41:12
5	3	(Poland) Magdalena Zajac	Toyota	T1.1	03:41:09	00:13:06	3	(France) Pierre Lafay	Can-Am	SSV	20:49:34	01:25:27
6	1	(France) Benoit Fretin	Century	T1.3	01:22:46		1	(France) Benoit Fretin	Century	T1.3	20:46:53	
6	2	(Poland) Magdalena Zajac	Toyota	T1.1	01:25:57	00:03:11	2	(Netherlands) Martijn Van Den Broek	Can-Am	SSV	24:40:36	03:53:43
6	3	(Netherlands) William Van Groningen	Iveco	T5	01:36:21	00:13:35	3	(France) Pierre Lafay	Can-Am	SSV	24:49:35	04:02:42
7	1	(France) Pierre Lafay	Can-Am	SSV	00:54:32		1	(France) Benoit Fretin	Century	T1.3	21:43:40	
7	2	(France) Benoit Fretin	Century	T1.3	00:56:47	00:02:15	2	(Netherlands) Martijn Van Den Broek	Can-Am	SSV	25:43:59	04:00:19
7	3	(France) Philippe Champigné	Can-Am	SSV	00:59:34	00:05:02	3	(France) Pierre Lafay	Can-Am	SSV	25:44:07	04:00:27
8	1	(France) Benoit Fretin	Century	T1.3	04:27:26		1	(France) Benoit Fretin	Century	T1.3	26:11:06	
8	2	(Netherlands) Martijn Van Den Broek	Can-Am	SSV	04:34:44	00:07:18	2	(Netherlands) Martijn Van Den Broek	Can-Am	SSV	30:18:43	04:07:37
8	3	(Poland) Magdalena Zajac	Toyota	T1.1	04:41:40	00:14:14	3	(France) Pierre Lafay	Can-Am	SSV	31:02:51	04:51:45
9	Stage cancelled											
10	1	(France) Pierre Lafay	Can-Am	SSV	05:06:44		1	(France) Benoit Fretin	Century	T1.3	31:26:23	
10	2	(France) Benoit Fretin	Century	T1.3	05:15:17	00:08:33	2	(Netherlands) Martijn Van Den Broek	Can-Am	SSV	36:03:38	04:37:15
10	3	(Netherlands) Martijn Van Den Broek	Can-Am	SSV	05:44:55	00:38:11	3	(France) Pierre Lafay	Can-Am	SSV	37:39:11	04:43:12
11	1	(France) Pierre Lafay	Can-Am	SSV	01:03:33		1	(France) Benoit Fretin	Century	T1.3	32:36:30	
11	2	(France) Benoit Fretin	Century	T1.3	01:10:07	00:06:34	2	(France) Pierre Lafay	Can-Am	SSV	37:13:08	04:36:38
11	3	(Hungary) Varga Imre	Toyota	T1.1	01:11:02	00:07:29	3	(Netherlands) Martijn Van Den Broek	Can-Am	SSV	37:15:13	04:38:43
12	1	(Poland) Magdalena Zajac	Toyota	T1.1	00:11:52							
12	2	(Hungary) Varga Imre	Toyota	T1.1	00:12:57	00:01:05						
12	3	(France) Benoit Fretin	Century	T1.3	00:13:26	00:01:34						

=== Historic ===
	Stage result					General classification				
Stage	Pos	Competitor	Make	Points	Gap	Pos	Competitor	Make	Points	Gap
1	1	(Belgium) Éric Claeys	Toyota	8		1	(Belgium) Éric Claeys	Toyota	8	
1	2	(Belgium) Kurt Dujardyn	Volkswagen	9	+1	2	(Belgium) Kurt Dujardyn	Volkswagen	9	+1
1	3	(France) Fabrice Morin	Toyota	129	+101	3	(France) Fabrice Morin	Toyota	129	+101
2	1	(Belgium) Éric Claeys	Toyota	83		1	(Belgium) Éric Claeys	Toyota	91	
2	2	(Belgium) Kurt Dujardyn	Volkswagen	114	+31	2	(Belgium) Kurt Dujardyn	Volkswagen	123	+32
2	3	(France) Fabrice Morin	Toyota	1970	+1856	3	(France) Fabrice Morin	Toyota	2099	+2008
3	1	(Belgium) Éric Claeys	Toyota	390		1	(Belgium) Éric Claeys	Toyota	481	
3	2	(France) Fabrice Morin	Toyota	1287	+897	2	(Belgium) Kurt Dujardyn	Volkswagen	1539	+1058
3	3	(Belgium) Kurt Dujardyn	Volkswagen	1425	+1035	3	(France) Fabrice Morin	Toyota	3257	+2776
4	1	(Belgium) Éric Claeys	Toyota	124		1	(Belgium) Éric Claeys	Toyota	605	
4	2	(Belgium) Kurt Dujardyn	Volkswagen	136	+12	2	(Belgium) Kurt Dujardyn	Volkswagen	1675	+1070
4	3	(Italy) Maurizio Elia	Toyota	2720	+2596	3	(France) Fabrice Morin	Toyota	7818	+7213
5	1	(Belgium) Éric Claeys	Toyota	0		1	(Belgium) Éric Claeys	Toyota	605	
5	2	(Belgium) Kurt Dujardyn	Volkswagen	94	+94	2	(Belgium) Kurt Dujardyn	Volkswagen	1769	+1164
5	3	(France) Sylvie David-Boulin	Nissan	242	+242	3	(France) Fabrice Morin	Toyota	8923	+8318
6	1	(Belgium) Kurt Dujardyn	Volkswagen	20		1	(Belgium) Éric Claeys	Toyota	677	
6	2	(Belgium) Éric Claeys	Toyota	72	+52	2	(Belgium) Kurt Dujardyn	Volkswagen	1789	+1112
6	3	(France) Hélène Grand'Eury	Toyota	101	+81	3	(France) Fabrice Morin	Toyota	9757	+9080
7	1	(Belgium) Éric Claeys	Toyota	141		1	(Belgium) Éric Claeys	Toyota	818	
7	2	(Belgium) Kurt Dujardyn	Volkswagen	223	+82	2	(Belgium) Kurt Dujardyn	Volkswagen	2012	+1194
7	3	(France) Fabrice Morin	Toyota	1092	+951	3	(France) Fabrice Morin	Toyota	10849	+10031
8	1	(Belgium) Éric Claeys	Toyota	0		1	(Belgium) Éric Claeys	Toyota	818	
8	2	(Belgium) Kurt Dujardyn	Volkswagen	0	+0	2	(Belgium) Kurt Dujardyn	Volkswagen	2012	+1194
8	3	(France) Fabrice Morin	Toyota	0	+0	3	(France) Fabrice Morin	Toyota	10849	+10031
9	1	(Belgium) Kurt Dujardyn	Volkswagen	26		1	(Belgium) Éric Claeys	Toyota	845	
9	2	(Belgium) Éric Claeys	Toyota	27	+1	2	(Belgium) Kurt Dujardyn	Volkswagen	2038	+1193
9	3	(France) Hélène Grand'Eury	Toyota	277	+251	3	(France) Fabrice Morin	Toyota	11226	+10381
10	1	(Belgium) Éric Claeys	Toyota	507		1	(Belgium) Éric Claeys	Toyota	1352	
10	2	(Belgium) Kurt Dujardyn	Volkswagen	635	+128	2	(Belgium) Kurt Dujardyn	Volkswagen	2673	+1321
10	3	(France) Fabrice Morin	Toyota	3487	+2980	3	(France) Fabrice Morin	Toyota	14713	+13361
11	1	(Belgium) Éric Claeys	Toyota	52		1	(Belgium) Éric Claeys	Toyota	1404	
11	2	(Belgium) Kurt Dujardyn	Volkswagen	141	+89	2	(Belgium) Kurt Dujardyn	Volkswagen	2814	+1410
11	3	(France) Sylvie David-Boulin	Nissan	559	+507	3	(France) Fabrice Morin	Toyota	15618	+14214

== Final standings ==
=== Moto ===
Pos	No.	Rider	Make	Class	Time	Gap	Penalty
1	1	(Italy) Jacopo Cerutti	Aprilia	Multicylinder	36:15:10		
2	3	(Italy) Alessandro Botturi	Yamaha	Multicylinder	36:15:36	00:00:26	
3	9	(France) Guillaume Borne	Husqvarna	450	38:46:35	02:31:25	-00:06:44
4	75	(Spain) Guillem Martinez Boronat	KTM	450	38:47:56	02:32:46	
5	80	(Belgium) Mathieu Liebaert	KTM	450	39:09:40	02:54:30	
6	7	(Italy) Marco Menichini	Aprilia	Multicylinder	39:13:20	02:58:10	+00:00:02
7	2	(Norway) Pål Anders Ullevålseter	KTM	450	39:17:29	03:02:19	
8	5	(Spain) Joan Pedrero	Harley-Davidson	Multicylinder +1000	40:39:54	04:24:44	
9	88	(Australia) Scott Britnell	KTM	450	40:44:35	04:29:25	+00:00:15
10	30	(Sweden) Johan Persson	KTM	450	41:43:30	05:28:20	

	Under 450cc			Over 450cc			Multicylinder			1000cc multicylinder			Motul Xtreme		
Pos	No.	Rider	Make	No.	Rider	Make	No.	Rider	Make	No.	Rider	Make	No.	Rider	Make
1st place, gold medalist(s)	9	(France) Guillaume Borne	Husqvarna	62	(Japan) Junichi Oshitamoto	Husqvarna	1	(Italy) Jacopo Cerutti	Aprilia	105	(Spain) Juan Pedrero Garcia	Harley-Davidson	75	(Spain) Guillem Martinez Boronat	KTM
2nd place, silver medalist(s)	75	(Spain) Guillem Martinez Boronat	KTM	Only 1 finisher 1x DNF, 2x DSQ			3	(Italy) Alessandro Botturi	Yamaha	Only 1 entry			88	(Australia) Scott Britnell	KTM
3rd place, bronze medalist(s)	80	(Belgium) Mathieu Liebaert	KTM	Only 1 finisher 1x DNF, 2x DSQ			7	(Italy) Marco Menichini	Aprilia	Only 1 entry			50	(Norway) Kristian Dovland Hans	KTM

Class	No.	Rider	Make
Female	82	(United Kingdom) Stephanie Rowe	KTM
Junior (under 25)	7	(Italy) Marco Menichini	Aprilia
Veteran (over 40)	3	(Italy) Alessandro Botturi	Yamaha
Rookie	75	(Spain) Guillem Martinez Boronat	KTM

=== Auto ===
Pos	No.	Driver Co-Driver	Make	Class	Time	Gap	Penalty
1	200	(France) Benoit Fretin (France) Cedric Duple	Century	T1.3	32:36:30		-01:23:37
2	251	(France) Pierre Lafay (France) Gilles De Turckheim	Can-Am	SSV	37:13:08	04:36:38	+00:00:05
3	250	(Netherlands) Martijn Van Den Broek (Netherlands) Jan Paul Van Der Poel	Can-Am	SSV	37:15:13	04:38:43	+00:00:30
4	400	(Netherlands) Gerrit Zuurmond (Netherlands) Tjeerd Van Ballegooij (Netherlands) Kwakkel Klaas	MAN	T5.1	39:34:12	06:57:42	
5	401	(Netherlands) William Van Groningen (Netherlands) Wesley Van Groningen (Netherlands) Raph Van Den Elshout	Iveco	T5.1	41:35:30	08:59:00	-00:07:15
6	252	(France) Philippe Champigné (France) Bruno Robin	Can-Am	SSV	52:46:31	20:10:01	+08:30:00
7	204	(Poland) Magdalena Zajac (Poland) Blazej Czekan	Toyota	T1.1	53:39:35	21:03:05	+07:30:00
8	203	(Netherlands) Wietse Tates (Netherlands) Koen Wessling	Bowler	T1.1	59:06:21	26:29:51	+08:00:00
9	202	(Hungary) Varga Imre (Hungary) Jozsef Toma	Toyota	T1.1	59:30:06	26:53:36	+11:15:00

Class	No.	Rider	Make
SSV	251	(France) Pierre Lafay (France) Gilles De Turckheim	Can-Am
Truck	400	(Netherlands) Gerrit Zuurmond (Netherlands) Tjeerd Van Ballegooij (Netherlands) Kwakkel Klaas	MAN

=== Historic ===
Pos	No.	Driver Co-Driver	Make	Class	Group	Total	Gap	Penalty
1	300	(Belgium) Eric Claeys (Belgium) Tom Claeys	Toyota	G1	4x4	1404		
2	301	(Belgium) Kurt Dujardyn (Belgium) Rene Declercq	Bombardier	G1	4x4	2814	1410	
3	302	(France) Fabrice Morin (France) Magali Morin	Toyota	G3	4x4	15618	14214	
4	338	(France) Hélène Grand’eury (France) Séverine Arnaud Ép.dallard	Toyota	G2	4x4	21991	20587	
5	306	(Italy) Maurizio Elia (Italy) Luisa Zumelli	Toyota	G3	4x4	27439	26035	
6	319	(France) Sylvie David-Boulin (France) Virginie Gobbe-Malval	Nissan	G2	4x4	28284	26880	
7	305	(Germany) Peter Lehmann (Germany) Tom Brandenburg	Porsche	G1	4x2	43448	42044	4600
8	303	(Germany) Marnie Brandenburg (Germany) Carla Brandenburg	Porsche	G1	4x2	49807	48403	4600

Class	No.	Rider	Make
G2	338	(France) Hélène Grand’eury (France) Séverine Arnaud Ép.dallard	Toyota
G3	302	(France) Fabrice Morin (France) Magali Morin	Toyota
4x2	305	(Germany) Peter Lehmann (Germany) Tom Brandenburg	Porsche
Female	338	(France) Hélène Grand’eury (France) Séverine Arnaud Ép.dallard	Toyota
