= Harley-Davidson Bronx =

Cancelled motorcycle

The Bronx was a motorcycle announced by Harley-Davidson in 2018 for the 2020 model year, alongside the adventure motorcycle-styled Pan America. The Bronx was originally delayed to late 2021 but has since been removed from Harley-Davidson's website. Had it launched, it would have been powered by the all-new liquid-cooled 975cc 60° Revolution Max V-twin engine, and feature streetfighter styling. Although highly anticipated, the model was cancelled in favor of the 2022 RH975 Nightster.
