= 2026 Africa Eco Race =

17th edition of the Africa Eco Race in 2026

Part of the Africa Eco Race
← Previous event	Next event →
- Host country: Morocco, Mauritania and Senegal
- Dates run: 25 January 2026–7 February 2026
- Start: Morocco
- Finish: (Senegal) Dakar
- Stages: 12
- Stage surface: Gravel, sand

Results
- Bike winner: (Germany) Kevin Gallas; Yamaha
- SSV winner: (Netherlands) Martijn Van Den Broek (Netherlands) Mike Daas; Can-Am
- Car winner: (France) David Gerard (France) Pascal Delacour; MD Optimus
- Truck winner: (Netherlands) Gerrit Zuurmond (Netherlands) Tjeerd Van Ballegooij (Netherlands) Klaas Kwakkel; MAN
- Historic winner: (Argentina) Jorge Perez Companc (Argentina) Ezequiel Perez Companc; Toyota
- Crews: 172 at start, 124 at finish

The 2026 Africa Eco Race was the 17th edition of the rally raid in North Africa. Departing from Tangier on 25 January 2026 it travelled through Morocco, Mauritania, and finished in Senegal. This is the first event that started the race on the African continent rather than Europe.

== Summary ==
Due to unfortunate weather conditions the event started with difficulties. The crossing from Marseille to Tangier was affected because of rough seas, the beach Prologue was cancelled due to rain, and Stage 1 had to be cancelled because of heavy snowfall resulting in a diversion liaison of nearly 1,000 km.

Stage 12 is a ceremonial special stage to celebrate reaching Lac Rose and, while timed, does not add any time to the general classification.

The bike category was won by a margin of only 41 seconds by rookie Kevin Gallas in only his third ever rally raid. Gerrit Zuurmond retained his title with a second consecutive win in the trucks.

This event welcomed two octogenarians. Noël Essers (82), a three-time podium finisher in the event, made a return in the trucks after a six year hiatus and Yoshimasa Sugawara (84) returned in a race category after being in the raid category the previous year.

== Entry list ==
172 total vehicles lined up at the start of the race event which include 105 motorcycles (1 quad), 20 cars, 20 SSV/T3/T4, 5 trucks, and 22 vehicles in the historic category (21 cars and 1 truck).

124 vehicles finished the event, including 70 motorcycles, 13 cars, 16 SSV/T3/T4, 4 trucks, and 21 historic vehicles.

There were also 13 bikes and 13 cars in the non-racing raid category.

=== Vehicles and Categories ===
The vehicle categories were adjusted and reduced compared to the 2025 event. The historic class remained the same.

Vehicles and Categories

Bikes				Cars		
Category	Class	Identifier	Description	Category	Class	Description
1		450 cc	Up to 450 cc	T1	T1.+	Prototype Cross-Country Cars Thermic
2		>450 cc	Over 450 cc	T1	T1.1	Prototype Cross-Country Cars "Ultimate"
3			Multicylinder: >300 cc to 649 cc	T1	T1.2	4x4 Prototype Cross-Country Cars
4			Multicylinder: 650 to 999 cc	T2	T2	Series Production Cross-Country Cars
5			Multicylinder: >1000 cc	T3	T3.U	Lightweight Prototype Cross-Country Vehicles
6			Experimental	T3	T3.1	Lightweight Prototype Cross-Country Vehicles
7	G		Competition Quad: Powered by the action of two wheels (2-wheel drive)	T4	T4	Modified Production Cross-Country Side-by-Side Vehicles
7	H		Competition Quad: Powered by the action of four wheels (4-wheel drive)	SSV Series	SSV.1	Atmospheric engine: <999 cc
	1		Female	SSV Series	SSV.2	Atmospheric engine: >999 cc
	2		Junior (under 25 years)	SSV Series	SSV.3	Turbo engine
	3		Veteran (over 45 years)	T5	T5.1	Trucks 10L or over
	4		Malle Moto (Motul Xtreme Rider)	T5	T5.2	Trucks under 10L
	5		Rookie Rider (by Milwaukee) (Note: Requirements to be eligible for the Milwaukee Rookie Rider class: • To be aged less than 35 years old on the day of the start of the rally (24/01/2026) • To have never taken part in a rally longer than 8 days.)	Open	Open.U	
	6		Experimental	Open	Open	

=== Competitor List ===
Entry list — Bikes

Note
– "Milwaukee Rookie Rider": Aged less than 35 years old on the day of the start of the rally, and have never taken part in a rally longer than 8 days.
– "Original by Motul" — Competitors participating in the "Motul Xtreme Rider" Malle Moto, a marathon class with limited assistance.
– Competitors that were not able to start the race.

No.	Driver	Bike	Team	Category	Class
1	(Italy) Jacopo Cerutti	Aprilia Tuareg 660	Aprilia Tuareg Racing	(4) 650-999 Multicylinder	
2	(Italy) Alessandro Botturi	Yamaha Ténéré 700	Ténéré Yamaha Racing Rally Team	(4) 650-999 Multicylinder	3^{V}
6	(Italy) Marco Menichini	Aprilia Tuareg 660	Aprilia Tuareg Racing	(4) 650-999 Multicylinder	
7	(France) Bruno Da Costa	Honda Translap 750	Honda Xperience	(4) 650-999 Multicylinder	3^{V}
11	(France) Samuel Chamoin	Yamaha Ténéré 700	Dubois Moto Thome	(4) 650-999 Multicylinder	
12	(France) David Fretigne	Honda CRF 450 Rally	Honda Off Road Center	(1) 450	3^{V}
13	(Portugal) Alexandre Azinhais	KTM 500 EXC-F	Club Aventura Touareg Motoglobo	(2) 450+	3^{V}
14	(Austria) Daniel Di Giusto	KTM 450 Rally	Wiedemann Motorsports	(1) 450	3^{V}
15	(France) Christian Punginelli	Husqvarna 450	Rc Motorsport	(1) 450	3^{V}
16	(France) Jean Louis Gros	Kove 450 Rally	Chatjlg Defi Dunes	(1) 450	3^{V}
17	(Italy) Matteo Bottino	Kove 800x Rally Ls	Kove Italia Racing Team	(4) 650-999 Multicylinder	
18	(Belgium) Frédéric Richter	Kove 450 Rally	Fred Moto Adventures	(1) 450	3^{V}
19	(Austria) Luca Seppele	Kove 450 Ex	Kove Italia Racing Team	(2) 450+	
20	(Italy) Mirco Bettini	Beta 480 RR	Azzurrorosa	(2) 450+	3^{V}
21	(France) Gautier Paulin	Yamaha Ténéré 700	Ténéré Yamaha Racing Rally Team	(4) 650-999 Multicylinder	
22	(Switzerland) Didier Martin	Husqvarna 701	Le P'tit Team	(2) 450+	3^{V}
23	(Italy) Tommaso Bettini	Beta 480 RR	Azzurrorosa	(2) 450+	2^{J}
24	(France) Frédéric Miñana	Red Moto CRF 450 Rally	Honda Xperience	(1) 450	3^{V}
25	(Germany) Jan Nikolaus Christian Winkler	Honda CRF 450 Rally	Oakleaf Engineering	(1) 450	
26	(France) Stephane Stragliati	KTM 450 Rally	Srt	(1) 450	3^{V}
28	(Belgium) Boris Wolters	Husquvarna 450 Rally	City2roues Racing	(1) 450	
29	(Belgium) Nicolas Michaux	Yamaha Ténéré 700	Michaux	(4) 650-999 Multicylinder	
30	(Argentina) Thomas Marini	Husqvarna 450 Rally	Solarys Factory	(1) 450	
31	(Netherlands) Gerben Lieverdink	KTM 450 Rally	Memo Tours Team	(1) 450	3^{V}
32	(France) Joanny Dussurgey	GasGas RX 450 F	Dream Big	(1) 450	
33	(South Africa) Martin Camp	Kove 450 EX	Amsoil - Martin Camp	(1) 450	3^{V}
34	(France) James Simonin	Husqvarna 450 Rally	Adventure World	(1) 450	3^{V}
35	(South Africa) Mark Johnston	Honda CRF 450 Rally	Johnston Moto	(1) 450	3^{V}
36	(Morocco) Achraf Zoulati	KTM 450 EXC-F	Fed. Royale Marocaine De Motocyclisme	(1) 450	
38	(Italy) Paolo Caprioni	Husqvarna 450 FR	Team Solarys Factory	(1) 450	3^{V}
39	(France) Ludovic Pennant	GasGas RX 450 F	Team Rev2roues	(1) 450	
40	(Italy) Stefano Dogliotti	Kove 450 Rally	Kove Italia	(1) 450	
41	(Switzerland) Mike Bächler	KTM 450 Rally	S3 Rally	(1) 450	
42	(Norway) Thomas Fathke	Husqvarna 450 FR	Wiedemann Motorsports	(1) 450	
43	(Italy) Luca Perna	Kove 450 Rally	Team Solarys Factory	(1) 450	3^{V}
44	(Portugal) Gad Nachmani	KTM 450 Rally	Club Aventura Touareg	(1) 450	3^{V}
45	(France) Sébastien Petitpas	Honda CRF 450 Rally	Honda Xperience	(1) 450	3^{V}
50	(Norway) Hans Kristian Dovland	KTM 450 RFR	Dovland	(1) 450	
51	(France) Franck Garriga	Husqvarna 450 FE	Francky Goes to Dakar	(1) 450	3^{V}
52	(France) Cyril Buesa	Honda Transalp 750	Honda Xperience	(4) 650-999 Multicylinder	
53	(Switzerland) Sylvain Martignoni	KTM 450 Rally	S3 Rally	(1) 450	
55	(Slovakia) Patrik Siska	KTM 450 EXC-F	Wolverine Racing Team	(1) 450	
56	(France) Jean-christophe Menard	Honda Transalp 750	Honda Xperience	(4) 650-999 Multicylinder	3^{V}
59	(France) Marc Joineau	Kove 450 Rally	Team Dak'car	(1) 450	
60	(France) Alex Yon	KTM 450 RFR	Enduro Normandie	(1) 450	
61	(France) Jim Moisa	KTM 450 RFR	Enduro Normandie	(1) 450	
62	(Italy) Giuseppe Pozzo	KTM 500 EXC	Gpc Team Pozzo	(2) 450+	
64	(France) Dominique Robin	Honda CRF 450 Rally	Honda Xperience	(1) 450	3^{V}
66	(Netherlands) Hille Dalstra	Honda 450 Rally	Fryslan	(1) 450	
67	(France) Philippe Heraud	KTM 450 EXC	Philippe Heraud	(1) 450	3^{V}
68	(France) David Barrot	Honda Transalp 750	Honda Xperience	(4) 650-999 Multicylinder	3^{V}
69	(France) Alexis Raoux	Yamaha Ténéré 700	Ténéré Yamaha Racing Rally Team	(4) 650-999 Multicylinder	
70	(France) Isabelle Gazon	Yamaha Ténéré 700	Ténéré Yamaha Racing Rally Team	(4) 650-999 Multicylinder	1^{F} 3^{V}
71	(France) Yann Duprey	Yamaha Ténéré 700	Ténéré Yamaha Racing Rally Team	(4) 650-999 Multicylinder	3^{V}
72	(Italy) Carmelo Palmer	Honda 450 Rally	Calabria Adventure	(1) 450	3^{V}
73	(Italy) Massimo FErrari	Husquarna 450 Rally	Rs Moto	(1) 450	3^{V}
74	(France) Mathieu Croisier	KTM 890 Adventure r	Les Champs D'aire	(4) 650-999 Multicylinder	
75	(Germany) Kai Fröhlich	KTM 450 Rally	Memo Tours Team	(1) 450	3^{V}
76	(France) Hugh De Belloy	Husqvarna 450 Rally	Qdr	(1) 450	
77	(Spain) Ricardo Iglesias Cartón	KTM 450 EXC	Pedrega	(1) 450	
80	(Czech Republic) Roman Krejci	KTM 450 Rally	Boibeton Racing	(1) 450	3^{V}
86	(Spain) Carlos De Juan	KTM 450 Rally	Dubon Racing-bonatel	(1) 450	3^{V}
87	(Norway) Magnus Holsen Aasberg	KTM 450 RFR	A4+	(1) 450	
88	(France) Cédric Jacques	Husqvarna 450 Rally	Razorback Team	(1) 450	3^{V}
89	(France) Thierry Traccan	Honda CRF 450 Rally	Honda Off Road Center	(1) 450	3^{V}
90	(Norway) Joachim Hellsten	KTM 450 RFR	A4+	(1) 450	
91	(France) Benoit Dalle Palle	KTM 450 EXC	Razorback Team	(1) 450	
92	(Netherlands) Stephan Savelkouls	Husqvarna 450 RR	Memo Tours Team	(1) 450	
93	(France) Laurent Cochet	Yamaha Ténéré 700	Ténéré Yamaha Racing Rally Team	(4) 650-999 Multicylinder	3^{V}
94	(France) Valentin Sertilhanges	KTM 450 Rally	Horizon Moto 95	(1) 450	
95	(France) Amaury Baratin	KTM 450 Rally	Horizon Moto 95	(1) 450	3^{V}
96	(Netherlands) Lejon Fokkema	Husqvarna 450 RR	Memo Tours Team	(1) 450	
97	(Senegal) Alexis Varagne	Yamaha Raptor 700R	Team Senegal	(7G) Quad	
98	(Netherlands) Robert Sr. Van Pelt	Fantic Motor	Memo Tours Team	(1) 450	3^{V}
99	(Netherlands) Robert Jr. Van Pelt	Husqvarna 450 RR	Memo Tours Team	(1) 450	
100	(France) Cyril Forget	Arctic Leopard Exe 880	Cfr Endurance	(6) Electic	3^{V}
106	(France) Bertrand Gavard	Yamaha Ténéré 700	Ténéré Yamaha Racing Rally Team	(4) 650-999 Multicylinder	3^{V}
109	(Portugal) Antonio Maio	Yamaha Ténéré 700	Ténéré Yamaha Racing Rally Team	(4) 650-999 Multicylinder	
110	(Italy) Francesco Montanari	Aprilia Tuareg 660	Aprilia Tuareg Racing	(4) 650-999 Multicylinder	
111	(Canada) Timur Urakov	Yamaha Ténéré 700	Ténéré Yamaha Racing Rally Team	(4) 650-999 Multicylinder	
112	(Sweden) Stephan Wilhelmsson	KTM 450 Rally	All in Travel	(1) 450	
114	(France) Thomas Barea Fernandez	KTM 450 EXC-F	Rtc	(1) 450	3^{V}
115	(Switzerland) Remi Sailland	KTM 450 Rally	Dunes and Dude	(1) 450	
120	(Sweden) Anders Berglund	KTM 450 RFR	Anders Berglund	(1) 450	3^{V}
121	(Italy) Sebastiano Antonello	Kove 450 Rally	Sebastiano Antonello	(1) 450	
122	(Italy) Andrea Vignone	GasGas Es 700	Motosystem #becrazy Reparto Corse	(2) 450+	
123	(Italy) Fabio Lottero	KTM 500 EXC-F	Club Aventura Touareg	(2) 450+	
124	(Belgium) Nicolas Charlier	Yamaha Ténéré 700	Ténéré Yamaha Racing Rally Team	(4) 650-999 Multicylinder	
125	(France) Jean Codaccioni	KTM 500 EXC-F	Capo Racing Club	(2) 450+	
126	(Netherlands) Maarten Buitenhuis	Velimotor Havocker Electric	Team Powersportcenter.nl	(6) Electic	3^{V}
127	(France) Willy Jobard	Jinyuxing H40 Electric Rally	Team Powersportcenter.nl	(6) Electic	
128	(France) Max Bianucci	Husqvarna 450 Rally	Bianucci	(1) 450	
143	(France) Kévin Durand	Honda CRF 450 Rally	Dream 2 Raid	(1) 450	
144	(Germany) Michael Riebel	KTM 450 Rally	Siamar Reisen Wiedemann Motorsports	(1) 450	3^{V}
150	(South Africa) Matthew Gird	Husqvarna 450 FR	Northeast Racing	(1) 450	
151	(Australia) Mark Frater	KTM 450 RFR	Go Glass	(1) 450	3^{V}
155	(France) Benjamin Cerovic	Honda CRF 450 Rally	Benj Off Road	(1) 450	
168	(France) Jean-christophe Mangeart	Honda Red Moto CRF 450 RX Rally	Genay Racing	(1) 450	3^{V}
169	(France) Christophe Arrive	Yamaha Ténéré 700	Ténéré Yamaha Racing Rally Team	(4) 650-999 Multicylinder	3^{V}
171	(Germany) Kevin Gallas	Yamaha Ténéré 700	Ténéré Yamaha Racing Rally Team	(4) 650-999 Multicylinder	
174	(Switzerland) Gilles Kuffer	Yamaha Ténéré 700	Ténéré Yamaha Racing Rally Team	(4) 650-999 Multicylinder	
176	(France) Jean-loup Lepan	KTM 450 Rally	Rc Assistance	(1) 450	
183	(France) Anthony Neves	KTM 690 Enduro R	Girondin	(2) 450+	
184	(France) Noa Sainct	KTM 450 EXC-F	Sainct	(1) 450	2^{J}
191	(Germany) Mike Wiedemann	Yamaha Ténéré 700	Wiedemann Motorsports	(4) 650-999 Multicylinder	

Entry list — SSVs, Cars, Trucks

No.	Driver	Co-Driver	Technician	Vehicle	Team	Category
200	(Belgium) Vincent Vroninks	(Belgium) Dave Berghmans	No Technician	Red Lined VK56	Desert Lions Rally Team	T1.1
201	(France) David Gerard	(France) Pascal Delacour	No Technician	MD Optimus Rallye	Nominoe Aventures / Les Fous Du Volant/md Rallye	T1.2
202	(Hungary) Varga Imre	(Hungary) József Toma	No Technician	Toyota Hilux	Varga Racing Team	T1.1
205	(Belgium) Pol Van Pollaert	(France) Anthony Pes	No Technician	MD Optimus Rallye	Desert Foxx Racing	T1.2
206	(Poland) Magdalena Zajac	(Poland) Błażej Czekan	No Technician	Toyota Hilux	Proxcars Tme Rally Team	T1.1
207	(Czech Republic) Tomas Ourednicek	(Czech Republic) Lukas Bartak	No Technician	Toyota Hilux	Musicdata Toyota Gazoo Racing Czech	T1+
208	(France) Eric Coquide	(France) Christophe Benjamin	No Technician	Nissan Atacama	Rt2r	Open A
210	(Belgium) Cedric Feryn	(Belgium) Bjorn Burgelman	No Technician	Toyota Landcruiser 200	Feryn Rally Raid Team	Open A
215	(Belgium) Christian Femont	(Belgium) Gregg Docx	No Technician	Mini Cooper X-raid	Desert Foxx Racing	T1+
218	(Belgium) Nicolas Delencre	(Belgium) Jonathan Lurquin	No Technician	MD Optimus Rallye	Config Racing Team	T1.2
222	(Belgium) Pascal Feryn	(Belgium) Kurt Keysers	No Technician	Toyota Hilux	Feryn Rally Raid Team	T1.1
225	(Turkey) Kacem Hamsas	(France) Paul Durame	No Technician	Smg Buggy	Hamsas Team	T1.2
230	(France) Guy Housset	(France) Loic Minaudier	No Technician	MD Optimus Rallye	Hl Racing	T1.2
232	(Belgium) Philippe Lambilliotte	(Belgium) François Beguin	No Technician	MD Optimus Rallye	Config Racing Team	T1.2
233	(Belgium) Koen Wauters	(Belgium) Tom De Leeuw	No Technician	Toyota Hilux	Feryn Rally Raid Team	T1.1
235	(Slovenia) Roman Starikovich	(Netherlands) Bert Heskes	No Technician	Toyota Hilux	Autolife Team	T1.1
236	(Italy) Andrea Schiumarini	(Italy) Maurizio Gerini	No Technician	Century CR6	R Team	T1.2
243	(Japan) Hide Hirohashi	(Japan) Mami Masuda	No Technician	Suzuki Jimny	Equipe Sugawara	Open A
244	(Japan) Yoshimasa Sugawara	(Japan) Naoko Matsumoto	No Technician	Suzuki Jimny	Equipe Sugawara	Open A
250	(Italy) Enrico Gaspari	(Italy) Paolo Ceci	No Technician	Can-Am Maverick X3	HRT Technology Sabelt	T4.1
251	(France) Pierre Lafay	(France) Stephane Denecheau	No Technician	Can-Am Maverick R	Team Gazzafond	SSV3
252	(Romania) Nicusor Duica	(Romania) Nicoleta Duica	No Technician	Can-Am Maverick	N&N Racing	SSV3
253	(France) Jerome Cambier	(France) Marion Andrieu	No Technician	MMP FJ	Jerome Cambier	SSV3
254	(Romania) Andreev Marian	(Romania) Constantin Fantana	No Technician	Can-Am Maverick R	MC Racing Romania	SSV3
255	(Morocco) Souad Mouktadiri	(France) Anthony Imbert	No Technician	Can-Am Maverick X3 XRS	MS Racing	T4.1
256	(Belgium) Hans Den Ouden	(Belgium) Dirk Goris	No Technician	Can-Am Maverick X3	Art of Speed - Echt Hé	T4.1
258	(United Kingdom) Ferenc Fodor	(Romania) Calin Camarasan	No Technician	Can-Am Maverick X3	Ace of Spades	T4.1
260	(France) Jean-françois Le Corre	(Norway) Anette Fjeld	No Technician	Can-Am Maverick R	Koberi Beer Racing	SSV3
265	(France) Christophe Tesson	(France) Marc Jourdan	No Technician	Yamaha YXZ 1000R	Team Sixty Five 2026	SSV3
266	(France) Olivier Goullioud	(France) Thomas Gaidella	No Technician	Polaris RZR Pro R	Zitoun Racing	T4.1
270	(Netherlands) Marcel Van Berlo	(Netherlands) Olaf Harmsen	No Technician	Can-Am Maverick 1000R	QFF Racing	T4.1
271	(Netherlands) Sander Derikx	(Netherlands) Rob Buursen	No Technician	Can-Am Maverick 1000R	QFF Racing	T4.1
272	(Netherlands) Bob Herber	(Netherlands) Gijs Bessem	No Technician	Can-Am Maverick 1000R	QFF Racing	T4.1
273	(France) William Grarre	(France) Vincent Ferri	No Technician	Can-Am Maverick X3	TRC	T4.1
275	(Netherlands) Martijn Van Den Broek	(Netherlands) Mike Daas	No Technician	Can-Am Maverick 1000R	QFF Racing	T4.1
277	(France) Nicolas Davin	(France) Jean Sembel	No Technician	Can-Am Maverick R XRS	Vulcan	SSV3
279	(France) Philippe Champigné	(France) Bruno Robin	No Technician	Can-Am Maverick XRS	Team Aventure 79	T4.1
285	(France) Eric Bernard	(France) Damien Derocq	No Technician	Can-Am Maverick R	Vendée Team	SSV3
299	(Slovakia) Martin Benko	(Slovakia) Marek Sykora	No Technician	MCE5 T3M Taurus T3	Norwit Racing	T3.1
400	(Netherlands) Gerrit Zuurmond	(Netherlands) Tjeerd Van Ballegooij	(Netherlands) Klaas Kwakkel	MAN TGA	Rainbow Truck Team	T5
405	(Netherlands) Mike Panhuijzen	(Netherlands) Pieter Kuypers	(Netherlands) Eric Jan Hartjes	MAN TGA	Greenteam Panhuijzen	T5
407	(France) Franck Coquide	(France) Daniel Penkala	(France) Jean-Francois Delaval	Renault K520	RT2R	T5
410	(Netherlands) Martin Roeterdink	(Netherlands) Roy Korenromp	(Netherlands) Geralt Van T Blik	DAF CF	Truck Team Muller	T5
482	(Belgium) Noel Essers	(Belgium) Frits Driesmans	(Belgium) Davy Vanden Boer	MAN TGA	Art Of Speed - Essers	T5

Entry list — Historic

No.	Driver	Navigator	Technician	Vehicle	Team	Category	Class
300	(Germany) Dr. Erik Brandenburg	(Germany) Marnie Brandenburg	No Technician	Porsche 911 SC	911 Racing Team Hamburg	1	
301	(Germany) Peter Lehmann	(Germany) Tom Brandenburg	No Technician	Porsche 911	911 Racing Team Hamburg	1	
302	(Argentina) Jorge Perez Companc	(Argentina) Ezequiel Perez Companc	No Technician	Toyota HDJ 80	Madpanda Motorsport	2	
304	(United Kingdom) Tom Lloyd Owen	(United Kingdom) Matt Skeggs	No Technician	Range Rover Classic V8	Guincho Racing	2	
305	(France) Philippe Jacquot	(France) Benoît Juif	No Technician	Porsche 911	Team 205 Africaraid	2	
307	(France) Sébastien Desprets	(France) Jacques Devisme	(France) Herve Darras	Renault Truck Kerax	RT2R	Truck	
308	(Switzerland) Jean Marc Fert	(France) Éric Houdard	No Technician	Porsche 911	Interceptor - Modulauto	1	
311	(Norway) Lars Rolner	(Germany) Patrick Simon	No Technician	Porsche 911 Safari	Flying P	1	
312	(France) Jonathan Metge	(France) Élodie Metge	No Technician	Range Rover	Metge Adventure	1	
315	(France) Jean-françois Rocher	(France) Philippe Laviron	No Technician	Toyota HDJ 80	A.ri.v.	2	
317	(France) Jean-michel Villot	(France) Marie Tourneur	No Technician	Mitsubishi Pajero Ralliart V6	Raillart Off Road Classic	2	
322	(Belgium) Dirk Van Rompuy	(Spain) Jan Rosa	No Technician	Toyota HDJ 80	TH-Trucks Team	2	
326	(France) Axel Berrier	(France) Jérémy Athimon	No Technician	Porsche 964 Dkr	Classic Only Racing Npa Racing	2	
330	(Spain) Alberto Herrero	(Spain) Daniel Rebollares	No Technician	Toyota HDJ 80	TH-Trucks Team	2	
333	(Germany) Jens-peter Siegel	(Germany) Jonas Gebhard Allert	No Technician	Land Rover Defender 90	Bad.j.p. 3	1	
344	(France) Serge Mogno	(France) Olivier Moliere	No Technician	Toyota HDJ 80	Canari Rallye Raid	2	
351	(France) Gilles Girousse	(France) Jérémy Roiseux	No Technician	Toyota HDJ 80	Xtrem Aventure Girousse	2	
352	(France) Philippe Voisin	(France) François Costes	No Technician	Toyota HDJ 100	Xtrem Aventure Girousse	3	
354	(Belgium) Bart Vanhaverbeke	(Belgium) Bart Descheemaeker	No Technician	Mercedes 500 SLC	H Plus Rally Team	1	
355	(France) Pierre Bourdeau	(France) Bruno Domy	No Technician	Toyoya HJ 61	Bourdeau	2	
384	(France) François-Xavier Bourgois	(France) Patrice Auzet	No Technician	Range Rover	Acit Racing	1	
385	(France) Édouard Dhondt	(France) Laurent Bourgois	No Technician	Peugeot 504	Eurovanille / Barry	1	
399	(Norway) Christian Rolner	(Germany) Jan Glüsing	No Technician	Porsche Cayenne S	Flying P	3	

Entry list — Raid Bikes & Cars

No.	Crew			Vehicle	Team
500	(France) Xavier Padovani			KTM 690 Enduro R	Flyingpado
501	(France) Bruno-felix Derossi			KTM 450 Rally	Team Dak'car
506	(France) Stéphane Peterhansel			Yamaha Ténéré 700	Ténéré Yamaha Racing Rally
507	(France) Constance Lanher			Kove 800 Rallye	Moto D'homme
508	(France) Marc Vigneron			Honda Transalp	Honda Xperience
509	(Italy) Alberto Morosi			Honda CRF450 Rally	Alberto Morosi
510	(Switzerland) Peter Eggimann			Yamaha XT600Z	Eggimates
515	(France) Stéphane Gourlia			KTM 890 Adventure	Gourlia
518	(France) Stéphane Bouvier			KTM 890 Adventure R	Team Pompey 21
525	(France) Morgan Bernoux			Yamaha Ténéré 700	Ténéré Yamaha Racing Rally Team
527	(Spain) Karim Hachem Hernandez			Kove 450 Rally	Rodis
528	(France) Mahmoud Hawili			Kove 450 Rally	Rodis
539	(France) Michaël Gaume			Fantic XEF 450 Rally	Mika
542	(France) Gilles Bretton			Husqvarna 450	Bretton
550	(France) Amaury Le Roux	(France) Caroline Le Roux		Ford Ranger	Mps Racing Team
551	(France) Fabrice Garello	(France) Sophie Garello		Toyota Hilux	Mps Racing Team
552	(France) Hélène Gomez	(France) Didier Gomez		Isuzu D-Max	Mps Racing Team
553	(France) Noël Viel	(France) Maryvonne Viel		Mitsubishi L200	Team Go Ouest
555	(Italy) Chieregato Anna	(Italy) Claudio Pastorello		Land Rover Defender 110	San Benedetto
562	(France) Franck Allard	(France) Claude Valion		Toyota HDJ 100	Amv
566	(France) Bernard Jacques	(France) Thierry Jacques		Toyota FJ Cruiser	Razorback Team
567	(Netherlands) Carlo Arendt	(Netherlands) Corry Arendt		Toyota HDJ 80	Let's Make it Happen
570	(Belgium) Tom De Neef	(Belgium) Steven Van Egdom		Ineos Grenadier	Tdn@brakepoint
577	(Belgium) Pierre-yves Magerotte	(France) Matis Marchal		Toyota Hilux	Fun2africa
588	(France) Emmanuel Grelaud	(Russia) Elena Shcheglova		Toyota Hilux	Team Grelaud
595	(Latvia) Gatis Podvigs	(Latvia) Martins Bilzens	(Latvia) Agnis Engelis	Land Rover Defender 110	Location Independent
599	(Latvia) Rihards Bilzens	(Latvia) Maris Palma		Toyota Land Cruiser 200	Location Independent Cok / Behemoth

== Stages ==
Stage	Date	Start	Finish	Special (km)	Total (km)
Boat Boarding	20 January	(France) Marseille	-	-	-
Boat Disembark	22 January	-	(Morocco) Tangier	-	-
Technical Check	24 January	(Morocco) Tangier	-	-	-
~~Prologue~~ (Note: Cancelled due to weather.)	~~25 January~~	~~(Morocco) Tangier~~	~~(Morocco) Tangier~~	~~0~~	~~0~~
~~1~~ (Note: Cancelled due to weather.)	~~26 January~~	~~(Morocco) Tangier~~	~~(Morocco) Bousaid~~	~~88.23~~	~~783.43~~
2	27 January	(Morocco) Bousaid	(Morocco) Tagounite	380.42	424.99
3	28 January	(Morocco) Tagounite	(Morocco) Assa	439.94	514.16
4	29 January	(Morocco) Assa	(Morocco) Khnifiss	482.64	487.75
5	30 January	(Morocco) Khnifiss	(Morocco) Dakhla	395.38	768.18
Rest	5 January	Rest day in (Morocco) Dakhla			
6	1 February	(Morocco) Dakhla	(Mauritania) Chami	152.12	590.22
7	2 February	(Mauritania) Chami	(Mauritania) Aidzidine	461.68	462.08
8	3 February	(Mauritania) Aidzidine	(Mauritania) Aidzidine	414.16	428.2
~~9~~	4 February	(Mauritania) Aidzidine	(Mauritania) Ouad Naga	425.72	490.69
10	5 February	(Mauritania) Ouad Naga	(Mauritania) Ouad Naga	444.28	470.01
11	6 February	(Mauritania) Ouad Naga	(Senegal) Mpal	130.82	475.51
12	7 February	(Senegal) Mpal	(Senegal) Dakar	21.48	272.43
Totals				3836.87	6167.65

== Stage winners ==
Stage	Bikes	SSV (T4)	Cars	Trucks	Historics
Stage 1	Stage Cancelled				
Stage 2	(Italy) Alessandro Botturi	(France) Pierre Lafay	(Belgium) Nicolas Delencre	(Netherlands) Gerrit Zuurmond	(Argentina) Jorge Perez Companc
Stage 3	(San Marino) Thomas Marini	(France) Pierre Lafay	(Belgium) Pol Van Pollaert	(Netherlands) Gerrit Zuurmond	(Belgium) Drik Van Rompuy
Stage 4	(Italy) Jacopo Cerutti	(Netherlands) Sander Derikx	(Belgium) Nicolas Delencre	(Netherlands) Gerrit Zuurmond	(Argentina) Jorge Perez Companc
Stage 5	(Germany) Kevin Gallas	(France) Pierre Lafay	(France) Guy Housset	(Netherlands) Gerrit Zuurmond	(Germany) Dr. Erik Brandenburg
Stage 6	(France) Paulin Gautier	(France) Pierre Lafay	(Belgium) Christian Femont	(Netherlands) Gerrit Zuurmond	(Germany) Dr. Erik Brandenburg
Stage 7	(Germany) Kevin Gallas	(France) Pierre Lafay	(Belgium) Pol Van Pollaert	(Netherlands) Gerrit Zuurmond	
Stage 8	(France) Paulin Gautier	(Slovakia) Martin Benko	(Belgium) Christian Femont	(France) Franck Coquide	
Stage 9	(France) Jean-Loup Lepan	(Netherlands) Martijn Van Den Broek	(Belgium) Christian Femont	(Netherlands) Gerrit Zuurmond	
Stage 10	(France) Paulin Gautier	(Netherlands) Martijn Van Den Broek	(Italy) Andrea Schiumarini	(Netherlands) Mike Panhuijzen	
Stage 11	(France) Jean-Loup Lepan	(Italy) Enrico Gaspari	(Poland) Magdalena Zajac	(Netherlands) Gerrit Zuurmond	
Stage 12	(France) David Frétigné	(Netherlands) Martijn Van Den Broek	(Italy) Andrea Schiumarini	(Netherlands) Gerrit Zuurmond	
Rally Winners	(Germany) Kevin Gallas	(Netherlands) Martijn Van Den Broek	(France) David Gerard	(Netherlands) Gerrit Zuurmond	(Argentina) Jorge Perez Companc

== Stage results ==
=== Bike ===
	Stage result						General classification					
Stage	Pos	Competitor	Make	Class	Time	Gap	Pos	Competitor	Make	Class	Time	Gap
1	Stage cancelled											
2	1	(Italy) Alessandro Botturi	Yamaha	650+ Multicylinder	02:24:04		1	(Italy) Alessandro Botturi	Yamaha	650+ Multicylinder	02:24:04	
2	2	(France) Jean-Loup Lepan	KTM	450	02:26:14	00:02:10	2	(France) Jean-Loup Lepan	KTM	450	02:26:14	00:02:10
2	3	(Germany) Kevin Gallas	Yamaha	650+ Multicylinder	02:26:21	00:02:17	3	(Germany) Kevin Gallas	Yamaha	650+ Multicylinder	02:26:21	00:02:17
3	1	(San Marino) Thomas Marini	Husqvarna	450	04:53:26		1	(San Marino) Thomas Marini	Husqvarna	450	07:22:36	
3	2	(Germany) Kevin Gallas	Yamaha	650+ Multicylinder	05:01:19	00:07:53	2	(Germany) Kevin Gallas	Yamaha	650+ Multicylinder	07:27:40	00:05:04
3	3	(France) Jean-Loup Lepan	KTM	450	05:02:20	00:08:54	3	(France) Jean-Loup Lepan	KTM	450	07:27:40	00:05:58
4	1	(Italy) Jacopo Cerutti	Aprilia	650+ Multicylinder	05:14:32		1	(Italy) Jacopo Cerutti	Aprilia	650+ Multicylinder	12:45:46	
4	2	(France) Gautier Paulin	Yamaha	650+ Multicylinder	05:18:43	00:04:11	2	(San Marino) Thomas Marini	Husqvarna	450	12:50:35	00:04:49
4	3	(Portugal) Antonio Maio	Yamaha	650+ Multicylinder	05:20:26	00:05:54	3	(France) Jean-Loup Lepan	KTM	450	12:50:36	00:05:50
5	1	(Germany) Kevin Gallas	Yamaha	650+ Multicylinder	03:19:46		1	(France) Jean-Loup Lepan	KTM	450	16:11:51	
5	2	(France) Jean-Loup Lepan	KTM	450	03:21:15	00:01:29	2	(Germany) Kevin Gallas	Yamaha	650+ Multicylinder	16:12:16	00:00:15
5	3	(San Marino) Thomas Marini	Husqvarna	450	03:22:17	00:02:31	3	(San Marino) Thomas Marini	Husqvarna	450	16:12:52	00:01:01
6	1	(France) Paulin Gautier	Yamaha	650+ Multicylinder	01:11:23		1	(France) Jean-Loup Lepan	KTM	450	17:27:48	
6	2	(Italy) Alessandro Botturi	Yamaha	650+ Multicylinder	1:13:51	00:02:28	2	(San Marino) Thomas Marini	Husqvarna	450	17:29:36	00:01:48
6	3	(France) Baratin Amaury	KTM	450	1:15:45	00:04:22	3	(Italy) Jacopo Cerutti	Aprilia	650+ Multicylinder	17:30:34	00:02:46
7	1	(Germany) Kevin Gallas	Yamaha	650+ Multicylinder	05:53:58		1	(Germany) Kevin Gallas	Yamaha	650+ Multicylinder	23:25:11	
7	2	(Germany) Mike Wiedemann	Yamaha	650+ Multicylinder	05:54:16	00:00:18	2	(San Marino) Thomas Marini	Husqvarna	450	23:31:23	00:06:12
7	3	(San Marino) Thomas Marini	Husqvarna	450	06:01:47	00:07:49	3	(France) Jean-Loup Lepan	KTM	450	23:34:51	00:09:40
8	1	(France) Paulin Gautier	Yamaha	650+ Multicylinder	04:57:32		1	(San Marino) Thomas Marini	Husqvarna	450	28:34:30	
8	2	(France) Jean-Loup Lepan	KTM	450	05:00:06	00:02:34	2	(France) Jean-Loup Lepan	KTM	450	28:34:57	00:00:27
8	3	(Italy) Jacopo Cerutti	Aprilia	650+ Multicylinder	05:03:00	00:05:28	3	(Germany) Kevin Gallas	Yamaha	650+ Multicylinder	28:47:39	00:13:09
9	1	(France) Jean-Loup Lepan	KTM	450	04:16:23		1	(France) Jean-Loup Lepan	KTM	450	32:51:20	
9	2	(Germany) Kevin Gallas	Yamaha	650+ Multicylinder	04:22:30	00:06:07	2	(Germany) Kevin Gallas	Yamaha	650+ Multicylinder	33:10:09	00:18:49
9	3	(Portugal) Antonio Maio	Yamaha	650+ Multicylinder	04:28:43	00:12:20	3	(France) Paulin Gautier	Yamaha	650+ Multicylinder	33:23:29	00:32:09
10	1	(France) Paulin Gautier	Yamaha	650+ Multicylinder	04:41:42		1	(France) Paulin Gautier	Yamaha	650+ Multicylinder	38:05:11	
10	2	(Germany) Mike Wiedemann	Yamaha	650+ Multicylinder	04:50:06	00:08:24	2	(Germany) Kevin Gallas	Yamaha	650+ Multicylinder	38:06:36	00:01:25
10	3	(Italy) Alessandro Botturi	Yamaha	650+ Multicylinder	04:54:30	00:12:48	3	(France) Jean-Loup Lepan	KTM	450	38:27:20	00:22:09
11	1	(France) Jean-Loup Lepan	KTM	450	01:12:53		1	(Germany) Kevin Gallas	Yamaha	650+ Multicylinder	39:24:05	
11	2	(Italy) Jacopo Cerutti	Aprilia	650+ Multicylinder	01:14:22	00:01:29	2	(France) Paulin Gautier	Yamaha	650+ Multicylinder	39:24:46	00:00:41
11	3	(France) Noa Sainct	KTM	450	01:16:26	00:03:33	3	(France) Jean-Loup Lepan	KTM	450	39:40:13	00:16:08
12	1	(France) David Frétigné	Honda	450	00:12:20							
12	2	(France) Valentin Sertilhanges	KTM	450	00:12:20	00:00:00						
12	3	(Germany) Mike Wiedemann	Yamaha	650+ Multicylinder	00:13:06	00:00:46						

=== SSV ===
	Stage result						General classification					
Stage	Pos	Competitor	Make	Class	Time	Gap	Pos	Competitor	Make	Class	Time	Gap
1	Stage cancelled											
2	1	(France) Pierre Lafay	Can-Am	SSV3	02:24:34		1	(France) Pierre Lafay	Can-Am	SSV3	02:24:34	
2	2	(France) Jerome Cambier	MMP	T3.1	02:36:49	00:12:15	2	(France) Jerome Cambier	MMP	T3.1	02:36:49	00:12:15
2	3	(Netherlands) Sander Derikx	Can-Am	T4.1	02:37:30	00:12:56	3	(Netherlands) Sander Derikx	Can-Am	T4.1	02:37:30	00:12:56
3	1	(France) Pierre Lafay	Can-Am	SSV3	05:06:36		1	(France) Pierre Lafay	Can-Am	SSV3	07:31:10	
3	2	(Slovakia) Martin Benko	Taurus	T3.1	05:17:09	00:10:33	2	(Slovakia) Martin Benko	Taurus	T3.1	07:55:19	00:24:09
3	3	(France) William Grarre	Can-Am	T4.1	05:29:01	00:22:25	3	(France) William Grarre	Can-Am	T4.1	08:09:48	00:38:38
4	1	(Netherlands) Sander Derikx	Can-Am	T4.1	05:29:38		1	(Slovakia) Martin Benko	Taurus	T3.1	13:35:35	
4	2	(Slovakia) Martin Benko	Taurus	T3.1	05:40:16	00:10:38	2	(France) William Grarre	Can-Am	T4.1	14:02:21	00:26:46
4	3	(France) Eric Bernard	Can-Am	T4.1	05:46:38	00:17:00	3	(France) Jerome Cambier	MMP	T3.1	14:05:31	00:29:56
5	1	(France) Pierre Lafay	Can-Am	SSV3	03:27:45		1	(France) Pierre Lafay	Can-Am	SSV3	17:41:03	
5	2	(Netherlands) Sander Derikx	Can-Am	T4.1	03:37:33	00:09:48	2	(France) William Grarre	Can-Am	T4.1	17:43:35	00:02:32
5	3	(Netherlands) Bob Herber	Can-Am	T4.1	03:38:06	00:10:21	3	(France) Jerome Cambier	MMP	T3.1	17:50:37	00:09:34
6	1	(France) Pierre Lafay	Can-Am	SSV3	01:12:43		1	(France) Pierre Lafay	Can-Am	SSV3	18:53:46	
6	2	(Netherlands) Sander Derikx	Can-Am	T4.1	01:14:33	00:01:50	2	(France) William Grarre	Can-Am	T4.1	19:04:15	00:10:29
6	3	(Netherlands) Martijn Van Den Broek	Can-Am	T4.1	01:15:03	00:02:20	3	(France) Jerome Cambier	MMP	T3.1	19:07:29	00:13:43
7	1	(France) Pierre Lafay	Can-Am	SSV3	05:31:46		1	(France) Pierre Lafay	Can-Am	SSV3	24:25:32	
7	2	(Netherlands) Martijn Van Den Broek	Can-Am	T4.1	05:51:06	00:19:20	2	(France) William Grarre	Can-Am	T4.1	25:20:40	00:55:08
7	3	(Slovakia) Martin Benko	Taurus	T3.1	05:52:30	00:20:44	3	(Netherlands) Martijn Van Den Broek	Can-Am	T4.1	25:24:23	00:58:51
8	1	(Slovakia) Martin Benko	Taurus	T3.1	05:23:50		1	(Netherlands) Martijn Van Den Broek	Can-Am	T4.1	30:52:15	
8	2	(Netherlands) Sander Derikx	Can-Am	T4.1	05:25:53	00:02:03	2	(Netherlands) Sander Derikx	Can-Am	T4.1	31:27:09	00:34:54
8	3	(Netherlands) Martijn Van Den Broek	Can-Am	T4.1	05:27:52	00:04:02	3	(Slovakia) Martin Benko	Taurus	T3.1	31:30:59	00:38:44
9	1	(Netherlands) Martijn Van Den Broek	Can-Am	T4.1	04:36:08		1	(Netherlands) Martijn Van Den Broek	Can-Am	T4.1	35:28:23	
9	2	(Slovakia) Martin Benko	Taurus	T3.1	04:41:44	00:05:36	2	(Slovakia) Martin Benko	Taurus	T3.1	36:12:43	00:44:20
9	3	(France) Jerome Cambier	MMP	T3.1	04:46:12	00:10:04	3	(Netherlands) Sander Derikx	Can-Am	T4.1	36:32:58	01:04:35
10	1	(Netherlands) Martijn Van Den Broek	Can-Am	T4.1	05:03:18		1	(Netherlands) Martijn Van Den Broek	Can-Am	T4.1	40:31:41	
10	2	(France) Jerome Cambier	MMP	T3.1	05:05:54	00:02:36	2	(Slovakia) Martin Benko	Taurus	T3.1	41:23:56	00:52:15
10	3	(Slovakia) Martin Benko	Taurus	T3.1	05:11:13	00:07:55	3	(Netherlands) Sander Derikx	Can-Am	T4.1	42:07:19	01:35:38
11	1	(Italy) Enrico Gaspari	Can-Am	T4.1	01:14:38		1	(Netherlands) Martijn Van Den Broek	Can-Am	T4.1	41:56:38	
11	2	(Netherlands) Sander Derikx	Can-Am	T4.1	01:15:34	00:00:56	2	(Slovakia) Martin Benko	Taurus	T3.1	42:44:22	00:47:44
11	3	(Romania) Calin Camarasan	Can-Am	SSV3	01:16:23	00:01:45	3	(Netherlands) Sander Derikx	Can-Am	T4.1	43:22:53	01:26:15
12	1	(Netherlands) Martijn Van Den Broek	Can-Am	T4.1	00:14:43							
12	2	(Netherlands) Sander Derikx	Can-Am	T4.1	00:15:05	00:00:22						
12	3	(France) Eric Bernard	Can-Am	T4.1	00:15:37	00:00:54						

=== Car ===
	Stage result						General classification					
Stage	Pos	Competitor	Make	Class	Time	Gap	Pos	Competitor	Make	Class	Time	Gap
1	Stage cancelled											
2	1	(Belgium) Nicolas Delencre	MD Optimus	T1.2	02:20:19		1	(Belgium) Nicolas Delencre	MD Optimus	T1.2	02:20:19	
2	2	(Belgium) Philippe Lambilliotte	MD Optimus	T1.2	02:24:11	00:03:52	2	(Belgium) Philippe Lambilliotte	MD Optimus	T1.2	02:24:11	00:03:52
2	3	(Czech Republic) Tomas Ourednicek	Toyota	T1+	02:25:43	00:05:24	3	(Czech Republic) Tomas Ourednicek	Toyota	T1+	02:25:43	00:05:24
3	1	(Belgium) Pol Van Pollaert	MD Optimus	T1.2	05:05:27		1	(Belgium) Pol Van Pollaert	MD Optimus	T1.2	07:32:08	
3	2	(Belgium) Philippe Lambilliotte	MD Optimus	T1.2	05:09:17	00:03:50	2	(Belgium) Philippe Lambilliotte	MD Optimus	T1.2	07:33:28	00:01:20
3	3	(Italy) Andrea Schiumarini	Century	T1.2	05:14:02	00:08:35	3	(Belgium) Christian Femont	Mini	T1+	07:52:16	00:20:18
4	1	(Belgium) Nicolas Delencre	MD Optimus	T1.2	04:45:30		1	(Belgium) Pol Van Pollaert	MD Optimus	T1.2	12:29:02	
4	2	(Belgium) Pol Van Pollaert	MD Optimus	T1.2	04:56:54	00:11:24	2	(Belgium) Christian Femont	Mini	T1+	12:50:38	00:21:36
4	3	(Belgium) Christian Femont	Mini	T1+	04:58:22	00:12:52	3	(Belgium) Philippe Lambilliotte	MD Optimus	T1.2	13:06:23	00:37:21
5	1	(France) Guy Housset	MD Optimus	T1.2	03:07:04		1	(Belgium) Pol Van Pollaert	MD Optimus	T1.2	15:38:25	
5	2	(Belgium) Philippe Lambilliotte	MD Optimus	T1.2	03:07:27	00:00:23	2	(Belgium) Christian Femont	Mini	T1+	16:04:13	00:25:48
5	3	(France) David Gerard	MD Optimus	T1.2	03:08:40	00:01:36	3	(Belgium) Philippe Lambilliotte	MD Optimus	T1.2	16:13:50	00:35:25
6	1	(Belgium) Christian Femont	Mini	T1+	01:05:56		1	(Belgium) Pol Van Pollaert	MD Optimus	T1.2	16:55:06	
6	2	(Czech Republic) Tomas Ourednicek	Toyota	T1+	01:06:18	00:00:22	2	(Belgium) Christian Femont	Mini	T1+	17:10:09	00:15:03
6	3	(France) David Gerard	MD Optimus	T1.2	01:08:02	00:02:06	3	(Belgium) Philippe Lambilliotte	MD Optimus	T1.2	17:24:02	00:28:56
7	1	(Belgium) Pol Van Pollaert	MD Optimus	T1.2	05:24:25		1	(Belgium) Pol Van Pollaert	MD Optimus	T1.2	22:19:31	
7	2	(France) David Gerard	MD Optimus	T1.2	05:35:15	00:10:50	2	(France) David Gerard	MD Optimus	T1.2	23:09:09	00:49:38
7	3	(France) Guy Housset	MD Optimus	T1.2	06:00:40	00:36:15	3	(Belgium) Christian Femont	Mini	T1+	23:15:13	00:55:42
8	1	(Belgium) Christian Femont	Mini	T1+	05:07:41		1	(Belgium) Pol Van Pollaert	MD Optimus	T1.2	27:49:51	
8	2	(Czech Republic) Tomas Ourednicek	Toyota	T1+	05:26:27	00:10:05	2	(Belgium) Christian Femont	Mini	T1+	28:22:54	00:33:03
8	3	(France) David Gerard	MD Optimus	T1.2	05:26:27	00:18:46	3	(France) David Gerard	MD Optimus	T1.2	28:35:36	00:45:45
9	1	(Belgium) Christian Femont	Mini	T1+	04:27:32		1	(Belgium) Christian Femont	Mini	T1+	32:50:26	
9	2	(Italy) Andrea Schiumarini	Century	T1.2	04:33:34	00:06:02	2	(France) David Gerard	MD Optimus	T1.2	33:12:57	00:22:31
9	3	(France) David Gerard	MD Optimus	T1.2	04:37:21	00:09:49	3	(Belgium) Vincent Vroninks	Red Lined	T1.1	34:28:43	01:38:17
10	1	(Italy) Andrea Schiumarini	Century	T1.2	04:34:40		1	(France) David Gerard	MD Optimus	T1.2	37:55:05	
10	2	(Czech Republic) Tomas Ourednicek	Toyota	T1+	04:40:59	00:06:19	2	(Belgium) Christian Femont	Mini	T1+	38:08:54	00:13:49
10	3	(France) David Gerard	MD Optimus	T1.2	04:42:08	00:07:28	3	(Czech Republic) Tomas Ourednicek	Toyota	T1+	39:27:54	01:32:49
11	1	(Poland) Magdalena Zajac	Toyota	T1.1	01:13:35		1	(France) David Gerard	MD Optimus	T1.2	39:13:24	
11	2	(Italy) Andrea Schiumarini	Century	T1.2	01:14:03	00:00:28	2	(Belgium) Christian Femont	Mini	T1+	40:42:43	01:29:19
11	3	(Belgium) Vincent Vroninks	Red Lined	T1.1	01:17:08	00:03:33	3	(Belgium) Vincent Vroninks	Red Lined	T1.1	41:02:29	01:49:05
12	1	(Italy) Andrea Schiumarini	Century	T1.2	00:12:58							
12	2	(Hungary) Vaga Imre	Toyota	T1.1	00:13:54	00:00:56						
12	3	(France) David Gerard	MD Optimus	T1.2	00:14:53	00:01:55						

=== Truck ===
	Stage result						General classification					
Stage	Pos	Competitor	Make	Class	Time	Gap	Pos	Competitor	Make	Class	Time	Gap
1	Stage cancelled											
2	1	(Netherlands) Gerrit Zuurmond	MAN	T5.1	03:08:02		1	(Netherlands) Gerrit Zuurmond	MAN	T5.1	03:08:02	
2	2	(Netherlands) Mike Panhuijzen	MAN	T5.1	04:50:27	01:42:25	2	(Netherlands) Mike Panhuijzen	MAN	T5.1	04:50:27	01:42:25
2	3	(Belgium) Noel Essers	MAN	T5	04:51:22	01:43:20	3	(Belgium) Noel Essers	MAN	T5	04:51:22	01:43:20
3	1	(Netherlands) Gerrit Zuurmond	MAN	T5.1	06:41:01		1	(Netherlands) Gerrit Zuurmond	MAN	T5.1	09:49:03	
3	2	(Belgium) Noel Essers	MAN	T5.1	09:21:12	02:40:11	2	(Belgium) Noel Essers	MAN	T5.1	14:12:34	04:23:31
3	3	(Netherlands) Mike Panhuijzen	MAN	T5.1	09:27:07	02:46:06	3	(Netherlands) Mike Panhuijzen	MAN	T5.1	14:17:34	04:28:31
4	1	(Netherlands) Gerrit Zuurmond	MAN	T5.1	06:15:10		1	(Netherlands) Gerrit Zuurmond	MAN	T5.1	16:04:13	
4	2	(Belgium) Noel Essers	MAN	T5.1	06:52:34	00:37:24	2	(Belgium) Noel Essers	MAN	T5.1	21:05:08	05:00:55
4	3	(Netherlands) Mike Panhuijzen	MAN	T5.1	07:19:23	01:04:13	3	(Netherlands) Mike Panhuijzen	MAN	T5.1	21:36:57	05:32:44
5	1	(Netherlands) Gerrit Zuurmond	MAN	T5.1	03:47:30		1	(Netherlands) Gerrit Zuurmond	MAN	T5.1	19:51:43	
5	2	(Netherlands) Mike Panhuijzen	MAN	T5.1	04:12:38	00:25:08	2	(Netherlands) Mike Panhuijzen	MAN	T5.1	29:19:35	09:27:52
5	3	(Netherlands) Martin Roeterdink	DAF	T5.1	04:39:33	00:52:03	3	(Netherlands) Martin Roeterdink	DAF	T5.1	32:21:51	12:30:08
6	1	(Netherlands) Gerrit Zuurmond	MAN	T5.1	01:19:02		1	(Netherlands) Gerrit Zuurmond	MAN	T5.1	21:10:45	
6	2	(Netherlands) Mike Panhuijzen	MAN	T5.1	01:32:34	00:13:32	2	(Netherlands) Mike Panhuijzen	MAN	T5.1	30:52:09	09:41:24
6	3	(France) Franck Coquide	Renault	T5.1	01:57:44	00:38:42	3	(France) Franck Coquide	Renault	T5.1	38:18:37	17:07:52
7	1	(Netherlands) Gerrit Zuurmond	MAN	T5.1	08:43:50		1	(Netherlands) Gerrit Zuurmond	MAN	T5.1	29:54:35	
7	2	(Netherlands) Mike Panhuijzen	MAN	T5.1	11:30:00	02:46:10	2	(Netherlands) Mike Panhuijzen	MAN	T5.1	42:22:09	12:27:34
7	3	(France) Franck Coquide	Renault	T5.1	11:30:00	02:46:10	3	(France) Franck Coquide	Renault	T5.1	49:48:37	19:54:02
8	1	(France) Franck Coquide	Renault	T5.1	05:33:04		1	(Netherlands) Gerrit Zuurmond	MAN	T5.1	36:53:45	
8	2	(Netherlands) Gerrit Zuurmond	MAN	T5.1	06:59:10	01:26:06	2	(France) Franck Coquide	Renault	T5.1	57:51:41	20:57:56
8	3	(Netherlands) Martin Roeterdink	DAF	T5.1	08:48:15	03:15:11	3	(Netherlands) Martin Roeterdink	DAF	T5.1	61:15:06	24:21:21
9	1	(Netherlands) Gerrit Zuurmond	MAN	T5.1	05:41:17		1	(Netherlands) Gerrit Zuurmond	MAN	T5.1	42:35:02	
9	2	(Netherlands) Mike Panhuijzen	MAN	T5.1	09:05:06	03:23:49	2	(Netherlands) Martin Roeterdink	DAF	T5.1	76:25:06	33:50:04
9	3	(France) Franck Coquide	Renault	T5.1	14:25:00	08:43:43	3	(Netherlands) Mike Panhuijzen	MAN	T5.1	83:27:15	40:52:13
10	1	(Netherlands) Mike Panhuijzen	MAN	T5.1	16:55:00		1	(Netherlands) Gerrit Zuurmond	MAN	T5.1	59:45:02	
10	2	(Netherlands) Martin Roeterdink	DAF	T5.1	16:55:00	00:00:00	2	(Netherlands) Martin Roeterdink	DAF	T5.1	93:20:06	33:35:04
10	3	(Netherlands) Gerrit Zuurmond	MAN	T5.1	17:10:00	00:15:00	3	(Netherlands) Mike Panhuijzen	MAN	T5.1	100:22:15	40:37:13
11	1	(Netherlands) Gerrit Zuurmond	MAN	T5.1	01:33:19		1	(Netherlands) Gerrit Zuurmond	MAN	T5.1	61:18:21	
11	2	(Netherlands) Martin Roeterdink	DAF	T5.1	01:43:30	00:10:11	2	(Netherlands) Martin Roeterdink	DAF	T5.1	95:03:36	33:45:15
11	3	(Netherlands) Mike Panhuijzen	MAN	T5.1	01:46:49	00:13:30	3	(Netherlands) Mike Panhuijzen	MAN	T5.1	102:09:04	40:50:43
12	1	(Netherlands) Gerrit Zuurmond	MAN	T5.1	00:16:57							
12	2	(Netherlands) Martin Roeterdink	DAF	T5.1	00:20:09	00:03:12						
12	3	(France) Franck Coquide	Renault	T5.1	00:22:01	00:05:04						

=== Historic ===
	Stage result						General classification					
Stage	Pos	Competitor	Make	Class	Points	Gap	Pos	Competitor	Make	Class	Points	Gap
1	Stage cancelled											
2	1	(Argentina) Jorge Perez Companc	Toyota	2 Intermediate	395		1	(Argentina) Jorge Perez Companc	Toyota	2 Intermediate	395	
2	2	(France) Pierre Bordeau	Toyota	2 Intermediate	565	170	2	(France) Pierre Bordeau	Toyota	2 Intermediate	565	170
2	3	(France) Francois Xavier Bourgois	Range Rover	1 Intermediate	614	219	3	(France) Francois Xavier Bourgois	Range Rover	1 Intermediate	614	219
3	1	(Belgium) Dirk Van Rompuy	Toyota	2 Intermediate	70		1	(Argentina) Jorge Perez Companc	Toyota	2 Intermediate	587	
3	2	(France) Jean-Michel Villot	Mitsubishi	2 Intermediate	171	101	2	(France) Francois Xavier Bourgois	Range Rover	1 Intermediate	799	212
3	3	(France) Francois Xavier Bourgois	Range Rover	1 Intermediate	185	115	3	(France) Pierre Bordeau	Toyota	2 Intermediate	868	281
4	1	(Argentina) Jorge Perez Companc	Toyota	2 Intermediate	0		1	(Argentina) Jorge Perez Companc	Toyota	2 Intermediate	587	
4	2	(France) Francois Xavier Bourgois	Range Rover	1 Intermediate	0	0	2	(France) Francois Xavier Bourgois	Range Rover	1 Intermediate	799	212
4	3	(Belgium) Dirk Van Rompuy	Toyota	2 Intermediate	47	47	3	(Belgium) Dirk Van Rompuy	Toyota	2 Intermediate	944	357
5	1	(Germany) Dr. Erik Brandenburg	Porsche	1 Intermediate			1	(Argentina) Jorge Perez Companc	Toyota	2 Intermediate		
5	2	(Germany) Peter Lehmann	Porsche	1 Intermediate			2	(France) Francois Xavier Bourgois	Range Rover	1 Intermediate		
5	3	(Argentina) Jorge Perez Companc	Toyota	2 Intermediate			3	(Belgium) Dirk Van Rompuy	Toyota	2 Intermediate		
6	1	(Germany) Dr. Erik Brandenburg	Porsche	1 Intermediate			1	(Argentina) Jorge Perez Companc	Toyota	2 Intermediate		
6	2	(Germany) Peter Lehmann	Porsche	1 Intermediate			2	(France) Francois Xavier Bourgois	Range Rover	1 Intermediate		
6	3	(Argentina) Jorge Perez Companc	Toyota	2 Intermediate			3	(Belgium) Dirk Van Rompuy	Toyota	2 Intermediate		
7	1						1	(Argentina) Jorge Perez Companc	Toyota	2 Intermediate		
7	2						2	(France) Francois Xavier Bourgois	Range Rover	1 Intermediate		
7	3						3	(Belgium) Dirk Van Rompuy	Toyota	2 Intermediate		
8	1	(Argentina) Jorge Perez Companc	Toyota	2 Intermediate			1	(Argentina) Jorge Perez Companc	Toyota	2 Intermediate	666	
8	2	(Belgium) Dirk Van Rompuy	Toyota	2 Intermediate			2	(Belgium) Dirk Van Rompuy	Toyota	2 Intermediate	1128	
8	3	(France) Pierre Bordeau	Toyota	2 Intermediate			3	(France) Jean-Michel Villot	Mitsubishi	2 Intermediate	2195	
9	1	(Argentina) Jorge Perez Companc	Toyota	2 Intermediate	26		1	(Argentina) Jorge Perez Companc	Toyota	2 Intermediate	692	
9	2	(France) Pierre Bordeau	Toyota	2 Intermediate			2	(Belgium) Dirk Van Rompuy	Toyota	2 Intermediate	1181	489
9	3	(Belgium) Dirk Van Rompuy	Toyota	2 Intermediate	53	27	3	(France) Pierre Bordeau	Toyota	2 Intermediate	2463	1771
10	1	(Argentina) Jorge Perez Companc	Toyota	2 Intermediate	11		1	(Argentina) Jorge Perez Companc	Toyota	2 Intermediate	703	
10	2	(Belgium) Dirk Van Rompuy	Toyota	2 Intermediate	17	6	2	(Belgium) Dirk Van Rompuy	Toyota	2 Intermediate	1198	495
10	3	(Germany) Dr. Erik Brandenburg	Porsche	1 Intermediate			3	(France) Pierre Bordeau	Toyota	2 Intermediate	2206	1503
11	1						1	(Argentina) Jorge Perez Companc	Toyota	2 Intermediate	703	
11	2						2	(Belgium) Dirk Van Rompuy	Toyota	2 Intermediate	1198	495
11	3						3	(France) Pierre Bordeau	Toyota	2 Intermediate	2206	1503
12	1						1	(Argentina) Jorge Perez Companc	Toyota	2 Intermediate	703	
12	2						2	(Belgium) Dirk Van Rompuy	Toyota	2 Intermediate	1198	495
12	3						3	(France) Pierre Bordeau	Toyota	2 Intermediate	2206	1503

== Final standings ==
=== Bike ===
Final standings (podium)
Pos	No.	Driver	Vehicle	Class	Time	Gap
1	171	(Germany) Kevin Gallas	Yamaha	650+ Multicylinder	39:24:05	
2	21	(France) Paulin Gautier	Yamaha	650+ Multicylinder	39:24:46	00:00:41
3	176	(France) Jean-Loup Lepan	KTM	450	39:40:13	00:16:08

Final standings (4-70)
4	191	(Germany) Mike Wiedemann	Yamaha Ténéré 700	650+ Multicylinder	40:07:22	00:17:43
5	1	(Italy) Jacopo Cerutti	Aprilia Tuareg 660	650+ Multicylinder	41:02:30	01:38:25
6	109	(Portugal) Antonio Maio	Yamaha Ténéré 700	650+ Multicylinder	41:06:20	01:42:15
7	2	(Italy) Alessandro Botturi	Yamaha Ténéré 700	650+ Multicylinder	41:10:57	01:46:52
8	6	(Italy) Marco Menichini	Aprilia Tuareg 660	650+ Multicylinder	41:37:38	02:13:33
9	94	(France) Valentin Sertilhanges	KTM 450 Rally	450	42:38:19	03:14:14
10	80	(Czech Republic) Roman Krejci	KTM 450 Rally	450	43:35:05	04:11:00
11	95	(France) Amaury Baratin	KTM 450 Rally	450	44:44:23	05:20:18
12	124	(Belgium) Nicolas Charlier	Yamaha Ténéré 700	650+ Multicylinder	44:48:27	05:24:22
13	106	(France) Bertrand Gavard	Yamaha Ténéré 700	650+ Multicylinder	45:07:44	05:43:39
14	50	(Norway) Hans Kristian Dovland	KTM 450 RFR	450	45:54:24	06:30:19
15	150	(South Africa) Matthew Gird	Husqvarna 450 FR	450	46:34:46	07:10:41
16	92	(Netherlands) Stephan Savelkouls	Husqvarna 450 RR	450	46:39:01	07:14:56
17	12	(France) David Fretigne	Honda CRF 450 Rally	450	47:05:52	07:41:47
18	40	(Italy) Stefano Dogliotti	Kove 450 Rally	450	47:18:46	07:54:41
19	121	(Italy) Sebastiano Antonello	Kove 450 Rally	450	47:54:19	08:30:14
20	184	(France) Noa Sainct	KTM 450 EXC-F	450	47:55:12	08:31:70
21	128	(France) Max Bianucci	Husqvarna 450 Rally	450	48:12:50	08:48:45
22	13	(Portugal) Alexandre Azinhais	KTM 500 EXC-F	450+	48:18:03	08:53:58
23	28	(Belgium) Boris Wolters	Husquvarna 450 Rally	450	48:26:35	09:02:30
24	64	(France) Dominique Robin	Honda CRF 450 Rally	450	48:49:09	09:25:40
25	17	(Italy) Matteo Bottino	Kove 800x Rally Ls	650+ Multicylinder	48:49:12	09:25:70
26	61	(France) Jim Moisa	KTM 450 RFR	450	48:57:06	09:33:10
27	44	(Portugal) Gad Nachmani	KTM 450 Rally	450	49:19:30	09:55:25
28	89	(France) Thierry Traccan	Honda CRF 450 Rally	450	49:34:54	10:10:49
29	34	(France) James Simonin	Husqvarna 450 Rally	450	50:01:12	10:37:7
30	143	(France) Kévin Durand	Honda CRF 450 Rally	450	50:03:52	10:39:47
31	88	(France) Cédric Jacques	Husqvarna 450 Rally	450	50:09:14	10:45:9
32	123	(Italy) Fabio Lottero	KTM 500 EXC-F	450+	50:29:42	11:05:37
33	96	(Netherlands) Lejon Fokkema	Husqvarna 450 RR	450	50:57:56	11:33:51
34	122	(Italy) Andrea Vignone	GasGas Es 700	450+	52:10:23	12:46:18
35	66	(Netherlands) Hille Dalstra	Honda 450 Rally	450	52:21:27	12:57:22
36	86	(Spain) Carlos De Juan	KTM 450 Rally	450	53:24:36	14:00:31
37	41	(Switzerland) Mike Bächler	KTM 450 Rally	450	53:25:21	14:01:16
38	67	(France) Philippe Heraud	KTM 450 EXC	450	55:10:44	15:46:39
39	60	(France) Alex Yon	KTM 450 RFR	450	55:32:41	16:08:36
40	112	(Sweden) Stephan Wilhelmsson	KTM 450 Rally	450	55:49:39	16:25:34
41	114	(France) Thomas Barea Fernandez	KTM 450 EXC-F	450	57:41:20	17:18:15
42	76	(France) Hugh De Belloy	Husqvarna 450 Rally	450	58:36:42	12:19:37
43	35	(South Africa) Mark Johnston	Honda CRF 450 Rally	450	60:10:01	20:45:56
44	75	(Germany) Kai Fröhlich	KTM 450 Rally	450	62:01:15	22:37:10
45	19	(Austria) Luca Seppele	Kove 450 Ex	450	62:25:40	23:01:35
46	53	(Switzerland) Sylvain Martignoni	KTM 450 Rally	450	62:49:24	23:25:19
47	91	(France) Benoit Dalle Palle	KTM 450 EXC	450	63:05:39	23:41:34
48	120	(Sweden) Anders Berglund	KTM 450 RFR	450	63:58:27	24:34:22
49	110	(Italy) Francesco Montanari	Aprilia Tuareg 660	650+ Multicylinder	66:14:50	26:50:45
50	23	(Italy) Tommaso Bettini	Beta 480 RR	450+	67:35:19	28:11:14
51	20	(Italy) Mirco Bettini	Beta 480 RR	450+	67:52:20	28:28:15
52	168	(France) Jean-christophe Mangeart	Honda Red Moto CRF 450 RX Rally	450	67:53:11	28:29:6
53	25	(Germany) Jan Nikolaus Christian Winkler	Honda CRF 450 Rally	450	70:01:52	30:37:47
54	33	(South Africa) Martin Camp	Kove 450 EX	450	70:26:47	31:02:42
55	7	(France) Bruno Da Costa	Honda Translap 750	650+ Multicylinder	77:24:47	38:00:42
56	155	(France) Benjamin Cerovic	Honda CRF 450 Rally	450	78:40:31	39:16:26
57	115	(Switzerland) Remi Sailland	KTM 450 Rally	450	79:38:43	40:14:38
58	90	(Norway) Joachim Hellsten	KTM 450 RFR	450	83:12:36	40:14:38
59	111	(Canada) Timur Urakov	Yamaha Ténéré 700	650+ Multicylinder	85:35:03	46:10:58
60	56	(France) Jean-christophe Menard	Honda Transalp 750	650+ Multicylinder	85:42:16	46:18:11
61	69	(France) Alexis Raoux	Yamaha Ténéré 700	650+ Multicylinder	99:01:30	59:37:25
62	87	(Norway) Magnus Holsen Aasberg	KTM 450 RFR	450	100:50:11	61:26:06
63	32	(France) Joanny Dussurgey	GasGas RX 450 F	450	108:08:30	44:68:25
64	42	(Norway) Thomas Fathke	Husqvarna 450 FR	450	109:02:49	68:44:25
65	62	(Italy) Giuseppe Pozzo	KTM 500 EXC	450+	111:00:12	69:38:44
66	183	(France) Anthony Neves	KTM 690 Enduro R	450+	117:09:02	71:36:07
67	144	(Germany) Michael Riebel	KTM 450 Rally	450	118:19:22	77:44:57
68	97	(Senegal) Alexis Varagne	Yamaha Raptor 700R	Quad	118:51:59	79:27:54
69	18	(Belgium) Frédéric Richter	Kove 450 Rally	450	119:36:33	80:12:28
70	11	(France) Samuel Chamoin	Yamaha Ténéré 700	650+ Multicylinder	123:09:29	83:45:24

Motul Xtreme				Milwaukee Rookie		
Pos	No.	Rider	Make	No.	Rider	Make
1	94	(France) Valentin Sertilhanges	KTM	171	(Germany) Kevin Gallas	Yamaha
2	80	(Czech Republic) Roman Krejci	KTM 450 Rally	94	(France) Valentin Sertilhanges	KTM
3	95	(France) Amaury Baratin	KTM 450 Rally	121	(Italy) Sebastiano Antonello	Kove

Class	No.	Rider	Make
Junior (under 25)	184	(France) Noa Sainct	KTM
Veteran (over 40)	2	(Italy) Alessandro Botturi	Yamaha

=== SSV/T3/T4 ===
Final standings (podium)
Pos	No.	Driver Co-Driver	Vehicle	Class	Time	Gap
1	275	(Netherlands) Martijn Van Den Broek (Netherlands) Mike Daas	Can-Am Maverick 1000R	T4.1	41:56:38	
2	299	(Slovakia) Martin Benko (Slovakia) Marek Sykora	MCE5 T3M Taurus T3	T3.1	42:44:22	00:47:00
3	271	(Netherlands) Sander Derikx (Netherlands) Rob Buursen	Can-Am Maverick 1000R	T4.1	43:22:53	01:26:15

Final standings (4-16)
4	285	(France) Eric Bernard (France) Damien Derocq	Can-Am Maverick R	SSV3	44:20:56	02:24:18
5	279	(France) Philippe Champigné (France) Bruno Robin	Can-Am Maverick XRS	SSV3	46:14:38	04:18:00
6	256	(Belgium) Hans Den Ouden (Belgium) Dirk Goris	Can-Am Maverick X3	T4.1	47:48:11	05:51:33
7	253	(France) Jerome Cambier (France) Marion Andrieu	MMP FJ	T3.1	49:30:36	07:33:58
8	252	(Romania) Nicusor Duica (Romania) Nicoleta Duica	Can-Am Maverick	T4.1	49:43:16	07:46:38
9	250	(Italy) Enrico Gaspari (Italy) Paolo Ceci	Can-Am Maverick X3	T4.1	49:50:18	07:53:40
10	270	(Netherlands) Marcel Van Berlo (Netherlands) Olaf Harmsen	Can-Am Maverick 1000R	T4.1	49:52:26	07:55:48
11	266	(France) Olivier Goullioud (France) Thomas Gaidella	Polaris RZR Pro R	T4.1	50:38:44	08:42:06
12	260	(France) Jean-François Le Corre (Norway) Anette Fjeld	Can-Am Maverick R	SSV3	51:16:47	09:20:09
13	254	(Romania) Andreev Marian (Romania) Constantin Fantana	Can-Am Maverick R	SSV3	52:11:16	10:14:38
14	277	(France) Nicolas Davin (France) Jean Sembel	Can-Am Maverick R XRS	SSV3	55:27:42	13:31:04
15	273	(France) William Grarre (France) Vincent Ferri	Can-Am Maverick X3	T4.1	55:31:35	13:34:57
16	258	(Romania) Calin Camarasan (United Kingdom) Ferenc Fodor	Can-Am Maverick X3	SSV3	85:00:22	43:03:44

Class	No.	Driver	Make
T3	299	(Slovakia) Martin Benko (Slovakia) Marek Sykora	Taurus
T4	275	(Netherlands) Martijn Van Den Broek (Netherlands) Mike Daas	Can-Am
SSV	285	(France) Eric Bernard (France) Damien Derocq	Can-Am

=== Car ===
Final standings (podium)
Pos	No.	Driver Co-Driver	Vehicle	Class	Time	Gap
1	201	(France) David Gerard (France) Pascal Delacour	MD Optimus Rallye	T1.2	39:13:24	
2	215	(Belgium) Christian Femont (Belgium) Gregg Docx	Mini Cooper X-raid	T1+	40:42:43	01:29:19
3	200	(Belgium) Vincent Vroninks (Belgium) Dave Berghmans	Red Lined VK56	T1.1	41:02:29	01:49:05

Final standings (4-13)
4	205	(Belgium) Pol Van Pollaert (France) Anthony Pes	MD Optimus Rallye	T1.2	41:13:09	01:59:45
5	207	(Czech Republic) Tomas Ourednicek (Czech Republic) Lukas Bartak	Toyota Hilux	T1+	41:40:37	02:27:13
6	232	(Belgium) Philippe Lambilliotte (Belgium) François Béguin	MD Optimus Rallye	T1.2	42:24:17	03:10:53
7	230	(France) Guy Housset (France) Loic Minaudier	MD Optimus Rallye	T1.2	43:04:34	03:51:10
8	206	(Poland) Magdalena Zając (Poland) Błażej Czekan	Toyota Hilux	T1.1	43:09:47	03:56:23
9	236	(Italy) Andrea Schiumarini (Italy) Maurizio Gerini	Century CR6	T1.2	43:25:24	04:12:00
10	202	(Hungary) Varga Imre (Hungary) József Toma	Toyota Hilux	T1.1	80:37:11	41:23:47
11	210	(Belgium) Cedric Feryn (Belgium) Bjorn Burgelman	Toyota Landcruiser 200	Open A	107:31:53	68:18:29
12	243	(Japan) Hide Hirohashi (Japan) Mami Masuda	Suzuki Jimny	Open A	125:33:53	86:20:29
13	244	(Japan) Yoshimasa Sugawara (Japan) Naoko Matsumoto	Suzuki Jimny	Open A	136:53:23	97:39:59

Class	No.	Rider	Make
T1+	215	(Belgium) Christian Femont (Belgium) Gregg Docx	Mini
T1.1	200	(Belgium) Vincent Vroninks (Belgium) Dave Berghmans	Red Lined
T1.2	201	(France) David Gerard (France) Pascal Delacour	MD
Open	210	(Belgium) Cedric Feryn (Belgium) Bjorn Burgelman	Toyota

=== Truck ===
Final standings
Pos	No.	Driver Co-Driver Technician	Vehicle	Class	Time	Gap
1	400	(Netherlands) Gerrit Zuurmond (Netherlands) Tjeerd Van Ballegooij (Netherlands) Klaas Kwakkel	MAN TGA	T5.1	61:18:21	
2	410	(Netherlands) Martin Roeterdink (Netherlands) Roy Korenromp (Netherlands) Geralt Van Blik	DAF CF	T5.1	95:03:36	33:45:15
3	405	(Netherlands) Mike Panhuijzen (Netherlands) Pieter Kuypers (Netherlands) Eric Jan Hartjes	MAN TGA	T5.1	102:09:04	40:50:43
4	407	(France) Franck Coquide (France) Daniel Penkala (France) Jean-francois Delaval	Renault K520	T5.1	116:58:38	55:40:17

=== Historic ===
Final standings (podium)
Pos	No.	Driver Co-Driver	Vehicle	Class	Points	Gap
1	302	(Argentina) Jorge Pérez Companc (Argentina) Ezequiel Pérez Companc	Toyota HDJ 80	2 Intermediate	703	
2	322	(Belgium) Dirk Van Rompuy (Spain) Jan Rosa	Toyota HDJ 80	2 Intermediate	1198	495
3	355	(France) Pierre Bourdeau (France) Bruno Domy	Toyoya HJ 61	2 Intermediate	2206	1503

Final standings (4-21)
4	317	(France) Jean-michel Villot (France) Marie Tourneur	Mitsubishi Pajero Ralliart V6	2 Intermediate	2556	1853
5	344	(France) Serge Mogno (France) Olivier Moliere	Toyota HDJ 80	2 Intermediate	5616	4913
6	326	(France) Axel Berrier (France) Jeremy Athimon	Porsche 964 Dkr	2 Intermediate	5936	5233
7	352	(France) Philippe Voisin (France) Francois Costes	Toyota HDJ 100	3 Intermediate	6764	6061
8	300	(Germany) Dr. Erik Brandenburg (Germany) Marnie Brandenburg	Porsche 911 SC	1 Intermediate	7211	6508
9	333	(Germany) Jens-peter Siegel (Germany) Jonas Gebhard Allert	Land Rover Defender 90	1 Base	8438	7735
10	311	(Norway) Lars Rolner (Germany) Patrick Simon	Porsche 911 Safari	1 Intermediate	8446	7743
11	351	(France) Gilles Girousse (France) Jeremy Roiseux	Toyota HDJ 80	2 High	10362	9659
12	301	(Germany) Peter Lehmann (Germany) Tom Brandenburg	Porsche 911	1 Intermediate	14905	14202
13	385	(France) Edouard Dhondt (France) Laurent Bourgois	Peugeot 504	1 Intermediate	17867	17164
14	305	(France) Philippe Jacquot (France) Benoit Juif	Porsche 911	2 High	22569	21866
15	384	(France) François Xavier Bourgois (France) Patrice Auzet	Range Rover	1 Intermediate	25106	24403
16	330	(Spain) Alberto Herrero (Spain) Daniel Rebollares	Toyota HDJ 80	2 High	25358	24655
17	315	(France) Jean-francois Rocher (France) Philippe Laviron	Toyota HDJ 80	2 Intermediate	27026	26323
18	312	(France) Jonathan Metge (France) Elodie Metge	Range Rover	1 Base	28084	27381
19	307	(France) Sebastien Desprets (France) Jacques Devisme (France) Herve Darras	Renault Truck Kerax	Truck Base	32650	31947
20	304	(United Kingdom) Tom Lloyd Owen (United Kingdom) Matt Skeggs	Range Rover Classic V8	2 Base	55213	54510
21	354	(Belgium) Bart Vanhaverbeke (Belgium) Bart Descheemaeker	Mercedes 500 SLC	1 Intermediate	63183	62480

Class	No.	Driver	Make
Generation 1	300	(Germany) Dr. Erik Brandenburg (Germany) Marnie Brandenburg	Porsche
Generation 2	302	(Argentina) Jorge Pérez Companc (Argentina) Ezequiel Pérez Companc	Toyota
Generation 3	352	(France) Philippe Voisin (France) Francois Costes	Toyota
2x4	300	(Germany) Dr. Erik Brandenburg (Germany) Marnie Brandenburg	Porsche
