= Revolution Max =

V-twin motorcycle engine from Harley-Davidson

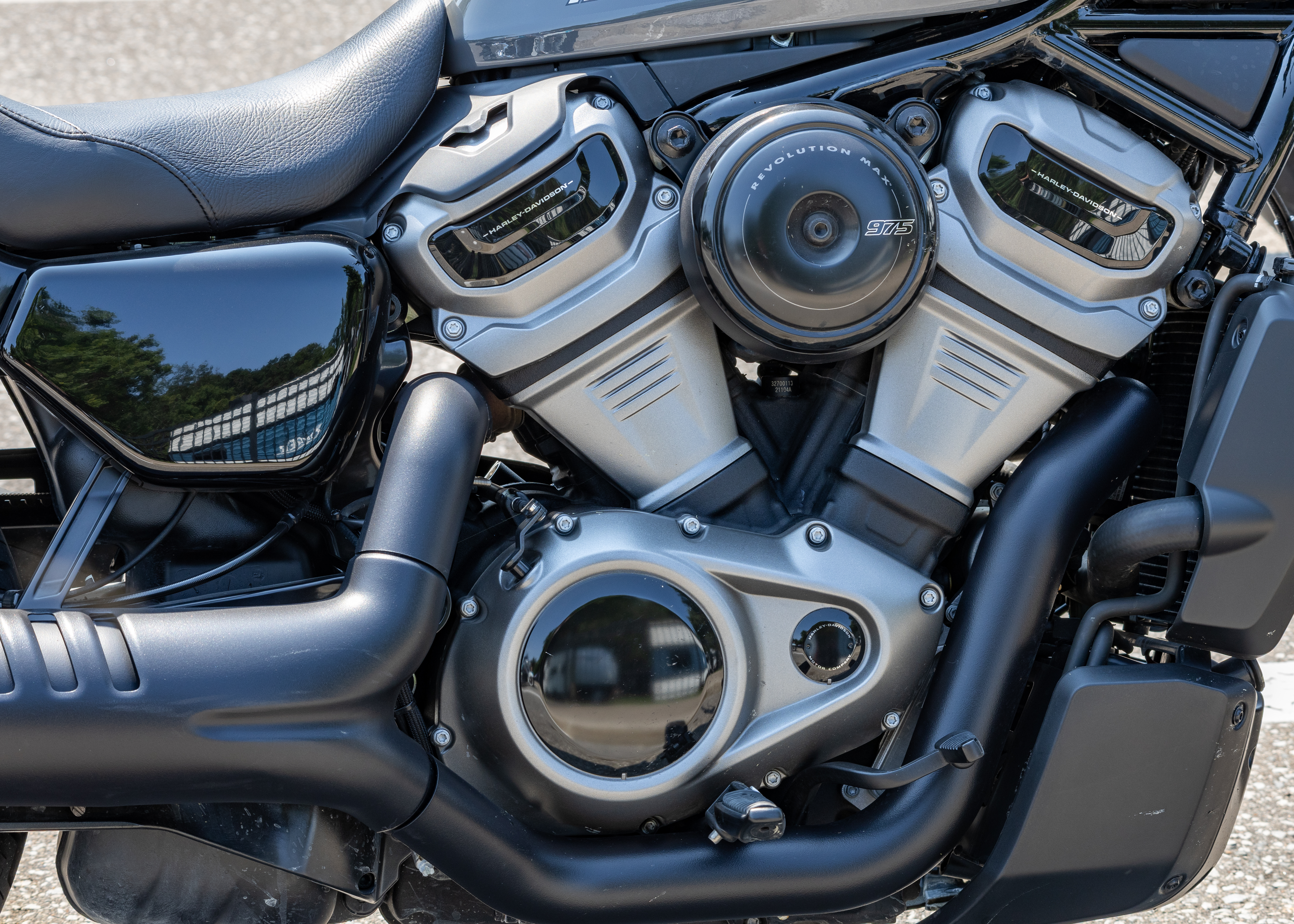
A Revolution Max 975T engine

The Revolution Max is a V-twin motorcycle engine from Harley-Davidson. It features double overhead camshafts and liquid cooling. It debuted in the Pan America adventure bike in February 2021. Harley-Davidson has announced this engine will eventually come in sizes ranging from 500cc to 1250cc. A variant of the Revolution Max called the 1250T saw use in the Sportster S, the first motorcycle under the Sportster nameplate to receive a new engine since 1986.

A 975cc version of the engine was announced for an upcoming streetfighter motorcycle called the Bronx, but that bike has been put on hold and may be cancelled. However, the engine was eventually introduced in the Nightster in 2022.
