= KTM 790 Adventure =

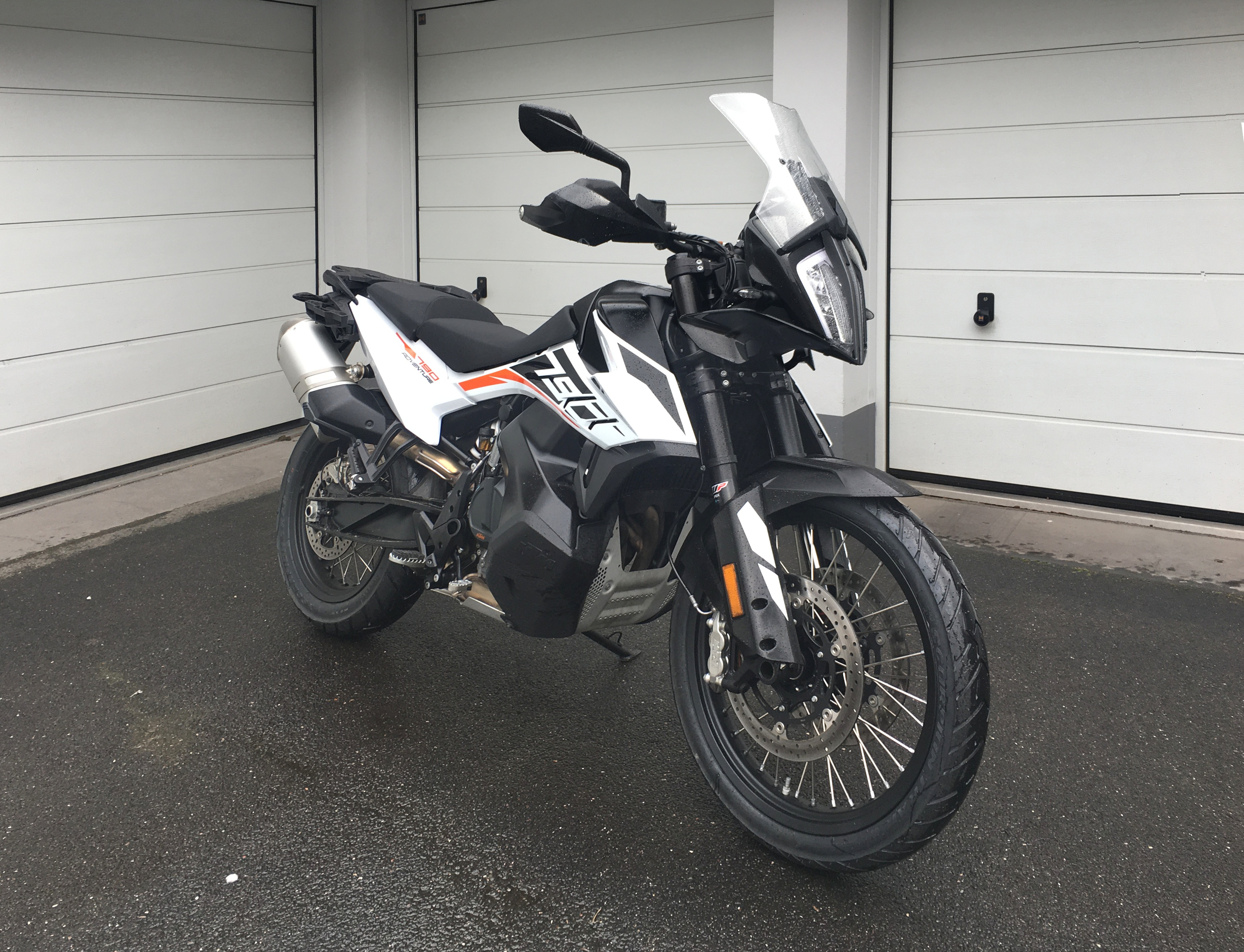
- Manufacturer: KTM
- Production: 2019-2021
- Successor: KTM 890 Adventure
- Engine: 799 cc (48.8 cu in) Four stroke, parallel twin cylinder, 285°, DOHC, 4 valves per cylinder
- Bore / stroke: 88 mm × 65.7 mm (3.46 in × 2.59 in)
- Power: 70 kW (94 hp)@ 8,000 rpm
- Torque: 87 N⋅m (64 lbf⋅ft) @ 6,600 rpm
- Frame type: CroMoly Tubular Steel, Engine as Stressed Member, Subframe: CroMoly Steel Trellis
- Wheelbase: 1,509 mm (59.4 in)
- Seat height: 850 mm (33 in)
- Weight: 203 kg (448 lb) (dry)
- Fuel capacity: 20 L (4.4 imp gal; 5.3 US gal)

The KTM 790 Adventure is a dual-sport motorcycle produced by the Austrian vehicle manufacturer KTM.

Due to its performance, price and position within the KTM product range, it falls into the mid-range category. A prototype of the 790 Adventure was first presented to the public at EICMA in 2017. At the EICMA 2018, the manufacturer presented the finished motorcycle in two versions. The market launch was in 2019. After only two years, the 790 Adventure was replaced by the 890 Adventure in 2021. Fast forward to 2023, and the 790 is back, but this time at a lower tier in the range, giving punters the option of a similar bike to a ‘full fat’ 890 at a reduced cost.

== Specifications ==
The 790 Adventure is powered by a 799 cc (88.0 mm bore, 65.7 mm stroke) LC8c inline-twin, four-stroke, water-cooled engine. The 790 Duke already had a similar engine. The engine of the 790 Adventure has a lower maximum power but a higher maximum torque, which makes it better suited to the demands of a dual-sport motorcycle.

== Variants ==
In 2019, the 790 Adventure was available in the base variant 790 Adventure, often referred to as S, and the more off-road oriented 790 Adventure R. The third model added to the 790 Adventure family in 2020 was the 790 Adventure R Rally limited to 500 copies.

== Recalls ==
Two motorcycles had to be called back for repairs due to problems with the brake system. In 2020, around 15,000 machines built in 2019 were recalled worldwide due to possible material deviations in the brake line. In another recall campaign in 2021, around 21,000 machines were recalled worldwide because the preload force of the return spring on the front wheel brake could have been outside the tolerance range and could have led to a functional impairment.
