= Aprilia Tuareg =

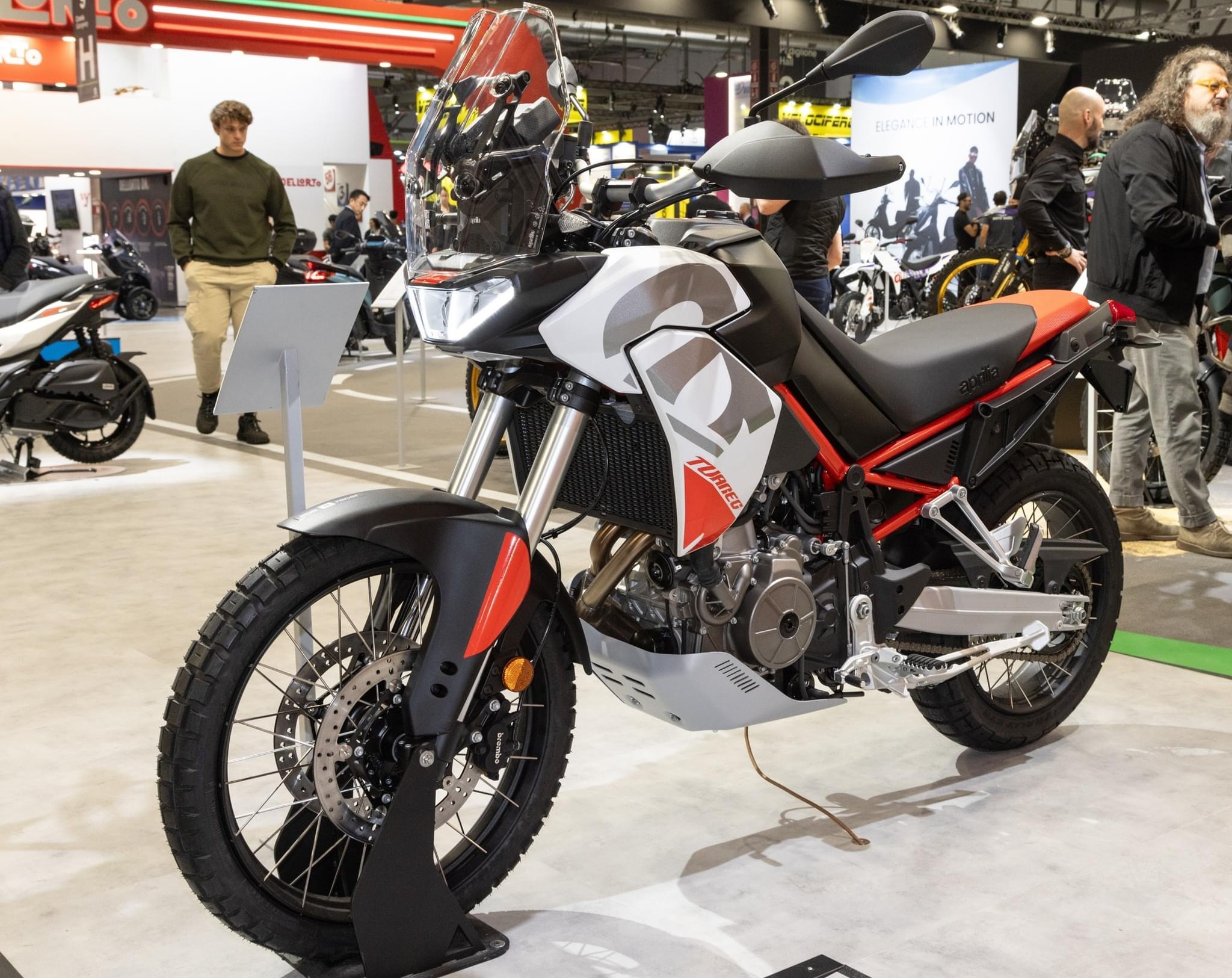
- 2025 Aprilia Tuareg 660
- Manufacturer: Aprilia
- Also called: Tuareg 660
- Production: 2021-present
- Predecessor: Aprilia Pegaso
- Engine: 659 cc (40 cu in) liquid-cooled 4-stroke parallel-twin
- Bore / stroke: 81 mm × 63.93 mm (3.189 in × 2.517 in)
- Power: 79 hp (59 kW) @ 9,250 rpm
- Torque: 51.63 lb⋅ft (70 N⋅m) @ 6,500 rpm
- Wheelbase: 59.1 in (1,500 mm)
- Seat height: 860 mm (34 in)
- Weight: 187 kg (412 lb) (dry)
- Fuel capacity: 18 L (4.0 imp gal; 4.8 US gal)
- Related: Aprilia Tuareg Rally

The Aprilia Tuareg is a dual-sport motorcycle produced by the Italian motorcycle manufacturer Aprilia.

== History ==
The Tuareg 660 was officially presented in November 2021 at EICMA.

== Specifications ==
The Tuareg 660 offers an engine, which is a 659 cm^{3} (40.2 cu in) in-line twin-cylinder with double overhead camshaft distribution and 270° connecting rod pins and has a gear driven counterbalancer, is capable of delivering 80 HP of maximum power at 9250 rpm and 70 Nm of torque at 6,500 rpm /min. The frame is tubular steel trellis for a total dry weight of the entire bike of 187 kg, the shock absorbers are both adjustable with a 43 mm Kayaba upside-down fork on the front.

The electronics are entrusted to Marelli who have dedicated the APRC system to the sports car which gives it 4 delivery settings (Urban, Explore, Individual and Off-road), 4-level traction control with off setting available on-the-fly using cruise control switch, ABS, 3 engine braking levels, anti-spin and a ride-by-wire throttle.
