= Harley-Davidson Pan America =

Motorcycle

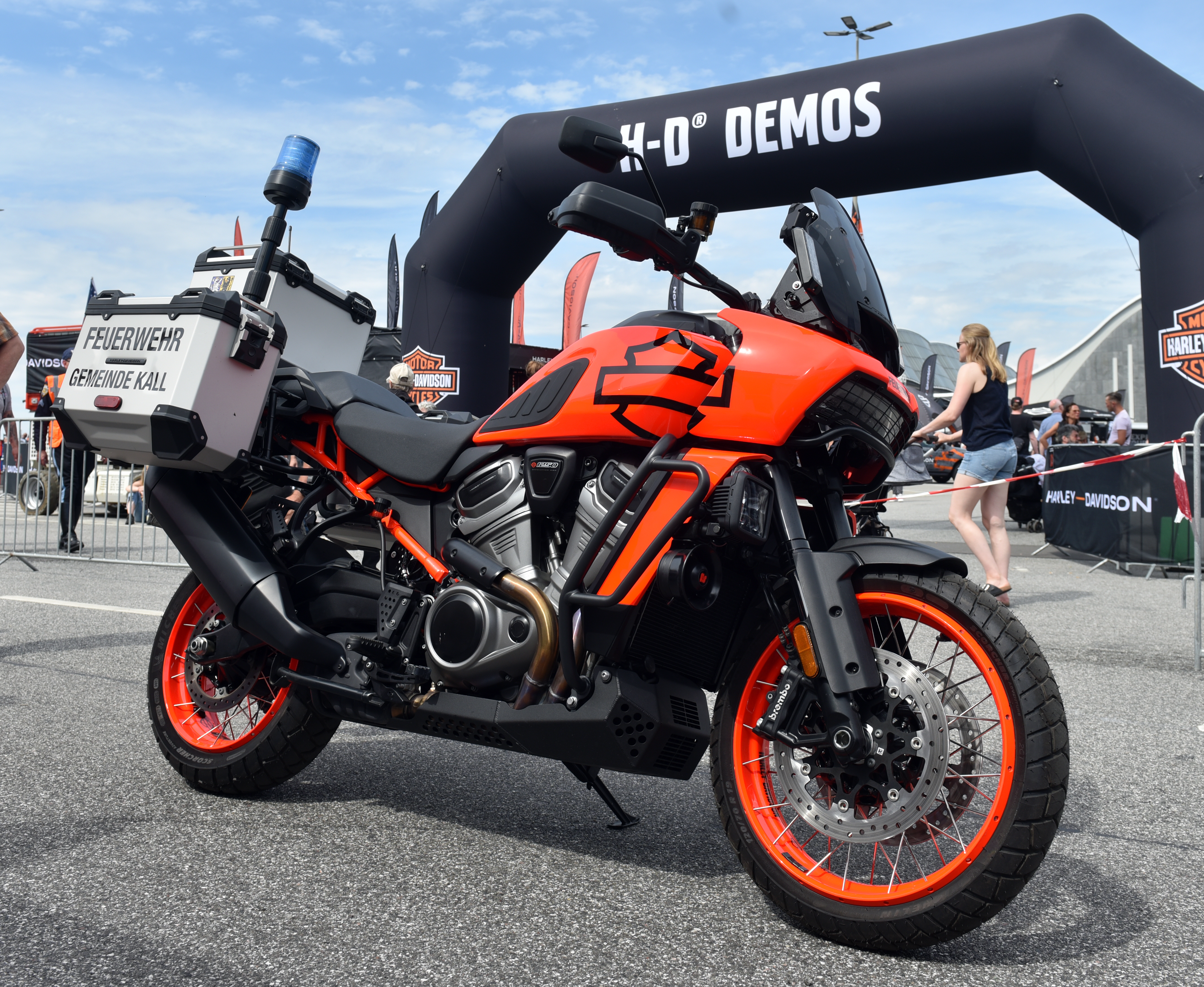
- Manufacturer: Harley-Davidson
- Production: 2020
- Class: Adventure, Sport-Touring/Dual Sport
- Engine: 1,250 cc 60 degree Revolution Max V-twin engine liquid-cooled
- Bore / stroke: 4.134 in x 2.846 in
- Compression ratio: 13.0:1
- Power: 150 hp @ 9000 rpm
- Torque: 94 ft-lb @ 6750 rpm
- Transmission: six speed
- Brakes: Front: radially mounted, monoblock, 4-piston caliper; Rear: floating, single piston caliper
- Wheelbase: 62.2 in
- Dimensions: L: 89.4 in
- Seat height: 32 in
- Weight: 505 lbs (dry); 540 lbs (wet)
- Fuel capacity: 5.6 gal
- Oil capacity: 4.75 qt

The Pan America is a motorcycle manufactured and marketed by Harley-Davidson, introduced in 2018 for the 2020 model year.

The motorcycle enters motorcycling's ADV (adventure) segment, straddles Adventure, Sport-Touring and Dual Sport descriptions, trading strength in a single area for adaptability to a variety of riding conditions: commuting, adventure touring, and to a lesser degree, off-road riding. The ADV segment had grown significantly prior to Harley Davidson's entry.

The Pan America is powered by a liquid-cooled 1,250 cc 60 degree Revolution Max V-twin engine. Industry analysts said it was most likely to compete with street-oriented adventure tourers like the BMW R1250GS.

During its ownership of the Buell Motorcycle Company, Harley Davidson offered a similar offroad-capable Ulysses XB12X, beginning in 2005.
