= KTM 890 Adventure =

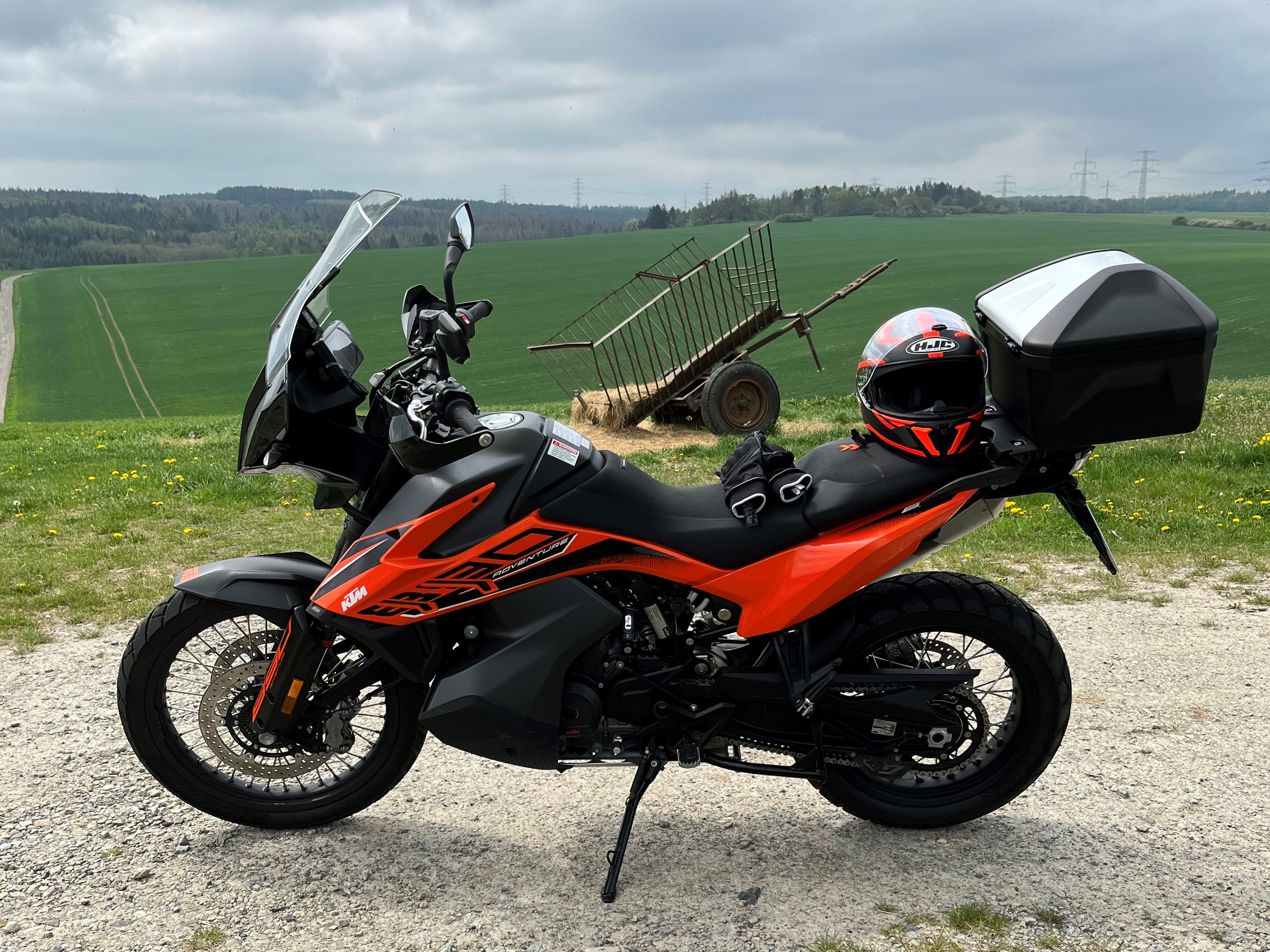
- Manufacturer: KTM
- Production: 2021-
- Predecessor: KTM 790 Adventure
- Engine: 889 cc (54.3 cu in) Four stroke, parallel twin cylinder,285°, DOHC, 4 valves per cylinder
- Bore / stroke: 90.7 mm × 68.8 mm (3.57 in × 2.71 in)
- Compression ratio: 13.5:1
- Power: 77 kW (103 hp) @ 8,000 rpm
- Torque: 100 N⋅m (74 lbf⋅ft) @ 6,500 rpm
- Transmission: 6 Speed
- Frame type: Chromium-Molybdenum-Steel frame using the engine as stressed element, powder coated
- Wheelbase: 1,529 mm (60.2 in)
- Seat height: 860 mm (34 in)
- Weight: 210 kg (460 lb) (dry)
- Fuel capacity: 20 L (4.4 imp gal; 5.3 US gal)

The KTM 890 Adventure is a dual-sport motorcycle produced by the Austrian vehicle manufacturer KTM. The motorcycle was presented in 2021 and is the successor to the KTM 790 Adventure.

== History ==
The 890 Adventure has been the successor to the KTM 790 Adventure since 2021. The increase in displacement by 90 cm^{3} (5.5 cu in) and the associated increase in performance corresponds to the general trend of other manufacturers who have increased the displacement of their mid-range motorcycle models to around 900 cm^{3} (55 cu in). In addition, the increase in displacement compared to the previous model should ensure more torque and smooth running in the lower and middle speed range.

== Specifications ==
The 890 Adventure's engine is a water-cooled, four-stroke parallel twin 889 cm^{3} (54.3 cu in) (bore 90.7 mm, stroke 68.8 mm) retaining the distinctive 285° crank offset of the original 790 LC8c 799 cm^{3} (48.8 cu in).

== Variants ==
Like its predecessor, the 890 Adventure is available in addition to the basic variant in a variant 890 Adventure R designed more for off-road driving, which accounts for about half of the total production. There is also the special model 890 Adventure R Rally, of which 500 were produced.
