= Africa Eco Race =

Northern Africa annual rally raid

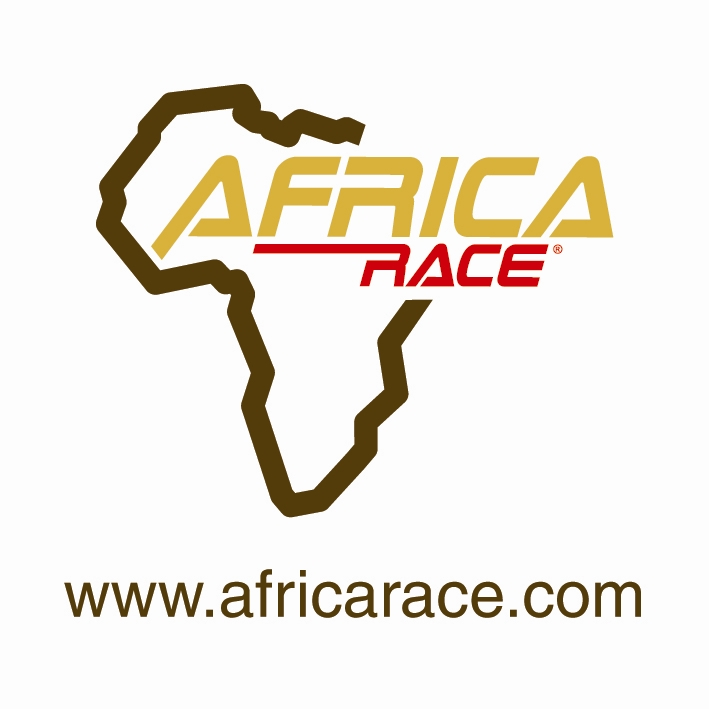
- Category: Rally raid
- Country: Europe and Africa
- Inaugural season: 2009
- Drivers' champion: (Germany) Kevin Gallas (Bike) (Netherlands) Martijn Van Den Broek (SSV) (France) David Gerard (Car) (Netherlands) Gerrit Zuurmond (Truck) (Argentina) Jorge Perez Companc (Historic)
- Constructors' champion: Yamaha(Bike); Can-Am (SSV); MD Optimus (Car); MAN (Truck); Toyota (Historic)
- Official website: www.africarace.com

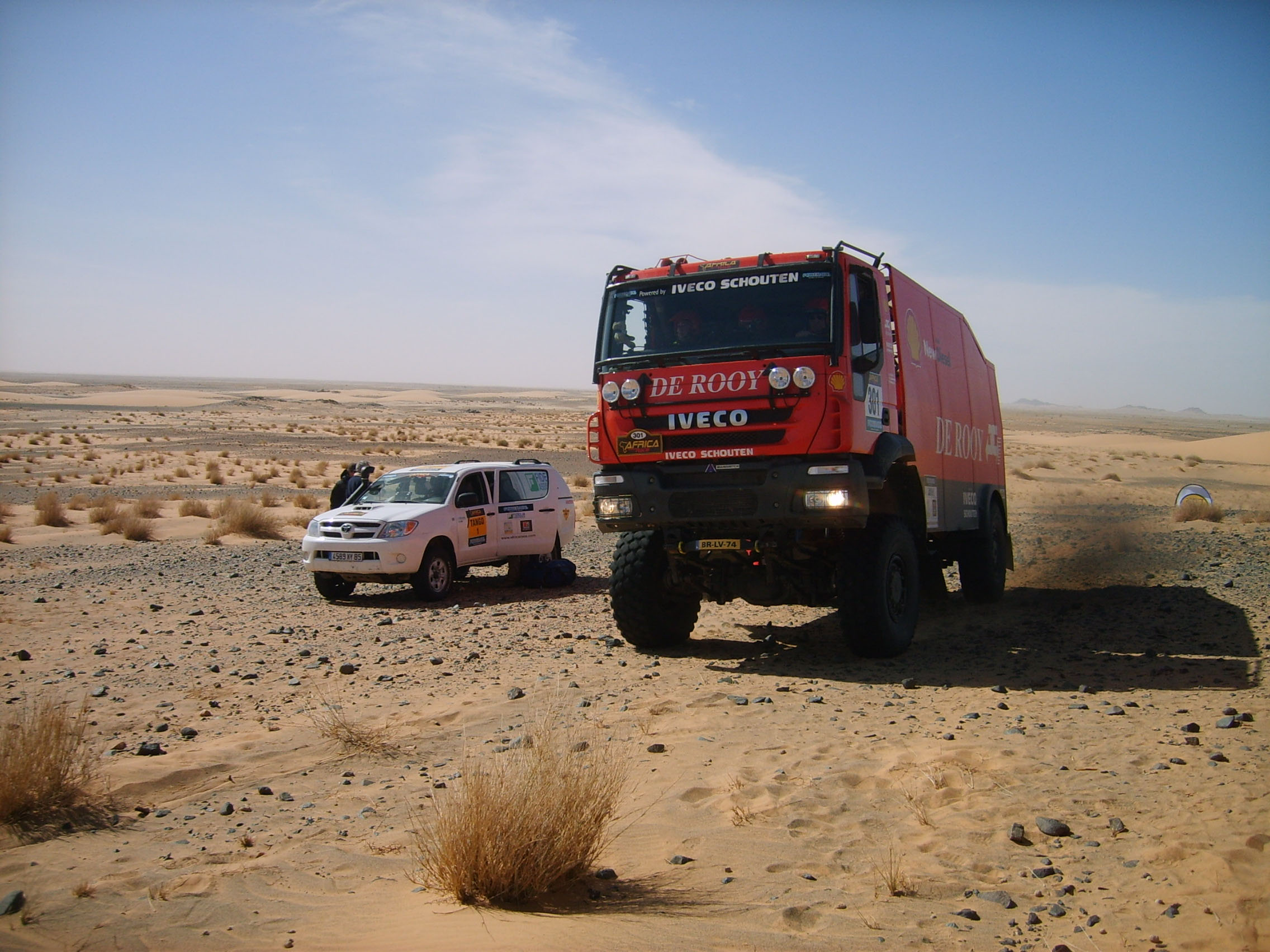
Passage of Jan de Rooy's truck through the Tijirit zone of Mauritania during the 2009 Africa Race.

Africa Eco Race is an annual rally raid, organised in France and run in North and West Africa, launched after the cancellation of 2008 Dakar Rally, and the subsequent moving of the rally to South America.

The rally claims to have innovated to give a special focus on security issues and sustainable development. In addition to the sporting aspect, the rally aims to put emphasis on individual awareness about eco-responsibility. Bivouacs are chosen far from cities and airport tarmac.

== History ==
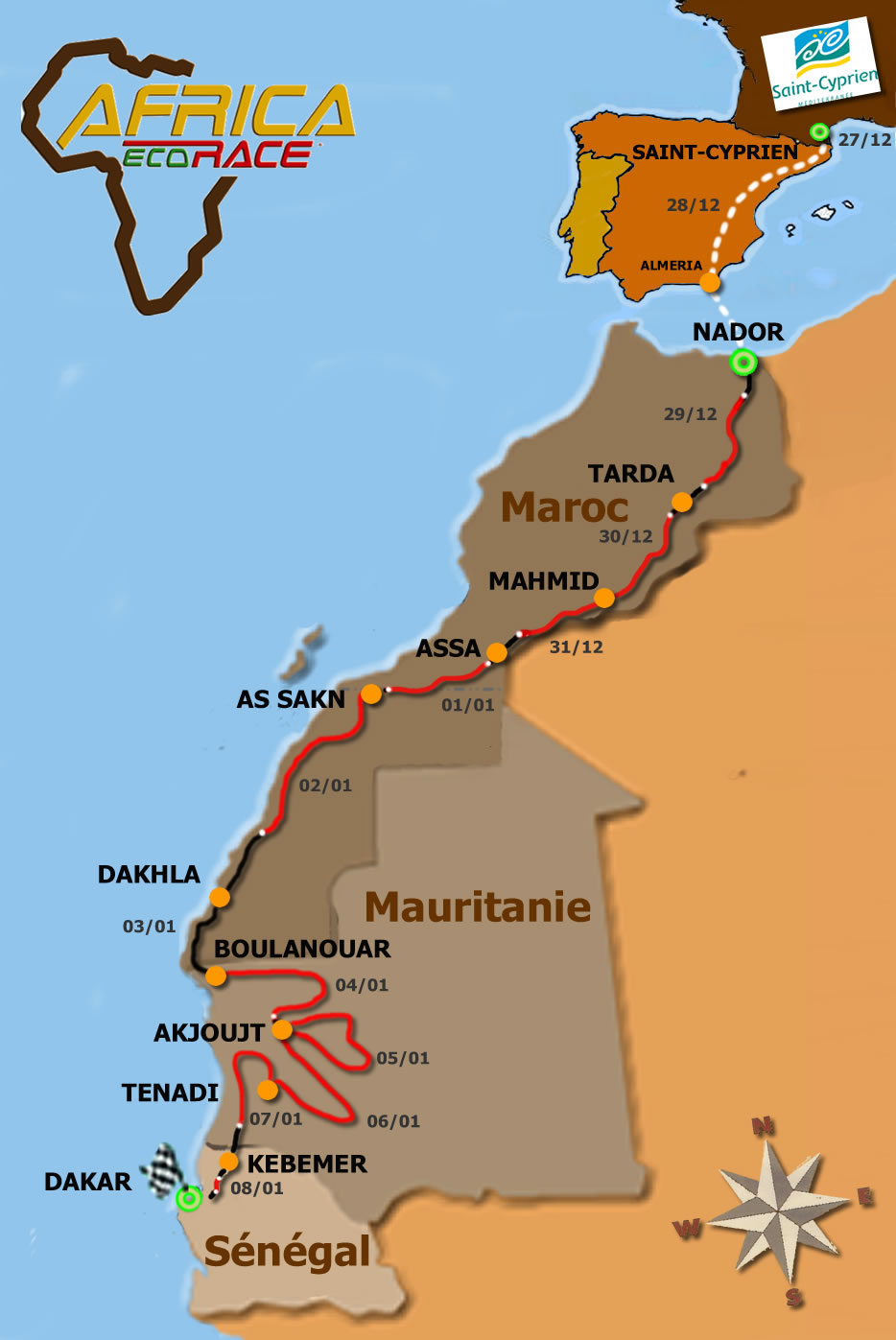
2012 Route

The Africa Eco Race Rally, intended for amateurs and professionals, lasts for more than 6500 km over 11 stages. The race crosses the territories of Morocco, Western Sahara, Mauritania and Senegal.

=== Editions ===
==== 2009 1st Edition ====
The 1st edition of the so-called Africa Race sailed from Marseille on December 26, 2008. The technical and administrative checks occurred on 26 and 27 December, the prologue took place on December 28, followed by embarkation and arrival in Nador, Morocco on 30 December.

==== 2010 2nd Edition ====
The second edition of the Africa Eco Race started from Portimão, Portugal where administrative and technical verifications took place on 27 and 28 of December 2009, preceded by a shakedown, in which the contestants could show and test their vehicles.

==== 2011 3rd Edition ====
The third edition took place from 27 December 2010 to 9 January 2011. The start was at Châteaux de Lastours and the arrival, as usual, was in Dakar, Senegal. This edition was the third victory in three editions for Jean-Louis Schlesser in cars, Willy Jobard with a hybrid ZONGSHEN in bikes and Czech Tomáš Tomeček in a Tatra truck.

==== 2012 4th Edition ====
The fourth edition made its departure on December 27, 2011, in Saint-Cyprien and arrived in Dakar on January 8, 2012. A fourth victory was claimed by Jean-Louis Schlesser in a buggy built by himself. The motorcycles title was won by Oscar Polli with a KTM and the trucks category was won by Tomáš Tomeček who got a second place in the overall ranking.

==== 2013 5th Edition ====
The fifth edition made its departure on December 28, 2012, in Saint-Cyprien and arrived on the shores of Lac Rose in Dakar on January 9, 2013. A fifth victory was taken by Jean-Louis Schlesser in a buggy built by himself. The motorcycles title was won by Martin Fontyn and the trucks category was won by Anton Shibalov with his Kamaz truck who finished second overall, ahead of Tomáš Tomeček and his Tatra truck.

==== 2014 6th Edition ====
The sixth edition made its departure December 29, 2013 in Saint-Cyprien and arrived on the shores of Lac Rose in Dakar on January 11, 2014 . A sixth consecutive victory was achieved by Jean-Louis Schlesser in a buggy built by himself, co-driven by Thierry Magnaldi. The motorcycle title was won by Michael Pisano with a Honda 450cc and Tomáš Tomeček took the trucks title with a Tatra.

==== 2015 7th Edition ====
The first edition without Jean-Louis Schlesser and with the return of the Kamaz official team, including an Hybrid truck. Jean Antoine Sabatier won the cars category with his Bugga One, the former Rally Dakar driver Pål Anders Ullevålseter won the bikes category while Anton Shibalov led his conventional Kamaz to the victory.

==== 2016 8th Edition ====
Departure from Monaco. Kanat Shagirov won the cars category with his Toyota Hilux Overdrive, while Pål Anders Ullevålseter and Anton Shibalov dominated completely motorcycles and truck categories.

==== 2017 9th Edition ====
Stage	Date	Start	Finish	Total (km)	Special (km)
Technical Check	26-27 December 2016	(France) Menton	Monaco	-	-
Boat Boarding	31 December 2016	Monaco	(France) Sète	-	-
Boat Travel	1 January	(France) Sète	(Morocco) Nador	-	-
1	2 January	(Morocco) Nador	(Morocco) Domaine Moulay	610.43	85.89
2	3 January	(Morocco) Domaine Moulay	(Morocco) Tagounite	393.1	369.94
3	4 January	(Morocco) Tagounite	(Morocco) Assa	525.35	433.07
4	5 January	(Morocco) Assa	(Morocco) Remz El Quebir	409.22	409.22
5	6 January	(Morocco) Remz El Quebir	(Morocco) Dakhla	696.31	456.67
Rest Day	7 January	(Morocco) Dakhla		-	-
6	8 January	(Morocco) Dakhla	(Mauritania) Tiwilit	744.42	172.54
7	9 January	(Mauritania) Tiwilit	(Mauritania) Tiwilit	439.54	414.27
8	10 January	(Mauritania) Tiwilit	(Mauritania) Azougui	453.69	425.44
9	11 January	(Mauritania) Azougui	(Mauritania) Akjoujt	464.35	390.96
10	12 January	(Mauritania) Akjoujt	(Mauritania) Akjoujt	482.31	423.65
11	13 January	(Mauritania) Akjoujt	(Senegal) Saint-Louis	546.53	208.02
12	14 January	(Senegal) Saint-Louis	(Senegal) Dakar	291.97	21.93
Total				6,057.22	3,811.6

Departure from Monaco. Russian Mini driver Vladimir Vasilyev won the cars' category, his fellow countryman Andrey Karginov captured the victory in the trucks' section, while 17-year-old Gev Sella from Israel claimed the bikes' title ahead of last year's winner Pål Anders Ullevålseter from Norway.

==== 2018 10th Edition ====
Stage	Date	Start	Finish	Total (km)	Special (km)
Technical Check	29-30 December 2017	(France) Menton	Monaco	-	-
Boat Boarding	31 December 2017	Monaco	(France) Sète	-	-
Boat Travel	1 January	(France) Sète	(Morocco) Nador	-	-
1	2 January	(Morocco) Nador	(Morocco) Dar Kaoura	639	92
2	3 January	(Morocco) Dar Kaoura	(Morocco) Agdal	479	443
3	4 January	(Morocco) Agdal	(Morocco) Assa	421	400
4	5 January	(Morocco) Assa	(Morocco) Fort Chacal	501	499
5	6 January	(Morocco) Fort Chacal	(Morocco) Dakhla	632	436
Rest Day	7 January	(Morocco) Dakhla		-	-
6	8 January	(Morocco) Dakhla	(Mauritania) Chami	650	211
7	9 January	(Mauritania) Chami	(Mauritania) Chami	508	486
8	10 January	(Mauritania) Chami	(Mauritania) Amodjar	478	439
9	11 January	(Mauritania) Amodjar	(Mauritania) Amodjar	486	34
10	12 January	(Mauritania) Amodjar	(Mauritania) Akjoujt	453	408
11	13 January	(Mauritania) Akjoujt	(Senegal) Saint-Louis	558	219
12	14 January	(Senegal) Saint-Louis	(Senegal) Dakar	292	2
Total				6,097	3,669

Departure from Monaco. French driver Mathieu Serradori and Fabian Lurquin won the car category for the first time as well, Paolo Ceci for Bike category and Gerard de Rooy, Darek Rodewald, Moi Torrellardona in truck category.

==== 2019 11th Edition ====
Stage	Date	Start	Finish	Total (km)	Special (km)
Technical Check	28-29 December 2018	(France) Menton	Monaco	-	-
Boat Boarding	30 December 2018	Monaco	Monaco	-	-
Boat Travel	31 December 2018	Monaco	(Morocco) Nador	-	-
1	1 January	(Morocco) Nador	(Morocco) La Momie	648.68	90.57
2	8 January	(Morocco) La Momie	(Morocco) Agdal	433.89	431.22
3	9 January	(Morocco) Agdal	(Morocco) Assa	415	400.71
4	10 January	(Morocco) Assa	(Morocco) Fort Chacal	494.57	492.75
5	11 January	(Morocco) Fort Chacal	(Morocco) Dakhla	638.4	419.37
Rest Day	12 January	(Morocco) Dakhla		-	-
6	13 January	(Morocco) Dakhla	(Mauritania) Chami	559.93	383.36
7	14 January	(Mauritania) Chami	(Mauritania) Chami	500.99	480.98
8	15 January	(Mauritania) Chami	(Mauritania) Amodjar	506.85	445.12
9	16 January	(Mauritania) Amodjar	(Mauritania) Amodjar	482.82	374.37
10	17 January	(Mauritania) Amodjar	(Mauritania) Akjoujt	519.86	471.58
11	18 January	(Mauritania) Akjoujt	(Senegal) Saint-Louis	556.2	217.69
12	13 January	(Senegal) Saint-Louis	(Senegal) Dakar	299.75	21.93
Total				6,056.94	4,229.65

==== 2020 12th Edition ====
Stage	Date	Start	Finish	Total (km)	Special (km)
Technical Check	3-4 January	(France) Menton	Monaco	-	-
Boat Boarding	5 January	Monaco	Monaco	-	-
Boat Travel	6 January	Monaco	(Morocco) Tangier	-	-
1	7 January	(Morocco) Tangier	(Morocco) Tarda	754.24	23.18
2	8 January	(Morocco) Tarda	(Morocco) Mhamid	333.13	329.47
3	9 January	(Morocco) Mhamid	(Morocco) Assa	516.31	497.44
4	10 January	(Morocco) Assa	(Morocco) Smara	404.53	385.39
5	11 January	(Morocco) Smara	(Morocco) Dakhla	686.1	473.17
Rest Day	12 January	(Morocco) Dakhla		-	-
6	13 January	(Morocco) Dakhla	(Mauritania) Chami	559.93	176.57
7	14 January	(Mauritania) Chami	(Mauritania) Aidzidine	477.95	477.95
8	15 January	(Mauritania) Aidzidine	(Mauritania) Tidjikja	450.83	429.01
9	16 January	(Mauritania) Tidjikja	(Mauritania) Tidjikja	469.11	415.07
10	17 January	(Mauritania) Tidjikja	(Mauritania) Idini	600.59	499.46
11	18 January	(Mauritania) Idini	(Senegal) Saint-Louis	473.65	187.16
12	19 January	(Senegal) Saint-Louis	(Senegal) Dakar	299.75	21.93
Total				6,026.12	3,915.8

==== 2021 13th Edition ====
The race was cancelled due to health risks associated with the COVID-19 pandemic.

==== 2022 14th Edition ====
Stage	Date	Start	Finish	Total (km)	Special (km)
Check In	14 October	(France) Menton	Monaco	-	-
Technical Check	15 October	Monaco	Monaco	-	-
Boat Boarding	16 October	Monaco	(France) Sète	-	-
Boat Travel	17 October	(France) Sète	(Morocco) Nador	-	-
1	18 October	(Morocco) Nador	(Morocco) Bousaid	605.18	93.97
2	19 October	(Morocco) Bousaid	(Morocco) Tagounite	466.33	447.95
3	20 October	(Morocco) Tagounite	(Morocco) Assa	526.34	465.89
4	21 October	(Morocco) Assa	(Morocco) Remz El Quebir	455.42	455.42
5	22 October	(Morocco) Remz El Quebir	(Morocco) Dakhla	691.77	450.82
Rest Day	23 October	(Morocco) Dakhla		-	-
6	24 October	(Morocco) Dakhla	(Mauritania) Chami	634.68	204.63
7	25 October	(Mauritania) Chami	(Mauritania) Akjoujt	514.66	470.16
8	26 October	(Mauritania) Akjoujt	(Mauritania) Akjoujt	447.85	423.80
9	27 October	(Mauritania) Akjoujt	(Mauritania) Ouad Naga	435.56	411.77
10	28 October	(Mauritania) Ouad Naga	(Mauritania) Ouad Naga	478.18	456.04
11	29 October	(Mauritania) Ouad Naga	(Senegal) Mpal	456.18	122.21; 65.48
12	30 October	(Senegal) Mpal	(Senegal) Dakar	271.08	21.93
Total				5,983.23	4,090.07

A later start date in the year than normal due to the ongoing effects of the pandemic. The event started in Monaco before travelling overseas to Nador, Morocco. The route took the participants through Morocco, Mauritania, and finally Senegal where the event finished in Dakar.

This was the first year for the "Raid" category which is a non-competitive class for motorcycles over 650cc.

==== 2025 16th Edition ====
2026 17th Edition

== Environment and sustainable development ==
Both the participants and the organization make a commitment to take care not to leave harmful traces of their passage through countries. A series of projects will aim to use renewable resources to a long-term contribution to the lives of people in remote areas of several countries that the race will cross. These actions are tangible and lasting.

The organization is leading the way, giving all participants reusable flatware kits for any event. Some organization vehicles are equipped with solar panels to use the energy stored during the day to carry out their missions.

The organization of the Africa Eco Race also created two projects for power generation using photovoltaic panels in Mauritania to power a school in Nouakchott and a library in Chinguetti.

For the environment, was created a category for experimental vehicles powered by renewable energy, designed to test at large scale and under extreme conditions, the reliability, power, strength and endurance of these vehicles. In 2011 Africa Eco Race funded the planting of 3000 eucalyptus in Nouakchott, Mauritania.

However, the race organisation has refused to create any dialogue with the Polisario over rally access to Western Sahara.

== Vehicles, categories, and classification ==
There are four ways of participating in the AER with the full race, the classic race, and the two non-race raid events for bikes and cars.

=== Race ===
==== Motorcycle category ====
The categories for the motorcycles and quads follow the French Motorcycle Federation Sporting Codes and the Supplementary Regulations. They differ between the website and the full regulations.

As of the 2025 event, the categorisation changed its numbering scheme.

2025 Onwards				Up to 2024			
Category	Class	Identifier	Description	Category	Class	Identifier	Description
1		450cc	Up to 450cc	2	Group 1	-450	Up to 450cc
2		+450cc	Over 450cc	2	Group 2	Q	Quad
3			Multicylinder: +650 to 1000 cc	4		+450	Over 450cc
4			Multicylinder: +1000 cc	5		OP	Open
5			Experimental	6		650m	Over 650cc and under 1000cc multicylinder
6	G		Competition Quad: Powered by the action of two wheels (2-wheel drive)	6		1000m	1000cc and over multicylinder
6	H		Competition Quad: Powered by the action of four wheels (4-wheel drive)	7		EXP	Experimental
	1		Female		1		Female
	2		Junior (under 25 years)		2		Junior
	3		Veteran (over 45 years)		3		Veteran
	4		Malle Moto (Motul Xtreme Rider)		4		Malle Moto (Motul Xtreme Rider)
	5		Rookie Rider (by Acerbis)		5		Rookie

==== SSV, Car, Truck categories ====
The cars and trucks are organized in accordance with the FIA International Sporting Code and its Annexes, the FFSA Sporting Regulations and the current Supplementary Regulations.

Cars			Truck		
Category	Class	Description	Category	Class	Description
T1	T1.+	Prototype Cross-Country Cars Thermic	T5	T5.1	10L or over
T1	T1.U	Prototype Cross-Country Cars "Ultimate"	T5	T5.2	Under 10L
T1	T1.1	4x4 Petrol Prototype Cross-Country Cars			
T1	T1.2	4x4 Diesel Prototype Cross-Country Cars			
T1	T1.3	4x2 Petrol Prototype Cross-Country Cars			
T1	T1.4	4x2 Diesel Prototype Cross-Country Cars			
T1	T1.5	Vehicles complying with SCORE regulations			
T2	T2.1	Petrol Series Production Cross-Country Cars			
T2	T2.2	Diesel Series Production Cross-Country Cars			
T3	T3.1	Lightweight Prototype Cross-Country Vehicles			
T3	T3.U	Lightweight Prototype Cross-Country Vehicles			
T4		Modified Production Cross-Country Side-by-Side Vehicles			
SSV Xtreme	SSV.1	SSV with atmospheric engine: 825 kg			
SSV Xtreme	SSV.2	SSV without turbo engine and over 1000cc with engines up to 2 litres: minimum 1150 kg and outer diameter of tyres: 32 inches maximum			
SSV Xtreme		SSV with turbo engine: 925 kg			
Experimental	EXP	Alternative energy vehicles			
Open		Cross-Country vehicle with rigid axles			
AER Open		Cross-Country vehicle with an AER Passport			

==== Classifications ====
The categories are in accordance with the FFM Sporting Codes and the Supplementary Regulations and differ from the full regulations and FIM.

Bikes			Cars			Truck		
Category	Class	Positions	Category	Class	Positions	Category	Class	Positions
2	-450	1st place, gold medalist(s) 2nd place, silver medalist(s) 3rd place, bronze medalist(s)	General		1st place, gold medalist(s) 2nd place, silver medalist(s) 3rd place, bronze medalist(s)	T5	T5.1	1st place, gold medalist(s)
4	+450	1st place, gold medalist(s) 2nd place, silver medalist(s) 3rd place, bronze medalist(s)	T1	T1.+	1st place, gold medalist(s)	T5	T5.2	1st place, gold medalist(s)
5	OP	1st place, gold medalist(s)	T1	T1.U	1st place, gold medalist(s)			
6	650m	1st place, gold medalist(s) 2nd place, silver medalist(s) 3rd place, bronze medalist(s)	T1	T1.1	1st place, gold medalist(s)			
6	1000m	1st place, gold medalist(s) 2nd place, silver medalist(s) 3rd place, bronze medalist(s)	T1	T1.2	1st place, gold medalist(s)			
7	EXP	1st place, gold medalist(s)	T1	T1.3	1st place, gold medalist(s)			
	1	1st place, gold medalist(s)	T1	T1.4	1st place, gold medalist(s)			
	2	1st place, gold medalist(s)	T1	T1.5	1st place, gold medalist(s)			
	3	1st place, gold medalist(s)	T2	T2.1	1st place, gold medalist(s)			
	Senegalese	1st place, gold medalist(s)	T2	T2.2	1st place, gold medalist(s)			
			T3		1st place, gold medalist(s)			
			EXP		1st place, gold medalist(s)			
			Open		1st place, gold medalist(s)			
			AER Open		1st place, gold medalist(s)			
			Solo		1st place, gold medalist(s)			
			Car -2L		1st place, gold medalist(s)			
			Senegalese		1st place, gold medalist(s)			
			SSV		1st place, gold medalist(s) 2nd place, silver medalist(s) 3rd place, bronze medalist(s)			

=== Non-race ===
==== Classic ====
Introduced for the 15th Edition in 2024. These vehicles run on a regularity rally point scoring system.

Generations			Groups		Engines
Generation	Year of Construction	Description	Group	Description	Engine
1	1970 - 1986		2x4	2-wheel drive vehicles	Petrol
2	1987 - 1996		4x4	4-wheel drive vehicles	Diesel
3	1997 - 2007		6x6+	6-wheel drive and more vehicles	
SCORE	2007	Comply with SCORE USA regulations			
Truck	1970 - 2007				

Competitors choose at the start of the rally an average speed category to cover the Regularity Zones: low, intermediate, high. The choice for the first stages must be made during the technical checks and may be reviewed from the rest day for the final stages. The High average is the reference base defined by the organization.

Gen.	Group	Engine	Average High Base	Average Intermediate Base-10%	Average Low Base-20%
1	2x4	Petrol	✔	✔	✔
1	2x4	Diesel	✔	✔	✔
1	4x4	Petrol	✔	✔	✔
1	4x4	Diesel	✔	✔	✔
2	2x4	Petrol	✔	✔	✘
2	2x4	Diesel	✔	✔	✘
2	4x4	Petrol	✔	✔	✘
2	4x4	Diesel	✔	✔	✘
3	2x4	Petrol	✔	✔	✘
3	2x4	Diesel	✔	✔	✘
3	4x4	Petrol	✔	✔	✘
3	4x4	Diesel	✔	✔	✘
SCORE	2x4	Petrol	✔	✔	✘
SCORE	2x4	Diesel	✔	✔	✘
SCORE	4x4	Petrol	✔	✔	✘
SCORE	4x4	Diesel	✔	✔	✘
Truck	4x4	Diesel	✔	✔	✔
Truck	6x6+	Diesel	✔	✔	✔

==== Bike Raid ====
The Bike Raid is a non-competitive event for solo riders on bikes considered trail or maxi-trail from 450cc with a minimum range autonomy of 300 km.

==== Car Raid ====
The Car Raid is a non-competitive event for either production or specially prepared cars, SSVs, and trucks with a minimum of two crew and a minimum range autonomy of 400 km.

== List of winners ==
=== Cars, bikes, trucks ===
Year	Route	Cars		Bikes		Trucks	
Year	Route	Driver	Constructor	Driver	Constructor	Driver	Constructor
2009	(France) Marseille – (Senegal) Dakar	(France) Jean-Louis Schlesser (France) Cyril Esquirol	Schlesser-Renault Buggy	(Spain) Josè Manuel Pellicer	BMW 450 X	(Netherlands) Jan de Rooy (Belgium) Dany Colebunders (Poland) Darek Rodewald	Iveco
2010	(Portugal) Portimão – (Morocco) Agadir – (Senegal) Dakar	(France) Jean-Louis Schlesser (France) Cyril Esquirol	Schlesser-Renault Buggy	(Italy) Marco Capodacqua	KTM	(Hungary) Miklós Kovács (Hungary) Péter Czeglédi (Hungary) Tomas Toth	Scania
2011	(France) Chateau Lastour – (Senegal) Dakar	(France) Jean-Louis Schlesser (France) Cyril Esquirol	Schlesser-Renault Buggy	(France) Willy Jobard	ZONGSHEN Hybrid	(Czech Republic) Tomáš Tomeček (Czech Republic) Vojtěch Morávek	Tatra
2012	(France) Saint-Cyprien – (Morocco) Nador – (Senegal) Dakar	(France) Jean-Louis Schlesser (France) Cyril Esquirol	Schlesser-Renault Buggy	(Italy) Oscar Polli	KTM	(Czech Republic) Tomáš Tomeček (Czech Republic) VojtěCarsorávek	Tatra
2013	(France) Saint-Cyprien – (Morocco) Nador – (Senegal) Dakar	(France) Jean-Louis Schlesser (France) Cyril Esquirol	Schlesser-Renault Buggy	(Belgium) Martin Fontyn	KTM	(Russia) Anton Shibalov (Russia) Evgeny Yakovlev (Russia) Dmitry Sotnikov	Kamaz
2014	(France) Saint-Cyprien – (Morocco) Nador – (Senegal) Dakar	(France) Jean-Louis Schlesser (France) Thierry Magnaldi	Schlesser-Renault Buggy	(France) Michael Pisano	Honda	(Czech Republic) Tomáš Tomeček (Czech Republic) Vojtěch Morávek	Tatra
2015	(France) Saint-Cyprien – (Morocco) Nador – (Senegal) Dakar	(France) Jean Antoine Sabatier (France) Jean-Luc Rojat	Bugga One	(Norway) Pål Anders Ullevålseter	KTM	(Russia) Anton Shibalov (Russia) Robert Amatych (Russia) Almaz Khisamiev	Kamaz
2016	Monaco – (Morocco) Nador – (Senegal) Dakar	(Kazakhstan) Kanat Shagirov (Kazakhstan) Vitaliy Yevtyekhov	Toyota Hilux Overdrive	(Norway) Pål Anders Ullevålseter	KTM	(Russia) Anton Shibalov (Russia) Robert Amatych (Russia) Almaz Khisamiev	Kamaz
2017	Monaco – (Morocco) Nador – (Senegal) Dakar	(Russia) Vladimir Vasilyev (Russia) Konstantin Zhiltsov	Mini	(South Africa) Gev Sella	KTM	(Russia) Andrey Karginov (Russia) Andrey Mokeev (Russia) Dmitrii Nikitin	Kamaz
2018	Monaco – (Morocco) Nador – (Senegal) Dakar	(France) Mathieu Serradori (Belgium) Fabian Lurquin	LCR 30	(Italy) Paolo Ceci	KTM	(Netherlands) Gerard de Rooy (Poland) Darek Rodewald (Spain) Moi Torrallardona	Iveco
2019	Monaco – (Morocco) Nador – (Senegal) Dakar	(France) Jean Pierre Strugo (France) François Borsotto	Optimus MD	(Italy) Alessandro Botturi	Yamaha	(Portugal) Elisabete Jacinto (Portugal) José Marques (Portugal) Marco Cochinho	MAN
2020	Monaco – (Morocco) Tangier – (Senegal) Dakar	(France) Patrick Martin (France) Lucas Martin	Mercedes	(Italy) Alessandro Botturi	Yamaha	(Hungary) Miklós Kovács (Hungary) Péter Czeglédi (Hungary) Laszló Ács	Scania
~~2021~~	Not held due to COVID-19 pandemic						
2022	Monaco – (Morocco) Nador – (Senegal) Dakar	(France) Philippe Gosselin (France) Christophe Crespo	Optimus MD	(Slovakia) Štefan Svitko	KTM	(Czech Republic) Tomáš Tomeček	Tatra
~~2023~~	Not held due to flooding in Senegal						
2024	Monaco – (Morocco) Nador – (Senegal) Dakar	(France) Gautier Paulin (France) Remi Boulanger	Apache	(Italy) Jacopo Cerutti	Aprilia	(Czech Republic) Tomáš Tomeček	Tatra
2025	Monaco – (Morocco) Dakhla – (Senegal) Dakar	(France) Benoît Fretin (France) Cédric Duplé	Century CR6	(Italy) Jacopo Cerutti	Aprilia	(Netherlands) Gerrit Zuurmond (Netherlands) Tjeerd Van Ballegooij (Netherlands) Klaas Kwakkel	MAN SE
2026	(Morocco) Tangier – (Morocco) Dakhla – (Senegal) Dakar	(France) David Gerard (France) Pascal Delacour	MD Optimus Rallye	(Germany) Kevin Gallas	Yamaha	(Netherlands) Gerrit Zuurmond (Netherlands) Tjeerd Van Ballegooij (Netherlands) Klaas Kwakkel	MAN TGA

=== SSVs, Historics ===
Year	Route	SSVs		Historics	
Year	Route	Driver	Constructor	Driver	Constructor
2017	Monaco – (Morocco) Nador – (Senegal) Dakar	(France) Frederic Pitout (France) Hervé Lavergne	Polaris	Not held	
2018	Monaco – (Morocco) Nador – (Senegal) Dakar	(France) Jean Hugues Moneyron (France) Thierry Maury	CFMoto	Not held	
2019	Monaco – (Morocco) Nador – (Senegal) Dakar	(France) Rudy Roquesalane (France) Vincent Ferri	Can-Am	Not held	
2020	Monaco – (Morocco) Tangier – (Senegal) Dakar	(France) Benoit Fretin (France) Cédric Duplé	Can-Am	Not held	
2021	Not held due to COVID-19 pandemic			Not held	
2022	Monaco – (Morocco) Nador – (Senegal) Dakar	(France) Jean Dagher-Hayeck (Note: Incorrectly labelled as Senegalese in results.) (France) Patrick Antoniolli	Can-Am	Not held	
2023	Not held due to flooding in Senegal			Not held	
2024	Monaco – (Morocco) Nador – (Senegal) Dakar	(France) Gautier Paulin (France) Remi Boulanger	Apache	Not held	
2025	Monaco – (Morocco) Dakhla – (Senegal) Dakar	(France) Pierre Lafay (France) Gilles De Turckheim	Can-Am	(Belgium) Eric Claeys (Belgium) Tom Claeys	Toyota
2026	(Morocco) Tangier – (Morocco) Dakhla – (Senegal) Dakar	(Netherlands) Martijn Van Den Broek (Netherlands) Mike Daas	Can-Am	(Argentina) Jorge Pérez Companc (Argentina) Ezequiel Pérez Companc	Toyota

== Podiums ==
=== Bikes ===
Year	1st		2nd		3rd	
Year	Rider	Bike	Rider	Bike	Rider	Bike
2009	(Spain) Josè Manuel Pellicer	BMW 450 X	(France) Arnaud Jaquart	KTM	(Germany) Thomas Schattat	Yamaha
2010	(Italy) Marco Capodacqua	KTM	(Italy) Alberto Dottori	KTM	Only two riders classified	
2011	(France) Willy Jobart	KTM Hybrid	(France) Norbert Dubios	KTM	(France) Bruno N'Diaye	KTM
2012	(Italy) Oscar Polli	KTM	(France) Norbert Dubios	KTM	(France) Xavier Moreau	KTM
2013	(Belgium) Martin Fontyn	KTM	(Netherlands) Guillaume Martens	KTM	(France) Patrick Arnoult	Honda
2014	(France) Michael Pisano	Honda	(France) Dominique Robin	KTM	(Belgium) Joris Van Dyck	KTM
2015	(Norway) Pål Anders Ullevålseter	KTM	(Austria) Robert Theuretzbacher	KTM	(Namibia) Ingo Waldschmidt	KTM
2016	(Norway) Pål Anders Ullevålseter	KTM	(United Kingdom) Andrew Newland	KTM	(France) Stéphane Hamard	Husqvarna
2017	(South Africa) Gev Sella	KTM	(Norway) Pål Anders Ullevålseter	KTM	(Slovakia) Martin Benko	KTM
2018	(Italy) Paolo Ceci	KTM	(Portugal) Luis Miguel Anjos Oliveira	Proto	(Portugal) Rui Oliveira	Yamaha
2019	(Italy) Alessandro Botturi	Yamaha	(Norway) Pål Anders Ullevålseter	KTM	(Italy) Simone Agazzi	Honda
2020	(Italy) Alessandro Botturi	Yamaha	(Norway) Pål Anders Ullevålseter	KTM	(United Kingdom) Lyndon Poskitt	KTM
2022	(Slovakia) Stefan Svitko	KTM	(Italy) Maurizio Gerini	Husqvarna	(France) Xavier Flick	Husqvarna
2024	(Italy) Jacopo Cerutti	Aprilia	(Italy) Alessandro Botturi	Yamaha	(Austria) Luca Seppele	Kove
2025	(Italy) Jacopo Cerutti	Aprilia	(Italy) Alessandro Botturi	Yamaha	(France) Guillaume Borne	Husqvarna
2026	(Germany) Kevin Gallas	Yamaha	(France) Paulin Gautier	Yamaha	(France) Jean-Loup Lepan	KTM

=== SSVs ===
Year	1st		2nd		3rd	
Year	Crew	Make	Crew	Make	Crew	Make
2017	(France) Frederic Pitout (France) Hervé Lavergne	Polaris	(France) François Cousin (France) Stephane Cousin	Can-Am	Only two SSV classified	
2018	(France) Jean Hugues Moneyron (France) Thierry Maury	CFMOTO	(France) Loic Bonnevie (France) Sophie Hamys	Can-Am	(France) Vincent Guindani (France) Stephane Nguyen	Can-Am
2019	(France) Rudy Roquesalane (France) Vincent Ferri	Can-Am	(France) Bruno Fretin (France) Willy Charbonnier	Can-Am	(France) Benoit Fretin (France) Anthony Pichard	Can-Am
2020	(France) Benoit Fretin (France) Cédric Duplé	Can-Am	(France) Patrice Etienne (France) Jean Pierre Saint Martin	Can-Am	(France) Loic Frebourg (France) Franck Boulay	Can-Am
2022	(France) Jean Dagher-Hayeck (France) Patrick Antoniolli	Can-Am	(Netherlands) Laurens Meijer (Netherlands) Robbert Visser	Can-Am	(Netherlands) Rudy Vollebregt (Netherlands) Gert Traa	Can-Am
2024	(France) Frederic Henricy (France) Eric Bersey	Polaris	(France) Philippe Champigne (France) Bruno Robin	Can-Am	Only two SSV classified	
2025	(France) Pierre Lafay (France) Gilles De Turckheim	Can-Am	(Netherlands) Martijn Van Den Broek (Netherlands) Jan Paul Van Der Poel	Can-Am	(France) Pierre Lafay (France) Gilles De Turckheim	Can-Am
2026	(Netherlands) Martijn Van Den Broek (Netherlands) Mike Daas	Can-Am	(Slovakia) Martin Benko (Slovakia) Marek Sykora	Taurus	(Netherlands) Sander Derikx (Netherlands) Rob Buursen	Can-Am

=== Cars ===
Year	1st		2nd		3rd	
Year	Crew	Make	Crew	Make	Crew	Make
2009	(France) Jean-Louis Schlesser (France) Arnaud Debron	Schlesser-Renault Buggy	(Russia) Artem Varentsov (Russia) Roman Elagin	Toyota Landcruiser	(Ethiopia) Abdelhamid Abouyoussef (France) Hervé Cotel	Toyota Cotel Buggy
2010	(France) Jean-Louis Schlesser (France) Arnaud Debron	Schlesser-Renault Buggy	(France) Jerome Pelichet (Switzerland) Eugenie Decre	Bowler	(France) Francoi Lethier (Belgium) Jean Marie Lurquin	Buggy
2011	(France) Jean-Louis Schlesser (France) Céline Merle-Beral	Schlesser-Renault Buggy	(Belgium) Stéphane Hernard (Belgium) Francois Beguin	Buggy	(France) Jerome Pelichet (Switzerland) Eugenie Decre	Bowler
2012	(France) Jean-Louis Schlesser (France) Cyril Esquirol	Schlesser-Renault Buggy	(Belgium) Jacques Loomans (Belgium) Frits Driesmans	Toyota	(Tunisia) Salim Kamoun (Tunisia) Sofiane Driss	Toyota
2013	(France) Jean-Louis Schlesser (France) Cyril Esquirol	Schlesser-Renault Buggy	(France) Yves Fromont (France) Jean Fromont	Buggy	(Belgium) Joost Van Cauwenberge (Belgium) Jacques Castelein	Toyota
2014	(France) Jean-Louis Schlesser (France) Thierry Magnaldi	Schlesser-Renault Buggy	(Belgium) Jacques Loomans (Belgium) Frits Driesmans	Toyota	(Belgium) Stéphane Hernard (Belgium) Bruno Barbier	Buggy
2015	(France) Jean Antoine Sabatier (France) Jean-Luc Rojat	Bugga One	(Kazakhstan) Kanat Shagirov (Kazakhstan) Alexandr Moroz	Toyota	(Kazakhstan) Yuriy Sazonov (Kazakhstan) Arsian Sakhimov	Hummer
2016	(Kazakhstan) Kanat Shagirov (Kazakhstan) Vitaliy Yevtyekhov	Toyota	(France) Pascal Thomasse (France) Pascal Larroque	Optimus MD	(France) Mathieu Serradori (France) Didier Haquette	Optimus MD
2017	(Russia) Vladimir Vasiliev (Russia) Konstantin Zhiltsov	Mini	(Czech Republic) Miroslav Zapletal (Czech Republic) Marek Sýkora	Hummer	(France) Dominique Housieaux (France) Cristophe Crespo	Optimus MD
2018	(France) Mathieu Serradori (France) Fabian Lurquin	LCR 30	(Russia) Vladimir Vasiliev (Russia) Konstantin Zhiltsov	Mini	(France) Pascal Thomasse (France) Pascal Larroque	Optimus MD
2019	(France) Jean Pierre Strugo (France) François Borsotto	Optimus MD	(France) David Gerard (France) Pascal Delacour	Optimus MD	(France) Julien Jean Noel (France) Julien Rabha	Optimus MD
2020	(France) Patrick Martin (France) Lucas Martin	Mercedes	(France) Yves Fromont (France) Jean Fromont	VW Tarek Buggy	(Russia) Alexey Titov (Russia) Dmitry Pavlov	Ford Raptor (T2)
2022	(France) Philippe Gosselin (France) Christophe Crespo	Optimus MD	(Hungary) Irme Varga (Hungary) Jozsef Toma	Toyota	(France) David Gerard (France) Pascal Delacour	Optimus MD
2024	(France) Gautier Paulin (France) Remi Boulanger	Apache (T3)	(Belgium) Pascal Feryn (Belgium) Kurt Keysers	Toyota (T1)	(Spain) Carlos Vento (Spain) Carlos Ruiz Moreno	Can-Am (T4)
2025	(France) Benoît Fretin (France) Cédric Duplé	Century CR6	(Poland) Magdalena Zajac (Poland) Blazej Czekan	Toyota	(Netherlands) Wietse Tates (Netherlands) Koen Wessling	Bowler
2026	(France) David Gerard (France) Pascal Delacour	MD Optimus	(Belgium) Christian Femont (Belgium) Gregg Docx	Mini	(Belgium) Vincent Vroninks (Belgium) Dave Berghmans	Red Lined

=== Trucks ===
Year	1st		2nd		3rd	
Year	Crew	Make	Crew	Make	Crew	Make
2009	(Netherlands) Jan de Rooy (Belgium) Dany Colebunders (Poland) Darek Rodewald	Iveco	(Netherlands) Hans Bekx (Belgium) Antoon Maessen (Netherlands) Edwin Willems	DAF	(Hungary) Miklós Kovács (Hungary) Péter Czeglédi (Hungary) Támas Tóth	Scania
2010	(Hungary) Miklós Kovács (Hungary) Peter Czegledi (Hungary) Tomas Toth	Scania	(Belgium) Noel Essers (Belgium) Hans De Pauw (Belgium) Richard Baeten	MAN SE	(France) Stéphane Olivier (France) Xavier Turlais (France) Frederic Vivier	Renault
2011	(Czech Republic) Tomáš Tomeček (Czech Republic) Vojtěch Morávek	Tatra	(Portugal) Elisabete Jacinto (Portugal) Jose Marques (Portugal) Marco Cochinho	MAN SE	(France) Michel Salvatore (France) Raymond Louin	Mercedes-Benz
2012	(Czech Republic) Tomáš Tomeček (Czech Republic) Vojtěch Morávek	Tatra	(Portugal) Elisabete Jacinto (Portugal) Jose Marques (Portugal) Marco Cochinho	MAN SE	(Belgium) Noel Essers (Belgium) Marc Lauwers (Belgium) Peter Belmans	MAN SE
2013	(Russia) Anton Shibalov (Russia) Robert Amatych (Russia) Almaz Khisamiev	Kamaz	(Czech Republic) Tomáš Tomeček (Czech Republic) Vojtěch Morávek	Tatra	(Portugal) Elisabete Jacinto (Portugal) Jose Marques (Portugal) Marco Cochinho	MAN SE
2014	(Czech Republic) Tomáš Tomeček (Czech Republic) Vojtěch Morávek	Tatra	(Hungary) Miklós Kovács (Hungary) Peter Czegledi (Hungary) Laszlo Acs	Scania	(Portugal) Elisabete Jacinto (Portugal) Jose Marques (Portugal) Marco Cochinho	MAN SE
2015	(Russia) Anton Shibalov (Russia) Robert Amatych (Russia) Almaz Khisamiev	Kamaz	(Russia) Sergey Kuprianov (Russia) Alexander Kuprianov (Russia) Anatoly Tanin	Kamaz	(Czech Republic) Tomáš Tomeček (Czech Republic) Ladislav Lála	Tatra
2016	(Russia) Anton Shibalov (Russia) Robert Amatych (Russia) Almaz Khisamiev	Kamaz	(Czech Republic) Tomáš Tomeček (Czech Republic) Ladislav Lála	Tatra	(Portugal) Elisabete Jacinto (Portugal) Jose Marques (Portugal) Marco Cochinho	MAN SE
2017	(Russia) Andrey Karginov (Russia) Andrey Mokeev (Russia) Dmitrii Nikitin	Kamaz	(Czech Republic) Jaroslav Valtr (Czech Republic) Rostislav Pilný (Czech Republic) Filip Škrobánek	Tatra	(Czech Republic) Tomáš Tomeček (Czech Republic) Ladislav Lála	Tatra
2018	(Netherlands) Gérard de Rooy (Poland) Darek Rodewald (Spain) Moi Torrellardona	Iveco	(Czech Republic) Tomáš Tomeček	Tatra	(Netherlands) Johannes Van De Laar (Netherlands) Ben Van De Laar (Netherlands) Adolphus Huijgens	DAF
2019	(Portugal) Elisabete Jacinto (Portugal) Jose Marques (Portugal) Marco Cochinho	MAN SE	(Belgium) Noel Essers (Belgium) Marc Lauwers (Belgium) Johan Cooninx	MAN SE	(Netherlands) Johan Elfrink (Netherlands) Dirk Schuttel	Mercedes-Benz
2020	(Hungary) Miklós Kovács (Hungary) Peter Czegledi (Hungary) Laszlo Acs	Scania	(Hungary) Karoly Farekas (Hungary) Albert Horn (Hungary) Peter Csakany	Scania	(Czech Republic) Tomáš Tomeček	Tatra
2022	(Czech Republic) Tomáš Tomeček	Tatra	(Italy) Giulio Verzeletti (Italy) Giuseppe Fortuna	Mercedes-Benz	Only two trucks classified	
2024	(Czech Republic) Tomáš Tomeček	Tatra	(Netherlands) Aad Van Velsen (Netherlands) Michel Van Velsen (Netherlands) Marco Siemons	Scania	(Belgium) Cedric Feryn (Belgium) Bjorn Burgelman (Belgium) Tom De Leeuw	GINAF
2025	(Netherlands) Gerrit Zuurmond (Netherlands) Tjeerd Van Ballegooij (Netherlands) Klaas Kwakkel	MAN SE	(Netherlands) William Van Groningen (Netherlands) Wesley Van Groningen (Netherlands) Raph Van Den Elshout	Iveco	Only two trucks entered	
2026	(Netherlands) Gerrit Zuurmond (Netherlands) Tjeerd Van Ballegooij (Netherlands) Klaas Kwakkel	MAN	(Netherlands) Martin Roeterdink (Netherlands) Roy Korenromp (Netherlands) Geralt Van Blik	DAF	(Netherlands) Mike Panhuijzen (Netherlands) Pieter Kuypers (Netherlands) Eric Jan Hartjes	MAN

=== Historic ===
Year	1st		2nd		3rd	
Year	Crew	Make	Crew	Make	Crew	Make
2025	(Belgium) Eric Claeys (Belgium) Tom Claeys	Toyota	(Belgium) Kurt Dujardyn (Belgium) Rene Declercq	Bombardier	(France) Fabrice Morin (France) Magalie Morin	Toyota
2026	(Argentina) Jorge Pérez Companc (Argentina) Ezequiel Pérez Companc	Toyota	(Belgium) Dirk Van Rompuy (Spain) Jan Rosa	Toyota	(France) Pierre Bourdeau (France) Bruno Domy	Toyota

== Records ==
=== Bike ===
Rank	Name	Victories	Editions
1	(Norway) Pal Anders Ullevalseter	2	2015, 2016
1	(Italy) Alessandro Botturi	2	2019, 2020
1	(Italy) Jacopo Cerutti	2	2024, 2025
2	(Spain) José Manuel Pellicer	1	2009
2	(Italy) Marco Capodacqua	1	2010
2	(France) Willy Jobard	1	2011
2	(Italy) Oscar Polli	1	2012
2	(Belgium) Martin Fontyn	1	2013
2	(France) Michael Pisano	1	2014
2	(South Africa) Gev Teddy Sella	1	2017
2	(Italy) Paolo Ceci	1	2018
2	(Slovakia) Štefan Svitko	1	2022
2	(Germany) Kevin Gallas	1	2026

=== SSV ===
Rank	Name	Victories	Editions
1	(France) Frederic Pitout	1	2017
1	(France) Jean Hugues Moneyron	1	2018
1	(France) Rudy Roquesalane	1	2019
1	(France) Benoit Fretin	1	2020
1	(France) Jean Dagher-Hayeck	1	2022
1	(France) Gautier Paulin	1	2024
1	(France) Pierre Lafay	1	2025
1	(Netherlands) Martijn Van Den Broek	1	2026

=== Car ===
Rank	Name	Victories	Editions
1	(France) Jean-Louis Schlesser	6	2009, 2010, 2011, 2012, 2013, 2014
2	(France) Jean-Antoine Sabatier	1	2015
2	(Kazakhstan) Kanat Shagirov	1	2016
2	(Russia) Vladimir Vasilyev	1	2017
2	(France) Mathieu Serradori	1	2018
2	(France) Jean Pierre Strugo	1	2019
2	(France) Patrick Martin	1	2020
2	(France) Philippe Gosselin	1	2022
2	(France) Gautier Paulin	1	2024
2	(France) Benoit Fretin	1	2025

=== Truck ===
Rank	Name	Victories	Editions
1	(Czech Republic) Tomáš Tomeček	5	2011, 2012, 2014, 2022, 2024
1	(Russia) Anton Shibalov	3	2013, 2015, 2016
2	(Hungary) Miklós Kovács	2	2010, 2020
2	(Netherlands) Gerrit Zuurmond	2	2025, 2026
3	(Netherlands) Jan de Rooy	1	2009
3	(Russia) Andrey Karginov	1	2017
3	(Netherlands) Gerard de Rooy	1	2018
3	(Portugal) Elisabete Jacinto	1	2019

=== Historic ===
Rank	Name	Victories	Editions
1	(Belgium) Eric Claeys	1	2025
1	(Argentina) Jorge Pérez Companc	1	2026

== See also ==
- Budapest-Bamako – Desert rally
- Dakar Rally
- Rallye des Pharaons
