= Pål Anders Ullevålseter =

Norwegian rally raid motorcycle rider (born 1968)

Pål Anders Ullevålseter (born 7 December 1968, in Oslo) is a Norwegian rally raid motorcycle rider.

Ullevålseter came in second at the 2010 Dakar Rally, captured the 2004 FIM Cross-Country Rallies World Championship and has won the Africa Eco Race twice.

== Dakar Rally ==
Ullevålseter has competed in the Dakar Rally 11 times and was the first Norwegian to complete the race. His best result came in 2010 when he came in second, finishing just over an hour behind winner Cyril Despres.

Year	Class	Vehicle	Position	Stages won
2002	Motorbike	(Austria) KTM	9th	0
2003	Motorbike	(Austria) KTM	7th	0
2004	Motorbike	(Austria) KTM	5th	0
2005	Motorbike	(Austria) KTM	DNF	0
2006	Motorbike	(Austria) KTM	6th	0
2007	Motorbike	(Austria) KTM	4th	0
2008	Event cancelled – replaced by the 2008 Central Europe Rally			
2009	Motorbike	(Austria) KTM	6th	0
2010	Motorbike	(Austria) KTM	2nd	1
2011	Motorbike	(Austria) KTM	6th	0
2012	Motorbike	(Austria) KTM	6th	1
2013	Motorbike	(Austria) KTM	16th	0
2014	Motorbike	(Austria) KTM	DNF	0

== Africa Eco Race ==
Ullevålseter won the Africa Eco Race in 2015 and 2016, dominating completely the races, and winning 16 stages. Prior to the 2016 edition, Ullevålseter had stated, his goal was not to win the race, but to raise as much money as possible for a school in Dakar, founded by Fabrizio Meoni, who died during the Dakar Rallye in 2005. In 2017, Ullevålseter finished second overall behind South African Gev Sella.

Year	Class	Vehicle	Position	Stages won
2015	Motorbike	(Austria) KTM	1st	7
2016	Motorbike	(Austria) KTM	1st	9
2017	Motorbike	(Austria) KTM	2nd	?
2018	Motorbike	(Austria) KTM	DNF	?
2019	Motorbike	(Austria) KTM	2nd	2
2020	Motorbike	(Austria) KTM	2nd	1
2022	Motorbike	(Austria) KTM	4th	0

== FIM Cross-Country Rallies World Championship ==
In 2004, Ullevålseter won the FIM Cross-Country Rallies World Championship. He took the third place in 2006 and captured silver in 2007.

== Other accomplishments ==
Ullevålseter won the Rallye des Pharaons in 2004 and claimed victory at the Merzouga Rally in 2014.

== Personal ==
Ullevålseter announced his engagement with former kickboxing world champion Mette Solli in May 2015.

A celebrity in Norway, Ullevålseter won the 2007 season of "Isdans", the Norwegian equivalent of Dancing on Ice, alongside Anna Pushkova. In 2013, he competed in "Skal vi danse", the Norwegian version of Dancing With The Stars.
