= 2016 Africa Eco Race =

Part of the Africa Eco Race
← Previous event	Next event →
- Host country: Monaco, Morocco, Mauritania and Senegal
- Dates run: 27 December 2015–10 January 2016
- Start: Monaco
- Finish: (Senegal) Dakar
- Stages: 12
- Stage surface: Gravel, sand
- Overall distance: 5,978.00 km (3,714.56 mi)

Results
- Bikes winner: (Norway) Paul Ullevalseter; KTM
- Cars winner: (Kazakhstan) Kanat Shagirov (Kazakhstan) Vitaliy Yevtyekhov; Toyota Hilux Overdrive
- Trucks winner: (Russia) Anton Shibalov (Russia) Robert Amatych (Russia) Almaz Khisamiev (Russia) Kamaz
- Crews: 69 at start, 59 at finish

The 2016 Africa Eco Race was the 8th edition of the rally-raid which replaced the Dakar Rally after its departure to South-America.

Paul Ullevalseter (with KTM, won 9 of the 11 contested stages) and Anton Shibalov (with Kamaz, won 7 of the 12 stages), like in 2015, dominated completely the race in bikes and trucks categories, while Kanat Shagirov took the race lead yet in Morocco and keep it to the end.

== Stages ==
Stage	Date	Start	Finish	Connection	Special	Connection	Total	Bikes	Cars	Trucks
1	29-Dec	(Morocco) Nador	(Morocco) Jorf El Hamam	50 km	~~100~~ 47 km (Note: Due to the late arrival of transporting boat between France and Morocco, the 1st stage was reduced to 47 km for cars and trucks and was cancelled for bikes.)	463 km	613 km	cancelled	(Kazakhstan) Y. Sazonov	(Russia) S. Kuprianov
2	30-Dec	(Morocco) Jorf El Hamam	(Morocco) Tagounite	75 km	313 km	15 km	403 km	(Norway) P. Ullevalseter	(France) M. Serradori	(Russia) A. Shibalov
3	31-Dec	(Morocco) Tagounite	(Morocco) Assa	15 km	451 km	92 km	558 km	(Norway) P. Ullevalseter	(Kazakhstan) Y. Sazonov	(Russia) A. Shibalov
4	1-Jan	(Morocco) Assa	(Morocco) Remz el Quebir	0 km	409 km	0 km	409 km	(Norway) P. Ullevalseter	(France) J. Sabatier	(Russia) A. Shibalov
5	2-Jan	(Morocco) Remz el Quebir	(Morocco) Dakhla	0 km	453 km	242 km	695 km	(Norway) P. Ullevalseter	(Kazakhstan) K. Shagirov	(Russia) A. Shibalov
3-Jan		Rest day in (Morocco) Dakhla								
6	4-Jan	(Morocco) Dakhla	(Mauritania) Chami	438 km	174 km	5 km	617 km	(Norway) P. Ullevalseter	(France) D. Housieaux	(Russia) S. Kuprianov
7	5-Jan	(Mauritania) Chami	(Mauritania) Amodjar	0 km	414 km	30 km	444 km	(United Kingdom) A. Newland	(Kazakhstan) K. Shagirov	(Russia) A. Shibalov
8	6-Jan	(Mauritania) Amodjar	(Mauritania) Amodjar	79 km	377 km	42 km	498 km	(Norway) P. Ullevalseter	(France) M. Serradori	(Russia) A. Shibalov
9	7-Jan	(Mauritania) Amodjar	(Mauritania) Akjoujt	23 km	445 km	25 km	493 km	(Norway) P. Ullevalseter	(France) J. Sabatier	(Czech Republic) T. Tomecek
10	8-Jan	(Mauritania) Akjoujt	(Mauritania) Akjoujt	0 km	379 km	24 km	403 km	(Norway) P. Ullevalseter	(France) D. Gerard	(Czech Republic) T. Tomecek
11	9-Jan	(Mauritania) Akjoujt	(Senegal) Saint-Louis	0 km	208 km	340 km	548 km	(Russia) D. Agoshkov	(France) M. Serradori	(Russia) S. Kuprianov
12	10-Jan	(Senegal) Saint-Louis	(Senegal) Dakar	230 km	24 km (Note: The stage time is not taken account in Overall classification)	41 km	295 km	(Norway) P. Ullevalseter	(France) P. Gosselin	(Russia) A. Shibalov

== Summary ==
=== Bikes ===
The race was marked by high hardness on the stages of the great soft dunes in Mauritania which caused major changes in the overall classification, particularly in stages 9 and 10. As in 2015, Pål Ullevalseter completely dominated the race, finishing with a lead over 6 hours, being followed by the amazing Andrew Newland, a civil-contraceur. Anastasiya Nifontova has always been in the podium places until she had an accident in stage 9. The Portuguese Jose Fernando Moreira de Sousa (father) and José Fernando de Jesus Sousa Jr. (son) worked as a team and achieved five podiums and finished 7th and 8th respectively .

=== Cars ===
The Kazakh driver Sazonov dominated the start of the competition with his Hummer until he had an accident during 4th stage, giving way to his compatriot Shagirov in Toyota Hilux Overdrive, which managed to keep the lead until the end, despite the attacks of buggys, more effective in the dunes which ended in the following positions. The last year's winner Jean Antoine Sabatier was only 4th place. Sazonov was 7 between the cars and the 2nd best 4WD. Ricardo Leal dos Santos started the race with a 3rd place, but soon had mechanical problems finishing only 12th in cars, 3rd among the 4WD.

=== Trucks ===
In trucks category, complete domination by Kamaz and defending champion Anton Shibalov, only interrupted by Tomas Tomecek in stages 9 and 10 (when Kamaz faced problems), despite the problems he had in the 4th stage (2 flat tyres and broken shock-absorber) and early loss of his assistance truck due to mechanical issues. A breakdown in the 2nd Kamaz of Kuprianov would put him out of the podium completed by Elisabete Jacinto making of regularity her main weapon.

== Stage results ==
=== Bikes ===
	Stage result					General classification				
Stage	Pos	Competitor	Make	Time	Gap	Pos	Competitor	Make	Time	Gap
1	Stage cancelled due to delay in ferry-boat.									
2	1	(Norway) Pål Ullevålseter	KTM	04:21:29		1	(Norway) Pål Ullevålseter	KTM	04:21:29	
2	2	(Italy) Stefano Chiussi	Husqvarna	04:45:26	23:57	2	(Italy) Stefano Chiussi	Husqvarna	04:45:26	00:23:57
2	3	(United Kingdom) Andrew Newland	KTM	04:45:56	24:27	3	(United Kingdom) Andrew Newland	KTM	04:45:56	00:24:27
3	1	(Norway) Pål Ullevålseter	KTM	06:16:28		1	(Norway) Pål Ullevålseter	KTM	10:37:57	
3	2	(Russia) Anastasiya Nifontova	Husqvarna	06:29:17	12:49	2	(United Kingdom) Andrew Newland	KTM	11:30:33	00:52:36
3	3	(United Kingdom) Andrew Newland	KTM	06:44:37	28:09	3	(Russia) Dmitry Agoshkov	KTM	11:33:48	00:55:51
4	1	(Norway) Pål Ullevålseter	KTM	05:32:01		1	(Norway) Pål Ullevålseter	KTM	16:09:58	
4	2	(France) Norbert Dubois	KTM	05:46:20	14:19	2	(United Kingdom) Andrew Newland	KTM	17:21:48	01:11:50
4	3	(United Kingdom) Andrew Newland	KTM	05:51:15	19:14	3	(Russia) Anastasiya Nifontova	Husqvarna	17:27:23	01:17:25
5	1	(Norway) Pål Ullevålseter	KTM	05:18:27		1	(Norway) Pål Ullevålseter	KTM	21:28:25	
5	2	(Portugal) José Sousa Sr.	KTM	06:00:29	42:02	2	(Russia) Anastasiya Nifontova	Husqvarna	23:44:07	02:15:42
5	3	(Kazakhstan) Yevgeniya Nesterova	Husqvarna	06:00:35	42:08	3	(Russia) Dmitry Agoshkov	KTM	23:47:28	02:19:03
6	1	(Norway) Pål Ullevålseter	KTM	01:29:02		1	(Norway) Pål Ullevålseter	KTM	22:57:27	
6	2	(France) Norbert Dubois	KTM	01:35:37	06:35	2	(Russia) Anastasiya Nifontova	Husqvarna	25:25:15	02:27:48
6	3	(Russia) Dmitry Agoshkov	KTM	01:39:00	09:58	3	(Russia) Dmitry Agoshkov	KTM	25:26:28	02:29:01
7	1	(United Kingdom) Andrew Newland	KTM	05:30:36		1	(Norway) Pål Ullevålseter	KTM	28:31:18	
7	2	(France) Norbert Dubois	KTM	05:33:21	02:45	2	(Russia) Anastasiya Nifontova	Husqvarna	31:09:21	02:38:03
7	3	(Norway) Pål Ullevålseter	KTM	05:33:51	03:15	3	(Russia) Dmitry Agoshkov	KTM	31:22:34	02:51:16
8	1	(Norway) Pål Ullevålseter	KTM	06:29:10		1	(Norway) Pål Ullevålseter	KTM	35:00:28	
8	2	(United Kingdom) Andrew Newland	KTM	06:57:49	28:39	2	(France) Norbert Dubois	Husqvarna	38:56:38	03:56:10
8	3	(Portugal) José Sousa Jr.	KTM	07:01:18	32:08	3	(Russia) Anastasiya Nifontova	Husqvarna	39:13:00	04:12:32
9	1	(Norway) Pål Ullevålseter	KTM	06:11:07		1	(Norway) Pål Ullevålseter	KTM	41:11:35	
9	2	(Portugal) José Sousa Sr.	KTM	06:23:18	12:11	2	(Russia) Dmitry Agoshkov	KTM	46:33:04	05:21:29
9	3	(Portugal) José Sousa Jr.	KTM	06:25:17	14:10	3	(United Kingdom) Andrew Newland	KTM	46:53:07	05:41:32
10	1	(Norway) Pål Ullevålseter	KTM	05:04:41		1	(Norway) Pål Ullevålseter	KTM	46:16:16	
10	2	(United Kingdom) Andrew Newland	KTM	05:20:23	15:42	2	(United Kingdom) Andrew Newland	KTM	52:13:30	05:57:14
10	3	(Portugal) José Sousa Jr.	KTM	05:41:46	37:05	3	(France) Stephane Hamard	Husqvarna	52:49:15	06:32:59
11	1	(Russia) Dmitry Agoshkov	KTM	01:50:36		1	(Norway) Pål Ullevålseter	KTM	48:12:13	
11	2	(France) Stephane Hamard	Husqvarna	01:52:35	01:59	2	(United Kingdom) Andrew Newland	KTM	54:14:53	06:02:40
11	3	(Norway) Pål Ullevålseter	KTM	01:55:57	05:21	3	(France) Stephane Hamard	Husqvarna	54:41:50	06:29:37
12	1	(Norway) Pål Ullevålseter	KTM	00:11:00		1	(Norway) Pål Ullevålseter	KTM	48:12:13	
12	2	(France) Julien Sanchez	Yamaha	00:11:41	00:41	2	(United Kingdom) Andrew Newland	KTM	54:14:53	06:02:40
12	3	(France) Norbert Dubois	KTM	12:12	01:12	3	(France) Stephane Hamard	Husqvarna	54:41:50	06:29:37

=== Cars ===
	Stage result					General classification				
Stage	Pos	Competitor	Make	Time	Gap	Pos	Competitor	Make	Time	Gap
1	1	(Kazakhstan) Yuriy Sazonov (Kazakhstan) Arslan Shakhimov	H3	00:37:25		1	(Kazakhstan) Yuriy Sazonov (Kazakhstan) Arslan Shakhimov	H3	00:37:25	
1	2	(Kazakhstan) Kanat Shagirov (Kazakhstan) Vitaliy Yevtyekhov	Toyota Overdrive	00:40:17	02:52	2	(Kazakhstan) Kanat Shagirov (Kazakhstan) Vitaliy Yevtyekhov	Toyota Overdrive	00:40:17	00:02:52
1	3	(Portugal) R. Leal dos Santos (Brazil) Mykel Justo	Nissan Navara	00:40:27	03:02	3	(Portugal) R. Leal dos Santos (Brazil) Mykel Justo	Nissan Navara	00:40:27	00:03:02
2	1	(France) Mathieu Serradori (France) Didier Haquette	Proto	03:31:14		1	(Kazakhstan) Yuriy Sazonov (Kazakhstan) Arslan Shakhimov	H3	04:10:07	
2	2	(Kazakhstan) Yuriy Sazonov (Kazakhstan) Arslan Shakhimov	H3	03:32:42	01:28	2	(France) Mathieu Serradori (France) Didier Haquette	Proto	04:14:43	00:04:36
2	3	(Russia) Anton Grigorov (Russia) Roman Elagin	OSC	03:36:54	05:40	3	(Russia) Anton Grigorov (Russia) Roman Elagin	OSC	04:18:58	00:08:51
3	1	(Kazakhstan) Yuriy Sazonov (Kazakhstan) Arslan Shakhimov	H3	05:06:24		1	(Kazakhstan) Yuriy Sazonov (Kazakhstan) Arslan Shakhimov	H3	09:16:31	
3	2	(France) Pascal Thomasse (France) Pascal Larroque	Optimus MD	05:09:25	03:01	2	(France) Mathieu Serradori (France) Didier Haquette	Proto	09:43:53	00:27:22
3	3	(Kazakhstan) Kanat Shagirov (Kazakhstan) Vitaliy Yevtyekhov	Toyota Overdrive	05:10:40	04:16	3	(Kazakhstan) Kanat Shagirov (Kazakhstan) Vitaliy Yevtyekhov	Toyota Overdrive	09:45:39	00:29:08
4	1	(France) Jean Antoine Sabatier (Italy) Agostino Rizzardi	Bugga One	04:44:33		1	(Kazakhstan) Kanat Shagirov (Kazakhstan) Vitaliy Yevtyekhov	Toyota Overdrive	14:33:54	
4	2	(France) Pascal Thomasse (France) Pascal Larroque	Optimus MD	04:46:59	02:26	2	(France) Pascal Thomasse (France) Pascal Larroque	Optimus MD	14:42:38	00:08:44
4	3	(Kazakhstan) Kanat Shagirov (Kazakhstan) Vitaliy Yevtyekhov	Toyota Overdrive	04:48:15	03:42	3	(France) Jean Antoine Sabatier (Italy) Agostino Rizzardi	Bugga One	15:03:26	00:29:32
5	1	(Kazakhstan) Kanat Shagirov (Kazakhstan) Vitaliy Yevtyekhov	Toyota Overdrive	03:59:14		1	(Kazakhstan) Kanat Shagirov (Kazakhstan) Vitaliy Yevtyekhov	Toyota Overdrive	18:33:08	
5	2	(Russia) Anton Grigorov (Russia) Roman Elagin	OSC	04:00:54	01:40	2	(France) Pascal Thomasse (France) Pascal Larroque	Optimus MD	19:00:51	00:27:43
5	3	(France) Mathieu Serradori (France) Didier Haquette	Proto	04:04:02	04:48	3	(France) Mathieu Serradori (France) Didier Haquette	Proto	19:14:26	00:41:18
6	1	(France) Dominique Housieaux (France) Loic Fagot	Optimus MD	01:15:44		1	(Kazakhstan) Kanat Shagirov (Kazakhstan) Vitaliy Yevtyekhov	Toyota Overdrive	19:50:21	
6	2	(Kazakhstan) Kanat Shagirov (Kazakhstan) Vitaliy Yevtyekhov	Toyota Overdrive	01:17:13	01:29	2	(France) Pascal Thomasse (France) Pascal Larroque	Optimus MD	20:19:00	00:28:39
6	3	(France) Pascal Thomasse (France) Pascal Larroque	Optimus MD	01:18:09	02:25	3	(France) Mathieu Serradori (France) Didier Haquette	Proto	20:41:35	00:51:14
7	1	(Kazakhstan) Kanat Shagirov (Kazakhstan) Vitaliy Yevtyekhov	Toyota Overdrive	04:30:22		1	(Kazakhstan) Kanat Shagirov (Kazakhstan) Vitaliy Yevtyekhov	Toyota Overdrive	24:20:43	
7	2	(France) Jeremie Choiseau (France) Jean Brucy	Optimus MD	04:47:58	17:36	2	(France) Pascal Thomasse (France) Pascal Larroque	Optimus MD	25:14:50	00:54:07
7	3	(Russia) Anton Grigorov (Russia) Roman Elagin	OSC	04:49:54	19:32	3	(France) Mathieu Serradori (France) Didier Haquette	Proto	25:45:59	01:25:16
8	1	(France) Mathieu Serradori (France) Didier Haquette	Proto	06:03:09		1	(Kazakhstan) Kanat Shagirov (Kazakhstan) Vitaliy Yevtyekhov	Toyota Overdrive	30:33:06	
8	2	(France) Pascal Thomasse (France) Pascal Larroque	Optimus MD	06:06:20	03:11	2	(France) Pascal Thomasse (France) Pascal Larroque	Optimus MD	31:22:15	00:49:09
8	3	(Kazakhstan) Kanat Shagirov (Kazakhstan) Vitaliy Yevtyekhov	Toyota Overdrive	06:12:23	09:14	3	(France) Mathieu Serradori (France) Didier Haquette	Proto	31:49:08	01:16:02
9	1	(France) Jean Antoine Sabatier (Italy) Agostino Rizzardi	Bugga One	05:19:41		1	(Kazakhstan) Kanat Shagirov (Kazakhstan) Vitaliy Yevtyekhov	Toyota Overdrive	36:48:32	
9	2	(France) Patrick Martin (France) Didier Bigot	Volkswagen Buggy	05:27:58	08:17	2	(France) Pascal Thomasse (France) Pascal Larroque	Optimus MD	36:57:09	00:08:37
9	3	(France) Jean Pierre Strugo (France) Christophe Crespo	Optimus MD	05:31:12	11:31	3	(France) Mathieu Serradori (France) Didier Haquette	Proto	38:08:50	01:20:18
10	1	(France) David Gerard (France) Gerard Dubuy	Optimus MD	04:35:52		1	(Kazakhstan) Kanat Shagirov (Kazakhstan) Vitaliy Yevtyekhov	Toyota Overdrive	41:35:41	
10	2	(France) Guillaume Gomez (France) Herve Lavergne	Optimus MD	04:42:19	06:27	2	(France) Pascal Thomasse (France) Pascal Larroque	Optimus MD	42:02:24	00:26:43
10	3	(France) Patrick Martin (France) Didier Bigot	Volkswagen Buggy	04:43:24	07:32	3	(France) Jean Antoine Sabatier (Italy) Agostino Rizzardi	Bugga One	43:17:09	01:41:28
11	1	(France) Mathieu Serradori (France) Didier Haquette	Proto	01:26:49		1	(Kazakhstan) Kanat Shagirov (Kazakhstan) Vitaliy Yevtyekhov	Toyota Overdrive	43:11:50	
11	2	(France) Jeremie Choiseau (France) Jean Brucy	Optimus MD	01:33:06	06:17	2	(France) Pascal Thomasse (France) Pascal Larroque	Optimus MD	43:36:38	00:24:48
11	3	(France) Patrick Martin (France) Didier Bigot	Volkswagen Buggy	01:34:14	07:25	3	(France) Mathieu Serradori (France) Didier Haquette	Proto	44:45:13	01:33:23
12	1	(France) Philippe Gosselin (France) Pascal Vincent	Optimus MD	00:11:51		1	(Kazakhstan) Kanat Shagirov (Kazakhstan) Vitaliy Yevtyekhov	Toyota Overdrive	43:11:50	
12	2	(Hungary) Balazs Szalay (Hungary) Laszlo Bunkoczi	Opel	00:12:16	00:25	2	(France) Pascal Thomasse (France) Pascal Larroque	Optimus MD	43:36:38	00:24:48
12	3	(Portugal) R. Leal dos Santos (Brazil) Mykel Justo	Nissan Navara	00:12:45	00:54	3	(France) Mathieu Serradori (France) Didier Haquette	Proto	44:45:13	01:33:23

=== Trucks ===
	Stage result					General classification				
Stage	Pos	Competitor	Make	Time	Gap	Pos	Competitor	Make	Time	Gap
1	1	(Russia) Sergey Kuprianov (Russia) Alexander Kuprianov (Russia) Anatoly Tanin	Kamaz	00:42:17		1	(Russia) Sergey Kuprianov (Russia) Alexander Kuprianov (Russia) Anatoly Tanin	Kamaz	00:42:17	
1	2	(Russia) Anton Shibalov (Russia) Robert Amatych (Russia) Almaz Khisamiev	Kamaz	00:43:21	01:04	2	(Russia) Anton Shibalov (Russia) Robert Amatych (Russia) Almaz Khisamiev	Kamaz	00:43:21	00;01:04
1	3	(Hungary) Miklos Kovacs (Hungary) Peter Czegledi (Hungary) Laszlo Acs	Scania	00:43:48	01:31	3	(Hungary) Miklos Kovacs (Hungary) Peter Czegledi (Hungary) Laszlo Acs	Scania	00:43:48	00:01:31
2	1	(Russia) Anton Shibalov (Russia) Robert Amatych (Russia) Almaz Khisamiev	Kamaz	03:32:31		1	(Russia) Anton Shibalov (Russia) Robert Amatych (Russia) Almaz Khisamiev	Kamaz	04:15:52	
2	2	(Russia) Sergey Kuprianov (Russia) Alexander Kuprianov (Russia) Anatoly Tanin	Kamaz	03:46:40	14:09	2	(Russia) Sergey Kuprianov (Russia) Alexander Kuprianov (Russia) Anatoly Tanin	Kamaz	04:28:57	00:13:05
2	3	(Czech Republic) Tomas Tomecek (Czech Republic) Ladislav Lala	Tatra	04:09:26	36:55	3	(Czech Republic) Tomas Tomecek (Czech Republic) Ladislav Lala	Tatra	04:54:44	00:38:52
3	1	(Russia) Anton Shibalov (Russia) Robert Amatych (Russia) Almaz Khisamiev	Kamaz	05:11:29		1	(Russia) Anton Shibalov (Russia) Robert Amatych (Russia) Almaz Khisamiev	Kamaz	09:27:21	
3	2	(Russia) Sergey Kuprianov (Russia) Alexander Kuprianov (Russia) Anatoly Tanin	Kamaz	05:18:19	06:50	2	(Russia) Sergey Kuprianov (Russia) Alexander Kuprianov (Russia) Anatoly Tanin	Kamaz	09:47:16	19:55
3	3	(Czech Republic) Tomas Tomecek (Czech Republic) Ladislav Lala	Tatra	05:56:12	44:43	3	(Czech Republic) Tomas Tomecek (Czech Republic) Ladislav Lala	Tatra	10:50:56	01:23:35
4	1	(Russia) Anton Shibalov (Russia) Robert Amatych (Russia) Almaz Khisamiev	Kamaz	04:49:30		1	(Russia) Anton Shibalov (Russia) Robert Amatych (Russia) Almaz Khisamiev	Kamaz	14:16:51	
4	2	(Portugal) Elisabete Jacinto (Portugal) José Marques (Portugal) Marco Cochinho	MAN	05:00:02	10:32	2	(Russia) Sergey Kuprianov (Russia) Alexander Kuprianov (Russia) Anatoly Tanin	Kamaz	15:17:48	01:00:57
4	3	(Russia) Sergey Kuprianov (Russia) Alexander Kuprianov (Russia) Anatoly Tanin	Kamaz	05:30:32	41:02	3	(Portugal) Elisabete Jacinto (Portugal) José Marques (Portugal) Marco Cochinho	MAN	16:16:25	01:59:34
5	1	(Russia) Anton Shibalov (Russia) Robert Amatych (Russia) Almaz Khisamiev	Kamaz	04:30:27		1	(Russia) Anton Shibalov (Russia) Robert Amatych (Russia) Almaz Khisamiev	Kamaz	18:47:18	
5	2	(Russia) Sergey Kuprianov (Russia) Alexander Kuprianov (Russia) Anatoly Tanin	Kamaz	04:31:56	01:29	2	(Russia) Sergey Kuprianov (Russia) Alexander Kuprianov (Russia) Anatoly Tanin	Kamaz	19:49:44	01:02:26
5	3	(Czech Republic) Tomas Tomecek (Czech Republic) Ladislav Lala	Tatra	04:38:58	08:31	3	(Portugal) Elisabete Jacinto (Portugal) José Marques (Portugal) Marco Cochinho	MAN	20:59:38	02:12:20
6	1	(Russia) Sergey Kuprianov (Russia) Alexander Kuprianov (Russia) Anatoly Tanin	Kamaz	01:22:41		1	(Russia) Anton Shibalov (Russia) Robert Amatych (Russia) Almaz Khisamiev	Kamaz	20:10:39	
6	2	(Russia) Anton Shibalov (Russia) Robert Amatych (Russia) Almaz Khisamiev	Kamaz	01:23:21	00:40	2	(Russia) Sergey Kuprianov (Russia) Alexander Kuprianov (Russia) Anatoly Tanin	Kamaz	21:12:25	01:01:46
6	3	(Czech Republic) Tomas Tomecek (Czech Republic) Ladislav Lala	Tatra	01:30:10	07:29	3	(Portugal) Elisabete Jacinto (Portugal) José Marques (Portugal) Marco Cochinho	MAN	22:33:35	02:22:56
7	1	(Russia) Anton Shibalov (Russia) Robert Amatych (Russia) Almaz Khisamiev	Kamaz	05:04:11		1	(Russia) Anton Shibalov (Russia) Robert Amatych (Russia) Almaz Khisamiev	Kamaz	25:14:50	
7	2	(Russia) Sergey Kuprianov (Russia) Alexander Kuprianov (Russia) Anatoly Tanin	Kamaz	05:04:45	00:34	2	(Russia) Sergey Kuprianov (Russia) Alexander Kuprianov (Russia) Anatoly Tanin	Kamaz	26:17:10	01:02:20
7	3	(Czech Republic) Tomas Tomecek (Czech Republic) Ladislav Lala	Tatra	05:14:09	09:58	3	(Portugal) Elisabete Jacinto (Portugal) José Marques (Portugal) Marco Cochinho	MAN	28:26:20	03:11:30
8	1	(Russia) Anton Shibalov (Russia) Robert Amatych (Russia) Almaz Khisamiev	Kamaz	06:20:51		1	(Russia) Anton Shibalov (Russia) Robert Amatych (Russia) Almaz Khisamiev	Kamaz	31:35:41	
8	2	(Czech Republic) Tomas Tomecek (Czech Republic) Ladislav Lala	Tatra	06:31:10	10:19	2	(Russia) Sergey Kuprianov (Russia) Alexander Kuprianov (Russia) Anatoly Tanin	Kamaz	32:51:42	01:16:01
8	3	(Portugal) Elisabete Jacinto (Portugal) José Marques (Portugal) Marco Cochinho	MAN	06:33:55	13:04	3	(Portugal) Elisabete Jacinto (Portugal) José Marques (Portugal) Marco Cochinho	MAN	35:00:15	03:24:34
9	1	(Czech Republic) Tomas Tomecek (Czech Republic) Ladislav Lala	Tatra	06:22:30		1	(Russia) Anton Shibalov (Russia) Robert Amatych (Russia) Almaz Khisamiev	Kamaz	39:35:44	
9	2	(Portugal) Elisabete Jacinto (Portugal) José Marques (Portugal) Marco Cochinho	MAN	07:16:47	00:54:17	2	(Russia) Sergey Kuprianov (Russia) Alexander Kuprianov (Russia) Anatoly Tanin	Kamaz	40:42:12	01:06:28
9	3	(Russia) Sergey Kuprianov (Russia) Alexander Kuprianov (Russia) Anatoly Tanin	Kamaz	07:50:30	01:28:00	3	(Portugal) Elisabete Jacinto (Portugal) José Marques (Portugal) Marco Cochinho	MAN	42:17:02	02:41:18
10	1	(Czech Republic) Tomas Tomecek (Czech Republic) Ladislav Lala	Tatra	05:17:29		1	(Russia) Anton Shibalov (Russia) Robert Amatych (Russia) Almaz Khisamiev	Kamaz	45:38:02	
10	2	(Russia) Anton Shibalov (Russia) Robert Amatych (Russia) Almaz Khisamiev	Kamaz	06:02:18	00:44:49	2	(Czech Republic) Tomas Tomecek (Czech Republic) Ladislav Lala	Tatra	48:19:17	02:41:15
10	3	(Portugal) Elisabete Jacinto (Portugal) José Marques (Portugal) Marco Cochinho	MAN	06:47:55	01:30:26	3	(Portugal) Elisabete Jacinto (Portugal) José Marques (Portugal) Marco Cochinho	MAN	49:04:57	03:26:55
11	1	(Russia) Sergey Kuprianov (Russia) Alexander Kuprianov (Russia) Anatoly Tanin	Kamaz	01:43:23		1	(Russia) Anton Shibalov (Russia) Robert Amatych (Russia) Almaz Khisamiev	Kamaz	47:22:01	
11	2	(Russia) Anton Shibalov (Russia) Robert Amatych (Russia) Almaz Khisamiev	Kamaz	01:43:59	00:00:36	2	(Czech Republic) Tomas Tomecek (Czech Republic) Ladislav Lala	Tatra	50:13:48	02:51:47
11	3	(Czech Republic) Tomas Tomecek (Czech Republic) Ladislav Lala	Tatra	01:54:31	00:11:08	3	(Portugal) Elisabete Jacinto (Portugal) José Marques (Portugal) Marco Cochinho	MAN	50:59:34	03:37:33
12	1	(Russia) Anton Shibalov (Russia) Robert Amatych (Russia) Almaz Khisamiev	Kamaz	00:13:33		1	(Russia) Anton Shibalov (Russia) Robert Amatych (Russia) Almaz Khisamiev	Kamaz	47:22:01	
12	2	(Hungary) Miklos Kovacs (Hungary) Peter Czegledi (Hungary) Laszlo Acs	Scania	00:14:12	00:39	2	(Czech Republic) Tomas Tomecek (Czech Republic) Ladislav Lala	Tatra	50:13:48	02:51:47
12	3	(Czech Republic) Tomas Tomecek (Czech Republic) Ladislav Lala	Tatra	00:16:08	02:35	3	(Portugal) Elisabete Jacinto (Portugal) José Marques (Portugal) Marco Cochinho	MAN	50:59:34	03:37:33

== Final standings ==
=== Bikes ===
Pos	No.	Rider	Bike	Time	Gap
1	100	(Norway) Pål Ullevålseter	KTM	48:12:13	
2	118	(United Kingdom) Andrew Newland	KTM	54:14:53	+06:02:40
3	102	(France) Stephane Hamard	Husqvarna	54:41:50	+06:29:37
4	115	(Russia) Dmitry Agoshkov	KTM	54:44:50	+06:32:37
5	107	(Italy) Stefano Chiussi	Husqvarna	56:10:28	+07:58:15
6	110	(Slovakia) Jan Zatko	KTM	56:19:41	+08:07:28
7	130	(Portugal) José Sousa Sr.	KTM	56:24:58	+08:12:45
8	131	(Portugal) José Sousa Jr.	KTM	56:30:16	+08:18:03
9	111	(Slovakia) Benko Martin	KTM	57:24:25	+09:12:12
10	165	(France) Julien Sanchez	Yamaha	60:20:02	+12:07:49

=== Cars ===
Pos	No.	Driver Co-Driver	Car	Time	Gap
1	201	(Kazakhstan) Kanat Shagirov (Kazakhstan) Vitaliy Yevtyekhov	Toyota Overdrive	43:11:50	
2	202	(France) Pascal Thomasse (France) Pascal Larroque	Optimus MD	43:36:38	+00:24:48
3	210	(France) Mathieu Serradori (France) Didier Haquette	Proto	44:45:13	+01:33:23
4	200	(France) Jean Antoine Sabatier (Italy) Agostino Rizzardi	Bugga One	44:53:28	+01:41:38
5	214	(France) Patrick Martin (France) Didier Bigot	Volkswagen Buggy	45:35:55	+02:24:05
6	206	(France) Jean Pierre Strugo (France) Christophe Crespo	Optimus MD	45:42:41	+02:30:51
7	203	(Kazakhstan) Yuriy Sazonov (Kazakhstan) Arslan Shakhimov	Hummer H3	47:30:16	+04:18:26
8	223	(France) Jeremie Choiseau (France) Jean Brucy	Optimus MD	47:58:58	+04:47:08
9	226	(France) David Gerard (France) Gerard Dubuy	Optimus MD	48:03:01	+04:51:11
10	211	(France) Guillaume Gomez (France) Herve Lavergne	Optimus MD	48:28:30	+05:16:40

=== Trucks ===
Pos	No.	Driver Co-Drivers	Truck	Time	Gap
1	400	(Russia) Anton Shibalov (Russia) Robert Amatych (Russia) Almaz Khisamiev	Kamaz	47:22:01	
2	401	(Czech Republic) Tomas Tomecek (Czech Republic) Ladislav Lala	Tatra	50:13:48	+02:51:47
3	402	(Portugal) Elisabete Jacinto (Portugal) José Marques (Portugal) Marco Cochinho	MAN	50:59:34	+03:37:33
4	403	(Russia) Sergey Kuprianov (Russia) Alexander Kuprianov (Russia) Anatoly Tanin	Kamaz	64:23:35	+17:01:34
5	405	(Hungary) Miklos Kovacs (Hungary) Peter Czegledi (Hungary) Laszlo Acs	Scania	100:36:23	+53:14:22
6	406	(France) Ahmed Benbekhti (France) Samir Benbekhti (France) Michael Racine	MAN	148:24:33	+101:02:32
