= Gev Sella =

Israeli-South African motorcycle rider

Gev Teddy Sella (Hebrew: גב טדי סלע) is an Israeli-South African motorcycle rider.

== Career ==
A native of Netanya, he has been riding on a motorcycle since he was five years old. He has two younger brothers, Tsuk and Suff. "The best thing I can do is to be on the bike. Whenever I can I do it. (…) Every time I can, I’m going on the bike", Sella stated during the 2017 Africa Eco Race.

In July 2016, Sella came in second at the FIM Junior Cross-Country Rallies World Cup in Italy. This was during the 9th Sardegna Rally Race, which he finished 14th overall and second in Junior class. In August/September 2016, he raced at the Serres Rally in Greece, finishing in 19th place.

Participating in his first rally-raid at the age of 17, Sella kicked off 2017 with a bang, taking home the overall victory in the bikes’ category at the Africa Eco Race, winning five stages and holding off two-time race winner Pål Anders Ullevålseter who finished second overall. Miri Regev, the Israeli minister of culture and sports, congratulated him in a phone call: "You have brought honor and pride to the State of Israel. You made history", Regev said. Sella was supported by his parents throughout the Africa Eco Race, with his father preparing the bike and his mother doing organisational work.
