= Jacopo Cerutti =

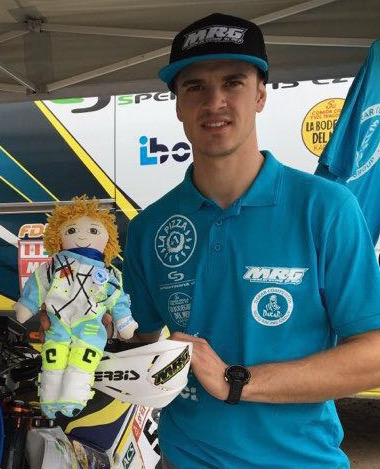
- Nationality: Italian
- Born: 25 November 1989 (age 36) Lecco, Italy

Rally Raid career
- Debut season: 2015
- Current team: Solarys Racing
- Engine: Husqvarna Motorcycles
- Championships: Dakar Rally

Jacopo Cerutti (born 25 November 1989) is an Italian rally raid and Enduro rider.

== Career ==
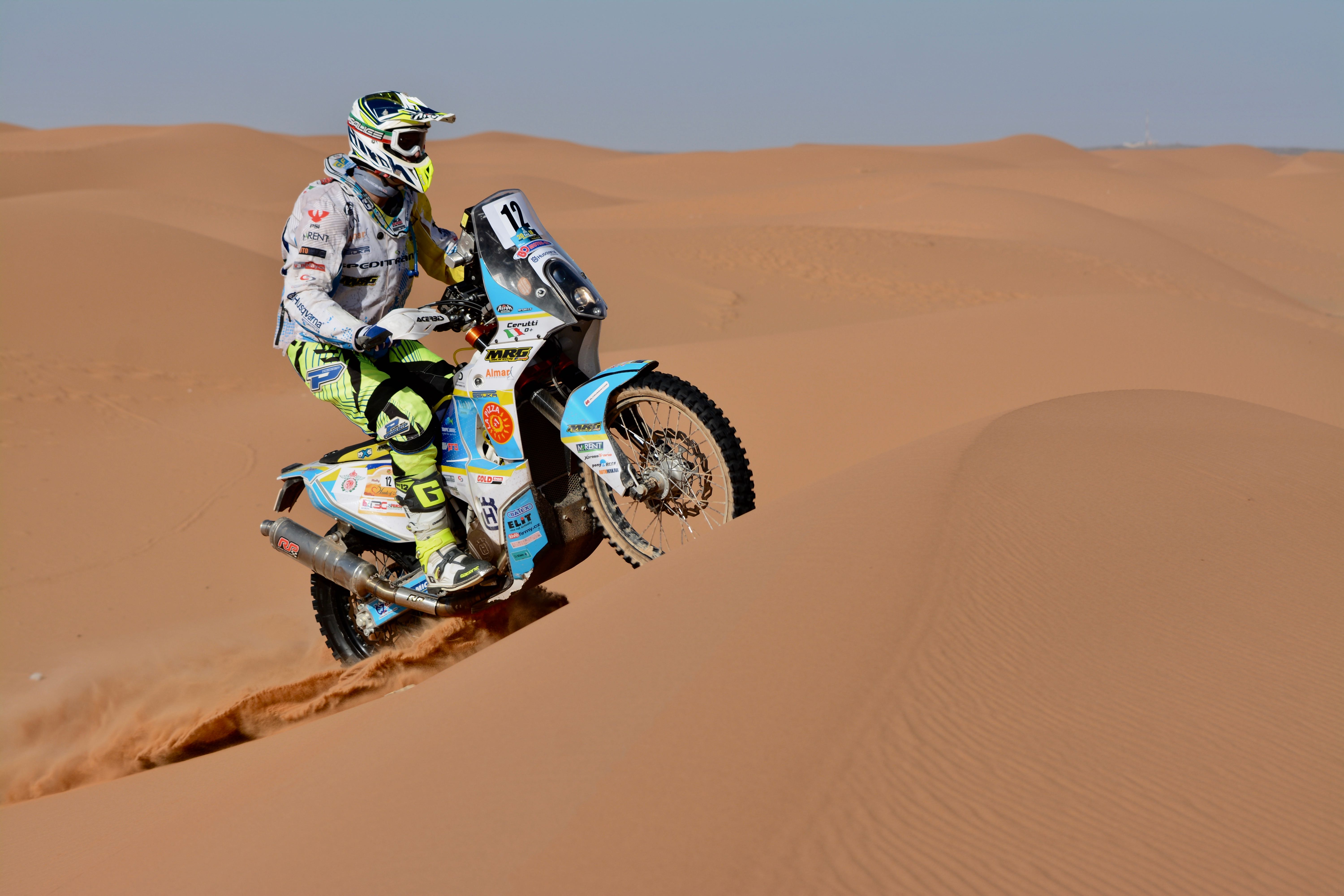
Jacopo Cerutti rides a sand dune at Merzouga Rally in Marocco

Cerutti began riding motocross at the age of 14, after having started his racing career with BMX. At 16 years old, Cerutti made his debut in enduro and, within three years, was already fighting for the Italian Junior Championship podium.

After winning one European and four Italian enduro awards, since 2015, Cerutti became dedicated to Rally raid. He quickly collected numerous successes in this discipline as well: a 12th-place finish at his first Dakar Rally and three first-place finished in the Italian Rally Championship, racing for Motoclub Intimiano.

In 2018, Cerutti achieved 20th place at Dakar Rally and opened the 2019 season racing with Solarys Racing.

== Results ==
=== Enduro ===
| 2014 | Campionato Europeo Enduro | European Champion Senior | 1st |
| 2012 | Campionato Europeo Enduro | Class E1J | 2nd |
| 2015 | Campionato Italiano Enduro | Italian Champion Senior | 1st |
| 2014 | Campionato Italiano Enduro | Italian Champion Senior | 1st |
| 2013 | Campionato Italiano Enduro | Italian Champion Senior | 1st |
| 2012 | Campionato Italiano Enduro | Italian Champion Junior | 1st |
| 2012 | Six Days | 1st in C1 Class | 1st |

=== Rally Raid ===
| Year | Event | Finish | Position |
|---|---|---|---|
| 2015 | Campionato Italiano Motorally & Raid TT | Overall Champion, Class 250 and RaidTT | 1st |
| 2015 | Hellas Rally Raid | | 1st |
| 2015 | Rally di Sardegna | | 6th |
| 2015 | OiLibya Rally | | 10th |
| 2016 | Campionato Italiano Motorally & Raid TT | Overall Champion and Class 450 | 1st |
| 2016 | Dakar Rally | 12th place | 12th |
| 2017 | Campionato Italiano Motorally & Raid TT | Overall Champion and Class 450 | 1st |
| 2017 | Dakar Rally | Withdrew | - |
| 2017 | Merzouga Rally | | 6th |
| 2018 | Dakar Rally | 20th place | 20th |
| 2020 | Dakar Rally | 22nd place | 22nd |
| 2024 | Africa Eco Race | Overall Champion and Class Over 650cc | 1st |
