= 2024 Africa Eco Race =

Part of the Africa Eco Race
← Previous event	Next event →
- Host country: Monaco, Morocco, Mauritania and Senegal
- Dates run: 30 December 2023–14 January 2024
- Start: Monaco
- Finish: (Senegal) Dakar
- Stages: 12
- Stage surface: Gravel, sand
- Overall distance: 6,317.11 km (3,925.27 mi)

Results
- Bikes winner: (Italy) Jacopo Cerutti; Aprilia
- Cars winner: (France) Gautier Paulin (France) Remi Boulanger; Apache
- Trucks winner: (Czech Republic) Tomáš Tomeček; Tatra
- Crews: 72 at start, 55 at finish

The 2024 Africa Eco Race was the 15th edition of the rally raid in North Africa travelling through Morocco, Mauritania, and finishing in Senegal after departing initially from Monaco and travelling by boat from France.

The 15th Edition was originally scheduled to run in March 2023 but in January 2023 the organization announced its cancellation due to major flooding in Senegal. The new start date for the 15th Edition was announced as a "return to its historical dates, and will start on December 30th 2023 to finish on the shores of the Lac Rose on January 14th 2024".

== Entry list ==
72 vehicles lined up at the start of the event which included 47 motorcycles (1 quad) and 25 cars, SSVs, and trucks.

55 vehicles finished the event with 33 motorcycles and 22 cars, SSVs, and trucks.

=== Competitor list ===
Entry list — Bikes

No.	Driver	Make	Type	Team	Category	Class
103	(Italy) Alessandro Botturi	Yamaha	Ténéré 700	Yamaha Tenere World Raid Team	650m	
105	(Spain) Juan Garcia Pedrero	Harley-Davidson	Pan America 1250	Harley Davidson	1000m	
107	(Italy) Stefano Chiussi	Husqvarna	FE 501	Offroad Crew	+450	
111	(Italy) Jacopo Cerutti	Aprilia	Tuareg 660 Rally	Aprilia Racing Gcorse	650m	
113	(Spain) Pol Tarrés	Yamaha	Ténéré 700	Yamaha Tenere World Raid Team	650m	
114	(Italy) Alessandro Ruoso	Yamaha	Ténéré 700	Twinsbike Racing Team	650m	
115	(Italy) Angelo Tazzari	Yamaha	Ténéré 700	Twinsbike Racing Team	650m	
119	(Italy) Pietro Peila Ugo Domenico	KTM	450 Rally Factory Replica	Offroad Crew	-450	
120	(France) Nicolas Bottu	KTM	EXC-F 450	United We Trace	-450	
122	(Italy) Francesco Montanari	Aprilia	Tuareg 660 Rally	Aprilia Racing Gcorse	650m	
123	(Netherlands) Robert Van Olst	Husqvarna	FE 450	Wood Bv	-450	
124	(Belgium) Nicolas Charlier	Yamaha	Ténéré 700	Yamaha Tenere World Raid Team	650m	
125	(Morocco) Guillaume Borne	Husqvarna	FR 450 Rally Replica	Casteu Trophy	-450	
127	(Italy) Giovanni Stigliano	Husqvarna	FE 501	Jbrally Asd	+450	
128	(Italy) Nicola Quinto	Husqvarna	FR 450 Rally Replica	Jacque De Molay Team Solarys	-450	
131	(Switzerland) Alexandre Vaudan	KTM	450 Rally Factory Replica	Casteu Trophy	-450	
133	(Italy) Andrea Gava	Beta	430 RR	Nsm Racing Team	+450	
134	(France) Thierry Costard	KTM	450 Rally Factory Replica	Ldz56	-450	
135	(Italy) Bruno Arcuri	Honda	CRF 450	Orobica Raid	-450	
136	(France) Attilio Fert	KTM	450 Rally Factory Replica	France Road Book	-450	
137	(Italy) Nicola Dutto	KTM	EXC-F 500	Offroad Crew	+450	
138	(Spain) Julian Garcia VillaRRubia	KTM	EXC-F 500	Offroad Crew	+450	
139	(Spain) Ruben Goni Saldana	KTM	EXC-F 500	Offroad Crew	+450	
140	(France) Antoine Detourbet	Husqvarna	FE 450	Antoine Detourbet	-450	
141	(Italy) Alessandro Rigoni	Husqvarna	FR 450 Rally Replica	Solarys Racing	-450	
142	(Italy) Francesco Tognato	Husqvarna	FR 450 Rally Replica	Offroad Crew / Team Ice	-450	
143	(France) Kevin Durand	Honda	CRF 450 Rx	Rs Moto	-450	
144	(Italy) Marco Aurelio Fontana	Honda	CRF	Honda Genuine Oil	-450	
145	(Portugal) Nuno Silva	KTM	450 Rally Factory Replica	Old Friends Rally Team	-450	
146	(Germany) Jan Hendrik Erbach	KTM	450 Rally Factory Replica	Solarys Racing	-450	
148	(France) Patrice Carillon	KTM	450 Rally Factory Replica	Sarl Hotel Des Sources	-450	
157	(United Kingdom) Vanessa Ruck	KTM	450 Rally Factory Replica	The Girl On A Bike	-450	Female
163	(Italy) Paolo Caprioni	Ducati	Desert X	Team Kapriony	650m	
165	(Spain) Rafael Gomez Cuesta	KTM	EXC-F 450	Offroad Crew	-450	
171	(Italy) Massimiliano Guerrini	Husqvarna	Husqvarna FE 450	Solarys Racing	-450	
174	(Italy) Francesco Muratori	Beta	RR450	Nsm Racing Team	-450	
177	(Japan) Ai Tanaka	Husqvarna	FE 501	Ai78	+450	
178	(Austria) Gunter Schmutz	KTM	450 Rally Factory Replica	Male Moto	-450	
179	(Italy) Pierpaolo Vivaldi	KTM	450 Rally Factory Replica	Twinsbike Racing Team	-450	
181	(Italy) Marco Menichini	Husqvarna	FR 450 Rally Replica	Solarys Racing	-450	
185	(Norway) Joachim Hellsten	KTM	450 Rally Factory Replica	A4pluss	-450	
186	(Norway) Richard Skarpaas	KTM	450 Rally Factory Replica	A4pluss	-450	
190	(Italy) Francesco Puocci	KTM	450 Rally Factory Replica	Team Puocci	OP	
193	(Italy) Giovanni Gritti	Honda	CRF	Rsmoto Racing Team Honda Oil	-450	
195	(United Kingdom) Timothy Bradshaw	Husqvarna	FR 450 Rally Replica	Moto Joe #Becauseican	OP	
196	(Morocco) Amine Echiguer	KTM	EXC-F 450	Echiguer Amine	-450	
199	(Belgium) Laurent Hellemans	Yamaha	Raptor	Hellau	Q	

Entry list — Cars

No.	Driver	Co-driver	Make	Type	Team	Group	Class
200	(Hungary) Varga Imre	(Hungary) Jozsef Toma	Toyota	Hilux	Varga Racing Team	T1	1.1
204	(France) Bernard Andrieux	(France) Jean-Pierre Armandet	Nissan	Buggy	TTP	OP	
205	(Italy) Stefano Rossi	(Italy) Jacopo Casini	Nissan	Patrol Y61	Rossi 4x4 Asd	EXP	
206	(Netherlands) Willem Alexander Taale	(Netherlands) Servaas Van Herk	Toyota	Rav4	Wuta Rallysport	OP	
207	(Netherlands) Teun Stam	(Netherlands) Rene Bargeman	Toyota	Rally Cruiser	Schijf Rally	T1	1.2
208	(Japan) Yoshimasa Sugawara	(Japan) Naoko Roquet	Suzuki	Jimny JB64	Equipe Sugawara	OP	
209	(France) Eric Coquide	(France) Gregoire Coquide	Nissan	Proto Atacama	Renault Trucks Rallye Raid	OP	
210	(Belgium) Pascal Feryn	(Belgium) Kurt Keysers	Toyota	Hilux	Feryn Dakar Team	T1	1.1
220	(Belgium) Koen Wauters	(Belgium) Kris Steen	Toyota	Hilux	Feryn Dakar Team	T1	1.1
250	(Niger) Eric Schiano	(Niger) Camille Pourchier	Polaris	Pro R	Harmat'team Racing	SSV	S.2
252	(Portugal) Rui Oliveira	(Portugal) Bernardo Oliveira	BRP	Maverick XRS	Old Friends Rally Team	T3	3.1
253	(Germany) Heatcliff Zingraf	(Germany) Gregory Revest	Can-Am	X3	Casteu Trophy	T4	
254	(France) Frederic Henricy	(France) Eric Bersey	Polaris	Rzr Turbo R	AT4R	SSV	S.3
255	(France) Philippe Champigne	(France) Bruno Robin	Can-Am	Maverick XRS	Team Aventure 79	SSV	S.3
256	(Spain) Carlos Vento	(Spain) Carlos Ruiz Moreno	Can-Am	Maverick XRS	Old Friends Rally Team	T4	
257	(Portugal) Ricardo Sousa	(Portugal) Jorge Brandao	Can-Am	Maverick X3	Old Friends Rally Team	T3	3.1
259	(Morocco) Souad Mouktadiri	(Morocco) Frederic Villers D'arbouet	Can-Am	Maverick X3	Souad	T4	
260	(France) Gautier Paulin	(France) Remi Boulanger	Apache		Apache	T3	3.U
261	(France) Pierre-Louis Loubet	(France) Francois Borsotto	Apache		Apache	T3	3.U

Entry list — Trucks

No.	Driver	Co-driver	Technician	Make	Type	Team	Group	Class
400	(Czech Republic) Tomáš Tomeček			Tatra	T815 2T0R45	Promet Czechoslovak Group Team	T5	5.1
401	(Netherlands) Aad Van Velsen	(Netherlands) Michel Van Velsen	(Netherlands) Marco Siemons	Scania	P 380 Lb 4x4 Hna	Van Velsen Rally Sport	T5	5.1
403	(Belgium) Cedric Feryn	(Belgium) Bjorn Burgelman	(Belgium) Tom De Leeuw	GINAF	M2223	Feryn Dakar Team	T5	5.1
409	(France) Franck Coquide	(France) Jean-Francois Delaval	(France) Daniel Penkalla	Renault	K520	Renault Trucks Rallye Raid	T5	5.1
433	(Italy) Antonio Cabini	(Italy) Carlo Cabini	(Italy) Raffaella Cabini	Mercedes-Benz	Unimog 400	Orobica Raid	T5	5.2
435	(Italy) Verzeletti Giulio	(Italy) Giuseppe Fortuna		Mercedes-Benz	Unimog 400	Orobica Raid	T5	5.2

== Stages ==
Stage	Date	Start	Finish	Connection	Special	Connection	Total	Bikes	Cars	Trucks
Check In	29 December	(France) Menton	Monaco	-	-	-	-	-	-	-
Technical Check	30 December	Monaco	Monaco	-	-	-	-	-	-	-
Boat Boarding	31 December	Monaco	(France) Sète	-	-	-	-	-	-	-
Boat Travel	1 January	(France) Sète	(Morocco) Nador	-	-	-	-	-	-	-
1	2 January	(Morocco) Nador	(Morocco) Boudnib	185	173.56	238	596.56	(Italy) Jacopo Cerutti	(Spain) Carlos Vento	(Czech Republic) Tomáš Tomeček
2	3 January	(Morocco) Boudnib	(Morocco) M'Hamid	424.9	382.72	30.96	838.58	(Italy) Jacopo Cerutti	(France) Pierre-Louis Loubet	(Netherlands) Aad Van Velsen
3	4 January	(Morocco) M'Hamid	(Morocco) Assa (Oued Draa)	5	462.70	55.18	522.88	(Italy) Alessandro Botturi	(France) Gautier Paulin	(Czech Republic) Tomáš Tomeček
4	5 January	(Morocco) Assa (Oued Draa)	(Morocco) Port Chacal	0	467.36	5.05	472.41	(Italy) Jacopo Cerutti	(France) Gautier Paulin	(Netherlands) Aad Van Velsen
5	6 January	(Morocco) Port Chacal	(Morocco) Dakhla	20.55	404.06	167.99	592.6	(Italy) Alessandro Botturi	(Belgium) Koen Wauters	(Czech Republic) Tomáš Tomeček
Rest	7 January	Rest day in (Morocco) Dakhla								
6	8 January	(Morocco) Dakhla	(Mauritania) Chami	429.15	204.62	0	633.77	(Spain) Pol Tarrés	(France) Pierre-Louis Loubet	(Netherlands) Aad Van Velsen
7	9 January	(Mauritania) Chami	(Mauritania) Chami	20.02	453.12	0	473.14	(Italy) Alessandro Botturi	(France) Pierre-Louis Loubet	(Czech Republic) Tomáš Tomeček
8	10 January	(Mauritania) Chami	(Mauritania) Amodjar	20.02	390.01	68.42	478.45	(Spain) Pol Tarrés	(Portugal) Ricardo Sousa	(Netherlands) Aad Van Velsen
9	11 January	(Mauritania) Amodjar	(Mauritania) Amodjar	36.16	363.32	67.04	466.52	(Italy) Jacopo Cerutti	(France) Pierre-Louis Loubet	(Czech Republic) Tomáš Tomeček
10	12 January	(Mauritania) Amodjar	(Mauritania) Akjoujt	0	387.88	25.33	413.21	(Italy) Alessandro Botturi	(France) Gautier Paulin	(Netherlands) Aad Van Velsen
11	13 January	(Mauritania) Akjoujt	(Senegal) Saint-Louis	13.87	247.61	255.96	517.44	(Spain) Pol Tarrés	(Belgium) Pascal Feryn	(Netherlands) Aad Van Velsen
12	14 January	(Senegal) Saint-Louis	(Senegal) Dakar	240.49	22.91	48.15	311.55	(Italy) Nicola Dutto	(Belgium) Pascal Feryn	(Czech Republic) Tomáš Tomeček
Totals					3959.87		6317.11			

== Stage results ==
=== Bike ===
	Stage result						General classification					
Stage	Pos	Competitor	Make	Class	Time	Gap	Pos	Competitor	Make	Class	Time	Gap
1	1	(Italy) Jacopo Cerutti	Aprilia	+700	01:54:09		1	(Italy) Jacopo Cerutti	Aprilia	+700	01:54:09	
1	2	(Italy) Alessandro Botturi	Yamaha	+700	01:55:56	00:01:47	2	(Italy) Alessandro Botturi	Yamaha	+700	01:55:56	00:01:47
1	3	(Spain) Pol Tarrés	Yamaha	+700	01:55:59	00:01:50	3	(Spain) Pol Tarrés	Yamaha	+700	01:55:59	00:01:50
2	1	(Italy) Jacopo Cerutti	Aprilia	+700	04:11:50		1	(Italy) Jacopo Cerutti	Aprilia	+700	06:06:09	
2	2	(Spain) Pol Tarrés	Yamaha	+700	04:19:13	00:07:23	2	(Spain) Pol Tarrés	Yamaha	+700	06:15:22	00:09:13
2	3	(Italy) Alessandro Botturi	Yamaha	+700	04:20:20	00:08:30	3	(Italy) Alessandro Botturi	Yamaha	+700	06:16:16	00:10:07
3	1	(Italy) Alessandro Botturi	Yamaha	+700	05:37:23		1	(Italy) Jacopo Cerutti	Aprilia	+700	11:47:19	
3	2	(Spain) Pol Tarrés	Yamaha	+700	05:38:52	00:01:29	2	(Italy) Alessandro Botturi	Yamaha	+700	11:53:39	00:06:20
3	3	(Italy) Jacopo Cerutti	Aprilia	+700	05:41:10	00:03:47	3	(Spain) Pol Tarrés	Yamaha	+700	11:54:14	00:06:55
4	1	(Italy) Jacopo Cerutti	Aprilia	+700	05:00:40		1	(Italy) Jacopo Cerutti	Aprilia	+700	16:49:09	
4	2	(Spain) Pol Tarrés	Yamaha	+700	05:00:40		2	(Spain) Pol Tarrés	Yamaha	+700	16:54:54	00:05:45
4	3	(Italy) Alessandro Botturi	Yamaha	+700	05:02:42	00:02:02	3	(Italy) Alessandro Botturi	Yamaha	+700	16:56:21	00:07:12
5	1	(Italy) Alessandro Botturi	Yamaha	+700	03:31:53		1	(Italy) Jacopo Cerutti	Aprilia	+700	20:25:59	
5	2	(Spain) Pol Tarrés	Yamaha	+700	03:34:10	00:02:17	2	(Italy) Alessandro Botturi	Yamaha	+700	20:28:14	00:02:15
5	3	(Italy) Jacopo Cerutti	Aprilia	+700	03:36:50	00:04:57	3	(Spain) Pol Tarrés	Yamaha	+700	20:29:04	00:03:05
6	1	(Spain) Pol Tarrés	Yamaha	+700	01:51:53		1	(Italy) Jacopo Cerutti	Aprilia	+700	22:18:49	
6	2	(Italy) Jacopo Cerutti	Aprilia	+700	01:52:50	00:00:57	2	(Spain) Pol Tarrés	Yamaha	+700	22:20:57	00:02:08
6	3	(Italy) Alessandro Botturi	Yamaha	+700	01:53:35	00:01:42	3	(Italy) Alessandro Botturi	Yamaha	+700	22:21:49	00:03:00
7	1	(Italy) Alessandro Botturi	Yamaha	+700	04:35:20		1	(Italy) Jacopo Cerutti	Aprilia	+700	26:56:09	
7	2	(Italy) Jacopo Cerutti	Aprilia	+700	04:37:20	00:02:00	2	(Italy) Alessandro Botturi	Yamaha	+700	26:57:09	00:01:00
7	3	(Italy) Francesco Montanari	Aprilia	+700	04:51:19	00:15:59	3	(Spain) Pol Tarrés	Yamaha	+700	27:24:19	00:28:10
8	1	(Spain) Pol Tarrés	Yamaha	+700	04:12:50		1	(Italy) Jacopo Cerutti	Aprilia	+700	31:14:47	
8	2	(Italy) Jacopo Cerutti	Aprilia	+700	04:18:38	00:05:48	2	(Italy) Alessandro Botturi	Yamaha	+700	31:17:50	00:03:03
8	3	(Italy) Alessandro Botturi	Yamaha	+700	04:20:41	00:07:51	3	(Spain) Pol Tarrés	Yamaha	+700	31:37:09	00:22:22
9	1	(Italy) Jacopo Cerutti	Aprilia	+700	4:27:14		1	(Italy) Jacopo Cerutti	Aprilia	+700	11:42:01	
9	2	(Spain) Pol Tarrés	Yamaha	+700	4:29:19	00:02:05	2	(Italy) Alessandro Botturi	Yamaha	+700	11:49:05	00:07:04
9	3	(Italy) Alessandro Botturi	Yamaha	+700	4:31:15	00:04:01	3	(Spain) Pol Tarrés	Yamaha	+700	12:06:28	00:24:27
10	1	(Italy) Alessandro Botturi	Yamaha	+700	1:43:45		1	(Italy) Jacopo Cerutti	Aprilia	+700	13:28:12	
10	2	(Italy) Jacopo Cerutti	Aprilia	+700	1:46:11	00:02:26	2	(Italy) Alessandro Botturi	Yamaha	+700	13:32:50	00:04:38
10	3	(France) Attilio Fert	KTM	-450	1:53:39	00:09:54	3	(Spain) Pol Tarrés	Yamaha	+700	14:02:43	00:34:31
11	1	(Spain) Pol Tarrés	Yamaha	+700	2:15:15		1	(Italy) Jacopo Cerutti	Aprilia	+700	15:52:49	
11	2	(France) Attilio Fert	KTM	-450	2:23:18	00:08:03	2	(Italy) Alessandro Botturi	Yamaha	+700	15:59:27	00:06:38
11	3	(Italy) Jacopo Cerutti	Aprilia	+700	2:24:37	00:09:22	3	(Spain) Pol Tarrés	Yamaha	+700	16:17:58	00:25:09
12	1	(Italy) Nicola Dutto	KTM	+450	0:16:09		1	(Italy) Jacopo Cerutti	Aprilia	+700	15:52:49	
12	2	(Spain) Julian Villarrubia Garcia	KTM	+450	0:16:13	00:00:04	2	(Italy) Alessandro Botturi	Yamaha	+700	15:59:27	00:06:38
12	3	(Spain) Ruben Saldana Goni	KTM	+450	0:16:13	00:00:04	3	(Spain) Pol Tarrés	Yamaha	+700	16:17:58	00:25:09

=== Car ===
	Stage result						General classification					
Stage	Pos	Competitor	Make	Class	Time	Gap	Pos	Competitor	Make	Class	Time	Gap
1	1	(Spain) Carlos Vento (Spain) Carlos Ruiz Moreno	Can-Am	T4	01:58:17		1	(Spain) Carlos Vento (Spain) Carlos Ruiz Moreno	Can-Am	T4	01:58:17	
1	2	(Portugal) Rui Oliveira (Portugal) Bernardo Oliveira	Can-Am	T3	02:01:28	00:03:11	2	(Portugal) Rui Oliveira (Portugal) Bernardo Oliveira	Can-Am	T3	02:01:28	00:03:11
1	3	(Germany) Heatcliff Zingraff (Germany) Gregory Revest	Can-Am	T4	02:01:48	00:03:31	3	(Germany) Heatcliff Zingraff (Germany) Gregory Revest	Can-Am	T4	02:01:48	00:03:31
2	1	(France) Pierre-Louis Loubet (France) Francois Borsotto	Apache	T3	04:38:35		1	(France) Gautier Paulin (France) Remi Boulanger	Apache	T3	06:46:31	
2	2	(France) Gautier Paulin (France) Remi Boulanger	Apache	T3	04:43:59	00:05:24	2	(Germany) Heatcliff Zingraff (Germany) Gregory Revest	Can-Am	T4	06:48:49	00:02:18
2	3	(Germany) Heatcliff Zingraff (Germany) Gregory Revest	Can-Am	T4	04:47:01	00:08:26	3	(France) Pierre-Louis Loubet (France) Francois Borsotto	Apache	T3	06:56:25	00:09:54
3	1	(France) Gautier Paulin (France) Remi Boulanger	Apache	T3	06:06:08		1	(France) Gautier Paulin (France) Remi Boulanger	Apache	T3	12:52:39	
3	2	(Germany) Heatcliff Zingraff (Germany) Gregory Revest	Can-Am	T4	06:07:25	00:01:17	2	(Germany) Heatcliff Zingraff (Germany) Gregory Revest	Can-Am	T4	12:56:14	00:03:35
3	3	(Niger) Eric Schiano (Niger) Camille Pourchier	Polaris	SSV	06:17:15	00:11:07	3	(France) Frederic Henricy (France) Eric Bersey	Polaris	SSV	14:10:02	01:17:23
4	1	(France) Gautier Paulin (France) Remi Boulanger	Apache	T3	05:27:25		1	(France) Gautier Paulin (France) Remi Boulanger	Apache	T3	18:32:15	
4	2	(France) Frederic Henricy (France) Eric Bersey	Polaris	SSV	05:31:24	00:03:59	2	(France) Frederic Henricy (France) Eric Bersey	Polaris	SSV	20:09:24	01:37:09
4	3	(Spain) Carlos Vento (Spain) Carlos Ruiz Moreno	Can-Am	T4	05:39:36	00:12:11	3	(Spain) Carlos Vento (Spain) Carlos Ruiz Moreno	Can-Am	T4	21:09:11	02:36:56
5	1	(Belgium) Koen Wauters (Belgium) Kris Ven Der Steen	Toyota	T1	03:31:53		1	(France) Gautier Paulin (France) Remi Boulanger	Apache	T3	22:16:11	
5	2	(Hungary) Varga Imre (Hungary) Jozsef Toma	Toyota	T1	03:34:39	00:02:46	2	(France) Frederic Henricy (France) Eric Bersey	Polaris	SSV	24:25:50	02:09:39
5	3	(Spain) Carlos Vento (Spain) Carlos Ruiz Moreno	Can-Am	T4	03:40:01	00:08:08	3	(Spain) Carlos Vento (Spain) Carlos Ruiz Moreno	Can-Am	T4	24:49:12	02:33:01
6	1	(France) Pierre-Louis Loubet (France) Francois Borsotto	Apache	T3	01:46:21		1	(France) Gautier Paulin (France) Remi Boulanger	Apache	T3	24:08:11	
6	2	(France) Gautier Paulin (France) Remi Boulanger	Apache	T3	01:52:00	00:05:39	2	(Spain) Carlos Vento (Spain) Carlos Ruiz Moreno	Can-Am	T4	26:42:41	02:34:30
6	3 (Note: Aad Van Velsen's T5 truck was actually the third vehicle but results are shown separately here.)	(Spain) Carlos Vento (Spain) Carlos Ruiz Moreno	Can-Am	T4	01:53:29	00:07:08	3	(France) Frederic Henricy (France) Eric Bersey	Polaris	SSV	27:11:05	03:02:54
7	1	(France) Pierre-Louis Loubet (France) Francois Borsotto	Apache	T3	04:42:08		1	(France) Gautier Paulin (France) Remi Boulanger	Apache	T3	29:33:39	
7	2	(Portugal) Ricardo Sousa (Portugal) Jorge Brandao	Can-Am	T3	05:11:16	00:29:08	2	(Belgium) Pascal Feryn (Belgium) Kurt Keysers	Toyota	T1	33:10:17	03:36:38
7	3	(Belgium) Pascal Feryn (Belgium) Kurt Keysers	Toyota	T1	05:12:37	00:30:29	3 (Note: Tomáš Tomeček in the T5 trucks was 3rd overall for Car/Truck on Stage 7.)	(Spain) Carlos Vento (Spain) Carlos Ruiz Moreno	Can-Am	T4	34:22:41	04:49:02
8	1	(Portugal) Ricardo Sousa (Portugal) Jorge Brandao	Can-Am	T3	04:25:15		1	(France) Gautier Paulin (France) Remi Boulanger	Apache	T3	34:18:14	
8	2	(Spain) Carlos Vento (Spain) Carlos Ruiz Moreno	Can-Am	T4	04:32:51	00:07:36	2	(Belgium) Pascal Feryn (Belgium) Kurt Keysers	Toyota	T1	38:00:06	03:41:52
8	3	(France) Gautier Paulin (France) Remi Boulanger	Apache	T3	04:44:35	00:19:20	3	(Spain) Carlos Vento (Spain) Carlos Ruiz Moreno	Can-Am	T4	39:13:32	04:55:18
9	1	(France) Pierre-Louis Loubet (France) Francois Borsotto	Apache	T3	4:42:48		1	(France) Gautier Paulin (France) Remi Boulanger	Apache	T3	15:10:57	
9	2	(Germany) Heatcliff Zingraff (Germany) Gregory Revest	Can-Am	T4	4:43:24	00:00:36	2	(Belgium) Pascal Feryn (Belgium) Kurt Keysers	Toyota	T1	19:05:55	03:54:58
9	3	(Spain) Carlos Vento (Spain) Carlos Ruiz Moreno	Can-Am	T4	4:49:19	00:06:31	3	(Spain) Carlos Vento (Spain) Carlos Ruiz Moreno	Can-Am	T4	19:56:56	04:45:59
10	1	(France) Gautier Paulin (France) Remi Boulanger	Apache	T3	1:50:46		1	(France) Gautier Paulin (France) Remi Boulanger	Apache	T3	17:01:43	
10	2	(Portugal) Ricardo Sousa (Portugal) Jorge Brandao	Can-Am	T3	1:51:12	00:00:26	2	(Belgium) Pascal Feryn (Belgium) Kurt Keysers	Toyota	T1	21:01:04	03:59:21
10	3	(Belgium) Pascal Feryn (Belgium) Kurt Keysers	Toyota	T1	1:55:09	00:04:23	3	(Spain) Carlos Vento (Spain) Carlos Ruiz Moreno	Can-Am	T4	21:58:12	04:56:29
11	1	(Belgium) Pascal Feryn (Belgium) Kurt Keysers	Toyota	T1	2:16:04		1	(France) Gautier Paulin (France) Remi Boulanger	Apache	T3	19:32:00	
11	2	(Portugal) Ricardo Sousa (Portugal) Jorge Brandao	Can-Am	T3	2:20:28	00:04:24	2	(Belgium) Pascal Feryn (Belgium) Kurt Keysers	Toyota	T1	23:17:08	03:45:08
11	3	(France) Pierre-Louis Loubet (France) Francois Borsotto	Apache	T3	2:22:30	00:06:26	3	(Spain) Carlos Vento (Spain) Carlos Ruiz Moreno	Can-Am	T4	0:41:09	05:09:09
12	1	(Belgium) Pascal Feryn (Belgium) Kurt Keysers	Toyota	T1	0:12:23		1	(France) Gautier Paulin (France) Remi Boulanger	Apache	T3	19:32:00	
12	2	(Germany) Heatcliff Zingraff (Germany) Gregory Revest	Can-Am	T4	0:12:42	00:00:19	2	(Belgium) Pascal Feryn (Belgium) Kurt Keysers	Toyota	T1	23:17:08	03:45:08
12	3	(Hungary) Varga Imre (Hungary) Jozsef Toma	Toyota	T1	0:12:49	00:00:26	3	(Spain) Carlos Vento (Spain) Carlos Ruiz Moreno	Can-Am	T4	0:41:09	05:09:09

=== Trucks ===
	Stage result					General classification				
Stage	Pos	Competitor	Make	Time	Gap	Pos	Competitor	Make	Time	Gap
1	1	(Czech Republic) Tomáš Tomeček	Tatra	02:33:45		1	(Czech Republic) Tomáš Tomeček	Tatra	02:33:45	
1	2	(Belgium) Cedric Feryn (Belgium) Bjorn Burgelman (Belgium) Tom De Leeuw	GINAF	02:36:18	00:02:33	2	(Belgium) Cedric Feryn (Belgium) Bjorn Burgelman (Belgium) Tom De Leeuw	GINAF	02:36:18	00:02:33
1	3	(Netherlands) Aad Van Velsen (Netherlands) Michel Van Velsen (Netherlands) Marco Siemons	Scania	02:53:12	00:16:54	3	(Netherlands) Aad Van Velsen (Netherlands) Michel Van Velsen (Netherlands) Marco Siemons	Scania	02:53:12	00:16:54
2	1	(Netherlands) Aad Van Velsen (Netherlands) Michel Van Velsen (Netherlands) Marco Siemons	Scania	06:44:38		1	(Czech Republic) Tomáš Tomeček	Tatra	09:21:41	
2	2	(Czech Republic) Tomáš Tomeček	Tatra	06:47:56	00:03:18	2	(Netherlands) Aad Van Velsen (Netherlands) Michel Van Velsen (Netherlands) Marco Siemons	Scania	09:37:50	00:16:09
2	3	(Belgium) Cedric Feryn (Belgium) Bjorn Burgelman (Belgium) Tom De Leeuw	GINAF	06:08:56	00:24:18	3	(Belgium) Cedric Feryn (Belgium) Bjorn Burgelman (Belgium) Tom De Leeuw	GINAF	09:45:14	00:23:33
3	1	(Czech Republic) Tomáš Tomeček	Tatra	07:49:45		1	(Czech Republic) Tomáš Tomeček	Tatra	17:11:26	
3	2	(Belgium) Cedric Feryn (Belgium) Bjorn Burgelman (Belgium) Tom De Leeuw	GINAF	08:18:12	00:28:27	2	(Belgium) Cedric Feryn (Belgium) Bjorn Burgelman (Belgium) Tom De Leeuw	GINAF	18:03:26	00:52:00
3	3	(Netherlands) Aad Van Velsen (Netherlands) Michel Van Velsen (Netherlands) Marco Siemons	Scania	09:02:24	01:12:39	3	(Netherlands) Aad Van Velsen (Netherlands) Michel Van Velsen (Netherlands) Marco Siemons	Scania	18:40:14	01:28:48
4	1	(Netherlands) Aad Van Velsen (Netherlands) Michel Van Velsen (Netherlands) Marco Siemons	Scania	05:48:02		1	(Czech Republic) Tomáš Tomeček	Tatra	23:09:11	
4	2	(Czech Republic) Tomáš Tomeček	Tatra	05:57:45	0:09:43	2	(Netherlands) Aad Van Velsen (Netherlands) Michel Van Velsen (Netherlands) Marco Siemons	Scania	24:28:16	01:19:05
4	3	(Belgium) Cedric Feryn (Belgium) Bjorn Burgelman (Belgium) Tom De Leeuw	GINAF	08:12:11	2:24:09	3	(Belgium) Cedric Feryn (Belgium) Bjorn Burgelman (Belgium) Tom De Leeuw	GINAF	26:15:37	03:06:26
5	1	(Czech Republic) Tomáš Tomeček	Tatra	03:47:06		1	(Czech Republic) Tomáš Tomeček	Tatra	26:53:48	
5	2	(Netherlands) Aad Van Velsen (Netherlands) Michel Van Velsen (Netherlands) Marco Siemons	Scania	03:51:03	00:03:57	2	(Netherlands) Aad Van Velsen (Netherlands) Michel Van Velsen (Netherlands) Marco Siemons	Scania	28:19:19	01:25:31
5	3	(Belgium) Cedric Feryn (Belgium) Bjorn Burgelman (Belgium) Tom De Leeuw	GINAF	04:26:51	00:39:45	3	(Belgium) Cedric Feryn (Belgium) Bjorn Burgelman (Belgium) Tom De Leeuw	GINAF	30:42:28	03:48:40
6	1	(Netherlands) Aad Van Velsen (Netherlands) Michel Van Velsen (Netherlands) Marco Siemons	Scania	01:53:05		1	(Czech Republic) Tomáš Tomeček	Tatra	28:48:35	
6	2	(Czech Republic) Tomáš Tomeček	Tatra	01:54:47	00:01:42	2	(Netherlands) Aad Van Velsen (Netherlands) Michel Van Velsen (Netherlands) Marco Siemons	Scania	30:12:24	01:23:49
6	3	(Belgium) Cedric Feryn (Belgium) Bjorn Burgelman (Belgium) Tom De Leeuw	GINAF	02:09:13	00:16:08	3	(Belgium) Cedric Feryn (Belgium) Bjorn Burgelman (Belgium) Tom De Leeuw	GINAF	32:51:41	04:03:06
7	1	(Czech Republic) Tomáš Tomeček	Tatra	05:30:21		1	(Czech Republic) Tomáš Tomeček	Tatra	34:18:56	
7	2	(Netherlands) Aad Van Velsen (Netherlands) Michel Van Velsen (Netherlands) Marco Siemons	Scania	05:38:23	00:08:02	2	(Netherlands) Aad Van Velsen (Netherlands) Michel Van Velsen (Netherlands) Marco Siemons	Scania	35:50:47	01:31:51
7	3	(Belgium) Cedric Feryn (Belgium) Bjorn Burgelman (Belgium) Tom De Leeuw	GINAF	06:15:59	00:45:38	3	(Belgium) Cedric Feryn (Belgium) Bjorn Burgelman (Belgium) Tom De Leeuw	GINAF	39:07:40	04:48:44
8	1	(Netherlands) Aad Van Velsen (Netherlands) Michel Van Velsen (Netherlands) Marco Siemons	Scania	05:07:33		1	(Czech Republic) Tomáš Tomeček	Tatra	39:32:39	
8	2	(Czech Republic) Tomáš Tomeček	Tatra	05:10:43	00:03:10	2	(Netherlands) Aad Van Velsen (Netherlands) Michel Van Velsen (Netherlands) Marco Siemons	Scania	40:58:20	01:25:41
8	3	(Belgium) Cedric Feryn (Belgium) Bjorn Burgelman (Belgium) Tom De Leeuw	GINAF	06:38:28	01:30:55	3	(Belgium) Cedric Feryn (Belgium) Bjorn Burgelman (Belgium) Tom De Leeuw	GINAF	45:46:08	06:13:29
9	1	(Czech Republic) Tomáš Tomeček	Tatra	05:28:40		1	(Czech Republic) Tomáš Tomeček	Tatra	45:01:19	
9	2	(Belgium) Cedric Feryn (Belgium) Bjorn Burgelman (Belgium) Tom De Leeuw	GINAF	06:15:08	00:46:28	2	(Netherlands) Aad Van Velsen (Netherlands) Michel Van Velsen (Netherlands) Marco Siemons	Scania	47:25:22	02:24:03
9	3	(Netherlands) Aad Van Velsen (Netherlands) Michel Van Velsen (Netherlands) Marco Siemons	Scania	06:27:02	00:58:22	3	(Belgium) Cedric Feryn (Belgium) Bjorn Burgelman (Belgium) Tom De Leeuw	GINAF	52:01:16	06:59:57
10	1	(Netherlands) Aad Van Velsen (Netherlands) Michel Van Velsen (Netherlands) Marco Siemons	Scania	02:02:37		1	(Czech Republic) Tomáš Tomeček	Tatra	47:10:32	
10	2	(Czech Republic) Tomáš Tomeček	Tatra	02:09:13	00:06:36	2	(Netherlands) Aad Van Velsen (Netherlands) Michel Van Velsen (Netherlands) Marco Siemons	Scania	49:27:59	02:17:27
10	3	(Belgium) Cedric Feryn (Belgium) Bjorn Burgelman (Belgium) Tom De Leeuw	GINAF	02:21:42	00:19:05	3	(Belgium) Cedric Feryn (Belgium) Bjorn Burgelman (Belgium) Tom De Leeuw	GINAF	54:22:58	07:12:26
11	1	(Netherlands) Aad Van Velsen (Netherlands) Michel Van Velsen (Netherlands) Marco Siemons	Scania	02:34:06		1	(Czech Republic) Tomáš Tomeček	Tatra	49:45:56	
11	2	(Czech Republic) Tomáš Tomeček	Tatra	02:35:24	00:01:18	2	(Netherlands) Aad Van Velsen (Netherlands) Michel Van Velsen (Netherlands) Marco Siemons	Scania	52:02:05	02:16:09
11	3	(Belgium) Cedric Feryn (Belgium) Bjorn Burgelman (Belgium) Tom De Leeuw	GINAF	02:58:23	00:24:17	3	(Belgium) Cedric Feryn (Belgium) Bjorn Burgelman (Belgium) Tom De Leeuw	GINAF	57:21:21	07:35:25
12	1	(Czech Republic) Tomáš Tomeček	Tatra	00:16:15		1	(Czech Republic) Tomáš Tomeček	Tatra	49:45:56	
12	2	(Belgium) Cedric Feryn (Belgium) Bjorn Burgelman (Belgium) Tom De Leeuw	GINAF	00:16:46	00:00:31	2	(Netherlands) Aad Van Velsen (Netherlands) Michel Van Velsen (Netherlands) Marco Siemons	Scania	52:02:05	02:16:09
12	3	(Netherlands) Aad Van Velsen (Netherlands) Michel Van Velsen (Netherlands) Marco Siemons	Scania	00:19:19	00:03:04	3	(Belgium) Cedric Feryn (Belgium) Bjorn Burgelman (Belgium) Tom De Leeuw	GINAF	57:21:21	07:35:25

== Final standings ==
=== Bikes ===
==== General ====
Pos	No.	Rider	Make	Class	Time	Gap	Penalty
1	111	(Italy) Jacopo Cerutti	Aprilia	+700	39:52:49		00:04
2	103	(Italy) Alessandro Botturi	Yamaha	+700	39:59:27	00:06:38	00:06
3	113	(Spain) Pol Tarrés	Yamaha	+700	40:17:58	00:25:09	00:16
4	131	(Switzerland) Alexandre Vaudan	KTM	-450	44:22:39	04:29:50	00:15
5	136	(France) Attilio Fert	KTM	-450	45:27:52	05:35:03	00:19
6	144	(Italy) Marco Aurelio Fontana	Honda	-450	45:47:08	05:54:19	00:17
7	181	(Italy) Marco Menichini	Husqvarna	-450	45:55:33	06:02:44	00:30
8	122	(Italy) Francesco Monanari	Aprilia	+700	47:46:06	07:53:17	00:22
9	124	(Belgium) Nicolas Charlier	Yamaha	+700	47:48:57	07:56:08	00:07
10	128	(Italy) Nicola Quinto	Husqvarna	-450	48:15:33	08:22:44	00:15

==== Other ====
	Under 450cc			Over 450cc			650cc multicylinder			1000cc multicylinder		
Pos	No.	Rider	Make	No.	Rider	Make	No.	Rider	Make	No.	Rider	Make
1st place, gold medalist(s)	131	(Switzerland) Alexandre Vaudan	KTM	127	(Italy) Giovanni Stigliano	Husqvarna	111	(Italy) Jacopo Cerutti	Aprilia	105	(Spain) Juan Pedrero Garcia	Harley-Davidson
2nd place, silver medalist(s)	136	(France) Attilio Fert	KTM	107	(Italy) Stefano Chiussi	KTM	103	(Italy) Alessandro Botturi	Yamaha	Only 1 entry		
3rd place, bronze medalist(s)	144	(Italy) Marco Aurelio Fontana	Honda	137	(Italy) Nicola Dutto	KTM	113	(Spain) Pol Tarrés	Yamaha	Only 1 entry		

Class	No.	Rider	Make
Female	131	(United Kingdom) Vanessa Ruck	KTM
Junior (under 25)	181	(Italy) Marco Menichini	Husqvarna
Veteran (over 40)	103	(Italy) Alessandro Botturi	Yamaha
Rookie	131	(Switzerland) Alexandre Vaudan	KTM

=== Cars ===
==== General ====
Pos	No.	Driver Co-Driver	Make	Class	Time	Gap	Penalty
1	260	(France) Gautier Paulin (France) Remi Boulanger	Apache	T3	43:32:00		
2	210	(Belgium) Pascal Feryn (Belgium) Kurt Keysers	Toyota	T1	47:17:08	3:45:08	00:12
3	256	(Spain) Carlos Vento (Spain) Carlos Ruiz Moreno	Can-Am	T4	48:41:09	5:09:09	01:18
4 (Note: Tomáš Tomeček finished 4th in the combined Car/Truck ranking.)	254	(France) Frederic Henricy (France) Eric Bersey	Polaris	SSV	52:22:11	8:50:11	00:04
5 (Note: Aad Van Velsen finished 5th in the combined Car/Truck ranking.)	207	(Netherlands) Teun Stam (Netherlands) Rene Bargeman	Toyota	T1	52:51:18	9:19:18	00:15
6	252	(Portugal) Rui Oliveira (Portugal) Bernardo Oliveira	Can-Am	T3	57:34:37	14:02:37	07:15
7	257	(Portugal) Ricardo Sousa (Portugal) Jorge Brandao	Can-Am	T3	58:54:35	15:22:35	10:47
8 (Note: Cedric Feryn finished 8th in the combined Car/Truck ranking.)	261	(France) Pierre-Louis Loubet (France) Francois Borsotto	Apache	T3	58:59:58	15:27:58	06:04
9	200	(Hungary) Varga Imre (Hungary) Jozsef Toma	Toyota	T1	65:01:21	21:29:21	08:28
10	259	(Morocco) Souad Mouktadiri (Morocco) Frederic Villiers D'Arbouet	Can-Am	T4	71:48:02	28:16:02	06:01

==== Other ====
SSV
Pos	No.	Driver Co-Driver	Make
1st place, gold medalist(s)	254	(France) Frederic Henricy (France) Eric Bersey	Polaris
2nd place, silver medalist(s)	255	(France) Philippe Champigne (France) Bruno Robin	Can-Am
3rd place, bronze medalist(s)	Only 2 finishers		

Class	No.	Driver Co-Driver	Make
T1.1	210	(Belgium) Pascal Feryn (Belgium) Kurt Keysers	Toyota
T1.2	207	(Netherlands) Teun Stam (Netherlands) Rene Bargeman	Toyota
T3.1	252	(Portugal) Rui Oliveira (Portugal) Bernardo Oliveira	Can-Am
T3.U	260	(France) Gautier Paulin (France) Remi Boulanger	Apache
T4	256	(Spain) Carlos Vento (Spain) Carlos Ruiz Moreno	Can-Am
EXP	205	(Italy) Stefano Rossi (Italy) Jacopo Casini	Nissan
OPEN	209	(France) Eric Coquide (France) Gregoire Coquide	Nissan
Solo		?	
Car -2L		?	

=== Trucks ===
==== General ====
Pos	No.	Driver Co-Drivers	Make	Time	Gap	Penalty
1 (Note: Finished 4th in the combined Car/Truck ranking.)	400	(Czech Republic) Tomáš Tomeček	Tatra	49:45:56		-00:10
2 (Note: Finished 5th in the combined Car/Truck ranking.)	401	(Netherlands) Aad Van Velsen (Netherlands) Michel Van Velsen (Netherlands) Marco Siemons	Scania	52:02:05	02:16:09	
3 (Note: Finished 8th in the combined Car/Truck ranking.)	403	(Belgium) Cedric Feryn (Belgium) Bjorn Burgelman (Belgium) Tom De Leeuw	GINAF	57:21:21	07:35:25	
4	435	(Italy) Verzeletti Giulio (Italy) Giuseppe Fortuna	Mercedes-Benz	72:52:26	23:06:30	02:45
5	409	(France) Franck Coquide (France) Jean-Francois Delaval (France) Daniel Penkalla	Renault	103:44:04	53:58:08	21:51
6	433	(Italy) Antonio Cabini (Italy) Carlo Cabini (Italy) Raffaella Cabini	Mercedes-Benz	107:38:03	57:52:07	32:00

==== Other ====
Class	No.	Driver Co-Driver	Make
T5.1	400	(Czech Republic) Tomáš Tomeček	Tatra
T5.2	435	(Italy) Verzeletti Giulio (Italy) Giuseppe Fortuna	Mercedes-Benz
