= Anton Shibalov =

Russian rally driver

- Nationality: Russian
- Born: Anton Yuryevich Shibalov; 25 April 1984 (age 42) Moscow, Soviet Union
- Debut season: 2014
- Current team: Kamaz-Master

Anton Yuryevich Shibalov (Russian: Антон Юрьевич Шибалов; born 25 April 1984) is a Russian rally raid driver who specializes in the truck category.

== Career ==
Shibalov made his Dakar Rally debut in the 2014 edition, finishing in 5th position in the general classification. In the 2020 edition, he achieved his best performance finishing in second position behind his teammate Andrey Karginov.

In other events outside the Dakar Rally, he won the Silk Way Rally in the 2019 edition, having finished second and third in 2017 and 2018 respectively. He has also won the Africa Eco Race three times in the 2013, 2015 and 2016 editions.

== Dakar Rally results ==
Year	Class	Vehicle	Position	Stages won
2014	Trucks	(Russia) Kamaz	5th	0
2015–16	Trucks	(Russia) Kamaz	DNP	–
2017	Trucks	(Russia) Kamaz	19th	0
2018	Trucks	(Russia) Kamaz	DSQ	0
2019	Trucks	(Russia) Kamaz	DNP	–
2020	Trucks	(Russia) Kamaz	2nd	3
2021	Trucks	(Russia) Kamaz	2nd	2
2022	Trucks	(Russia) Kamaz	3rd	1

- 2018: On Stage 11 disqualified for omitting control points after his truck caught fire

== Winner ==
- Silk Way Rally: 2019
- Africa Race: 2013, 2015, 2016
- The Great Steppe: 2014, 2015
