= Tagounite =

- rural commune
- Interactive map of Tagounite
- Coordinates: 29°59′N 5°35′W
- Country: Morocco
- Region: Drâa-Tafilalet
- Province: Zagora Province
- Elevation: 605 m (1,985 ft)
- Time zone: UTC+0 (WET)
  - Summer (DST): UTC+1 (WEST)

Tagounite is a town and rural commune in the Zagora Province, Drâa-Tafilalet, Morocco, with about 17,412 inhabitants as of the 2004 census.

Tagounite is known for its abandoned kasbahs, as well as numerous meteorites found in the area. It counted a sizeable Jewish population before the mass Moroccan Jewish exodus to Israel.

Tagounite has been one of the arrival points at the annual Africa Eco Race.

The Draa River flows through the commune, which has benefited from numerous water distribution and demineralization projects in recent years.
