= Assa, Morocco =

Town in Guelmim-Oued Noun, Morocco

Assa آسا ⴰⵙⵙⴰ
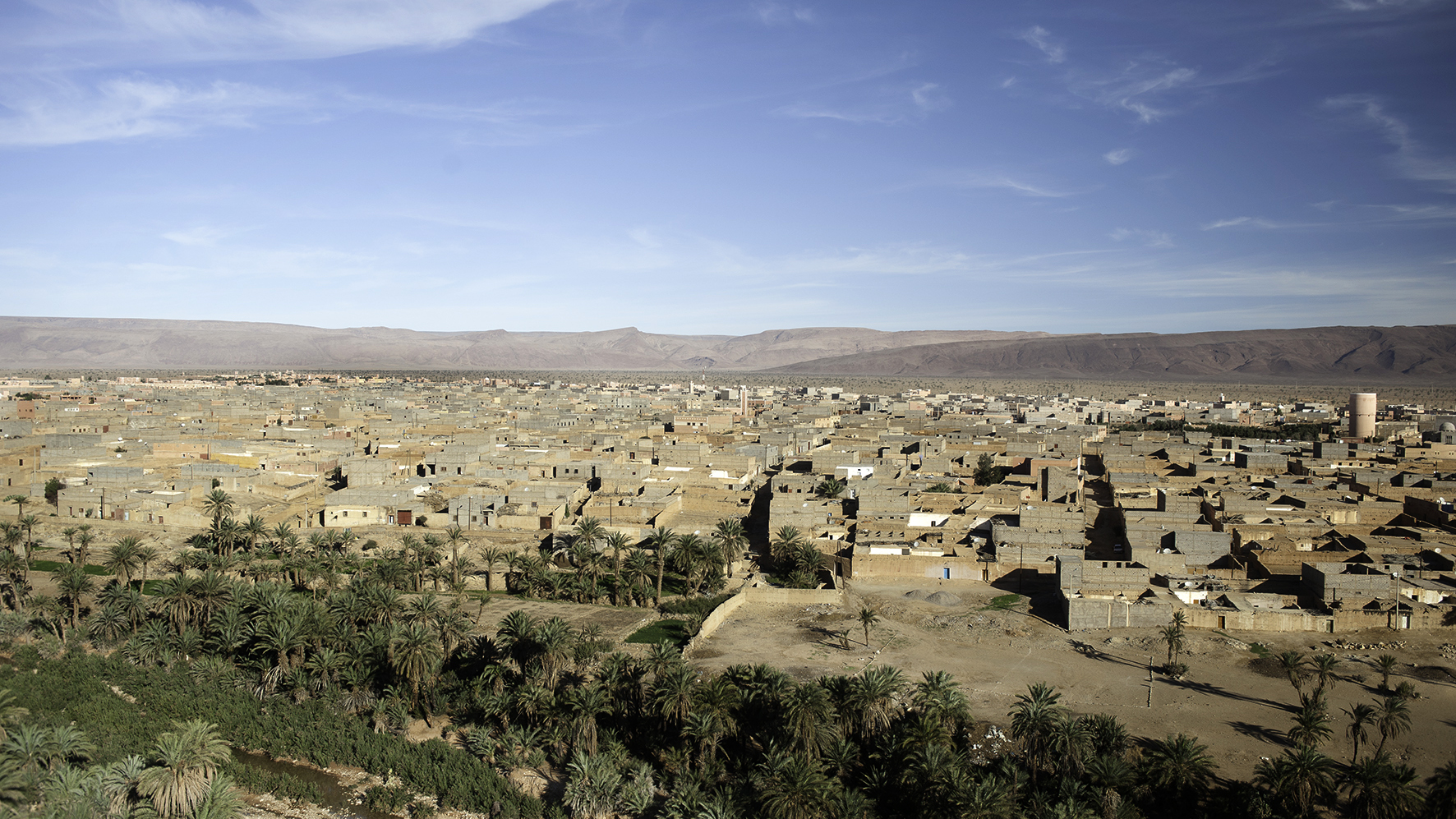
- Interactive map of Assa
- Coordinates: 28°36′31″N 9°25′37″W
- Country: Morocco
- Region: Guelmim-Oued Noun
- Province: Assa-Zag Province

Population (2012)
  - Total: 18,367
- Time zone: UTC+0 (GMT)

Assa (Arabic: آسا, Standard Moroccan Tamazight: ⴰⵙⵙⴰ) is a small town in southern Morocco, in the Assa-Zag province of the Guelmim-Oued Noun region, about 100 kilometres (62 mi) south-east of Guelmim and about 300 kilometres (190 mi) south-west of Foum Zguid. It lies in a desert area north of the Jbel Ouarkziz and is part of the Sahrawi-inhabited southern region of Morocco. The Draa River lies to its south, and the N12 highway crosses the town.

In the 2012 census Assa had a population of 18,367, the largest in its province and sixth largest in the region.
