= List of lighthouses in Western Sahara =

This is a list of lighthouses in Western Sahara, which are located along the Atlantic coastline of the territory. All of the lighthouses included here are under Moroccan-occupation.

== Lighthouses ==
Name	Image	Location Coordinates	Waterbody	Year built	Tower height	Focal height	Range nml	Admiralty number
Cabo Bojador		Cape Bojador; 26.1239°N 14.4861°W	Atlantic	1959	45 m (148 ft)	70 m (230 ft)	24 nmi (44 km)	D2628
El Cabiño		NE of Cape Bojador; 26.426°N 14.1802°W	Atlantic	Unknown	32 m (105 ft)	37 m (121 ft)	9 nmi (17 km)	D2626
Cabo Huit		Neuifed; 25.0833°N 14.8352°W	Atlantic		12 m (39 ft)	173 m (568 ft)	18 nmi (33 km)	
Cabo Sept		Aftissat; 25.5920°N 14.6849°W	Atlantic		12 m (39 ft)	70 m (230 ft)	18 nmi (33 km)	
Dakhla (Villa Cisneros)		Dakhla (Villa Cisneros); 23.7265°N 15.9544°W	Atlantic	1916	56 m (184 ft)	76 m (249 ft)	20 nmi (37 km)	

== See also ==
- List of lighthouses in Algeria (to the east)
- List of lighthouses in Mauritania (to the south)
- List of lighthouses in Morocco (to the north)
- Lists of lighthouses and lightvessels
