= Zaouiat Ahmed Ben Yaddas =

Zaouiat Ahmed Ben Yaddas زاوية أحمد بن يداس
- Religious site
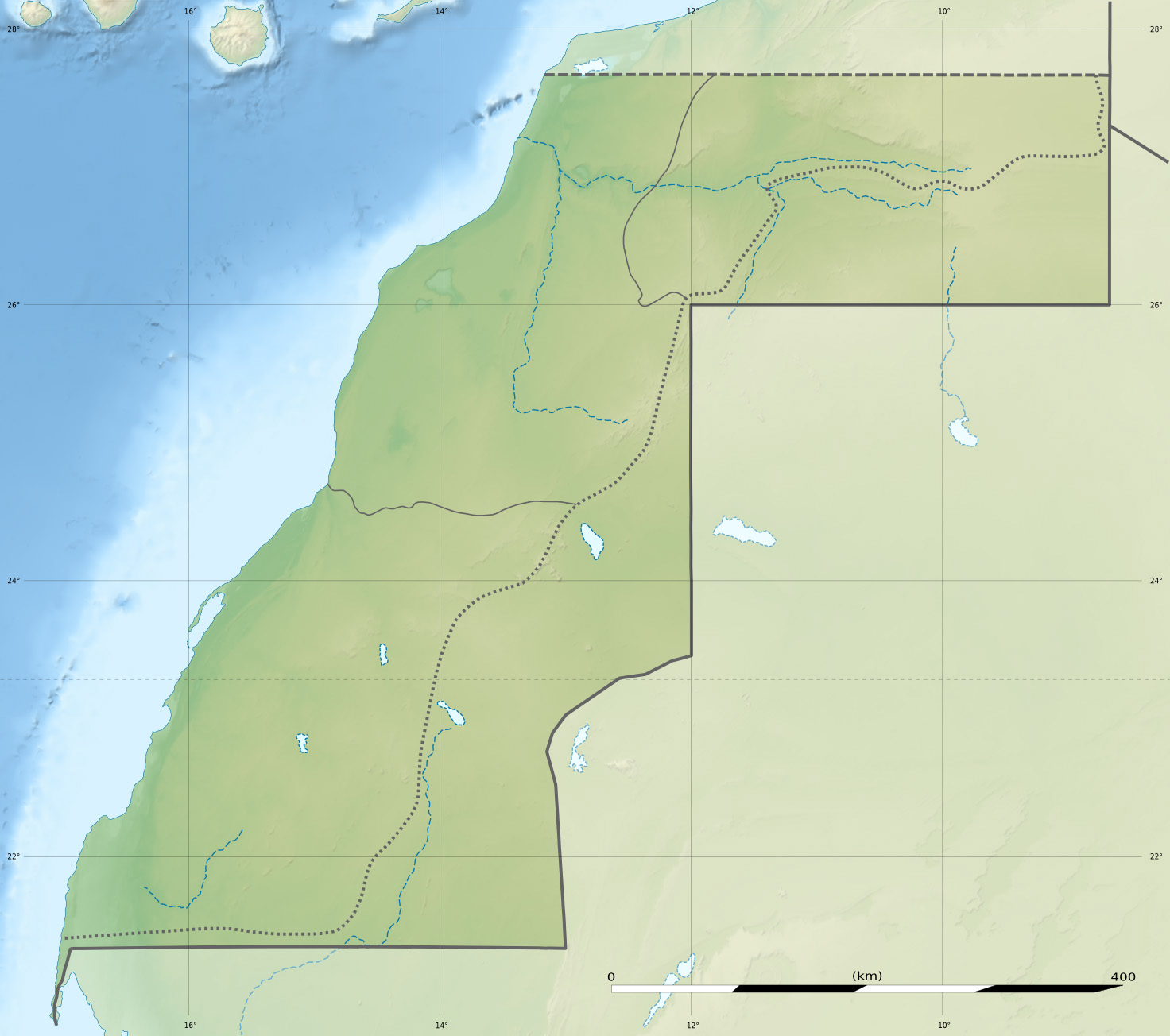
- Location within Western Sahara
- Coordinates: 25.4441°N 14.7653°W
- Non-self-governing territory: Western Sahara
- Claimed by: Morocco; Sahrawi Republic
- Controlled by: Morocco
- Region: Laâyoune-Sakia El Hamra
- Province: Boujdour
- Time zone: UTC+0 (GMT)

Zaouiat Ahmed Ben Yaddas (Arabic: زاوية أحمد بن يداس) is a religious site in Moroccan-occupied Western Sahara.

== Location ==
Zaouiat Ahmed Ben Yaddas is in Boujdour Province, in the Laâyoune-Sakia El Hamra region. It is on the Atlantic coast about 20 kilometres (12 mi) south of Aftissat. It is 84 kilometres (52 mi) south of Boujdour on the coast road that leads to Dakhla.

== Religious ceremonies ==
The site is named after the Maliki leader Ahmed bin Yidas, born in the year 1191 to the Awlad Tadrarine tribe. The Zaouiat Ahmed Ben Yaddas is considered one of the most ancient and most important zaouiats in the desert region. The Ahmed bin Yidas Association for Social, Cultural and Educational Development arranges three-day religious ceremonies at Zaouiat Ahmed Ben Yaddas each year, assisted by the tribe of Ouled Tidrarin Fakhda al-Yidadas.

== Sources ==
- "اليدادسة ينظمون النسخة الحادية عشر لموسم جدهم أحمد بن يداس بمنطقة الترتار جنوب بوجدور .", Dakhla TV (in Arabic), 5 April 2019
- Hussein Adraq (6 April 2019), "عامل إقليم بوجدور يزورالموسم الديني أحمد بن يداس في نسخته الحادية عشر", الوطنية بريس (in Arabic), archived from the original on 2021-10-21
- "Lundi 26 / 12 / 2011", Tenor en Afrique (in French), archived from the original on 2021-10-21
- "Node: Zaouiat Ahmed Ben Yaddas (5299764114)", OpenStreetMap
