= Agti el Ghazi =

Agti el Ghazi أغتي الغازي (Arabic) Hasi Hatas (Spanish)
- Village
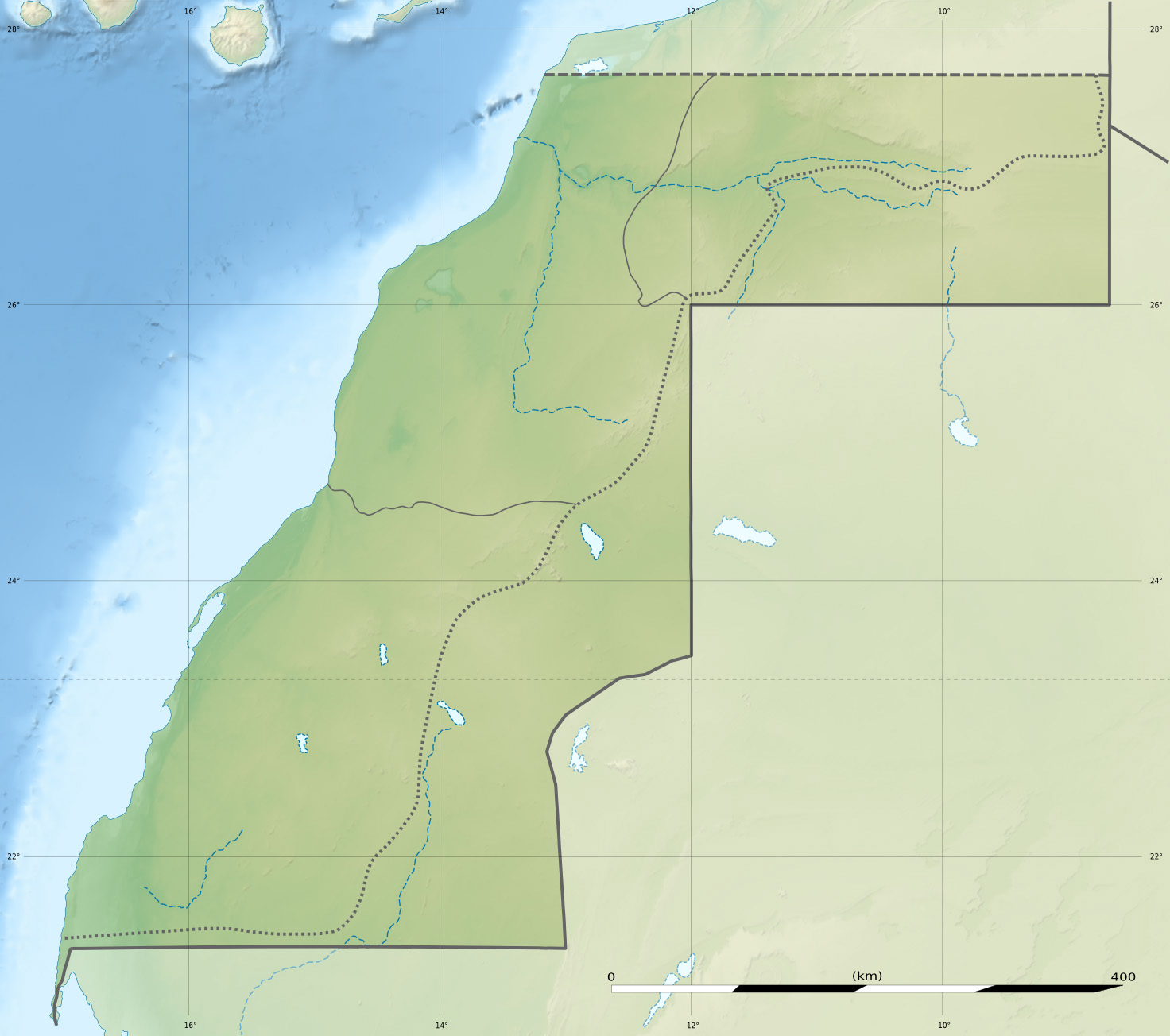
- Location within Western Sahara
- Coordinates: 26.3839°N 14.2027°W
- Non-self-governing territory: Western Sahara
- Claimed by: Morocco; Sahrawi Republic
- Controlled by: Morocco
- Region: Laâyoune-Sakia El Hamra
- Province: Boujdour Province
- Rural commune: Lemseid
- Time zone: UTC+0 (GMT)

Agti el Ghazi (Arabic: أغتي الغازي; Spanish: Hasi Hatas) is a fishing village in the commune of Lemseid, Boujdour Province, Laâyoune-Sakia El Hamra region, Moroccan-occupied Western Sahara.

== Location ==
Agti el Ghazi is on the Atlantic coast in Boujdour Province of the Western Sahara. The village is 2 kilometres (1.2 mi) from National Road No. 1, in the section that links the cities of Boujdour and Laayoune, 46 kilometres (29 mi) northeast of Boujdour. It belongs to the Lemseid commune in the Boujdour province of the Laayoune-Sakia El Hamra region.

== Origins ==
The village of Agti el Ghazi was established in 2005 as part of a development program of the Ministry of Agriculture and Fisheries, aimed at establishing fishermen's villages and equipped ports along the Moroccan coast, in order to strengthen the marine fishing sector and revive traditional fishing. It is one of four fishing villages in the Boujdour province, the others being Lacraa, Aftissat (أفتيسات) and Port Boujdour (مٌناء بوجدور).

== Facilities and infrastructure ==
Avtisat has one fish market, 10 stores for fish trading and 100 stores for sailors, as well as a box store, a gasoline store and an engine repair workshop. The village has 635 boats for traditional fishing.

== Sources ==
- Annuaire Statistique Regional Laayoune - Sakia el Hamra (in French), Rotaume de Maric Haut-Commissariat au Plan, 2015
- "Node: Agti El Ghazi (2801310265)", OpenStreetMap
- "Provinces du Sud Le programme villages de pêche bien avancé", L'Économiste (3472), 23 February 2011
