= Côte Aftissate-Boujdour =

Ramsar site in Western Sahara

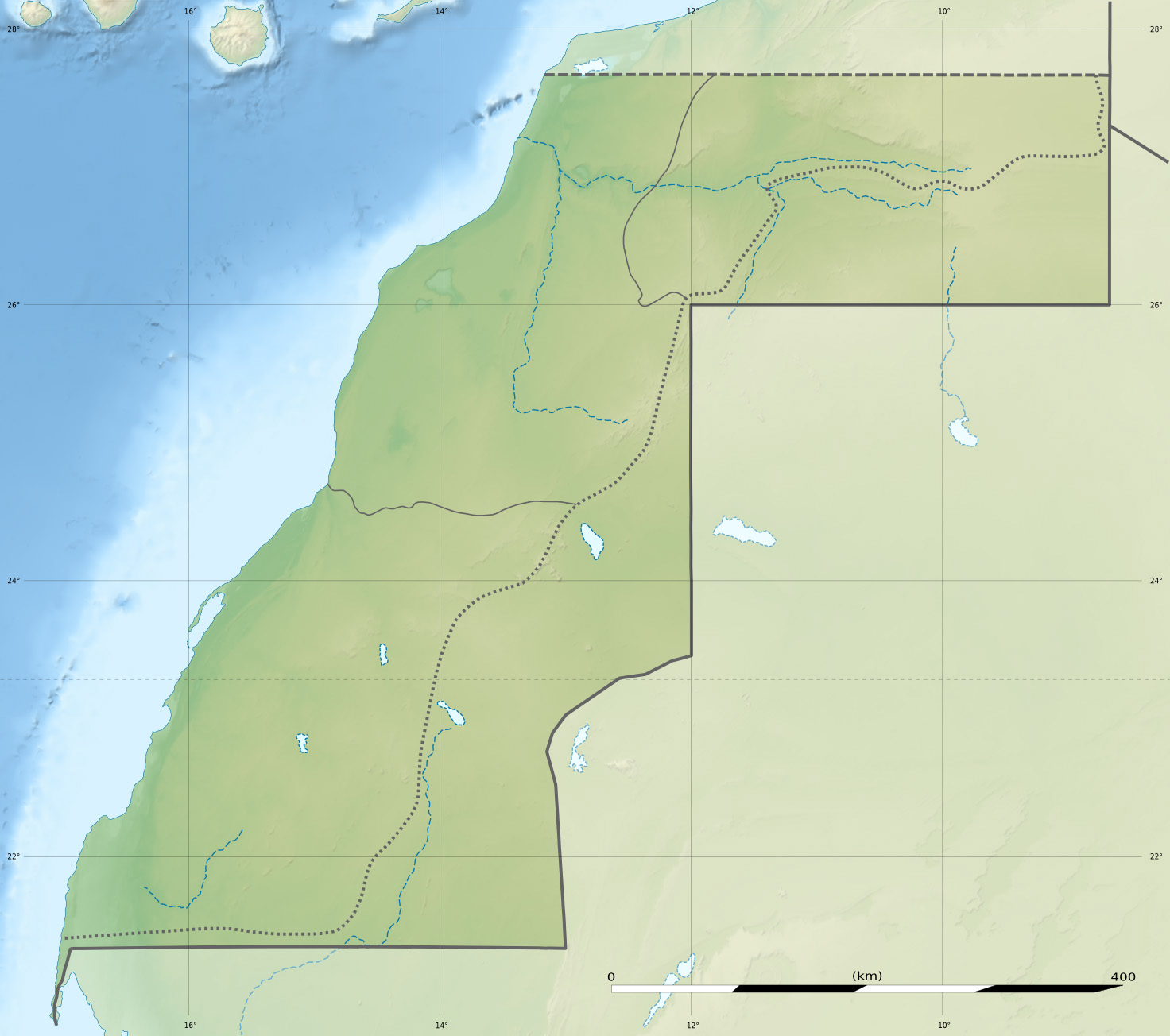
- Location within Western Sahara
- Coordinates: 25°48′N 14°35′W
- Area: 11,700 ha (45 sq mi)
- Designation: Ramsar site, Wetland of International Importance
- Designated: 16 April 2019

The Côte Aftissate-Boujdour is a Ramsar site that stretches along 50 kilometres (31 mi) of the Western Sahara coast south of Boujdour. It includes the fishing village of Aftissat.

== Location ==
The Côte Aftissate-Boujdour is located in Jraifia commune, Boujdour Province in the Laâyoune-Sakia El Hamra region. The protected area covers 117 square kilometres (45 sq mi). It extends along the Atlantic coast for 50 kilometres (31 mi). The site was designated on 16 April 2019. Along this section of the coast a beach and mobile dunes separate the sea from a continuous low-lying furrow of land below a 70 metres (230 ft) high sea cliff.

== Ecology ==
The Côte Aftissate-Boujdour is at the southern edge of the Palearctic ecozone. The climate is strongly influenced by coastal upwelling. The wetland is a resting area for Palearctic seabirds, waders and land migrants, and for passerines in particular. Over 1% of the biogeographic population of species such as the lesser black-backed gull (Larus fuscus) are found in the wetland in winter. The dry area is home to the endemic gecko Saurodactylus brosseti and other rare and endemic species.

== Sources ==
- "Côte Aftissate-Boujdour", Protected Planet
- "Côte Aftissate-Boujdour", Ramsar Sites Information Service
- "Twelve new Ramsar sites for Morocco", Smart Water Magazine, 3 September 2019
