= List of shipwrecks in February 1889 =

The list of shipwrecks in February 1889 includes ships sunk, foundered, grounded, or otherwise lost during February 1889.

== 1 February ==
List of shipwrecks: 1 February 1889
Ship	State	Description
Dilbhur	United Kingdom	The barque capsized at Hartlepool, County Durham with the loss of one life.

== 2 February ==
List of shipwrecks: 2 February 1889
Ship	State	Description
Bonnie Lass	United Kingdom	The schooner was abandoned off Scrabster, Caithness. Her four crew were rescued by the Thurso Lifeboat Charley Lloyd ( Royal National Lifeboat Institution).
Hardengeren	Norway	The ship was abandoned in the North Sea 35 nautical miles (65 km) off Flamborough Head, Yorkshire, United Kingdom. Her crew were rescued by the smack James (United Kingdom). Hardengeren was on a voyage from London to Leith, Lothian, United Kingdom.
Lymington	United Kingdom	The steamship was wrecked off Ilfracombe, Devon with the loss of all eight crew. She was on a voyage from Swansea, Glamorgan to Mistley, Essex.
Roseneath	United Kingdom	The barque was wrecked at Portpatrick, Wigtownshire She was on a voyage from Dublin for the Clyde in tow of tug Defiance (United Kingdom) and with a reduced crew and two passengers. In a gale, after the tug's towing connection failed; Roseneath made for Portpatrick harbour but missed the entrance, drifted ashore on the tide, keeled over and became a total wreck. Six of the eleven people on board lost their lives, while the survivors were rescued by coastguard rocket apparatus.

== 3 February ==
List of shipwrecks: 3 February 1889
Ship	State	Description
Acorn	United Kingdom	The schooner was driven ashore at Kingscross, Isle of Arran and was subsequently destroyed by fire. Her crew survived. She was on a voyage from Glenarm, County Antrim to Irvine, Ayrshire.
Cameo	United Kingdom	The steamship was driven ashore at Portreath, Cornwall.
Caskey	United Kingdom	The schooner foundered in Lamlash Bay. Her crew were rescued.
Garibaldi	France	The lugger collided with another vessel off Bridlington, Yorkshire, United Kingdom and was abandoned. Her five crew were rescued by the Bridlington Lifeboat William and John Francis ( Royal National Lifeboat Institution).
Georgia B. McFarland	United States	The schooner, bound for Trinidad from Fernandina, Florida, with timber, began sinking after having decks swept and being dismasted in a storm. On 10 February, the crew of seven were rescued from the cabin top by the ship-rigged Canute ( (United Kingdom of Great Britain and Ireland) ) and landed at Bristol, England, on 8 March.
Killochan, and Nereid	United Kingdom	The full-rigged ship Killochan collided with the steamship Nereid in the English Channel off Beachy Head, Sussex. Both vessels sank. Killochan was on a voyage from Lyttelton, New Zealand to London. Seventeen of her 25 crew were lost. Survivors were rescued by the tugs Enterprise and Red Rose (both United Kingdom). Nereid was on a voyage from Newcastle upon Tyne, Northumberland to Saint Nazaire, Ille-et-Vilaine, France. She lost six of her seventeen crew. Survivors were rescued by Red Rose.
Maria	United Kingdom	The ship was driven ashore at Greenock, Renfrewshire.
Tweed	United Kingdom	The steamship sprang a severe leak in the River Tyne. She was kept afloat with the assistance of a tug.
Unnamed	United Kingdom	The dandy was driven ashore at Dymchurch, Kent.
Unnamed	Flag unknown	The steamship was driven ashore north of Newbiggin Point, Northumberland.

== 4 February ==
List of shipwrecks: 4 February 1889
Ship	State	Description
Alert	United Kingdom	The schooner was wrecked at Blyth, Northumberland with the loss of one of her four crew. She was on a voyage from Montrose, Forfarshire to Southampton, Hampshire.
Deux Cousinez	France	The ship was driven ashore at Saint-Jean-de-Luz, Basses-Pyrénées.
Forest King	United Kingdom	The steamship ran aground on the Goodwin Sands, Kent.
Glencoe	United Kingdom	The steamship Glencoe was in collision with the barque Largo Bay (United Kingdom) in the English Channel off Beachy Head, Sussex. Glencoe sank with the loss of all 52 people on board. She was on a voyage from Liverpool, Lancashire to London. Largo Bay was severely damaged with the loss of a crew member. She was on a voyage from London to Auckland, New Zealand, and was later repaired at Southampton.
Nictot	Germany	The schooner was abandoned in the North Sea 50 nautical miles (93 km) north east of the Galloper Sand. Her eight crew survived. She was on a voyage from Hartlepool, County Durham to Portsmouth, Hampshire.
R. & M.	United Kingdom	The steamship was driven ashore at Grainthorpe, Lincolnshire.
Westfalia	United Kingdom	The steamship was run ashore at San Vicente de la Barquera, Spain with the loss of three of her crew. She was on a voyage from Huelva, Spain to Garston, Lancashire.
Unnamed	Flag unknown	The ship ran aground on the Goodwin Sands, Kent. Her crew were rescued.
Unnamed	Flag unknown	The steamship was driven ashore at Grainthorpe, Lincolnshire.

== 5 February ==
List of shipwrecks: 5 February 1889
Ship	State	Description
Fannie Belle	United States	The schooner was wrecked at Langley Head, Miquelon Island. Her crew were rescued.
Leda	Germany	The steamship sprang a leak and sank in the North Sea. Her crew were rescued by the steamship Equity (United Kingdom). Leda was on a voyage from Geestemünde to Odesa, Russia.
Montmorency	United Kingdom	The ship partially sank at Appledore, Devon and was severely damaged. She was on a voyage from Newport, Monmouthshire to Appledore.

== 6 February ==
List of shipwrecks: 6 February 1889
Ship	State	Description
Active	United Kingdom	The ship departed from Port Seton for London with potatoes. No further trace, posted missing et Lloyd's 17 April.
Esme	United Kingdom	The steamship was wrecked on the Salvage Rocks, off Cape Negro, Nova Scotia, Canada. She was on a voyage from the River Tyne to Annapolis, Nova Scotia.

== 7 February ==
List of shipwrecks: 7 February 1889
Ship	State	Description
Gazelle	United Kingdom	The steamship ran aground at Llanelly, Glamorgan. She was on a voyage from Llanelly to Dieppe, Seine-Inférieure, France.
Juno	Norway	The brig sprang a leak and sank in the North Sea 220 nautical miles (410 km) east north east of Spurn Point, Yorkshire, United Kingdom. Her eight crew were rescued by the smack Fawn (United Kingdom). Juno was on a voyage from Blyth, Northumberland, United Kingdom to Christiania.
Princesse Josephine	Belgium	The steamer ran aground and was wrecked off the coast of Algeria.

== 8 February ==
List of shipwrecks: 8 February 1889
Ship	State	Description
Calvilla	United Kingdom	The steamship was driven ashore and sank on the Salvoreef, off Gotland, Sweden.
Elizabeth and Jane	United Kingdom	The smack foundered in the North Sea 55 nautical miles (102 km) off Spurn Head, Yorkshire. Her crew were rescued by the smack Amateur (United Kingdom).
Enterprise	United Kingdom	The schooner was driven ashore at Penrhos, Anglesey. Her four crew were rescued by the Holyhead Lifeboat. She was on a voyage from Newry, County Down to Port Dinorwic, Caernarfonshire.
Ethel	United Kingdom	The schooner was wrecked on the Goodwin Sands, Kent. Her six crew were rescued by the Ramsgate Lifeboat. She was on a voyage from Newhaven, Sussex to Sunderland, County Durham.
Glen Grant	United Kingdom	The barque was driven ashore and wrecked at Holyhead, Anglesey. Her crew were rescued by rocket apparatus. She was on a voyage from Pensacola, Florida, United States to Holyhead.
Mary	United Kingdom	The schooner was driven ashore at Sairdyness, Forfarshire. Her crew were rescued by the Montrose Lifeboat. Mary was on a voyage from Methil, Fife to Lerwick, Shetland Islands. She subsequently broke up.
Trio	United Kingdom	The smack was disabled in the North Sea 50 nautical miles (93 km) off Spurn Head. She was towed in to Grimsby by the smack Silvery Spray (United Kingdom) on 11 February.
Two unnamed vessels	Flags unknown	Fishermen at Ballycastle, County Antrim claimed that two steamships disappeared off the Mull of Kintyre, Argyllshire in a squall. Unconfirmed.

== 9 February ==
List of shipwrecks: 9 February 1889
Ship	State	Description
Annie	United States	The schooner departed from San Francisco, California bound for Unalaska, District of Alaska and was never seen or heard from again. Her entire crew of eleven was lost.
Antelope	United Kingdom	The smack was disabled in the North Sea. She was towed in to Grimsby, Lincolnshire on 12 February.
Argus	Norway	The schooner was disabled in the North Sea 100 nautical miles (190 km) off Spurn Point. She was on a voyage from Guernsey, Channel Islands to Leith, Lothian, United Kingdom. She was towed in to Grimsby by the smack Polly and Minnie (United Kingdom) on 12 February.
Arthur	United Kingdom	The ship was wrecked on the Hale Sands, in the North Sea off the coast of Lincolnshire. Her crew were rescued by the Spurn Lifeboat.
Augwina	United Kingdom	The smack was disabled in the North Sea 150 nautical miles (280 km) off Spurn Point with the loss of a crew member. She was towed in to Grimsby by the smack Resolution (United Kingdom) on 14 February.
Ben Avon	United Kingdom	The barque was driven ashore at Scheveningen, South Holland, Netherlands. Her crew were rescued by the Scheveningen Lifeboat. She was on a voyage from Hamburg, Germany to Sydney, New South Wales. She was refloated on 17 March and towed in to IJmuiden, North Holland, Netherlands.
Blue Ribbon	United Kingdom	The smack was disabled in the North Sea. She was towed in to Grimsby on 12 February.
Boatswain	(United Kingdom of Great Britain and Ireland) Guernsey	The brig was disabled in the North Sea 8 nautical miles (15 km) off Bridlington, Yorkshire. Two of her crew were severely injured. She was on a voyage from South Shields, County Durham to Devonport, Devon. She was towed in to Grimsby by the smack Unity (United Kingdom) on 12 February.
Britannia	United Kingdom	The smack was disabled in the North Sea 140 nautical miles (260 km) off Spurn Point. She was towed in to Grimsby by the smack William Butt (United Kingdom) on 12 February.
Britannia	United Kingdom	The smack was disabled in the North Sea. She was towed in to Hull, Yorkshire on 12 February.
British Lion	United Kingdom	The smack was driven ashore south of Cleethorpes, Lincolnshire.
British Workman, Contrast; Danish Prince, Eton, Good Design, Harold, James and Ellen, John Winteringham, Kitten, Searcher, Sea Searcher, Sir Frederick Roberts, Toilers of the Sea, Yorkshire Lass	United Kingdom	Sixteen smacks from Grimsby, Lincolnshire were reported lost in a gale with the loss of c. 70 lives. Spy, which had been reported lost, eventually put in to Scarborough. British Tar, which had been reported lost, arrived at Grimsby in late February or early March.
Charles H. Spurgeon	United Kingdom	The smack was disabled in the North Sea with the loss of two of her crew. She was taken in tow by the smack John and Ann (United Kingdom) and arrived at Grimsby on 13 February.
Choice	United Kingdom	The smack was disabled in the North Sea. She was towed in to Hull on 12 February.
Clio	United Kingdom	The smack was disabled in the North Sea 60 nautical miles (110 km) off Spurn Point. She was towed in by the smack Young Joe (United Kingdom). She was towed into Grimsby by the tug United (United Kingdom) on 12 February.
Docea	United Kingdom	The smack was disabled in the North Sea 50 nautical miles (93 km) off Spurn Point. She was towed in to Grimsby by the smack Fawn (United Kingdom) on 12 February.
Fiery Cross	United Kingdom	The smack was disabled in the North Sea. She put in to Scarborough, Yorkshire on 12 February.
Gothur	United Kingdom	The ship ran aground on the Grimsby Sand and sank. Her crew were rescued by the Spurn Lifeboat.
Harvest Home	United Kingdom	The schooner ran aground at Cardigan. Her four crew were rescued by the Cardigan Lifeboat Lizzie & Charles Leigh Clare ( Royal National Lifeboat Institution). Harvest Home was on a voyage from Fowey, Cornwall to Runcorn, Cheshire. She was refloated on 13 February and taken in to Pwllcam, Cardiganshire.
Iphigenia	Denmark	The brigantine was wrecked on the Hale Sands, in the North Sea off the coast of Lincolnshire with the loss of all hands. She was on a voyage from Hull, Yorkshire, United Kingdom to Rønne.
Island	United Kingdom	The smack was run into by the steamship Diadem (United Kingdom) and sank in the Bristol Channel 26 nautical miles (48 km) west of Lundy Island, Devon with the loss of three of her five crew. Survivors were rescued by Diadem.
James Thorpe	United Kingdom	The smack was abandoned in the North Sea 110 nautical miles (200 km) off Spurn Point in a sinking condition. Her crew were rescued by the smack Annie Williamson (United Kingdom).
Leading Star	United Kingdom	The smack was disabled in the North Sea. She put in to Scarborough on 12 February.
Neva	United Kingdom	The smack was driven ashore south of Cleethorpes, Lincolnshire.
Nicholaos	Greece	The barque was driven ashore at Mersin, Ottoman Empire. She became a wreck on 11 February.
Presto	Norway	The brig foundered in the North Sea. Her crew were rescued by the smack Titania (United Kingdom). Presto was on a voyage from South Shields, County Durham, United Kingdom to Stavanger.
Sir Francis Crossley	United Kingdom	The smack was disabled in the North Sea. She put in to Scarborough on 12 February.
Spearman	United Kingdom	The steamship was run into by the steamship Monkseaton (United Kingdom) and sank in the Tagus.
Standard	United States	The full-rigged ship ran aground in the River Mersey. She was on a voyage from Liverpool, Lancashire, United Kingdom to Philadelphia, Pennsylvania and was refloated with the assistance of two tugs.
Star of Montrose	United Kingdom	The schooner was abandoned off St. Abb's Head, Berwickshire. Her crew were rescued by the steamship Florence (United Kingdom). Star of Montrose was on a voyage from Montrose, Forfarshire to Sunderland, County Durham.
Union	United Kingdom	The schooner foundered off Lady Isle, Ayrshire with the loss of all four crew.
Violent	United Kingdom	The smack was disabled in the North Sea. She was towed in to Hull on 12 February.
Wellesley	United Kingdom	The smack was disabled in the North Sea. She put in to Scarborough on 12 February.
Unnamed	United Kingdom	The sloop was driven ashore at Grainthorpe, Lincolnshire.
Two unnamed vessels	United Kingdom	The sloops were driven ashore north of Grimsby.
Unnamed	United Kingdom	The smack foundered in the North Sea 140 nautical miles (260 km) north east of Spurn Point with the loss of all hands.
unnamed	United Kingdom	The ferryboat capsized at Bentlass, Pembrokeshire with the loss of seven lives.

== 10 February ==
List of shipwrecks: 10 February 1889
Ship	State	Description
Carl Rosenius	Norway	The ship was driven ashore at Littlestone-on-Sea, Kent, United Kingdom. Her crew were rescued by the Folkestone Lifeboat. She was on a voyage from Haugesund to Cardiff, Glamorgan, United Kingdom. She was refloated on 12 January and towed in to Dover, Kent.
Clarissa	United Kingdom	The brig was driven ashore near Sizewell, Suffolk. Her crew survived.
Eagle	United Kingdom	The brigantine was driven ashore and wrecked at Black Head, Wigtownshire. Her crew survived. She was on a voyage from Belfast, County Antrim to Ayr.
Elizabeth Alice	United Kingdom	The barque was driven ashore at Dungeness, Kent with the loss of a crew member and a member of the Coastguard attempting to rescue her crew. She was on a voyage from London to Maryport, Cumberland.
Heroine	United Kingdom	The steam trawler foundered in the North Sea 65 nautical miles (120 km) off Spurn Point, Yorkshire with the loss of one of her three crew. The survivors were rescued by the smack Liberator (United Kingdom).
Patrick	(United Kingdom of Great Britain and Ireland) Isle of Man	The smack was abandoned in Ramsey Bay. Her four crew were rescued by the Ramsey Lifeboat Mary Isabella ( Royal National Lifeboat Institution). Patrick was on a voyage from Whitehaven, Cumberland to Killough, County Down.

== 11 February ==
List of shipwrecks: 11 February 1889
Ship	State	Description
Jean Bart	France	The barque was driven ashore at "Schoon" and was wrecked. Her crew were rescued. She was on a voyage from Antwerp, Belgium to Sunderland, County Durham, United Kingdom.
Leonidas	United Kingdom	The barque was wrecked on the Goodwin Sands, Kent. Her fourteen crew were rescued by the lugger Hope (United Kingdom). Leonidas was on a voyage from South Shields, County Durham to Motril, Spain.
Nyanza	United Kingdom	The smack was damaged in the North Sea with the loss of a crew member. She was towed in to Grimsby, Lincolnshire by the smack Champion (United Kingdom).
Snowdrop	United Kingdom	The smack was disabled in the North Sea. She was towed in to Grimsby by the tug Champion (United Kingdom).

== 12 February ==
List of shipwrecks: 12 February 1889
Ship	State	Description
Christine	Netherlands	The fishing boat from Den Helder was wrecked at Kallantsoog. Two people were killed.
Glendoveer	United Kingdom	The schooner was towed in to Padstow, Cornwall by the steamship Empress of India (United Kingdom). Glendoveer ran aground on the Doom Bar and sprang a leak. She was on a voyage from Glasgow, Renfrewshire to Calstock, Cornwall.
Goldsbro	United Kingdom	The steamer was wrecked at Kijkduin. Her crew were rescued. Goldsbro was on a voyage from Antwerp, Belgium to West-Hartlepool.
St. Clair	United Kingdom	The steamship was damaged by fire at Leith, Lothian.

== 13 February ==
List of shipwrecks: 13 February 1889
Ship	State	Description
Chase	United Kingdom	The ship was driven ashore at Dungeness, Kent. She was on a voyage from Rochester, Kent to Ardrossan, Ayrshire. She was refloated on 17 February and put in to Newhaven, Sussex in a leaky condition.
Ellington	United Kingdom	The steamship ran aground at Hayle, Cornwall.
Unnamed	United Kingdom	The coble capsized at Bridlington, Yorkshire. Her three crew survived.

== 14 February ==
List of shipwrecks: 14 February 1889
Ship	State	Description
South Australian	United Kingdom	The clipper foundered in the Bristol Channel off Lundy Island, Devon with the loss of a crew member. She was on a voyage from Cardiff, Glamorgan to Rosario, Argentina.

== 15 February ==
List of shipwrecks: 15 February 1889
Ship	State	Description
Amelia	United Kingdom	The ship departed from Dunkirk, Nord, France for London. No further trace, reported overdue.
Sentinelle	French Navy	The dispatch boat ran aground between Cap Rosa and La Calle, Algeria. Her crew were rescued.

== 16 February ==
List of shipwrecks: 16 February 1889
Ship	State	Description
Rose	United Kingdom	The steamship struck the pier when departing Marseille for Cartagena and consequently foundered a few miles offshore with the loss of her captain.

== 17 February ==
List of shipwrecks: 17 February 1889
Ship	State	Description
Ann	United Kingdom	The ketch foundered in the North Sea off Wells-next-the-Sea, Norfolk. Her crew were rescued. She was on a voyage from South Shields, County Durham to Rye, Sussex.
HMS Cumberland	Royal Navy	The training ship, a former ship-of-the-line, was destroyed by fire in the Gareloch.
St. Luce	United Kingdom	The barquentine was abandoned in the Atlantic Ocean (42°24′N 54°20′W). Her crew were rescued by the steamship British Princess (United States).

== 18 February ==
List of shipwrecks: 18 February 1889
Ship	State	Description
Mary Sproat	United Kingdom	The schooner was run into by the steamship Strathspey and sank at Moville, County Donegal. Her crew were rescued. Mary Sproat was on a voyage from Cardiff, Glamorgan to Sligo.

== 19 February ==
List of shipwrecks: 19 February 1889
Ship	State	Description
Captain Maclure, and Oscar and Albert	United Kingdom; Russia	The steamship Captain Maclure and the barque Oscar and Albert collided in the Bristol Channel and were both severely damaged. Captain Maclure put in to Newport, Monmouthshire. Oscar and Albert put in to Cardiff, Glamorgan.
Fernando	United Kingdom	The steamship collided with the steamship London (United Kingdom) in the River Thames at Woolwich, Kent and was beached at Charlton, Kent.
Hickman	United Kingdom	The schooner collided with a steamship in the River Thames at Woolwich and was severely damaged. She was beached.
Jean Augustine	France	The fishing smack collided with the barque Actie (Norway) and sank off the Goodwin Sands, Kent with the loss of two of her seven crew. Survivors were rescued by Actie.

== 20 February ==
List of shipwrecks: 20 February 1889
Ship	State	Description
Cleadon, Harraton, and Kelloe	United Kingdom	The steamships Cleaton and Kelloe collided in the River Thames at Greenwich, Kent and were both severely damaged. Kelloe ran into the steamship Harraton which was damaged and beached at Plaistow, Essex.
William Hunter	United Kingdom	The steamship ran aground on the Blyth Sands, in the North Sea off the coast of Northumberland.

== 21 February ==
List of shipwrecks: 21 February 1889
Ship	State	Description
Verbena	United Kingdom	The Lowestoft fishing dandy grounded on the Goodwin Sands and the crew of eight abandoned the vessel.

== 22 February ==
List of shipwrecks: 22 February 1889
Ship	State	Description
Ceylon	United Kingdom	The steam yacht ran aground at Gibraltar. She was on a voyage from London to Gibraltar. She was refloated. She was refloated.
Josie Troop	Canada	The barque was stranded, due to poor navigation, off Hatteras Island, North Carolina in heavy weather and broke up, with the loss of her captain and ten of her crew; her 1st mate and five crew were rescued by the men of the Chicamacomico Life-Saving Station. She was on a voyage from London to Philadelphia, Pennsylvania, United States, with chalk.
Nellie	Norway	The steamship struck the quayside departing from Bo'ness, Lothian, United Kingdom for Bergen, driving her anchor through her bow. She was beached.

== 23 February ==
List of shipwrecks: 23 February 1889
Ship	State	Description
Elm	United Kingdom	The steamship was driven ashore at Inishowen Head, County Donegal. She was refloated and put in to Portrush, County Antrim in a leaky condition.
Margaret Traill	United Kingdom	The schooner was severely damaged by fire at South Shields, County Durham.
Nero	United Kingdom	The steamship caught fire at Hull, Yorkshire.
Tjomo	Norway	The barque collided with the steamship Oldenberg (Flag unknown) off the North Foreland, Kent, United Kingdom and was abandoned by all but two of her crew. Tjomo was on a voyage from Savannah, Georgia, United States to Newcastle upon Tyne, Northumberland, United Kingdom. She was subsequently towed in to Ramsgate, Kent by the tug Lady Vita (United Kingdom). Following temporary repairs, she departed for Newcastle upon Tyne on 4 March under tow of the tug Zealandia (United Kingdom).

== 24 February ==
List of shipwrecks: 24 February 1889
Ship	State	Description
Bottle Imp	United Kingdom	The sloop was run into by the steamship John Wells (United Kingdom) and sank in the River Ouse near Goole, Yorkshire. Her crew survived. Bottle Imp was on a voyage from Hessle to Goole.
Franziska	Germany	The steamship collided with the barque Honor (Norway) in the English Channel 19 nautical miles (35 km) south of Portland, Dorset, United Kingdom. Franziska was taken in tow by the steamship Minnie (United Kingdom) but sank 15 nautical miles (28 km) south of Portland. Her crew were rescued. Franziska was on a voyage from Cardiff, Glamorgan to Vlissingen, Zeeland, Netherlands.
Granville, and Progress	United Kingdom	The steamship Granville collided with another vessel in the English Channel and was damaged. She was on a voyage from South Shields, County Durham to Malta. She put in to Dover, Kent, where she collided with the steamship Progress, which was severely damaged.

== 26 February ==
List of shipwrecks: 26 February 1889
Ship	State	Description
Clyde	United States	The schooner was wrecked at Gerring Island, Kittery, Maine. Her crew were rescued.

== 27 February ==
List of shipwrecks: 27 February 1889
Ship	State	Description
Ane Kjerstine	Denmark	The schooner was driven ashore and wrecked at Safi, Morocco. Her crew were rescued.
Columbus	United Kingdom	The ship was wrecked at Vlissingen, Zeeland, Netherlands. She was on a voyage from Fredrikstadt, Norway to Penzance, Cornwall.
Faerheit	Germany	The schooner was driven ashore and wrecked at Safi. Her crew were rescued.
Lina	Germany	The schooner was driven ashore and wrecked at Safi. Her crew were rescued.
Margaret Hain	United Kingdom	The brig was driven ashore and wrecked at Safi. Her crew were rescued.
Port Gordon	United Kingdom	The barque was lost 40 nautical miles (74 km) south of Cape Flattery, Washington, United States with the loss of four of her crew. Survivors were rescued by breeches buoy. She was on a voyage from Ardrossan, Ayrshire to Tacoma, Washington.

== 28 February ==
List of shipwrecks: 28 February 1889
Ship	State	Description
Pollie Williams	United Kingdom	The schooner was run into by the steamship Telephone (United Kingdom) and sank in the Crosby Channel with the loss of her captain. Her mate was rescued by Telephone. Pollie Williams was on a voyage from Ulverston, Lancashire to Ellesmere Port, Cheshire.

== Unknown date ==
List of shipwrecks: Unknown date in February 1889
Ship	State	Description
Africa	United Kingdom	The ship was driven ashore at Bahía Blanca, Argentina. She was refloated.
Ajax	Denmark	The steamship was driven ashore on the south coast of Lolland. She was refloated with assistance from a steamship and taken in to Copenhagen.
Alexandra	United Kingdom	The brig was driven ashore in Widewall Bay.
Alicia	Spain	The steamship was damaged by fire at New Orleans, Louisiana, United States.
Anglo-Indian	United Kingdom	The steamer was wrecked off Formosa with the loss of the fourteen crew.
Annie	United Kingdom	The smack collided with the Bull Lightship ( Trinity House) and sank. Her crew were rescued.
Arietta Zigemala	Flag unknown	The ship was driven ashore at Mağala, Ottoman Empire. She was on a voyage from Marseille, Bouches-du-Rhône, France to Taganrog, Russia.
Atalanta	Sweden	The ship was driven ashore. She was refloated and taken in to the Seine.
Badsworth	United Kingdom	The steamship ran aground on the Tringir Bozan Shoal, off Gallipoli, Ottoman Empire. She was on a voyage from Batoum, Russia to Shanghai, China. She was refloated on 12 February and taken in to Gallipoli.
Betty Sauber	Germany	The steamship ran aground in the Elbe. She was on a voyage from Sunderland, County Durham, United Kingdom to Hamburg.
Bradford, and Pride of the West	United Kingdom	The steamship Bradford collided with the schooner Pride of the West at Maassluis, South Holland, Netherlands and was beached. She was on a voyage from Rotterdam, South Holland to Grimsby, Lincolnshire. Pride of the West sank. She was on a voyage from Charlestown, Cornwall to Rotterdam.
Busy Bee, and Conde Wilfredo	United Kingdom; Spain	The steamship Busy Bee ran into the steamship Conde Wilfredo at South Shields, County Durham. Both vessels were severely damaged.
Captain Peter Dahl	Norway	The barque was wrecked at Maldonado, Uruguay. Her crew were rescued.
Caravelle	France	The steamship sprang a leak in the Gironde and was beached. She was on a voyage from Bordeaux, Gironde to Lisbon, Portugal. She was refloated and towed back to Bordeaux for repairs.
Cavaliere Ivanissevich	Italy	The ship was lost in the Dry Tortugas. Her crew were rescued. She was on a voyage from Pensacola, Florida, United States to Venice.
Choice	United Kingdom	The ketch struck rocks and sank off the Isle of Arran. Her crew survived.
Clarissa	United Kingdom	The brig was driven ashore at Sizewell, Suffolk. Her crew survived. She was on a voyage from Sunderland to Southampton, Hampshire.
Conte Oscar L.	Flag unknown	The ship ran aground in the East River at New York, United States.
Dakar, and Faleme	Flags unknown	The ship collided off Goeree, Zeeland. Dakar sank, Faleme was severely damaged.
Dale	United Kingdom	The steamship was driven ashore in the Kerkennah Islands, Tunisia.
Dallam Tower	United Kingdom	The ship was driven ashore and wrecked at "Tandjong Kokko", Netherlands East Indies. She was on a voyage from Newcastle, New South Wales to Probolinggo, Netherlands East Indies.
Dijmphna	Denmark	The steamship was driven ashore at Höganäs, Sweden. She was on a voyage from Liepāja, Russia to Fredrikshavn. She was refloated and taken in to Helsingør in a leaky condition.
Dione	United Kingdom	The brig was abandoned at "Doutelande" in a waterlogged condition. Her crew were rescued by a tug. She was on a voyage from the River Tyne to Newhaven, Sussex.
Ebenezer	United Kingdom	The schooner ran aground on the Kentish Knock. She was refloated with assistance from the smack Emily (United Kingdom) and taken in to Harwich, Essex in a leaky condition.
Edith	United Kingdom	The schooner ran aground on the Goodwin Sands, Kent and was wrecked. Her crew were rescued by a lifeboat and a tug. She was on a voyage from Newhaven to South Shields.
Elsie	United Kingdom	The pilot boat was driven ashore and wrecked at Llantwit Major, Glamorgan. Her crew were rescued.
Erin	United Kingdom	The steamhip was abandoned at sea. All on board were rescued by the steamship Liscard (United Kingdom). Erin was on a voyage from Charlestown to Bremerhaven, Germany.
Fairport	United Kingdom	The steamship ran aground at the Weston Point Docks, Cheshire and broke her back.
Fred B. Taylor	Flag unknown	The ship was driven ashore at "Kannonsai", Japan. She subsequently became a wreck.
Freihandel	Flag unknown	The ship was driven ashore on Foulney Island, Lancashire, United Kingdom. She was on a voyage from Pascagoula, Mississippi, United States to Piel Island, Lancashire.
Gebroeders Smit	Flag unknown	The ship ran aground at Bermuda. She was refloated with assistance.
George Gilroy	United Kingdom	The ship was beached at Demerara, British Guiana. She subsequently became a wreck.
Goldsbro	United Kingdom	The steamship was driven ashore at Kijkduin, South Holland. Her crew were rescued. She was on a voyage from Antwerp, Belgium to Hartlepool, County Durham.
Gunesa	Flag unknown	The ship ran aground off the Île Jaire, Bouches-du-Rhône. She was on a voyage from Vyborg, Grand Duchy of Finland to Marseille.
Harald Haarfanger	United Kingdom	The steamship ran aground in the Elbe at Schulau, Germany. She was on a voyage from Odesa, Russia to Hamburg.
Holsatia	Germany	The steamship was damaged by ice and sank in the Elbe at Swinemünde.
Ingeborg	Russia	The barque was towed in to Christiania, Norway by the steam trawler Albatross (United Kingdom) in a waterlogged condition. Ingeborg was on a voyage from Kristiansand, Norway to Antwerp.
Invermark	United Kingdom	The schooner was abandoned in the North Sea. Her crew were rescued by a smack. Invermark was on a voyage from London to Newcastle upon Tyne, Northumberland. She was subsequently towed in to Grimsby in a waterlogged condition.
Isabel	Spain	The schooner was run into by the steamship Scoresby (United Kingdom) and sank at Cartagena.
Iver Hvitfield	Denmark	The barque foundered off Dunkirk, Nord, France. Her crew were rescued. She was on a voyage from Grangemouth, Stirlingshire, United Kingdom to Granville, Manche, France.
James Cairns	United Kingdom	The barque was driven ashore at Jarrow, Northumberland.
Jeune Henry	France	The schooner sprang a leak and put in to Porto, Portugal, where she was beached. She was on a voyage from Lisbon to Tréguier, Côtes-du-Nord.
John	United Kingdom	The Yorkshire Billyboy sprang a leak and foundered in the North Sea off Lowestoft, Suffolk. Her crew were rescued by the smack Zealous (United Kingdom). John was on a voyage from Goole, Yorkshire to Gravesend, Kent.
John Coggin	United Kingdom	The brig was abandoned in the North Sea. Her crew were rescued by the steam trawler Teaser (United Kingdom). John Coggin was on a voyage from Great Yarmouth, Norfolk to the River Tyne.
Jupiter	Sweden	The barque was abandoned in the Atlantic Ocean. Her crew were rescued by the full-rigged ship Doris Brodersen (Denmark). Jupiter was on a voyage from Newport, Monmouthshire, United Kingdom to São Vicente, Cape Verde Islands.
Levant	United Kingdom	The schooner ran aground in the Scheldt. She was on a voyage from Dordrecht, South Holland to Newcastle upon Tyne.
Libbie H	United Kingdom	The brigantine was abandoned in the Atlantic Ocean with the loss of two of her crew. She was on a voyage from Halifax, Nova Scotia, Canada to Buenos Aires, Argentina.
Malta	United Kingdom	The steamship was driven ashore at Genoa, Italy. She was on a voyage from Genoa to Livorno, Italy. She was later refloated.
Mascotte	United Kingdom	The steamship was driven ashore in the River Duddon and broke her back.
Milton	Norway	The ship was wrecked on the Colorados, off the coast of Cuba. Her crew were rescued. She was on a voyage from Jamaica to Fleetwood, Lancashire.
Moravia	Flag unknown	The steamship ran aground in the Elbe at Schulau. She was on a voyage from New York to Hamburg.
Morning Star	United Kingdom	The schooner was driven ashore near Arbroath, Forfarshire. She was on a voyage from Carrickfergus, County Antrim to Perth. She was refloated on 7 December and taken in to Arbroath in a leaky condition.
Niclot	Germany	The schooner was abandoned in the North Sea 50 nautical miles (93 km) north east of the Galloper Sand. Her eight crew were rescued by the smack Granville (United Kingdom). Niclot was on a voyage from Hartlepool, County Durham to Portsmouth, Hampshire, United Kingdom.
Osauna	United Kingdom	The barque was driven ashore in the Savannah River.
Otto	United Kingdom	The schooner ran aground in the Elbe at "Nuelstack". She was on a voyage from Laguna to Hamburg.
Parænse	United Kingdom	The steamship ran aground at "Flynsknoll". She was on a voyage from New York to Brazil. She was refloated and put back to New York.
Provencal	France	The steamship was driven ashore at Maassluis, South Holland, Netherlands. She was on a voyage from Marseille to Rotterdam, South Holland. She subsequently broke in two.
Racer	United Kingdom	The ship was wrecked at Chania, Greece.
Rebekka	Norway	The barque was wrecked on the Chicho Bank. She was on a voyage from Sharpness, Gloucestershire, United Kingdom to Buenos Aires.
Remus	(Spain) Spanish East Indies	The steamship struck a rock off Biliran and foundered with loss of life.
Rolandseck	Germany	The steamship ran aground at Torekov, Sweden. She was on a voyage from Bremen to Liepāja. She was refloated in late March and towed in to Helsingør in a severely damaged condition.
Salacia	United Kingdom	The schooner was driven ashore and wrecked at Hunstanton, Norfolk. Her crew were rescued.
Scheldt	United Kingdom	The steamship ran aground in the Bec d'Ambès. She was refloated.
Scilla	United Kingdom	The steamship was damaged by fire at Liverpool, Lancashire.
Sorrento	Flag unknown	The steamship ran aground in the Suez Canal.
Sovereign	United Kingdom	The schooner collided with the barque Marin (France) and sank. Her crew were rescued by Marin.
Star	United Kingdom	The schooner was abandoned in the North Sea off St. Abbs Head, Berwickshire. Her crew were rescued by the steamship Florence (United Kingdom). Star was on a voyage from Montrose, Forfarshire to Sunderland.
Sumatra	United Kingdom	The steamship caught fire in the Mediterranean Sea in late February. She was on a voyage from Batoum to Hong Kong. She put in to Constantinople, Ottoman Empire and the fire was extinguished.
Travancore	United Kingdom	The steamship collided with Manuel Slaguno (United States)) off the coast of Pennsylvania and was damaged.
Torbay	United Kingdom	The ship was driven ashore at Pera. She was refloated on 17 February.
True Briton	United Kingdom	The ship was driven ashore and wrecked in the Dry Tortugas. She was on a voyage from Pensacola to Greenock, Renfrewshire.
Uffo	Denmark	The steamship was holed by ice and sank in the Haff. She was on a voyage from Copenhagen to Stettin, Germany.
Umberto Primo	Italy	The steamship was severely damaged by fire at Buenos Aires.
Violet	United Kingdom	The ship was driven ashore at Barnegat, New Jersey. She was on a voyage from New York to Newport News, Virginia.
Vauquelin	France	The ship ran aground at Saint-Malo, Ille-et-Vilaine.
Vulcan	United Kingdom	The ship was driven ashore at Malta. She was on a voyage from Odesa, Russia to Antwerp. She was refloated in early March.
Wallace	United Kingdom	The steamship was driven ashore at Port Ellen, Islay. Her crew were rescued. she was on a voyage from Glasgow, Renfrewshire to Loch Indaal.
Waterwitch	United Kingdom	The steam yacht sank in Gourock Bay.
Westphalia	United Kingdom	The steamship was driven ashore and wrecked at San Vincente de la Barquera, Spain with the loss of three of her crew. She was on a voyage from Huelva, Spain to Garston, Lancashire.
William Hunter	United Kingdom	The steamship ran aground on the Blyth Sand, in the Thames Estuary.
William Maccoy	United Kingdom	The barquentine foundered with the loss of all seven crew. She was on a voyage from Newfoundland to Gloucester.
Wivenhoe	United Kingdom	The steamship ran aground on the False Ras Ghareb Reef, in the Red Sea. She was on a voyage from South Shields to Bombay, India.
Unnamed	Flag unknown	A steamship was driven ashore on the south coast of Amack, Denmark.
Unnamed	Flag unknown	A lighter collided with another lighter and sank at Elsfleth.
