= Zinedine Zebar =

Algerian photojournalist

Zinedine Zebar (in Arabic: زين الدين زبار) was an Algerian photojournalist born in 1957 in Sétif and died on November 12, 2020, due to COVID-19. He studied in France before working as a reporter and contributor for international media such as Le Monde, The Times, and Le Figaro. Upon returning to Algeria in 2008, he documented Algerian heritage, notably Djamaa el Djazaïr (Great Mosque of Algiers) and the country's lighthouses.

== Biography ==
Zinedine Zebar was born in 1957 in Sétif, Algeria, during the colonial period. Passionate about photography from a young age, he pursued his studies at the School of Photography in Paris and at the University of Paris VIII.

In 1988, Zebar became a reporter-photographer for a Parisian news agency. He covered many international events as a special correspondent in several countries. Starting in 2008, he began a freelance career, collaborating with prestigious Algerian and foreign media, including Le Monde, Le Figaro, Paris Match, Le Parisien, Al-Ahram, Der Spiegel, and The Times.

In the same year, he returned to Algeria where he opened a 4 m^{2} space in Algiers called "ZZ Art et Image." This kiosk, located on Khemissti Boulevard and specializing in tourist photography, offered a varied collection: photographic works created by Zebar himself, art books on photography, old magazines, and postcards. He was known for giving away his photographs, often more than he sold.

In the last years of his life, Zebar was particularly interested in documenting the construction of the Great Mosque of Algiers (Djamaâ El-Djazaïr). He chronicled the progress of the site from its foundations, producing hundreds of photos. Some of the photographs were sent to American historian Jonathan M. Bloom for his book Architecture of the Islamic West: North Africa and the Iberian Peninsula, 700–1800.

At the same time, he was preparing a project titled Algiers Seen from the Sky, in collaboration with the Wilaya of Algiers. Zebar also undertook a photographic project on the lighthouses of Algeria, which he immortalized. This work led to the publication of the book Les Phares d'Algérie, Vigies de la côte in 2016 with Casbah Éditions, in collaboration with Mohamed Balhi.

Zinedine Zebar died on November 12, 2020, due to COVID-19. The minister of communication and government spokesperson, Ammar Belhimer, expressed his condolences to his family, honoring the memory of a photographer whose work contributed to preserving Algerian heritage.
