= Lemseid =

Lemseid لمسيد
- Town
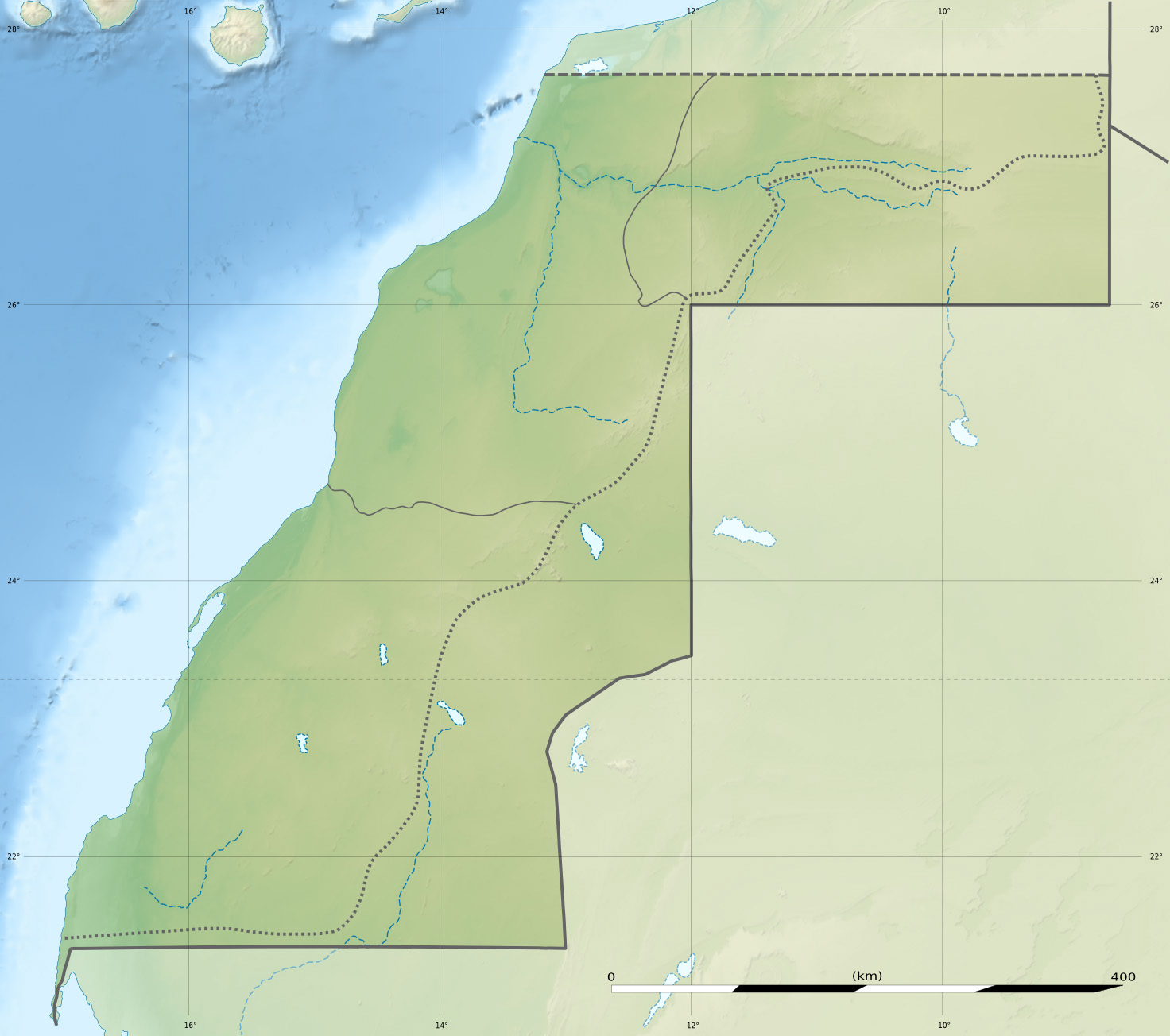
- Location within Western Sahara
- Coordinates: 26°32′25″N 13°50′52″W
- Non-self-governing territory: Western Sahara
- Claimed by: Kingdom of Morocco; Sahrawi Arab Democratic Republic
- Controlled by: Kingdom of Morocco
- Region: Laâyoune-Sakia El Hamra
- Province: Boujdour Province

Area
  - Total: 32.24 km^{2} (12.45 sq mi)

Population (2004)
  - Total: 1,161
  - Density: 36.01/km^{2} (93.27/sq mi)
- Time zone: UTC+0 (GMT)

Lemseid or Lamssid (Arabic: لمسيد, Spanish: Lemsid) is a small town near El-Aaiun in the Saguia el-Hamra part of Moroccan-occupied Western Sahara, close to the Saguia el-Hamra (Red River) itself.

== History ==
The Sahrawi independence activist and leader of the Harakat Tahrir, Muhammad Bassiri, grew up here in the 1950s. It was one of the first cities to be enclosed by the Moroccan Wall during the fighting between the Polisario Front and the Moroccan Army after the invasion of Western Sahara in 1975.

In October 2010, thousands of Sahrawis fled from El Aaiun, Smara or Bojador to the outskirts of Lemseid (Gdeim Izik), raising up a campament of thousands of "jaimas" (Sahrawi tents) called the "Dignity camp", in the biggest Sahrawi mobilization since the Spanish retreat. They protest for the discrimination of Sahrawis in labor and for the spoliation of the natural resources of Western Sahara. They were surrounded by Moroccan Army and police, who made a blockage of water, food and medicines to the camp.

== Geography and climate ==
Lemseid is in the Boujdour Province, between the towns of Boujdour to the southwest and Laayoune to the northeast.

Lamssid has a hot desert climate (Köppen classification BWh). The annual average temperature is 20.8 °C (69.4 °F). The average annual precipitation is 37 millimetres (1.5 in).
