= Cap Blanc Lighthouse =

Lighthouse in Mauritania

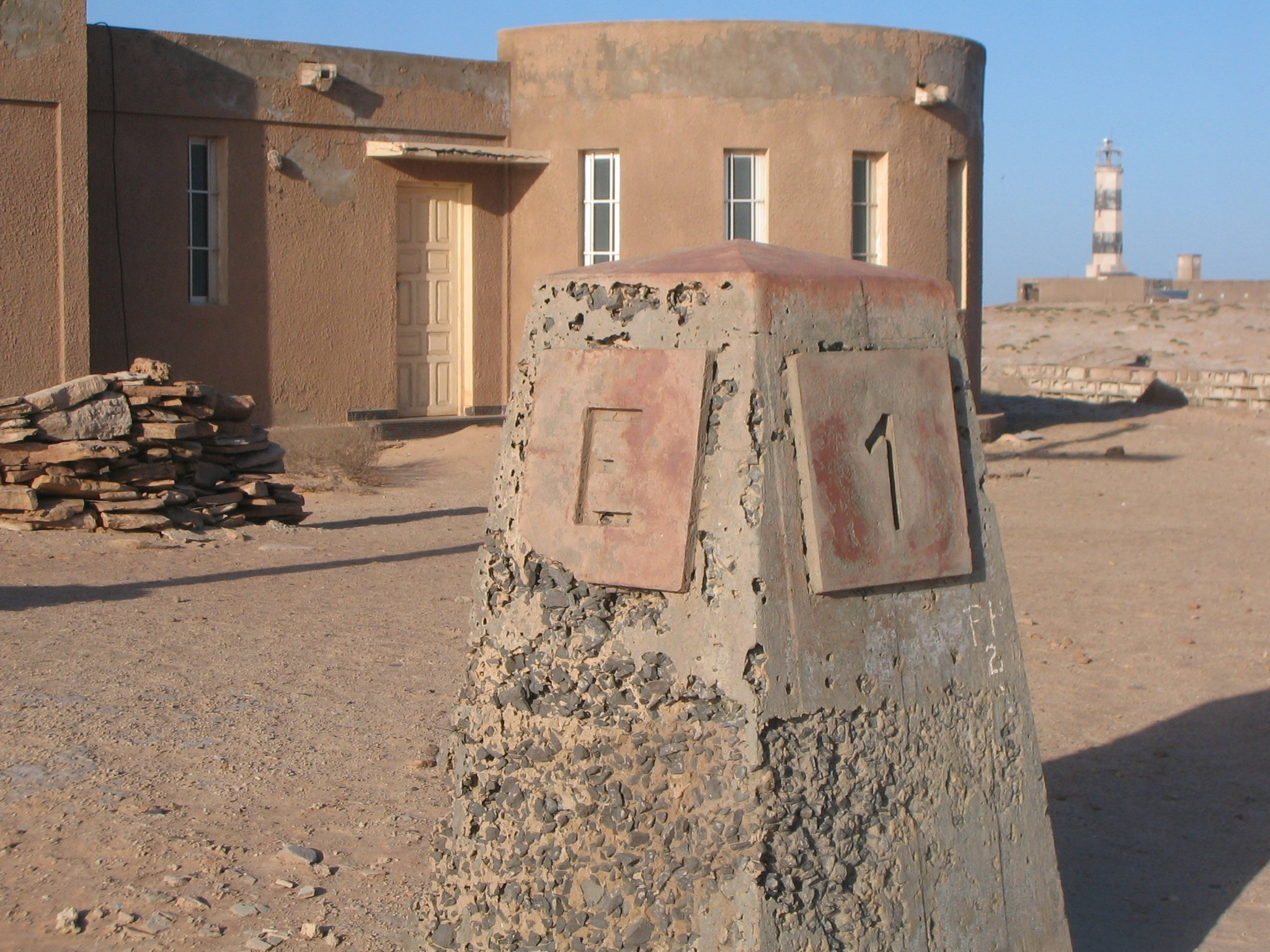
- Cap Blanc in 2005
- Location: southwest of Nouadhibou, Mauritania near the border with the Western Sahara
- Coordinates: 20°46′20.5″N 17°02′51.2″W

Tower
- Constructed: 1910

The Cap Blanc Lighthouse (also known as the Ras Nouadhibou Lighthouse) is an active lighthouse located on Ras Nouadhibou (French: Cap Blanc) in Mauritania. Constructed in 1910, it is today located only a few feet from Mauritania's border with Western Sahara. In recent years the lighthouse has been incorporated as the rear range light of a pair of leading lights. A modern fiberglass light structure forms the front of the range. The lighthouse serves as a landfall light for the port of Nouadhibou. A few kilometers northeast near Cansado is the Pointe de Cansado lighthouse, built in 1913.

== See also ==
- List of lighthouses in Mauritania
