= Srigina Island Lighthouse =

Lighthouse in Algeria

Île Srigina Lighthouse
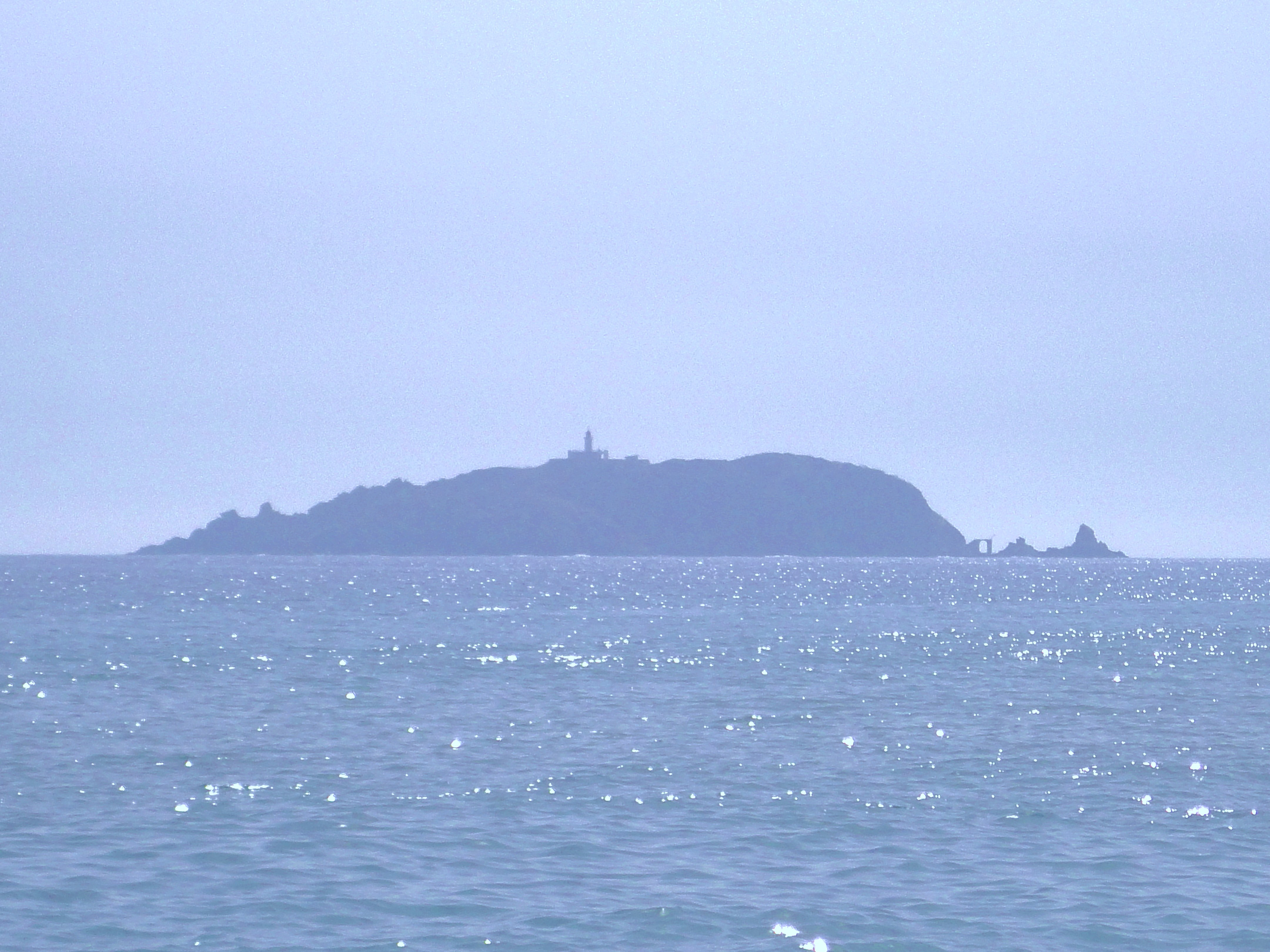
- Location: Srîdjîna, Algeria
- Coordinates: 36°56′16″N 6°53′10″E

Tower
- Constructed: 1847
- Height: 14.3 m

Light
- Focal height: 56.3 m
- Intensity: 180 W/24 V
- Range: 17.5 NM
- Characteristic: Red, 1 flash every 5 seconds

The Srigina Island Lighthouse is located in Algeria on the island of Srigina, at the Western entrance of the harbour of Skikda. It is a landing beacon used to help boats navigate the entry to the Port of Skikda. A lighthouse was first built in 1847, with the current building a reconstruction opened in 1906.

== History ==
Pre-colonisation, there were few lighthouses to guide ships, aside from lanterns such as those set in the tower of the Peñón of Algiers. During the colonial era, more lighthouses were built, including the lighthouse on Srigina Island in 1847.

The lighthouse made newspapers worldwide in 1885 when a swarm of crabs covered the island, even covering up the lantern in the lighthouse.

Between 1891 and 1906, the lighthouse was completely rebuilt, with a petroleum powered light.

== Architecture ==
The lighthouse consists of a tower of a 14.3 m, with a lantern. It is surrounded by an 180 m2 building with photovoltaic pannels on the roof.

== See also ==
- List of lighthouses in Algeria
