= Cap Caxine =

Cape in Algiers Province, Algeria

Cape Caxine Lighthouse
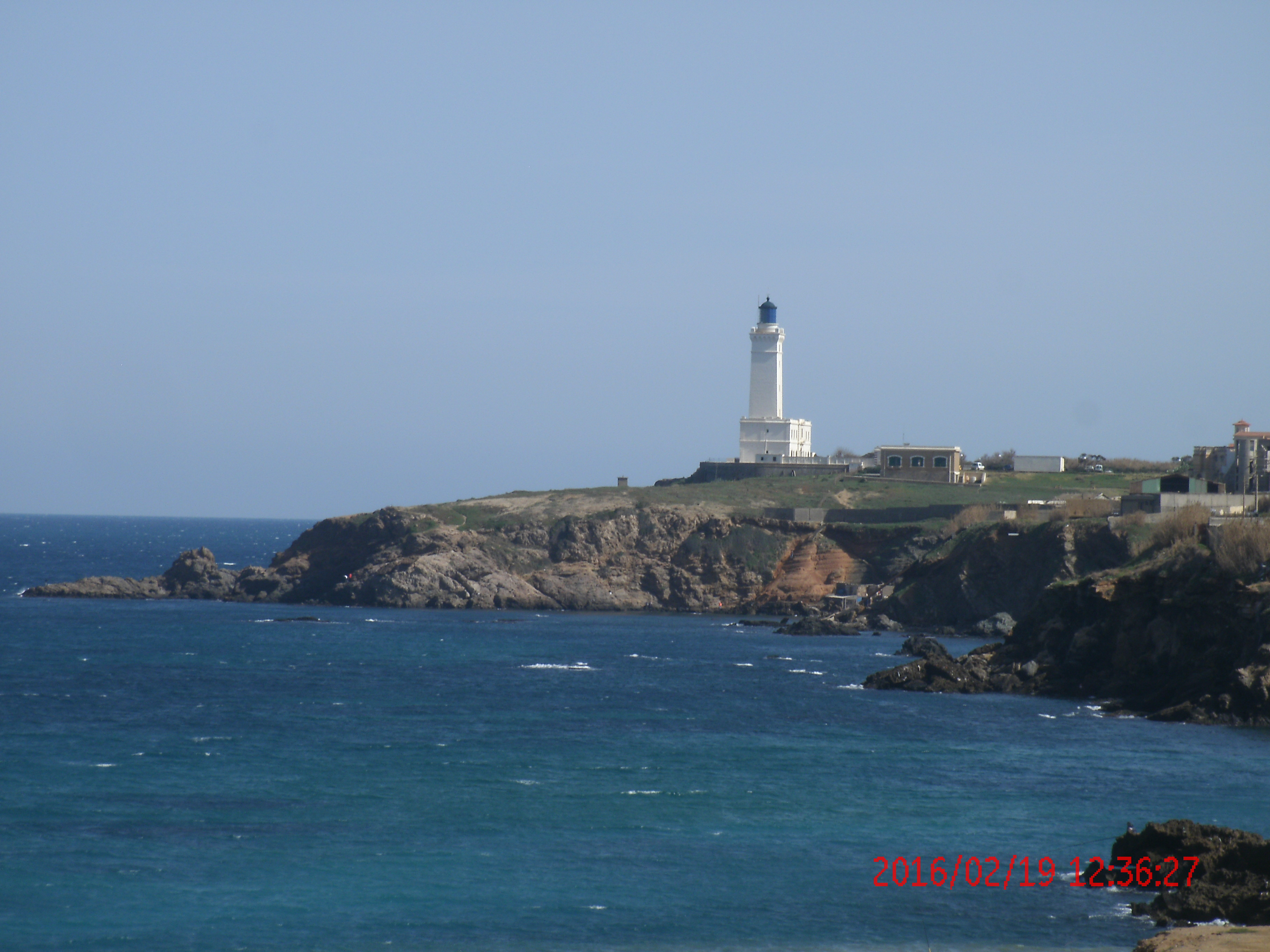
- Location: Cap Caxine, Hammamet, Algeria
- Coordinates: 36°48′46″N 2°57′15″E

Tower
- Constructed: 1868
- Construction: masonry tower
- Height: 33 m (108 ft)
- Shape: quadrangular tower with balcony and lantern atop a 2-storey keeper’s house
- Markings: white tower, blue lantern
- Operator: Office Nationale de Signalisation Maritime

Light
- Focal height: 64 m (210 ft)
- Range: 30 nmi (56 km; 35 mi)
- Characteristic: Fl W 5s

Cap Caxine is a cape located in Algeria.

== See also ==
- List of lighthouses in Algeria
