= List of lighthouses in Mauritania =

This is a list of lighthouses in Mauritania.

== Lighthouses ==
Name	Image	Year built	Location & coordinates	Class of Light	Focal height	NGA number	Admiralty number	Range nml
Cap Blanc Lighthouse	Image	1910	20°46′20.5″N 17°02′51.2″W	Fl W 5s.	43 metres (141 ft)	24340	D2977	17
Nouakchott Approach Lighthouse	Image	1980s	17°59′40.1″N 16°01′27.5″W	Fl W 4s.	37 metres (121 ft)	24373	D2986	16
Pointe de Cansado Lighthouse		1913 est.	20°51′17.2″N 17°01′43.4″W	Q WR	20 metres (66 ft)	24360	D2979	white: 11 red: 8
Pointe Chacal Lighthouse		n/a	20°53′51.9″N 17°03′23.1″W	Iso WRG 4s.	20 metres (66 ft)	24364	D2980	white: 11 red: 8 green: 8

== See also ==
- List of lighthouses in Western Sahara (to the north)
- List of lighthouses in Senegal (to the south)
- Lists of lighthouses and lightvessels
