= List of lighthouses in Morocco =

This is a list of lighthouses in Morocco, which are located along the Mediterranean, and Atlantic coastlines of the country.

== Lighthouses ==
Name	Image	Location coordinates	Waterbody	Year built	Tower height	Focal height	Range nml	Admiralty number
Cap des Trois Fourches Lighthouse		Cape Three Forks; 35.4383°N 2.9633°W	Mediterranean	1909	18 m (59 ft)	112 m (367 ft)	19 nmi (35 km)	E6778
Cap Rhir Lighthouse		Tamri; 30.6333°N 9.8833°W	Atlantic	1931	42 m (138 ft)	85 m (279 ft)	22 nmi (41 km)	D2608
Cap Spartel Lighthouse		Cap Spartel; 35.7917°N 5.9217°W	Atlantic	1864	24 m (79 ft)	91 m (299 ft)	30 nmi (56 km)	D2510
El Hank Lighthouse		Casablanca; 33.6117°N 7.6567°W	Atlantic	1919	49 m (161 ft)	65 m (213 ft)	30 nmi (56 km)	D2574
Cap Malabata Lighthouse		Cape Malabata; 35.8167°N 5.7483°W	Atlantic	Unknown	18 m (59 ft)	76 m (249 ft)	22 nmi (41 km)	D2498
Rabat Lighthouse		Rabat; 34.035°N 6.8467°W	Atlantic	1920	24 m (79 ft)	31 m (102 ft)	16 nmi (30 km)	D2554
Sidi Bou Afi Lighthouse		El Jadida; 33.25°N 8.5167°W	Atlantic	1916	46 m (151 ft)	65 m (213 ft)	30 nmi (56 km)	D2588
Cap Sim		Ouassane 31.39667°N 9.82964°W	Atlantic	1917	20 m (65 ft)	103 m (338 ft)	21 nmi (39 km)	D2604

== See also ==
- List of lighthouses in Western Sahara (to the south)
- List of lighthouses in Algeria (to the east)
- Lists of lighthouses and lightvessels
