= Boujdour Lighthouse =

Boujdour lighthouse
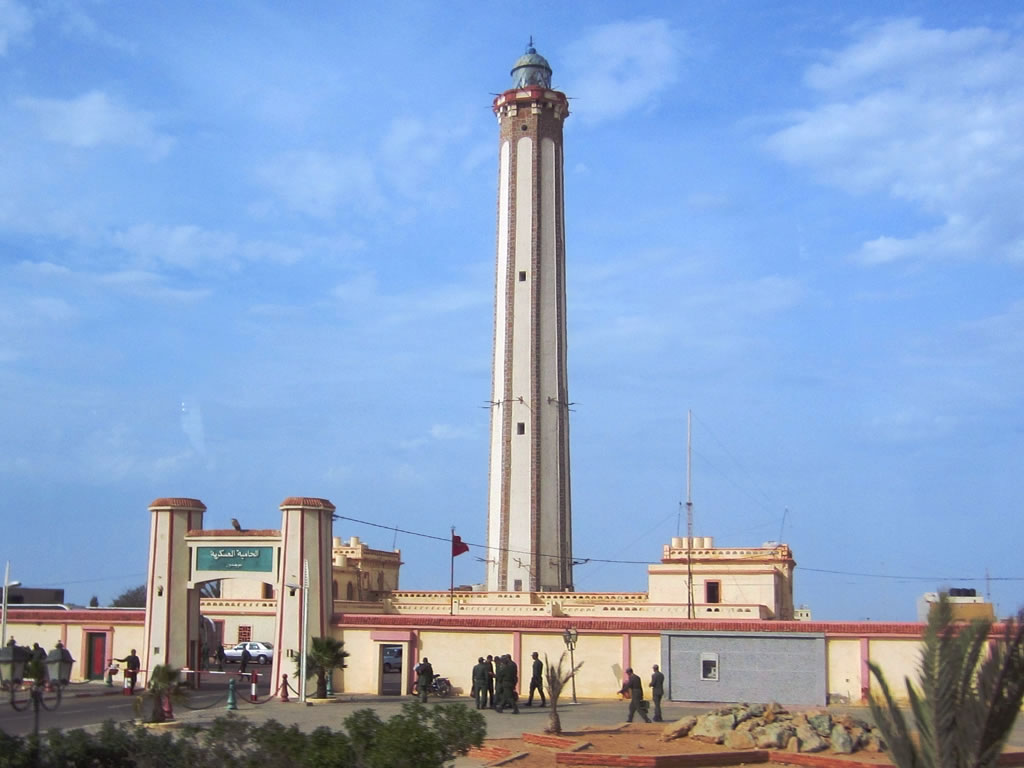
- Lighthouse and military base
- Location: Cape Bojador, Boujdour, Western Sahara
- Coordinates: 26°07′26″N 14°29′10″W

Tower
- Constructed: 1953
- Height: 52 m (171 ft)
- Operator: National Ports Agency
- Heritage: Moroccan cultural heritage

Light
- First lit: 1959
- Focal height: 70 m (230 ft)
- Range: 24 nmi (44 km; 28 mi)
- Characteristic: Fl(3) W 15s

The Boujdour lighthouse (Spanish: Faro de Bojador, French: Phare de Boujdour, Arabic: منارة راس بوجدور) is a lighthouse located near Cape Bojador in the city of Boujdour in the Laâyoune-Sakia El Hamra region, in Moroccan-occupied Western Sahara. The Boujdour lighthouse became a historical monument.

== History ==
The lighthouse is on the Atlantic coast in the center of the city of Boujdour, 180 kilometres (110 mi) south of Laayoune. The present structure replaced a 1903 square tower on the fort of Boujdour. It was built while Western Sahara was a Spanish colony. Work began in 1953 and the lighthouse was commissioned in 1959. Morocco occupied the territory in 1975 and created Boujdour Province in 1976. The legal status is still disputed.

== Structure ==
The lighthouse tower is 52 metres (171 ft) high. The building has a circular diameter of about 3 metres (9.8 ft). The structure contains a particularly hard stone, similar to granite. It is a white conical (Note: The ministry describes the tower as conical (Tour en béton, conique blanche avec des bandes verticales beiges). Another source says it is octagonal. A third source says it is often thought that it tapers towards the top, but this is not true. The structure may have a circular interior with raised vertical stripes of masonry on the exterior, defining eight faces.) concrete tower, with beige vertical stripes. It has a spiral staircase with 246 steps. The equipment has been modernized. The light emits three white flashes every 15 seconds, at a focal height of 70 metres (230 ft) above sea level, with a maximum range of approximately 44 kilometres (27 mi).

The lighthouse is considered a historical monument. It is managed by the Port and Maritime Authority within the Ministry of Equipment, Transport and Logistics.

== Sources ==
- Rowlett, Russ. "Lighthouses of Morocco: Atlantic Coast". The Lighthouse Directory. University of North Carolina at Chapel Hill.
- "Cabo Bojador Light", Lighthouse Digest Magazine, Foghorn Publishing
- Hisham El Madraoui (11 July 2014), "Lighthouse Ras Boujdour", Al Maghrib Today (in Arabic), El Oyoun
- Phare de Boujdour (in French), Ministère de l’Equipement du Transport, de la Logistique et de l’Eau, archived from the original on 2017-09-06
- Phares du Maroc, Ministère de l’Equipement du Transport, de la Logistique et de l’Eau
