= Aftissat =

Aftissat أفتيسات (Arabic) Aufist (Spanish)
- Village
- Interactive map of Aftissat
- Coordinates: 25.6146°N 14.6830°W
- Claimed by: Morocco
- Controlled by: Morocco
- Region: Laâyoune-Sakia El Hamra
- Province: Boujdour Province

Area
  - Total: 13.46 km^{2} (5.20 sq mi)

Population (2004)
  - Total: 92
  - Density: 6.8/km^{2} (18/sq mi)
- Time zone: UTC+0 (GMT)

Aftissat (Arabic: أفتيسات; Spanish: Aufist) is a fishing village in Morocco It is the location of a large onshore wind farm.

== Location ==
Aftissat is on the Atlantic coast in Boujdour Province of the Moroccan Sahara. The village is on National Road No. 1, in the section that links the cities of Boujdour and Dakhla, 63 km southwest of Boujdour and 286 km northeast of Dakhla. It belongs to the Jraifia commune in the Boujdour province of the Laayoune-Sakia El Hamra region.

== Origins ==
The village of Aftissat was established in 2005 as part of a development program of the Ministry of Agriculture and Fisheries, aimed at establishing fishermen's villages and equipped ports along the Moroccan coast, in order to strengthen the marine fishing sector and revive traditional fishing. It is one of four fishing villages in the Boujdour province, the others being Lacraa, Agti el Ghazi (اكطً الغازي) and Port Boujdour (مٌناء بوجدور).

== Facilities and infrastructure ==
Aftissat has one fish market, 30 stores for fish trading and 204 stores for sailors, as well as a box store and an engine repair workshop. The village has 635 boats for traditional fishing.

== Wind farm ==
The Aftissat wind farm was built by Energie Eolienne du Maroc (EEM), a wholly owned subsidiary of Nareva. It has 56 Siemens wind turbines with nominal power of 3.6MW, and delivers 201.6MW, or 1,000GWh per year. Windhoist was responsible for erecting the turbines. The project cost was estimated as $391 million. The project included construction of the 250 kilometres (160 mi) 400kV power line from Laayoune to Aftissat. This is a stage in connecting Dakhla, which is further south, to the Moroccan grid.

Commercial operations began in October 2018. The wind farm delivers energy over the national VHV/HV network to large industrial consumers. Customers mentioned in a December 2016 statement by Nareva included LafargeHolcim Maroc, OCP, Ciments du Maroc, Sonasid, Managem, la Snep and Air Liquide Maroc. Both the EU Court of Justice and the UN Human Rights Council have said that the consent of representatives of the people of Western Sahara is required for a project like this. This requirement does not seem to have been met. The issue was raised in a question to the EU parliament. The response was that the EU would respond to questions about exploitation of natural resources by pointing out the unresolved legal status of Western Sahara.

In September 2021 GE Renewable Energy (Note: GE Renewable Energy is a Paris-based subsidiary of General Electric of the United States.) announced that EEM had selected it to supply 40 onshore wind turbines to power a 200MW extension to the Aftissat onshore wind farm. The Cypress turbines will be moderated at 5.0MW, and will have rotors with a 158 metres (518 ft) diameter. The project was expected to come into operation in 2023. Following the expansion the Aftissat wind farm would be the largest in Morocco.

== Sources ==
- Aftissat Wind Farm, Morocco, Windhoist
- Anita Anyango (5 October 2021), "Aftissat wind farm in Morocco set for expansion", Pumps Africa
- Annuaire Statistique Regional Laayoune - Sakia el Hamra (in French), Rotaume de Maric Haut-Commissariat au Plan, 2015
- Federica Mogherini (5 April 2018), E-000152/2018 Answer given by Vice-President Mogherini on behalf of the Commission
- GE Renewable Energy and Nareva to build 200 MW Aftissat onshore wind farm extension in Morocco, GE Renewable Energy, 30 September 2021
- "Morocco: GE wins contract to expand Aftissat wind farm by 200 MW", Africa Energy Portal
- "Node: Aftissat أفتيسات (7786015037)", OpenStreetMap
- "Provinces du Sud Le programme villages de pêche bien avancé", L'Économiste (3472), 23 February 2011
- UK company building wind park in occupied Western Sahara, Western Sahara Resource Watch, 30 October 2017
- Wind farm of Aftissat 1, NAREVA
