= Jraifia =

Jraifia اجريفية
- Rural Commune and Town
- Location in Western Sahara Jraifia (Africa)
- Coordinates: 24°54′34″N 14°49′38″W
- Territory: Morocco
- Region: Laâyoune-Sakia El Hamra
- Province: Boujdour Province

Area
  - Total: 818.89 km^{2} (316.18 sq mi)

Population (2014)
  - Total: 950
  - Density: 1.2/km^{2} (3.0/sq mi)
- Time zone: UTC+0 (GMT)

Historical population
Year	Pop.	±%
2004	1,385	—
2014	950	−31.4%

Jraifia is a small town and rural commune in the Boujdour Province of the Laâyoune-Sakia El Hamra region of the Moroccan-occupied part of Western Sahara. At the time of the 2014 census, the commune had a total population of 950 people. The commune contains the Ramsar site Côte Aftissate-Boujdour.
