= Cap Rosa Lighthouse =

Lighthouse at El Kala, Algeria

- Location: Cap Rosa; El Kala; Algeria
- Coordinates: 36°56′47.27″N 8°14′12.53″E

Tower
- Constructed: 1906
- Foundation: concrete base
- Construction: concrete tower
- Height: 15.30 metres (50.2 ft)
- Shape: cylindrical tower with balcony and lantern
- Markings: white tower, black lantern
- Power source: mains electricity
- Operator: Office Nationale de Signalisation Maritime

Light
- Focal height: 132.30 metres (434.1 ft)
- Range: 19 nautical miles (35 km; 22 mi)
- Characteristic: Fl (2) W 6s.

Cap Rosa Lighthouse is a lighthouse at El Kala, Algeria.

== See also ==
- List of lighthouses in Algeria
