= Boujdour =

Boujdour بوجدور / Cabo Bojador
- City
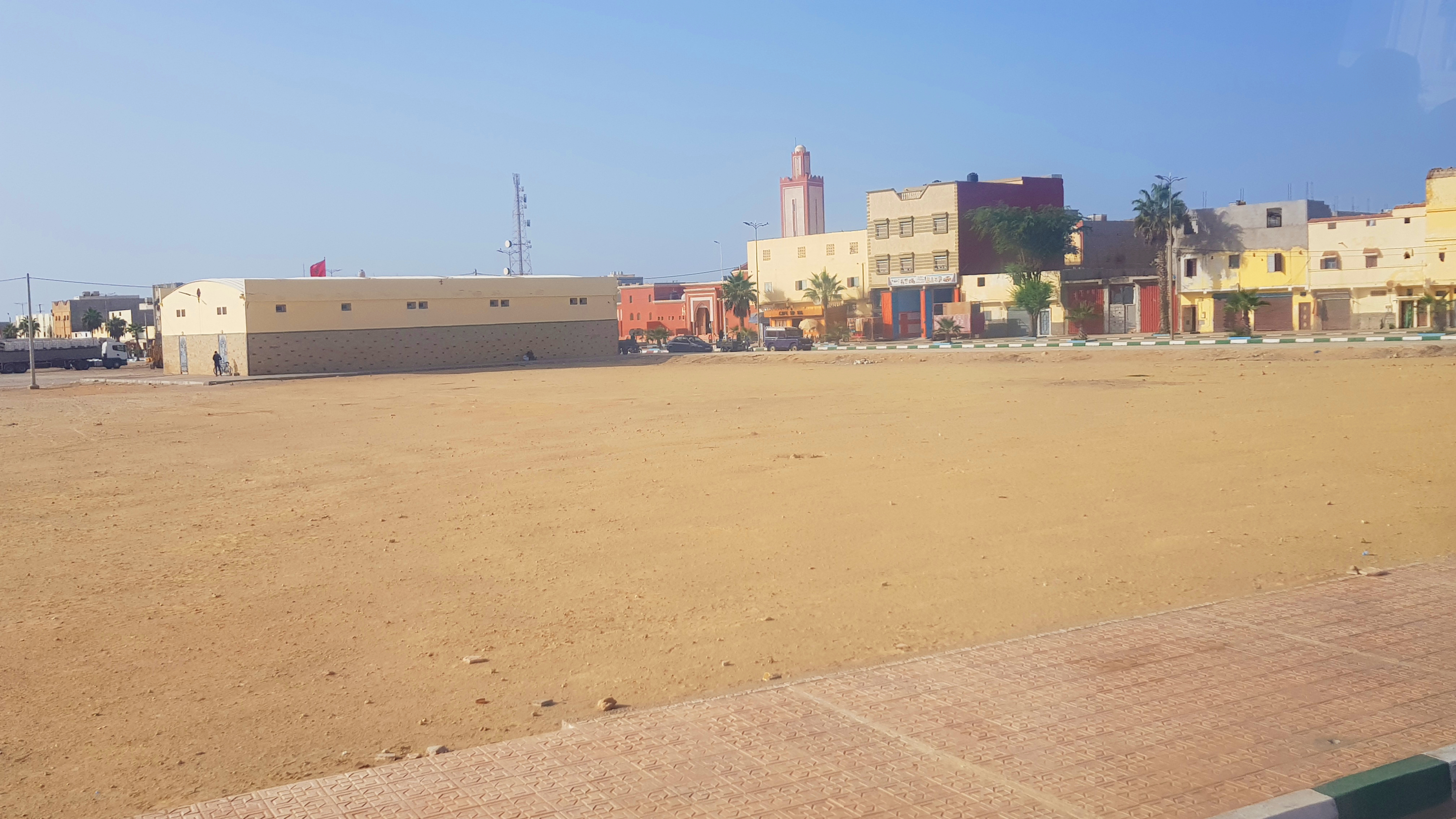
- Boujdour

- Seal

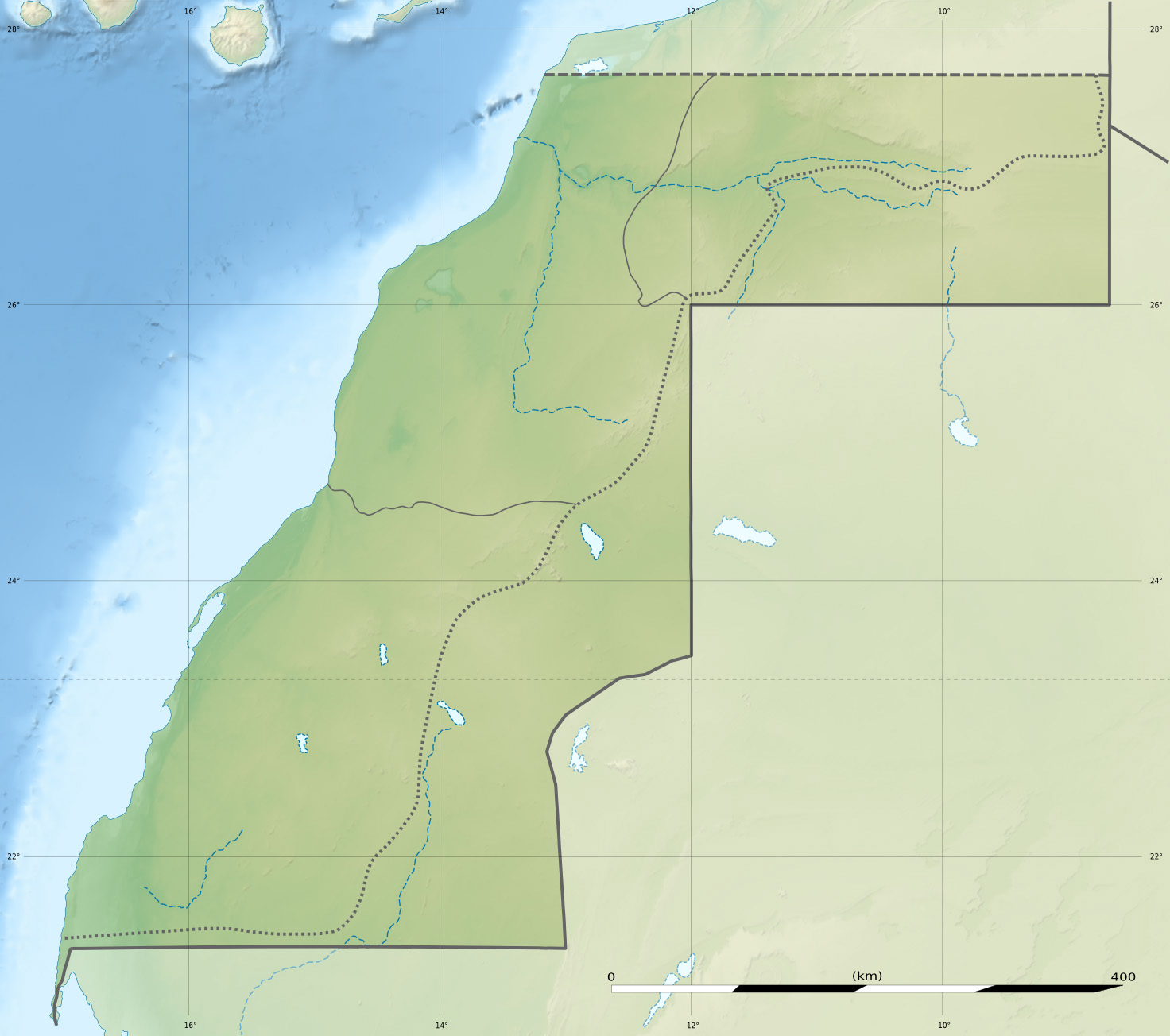
- Location within Western Sahara
- Coordinates: 26°07′59″N 14°28′01″W
- Territory: Western Sahara
- Region: Laâyoune-Sakia El Hamra
- Province: Boujdour Province

Government
  - Mayor: Abdelaziz Abba (Istiqlal)

Area
  - Total: 62.49 km^{2} (24.13 sq mi)

Population (2014)
  - Total: 42,651
  - Density: 682.5/km^{2} (1,768/sq mi)
- Website: communedeboujdour.ma

Historical population
Year	Pop.	±%
2004	36,843	—
2014	42,651	+15.8%

Boujdour (or Bujdur, Bojador, Arabic: بوجدور, Hassaniyya: [buʒduːr]) is a coastal city in the disputed territory of Western Sahara, near Cape Bojador. It is administered by Morocco which includes it in the administrative division of the Southern Provinces. It is an urban municipality in Boujdour Province, in the Laâyoune-Sakia El Hamra region.

== History ==
Boujdour was originally a fishing village built around the Cape Boujdour Lighthouse. The locality was administered by Spain from 1860 to 1975. From 1976, the city began to acquire an urban character, supported by population growth and its new port. Emerging from the desert, Boujdour has become the capital of the province. It has benefited from the “Al Aouda” and “Al Wahda” programs. The state's effort in favor of this province is also directed towards the creation of fishing villages. On the other hand, in 1976, a seawater desalination unit was installed there and research led to the discovery of underground water in the vicinity of the city.

The town was attacked by the Polisario Front on 13 February 1980.

== Demography ==
According to Moroccan censuses; Boujdour had 36,843 inhabitants in 2004 and 42,651 in 2014.

== Harbour ==
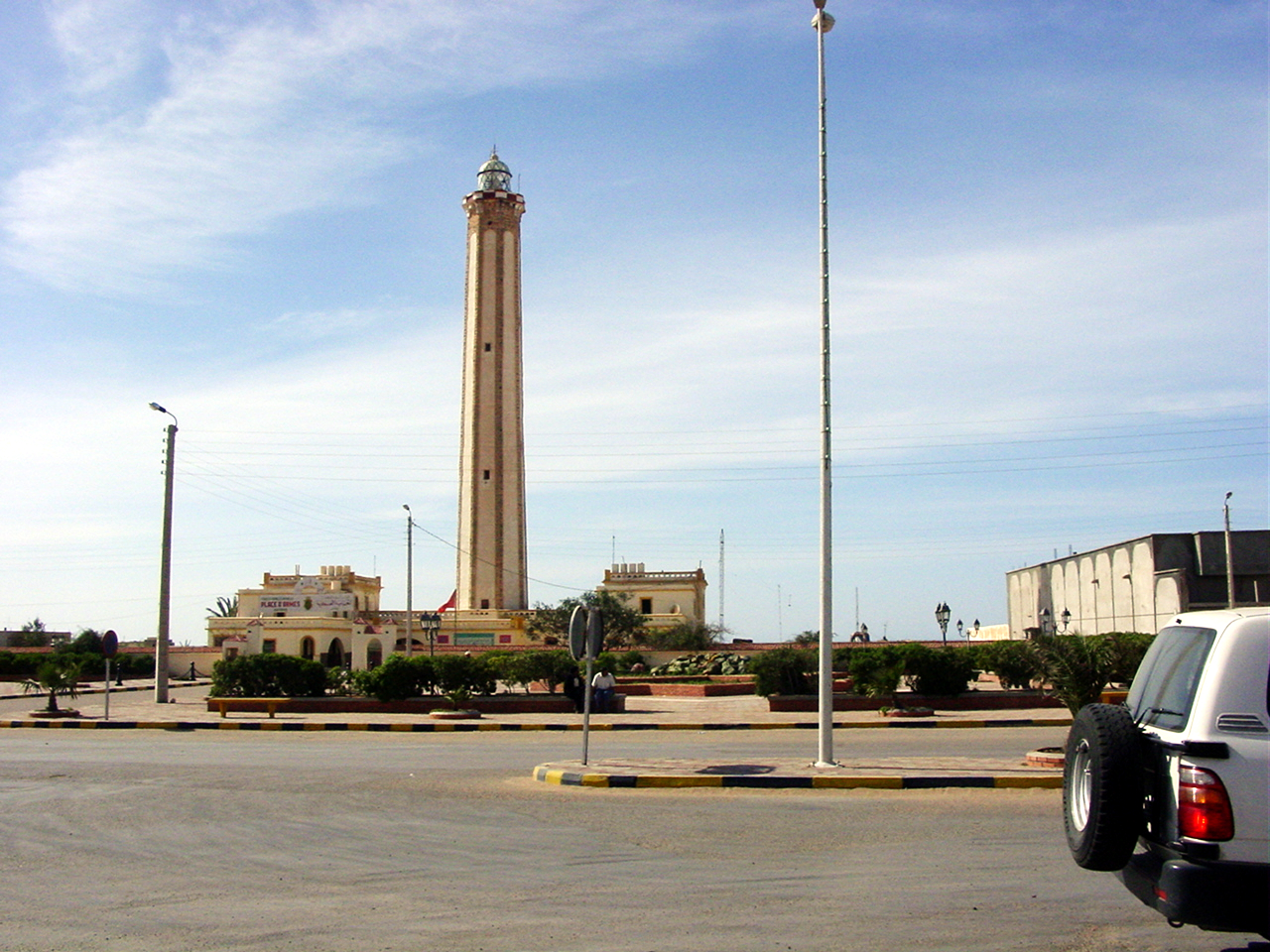
Boujdour Lighthouse

Port Boujdour is one of four fishing ports in the Boujdour province, the others being Lacraa, Aftissat (أفتيسات) and Agti el Ghazi (أغتي الغازي) . The port is protected by a 724 metres (2,375 ft) barrier and a 260 metres (850 ft) embankment. There are two docks for the coastal fleet, one 150 metres (490 ft) long and the other 160 metres (520 ft) long. There are three 60 metres (200 ft) berths for the traditional fleet. The port has a sloped shore for hauling fishing boats onto land. As of 2012 infrastructure included:

- A fish market.
- A platform for classification of industrial fish.
- 8 traditional workshops to repair fishing boats.
- 25 warehouses for fish wholesalers located outside the fishing area.
- 168 warehouses for ship owners inside the port.
- Two ice plants in the process of being completed.
- Two petrol stations are in the process of being completed.
- A medical center with an area of 100 square meters.
- Standard Container Management Unit.

The Boujdour maritime district in 2012 had 1,732 licensed traditional fishing boats, of which 765 operated from the port of Boujdour. There were 5,200 sailors or divers in the district, about 200 fish wholesalers, 50 industrial workers and 33 carpenters, and 147 in other occupations such as fishing with rods and collecting algae and snails. There was one unit for drying fish, two units for packing fresh fish and three accredited centers for packing and shipping live oysters.

== Education ==
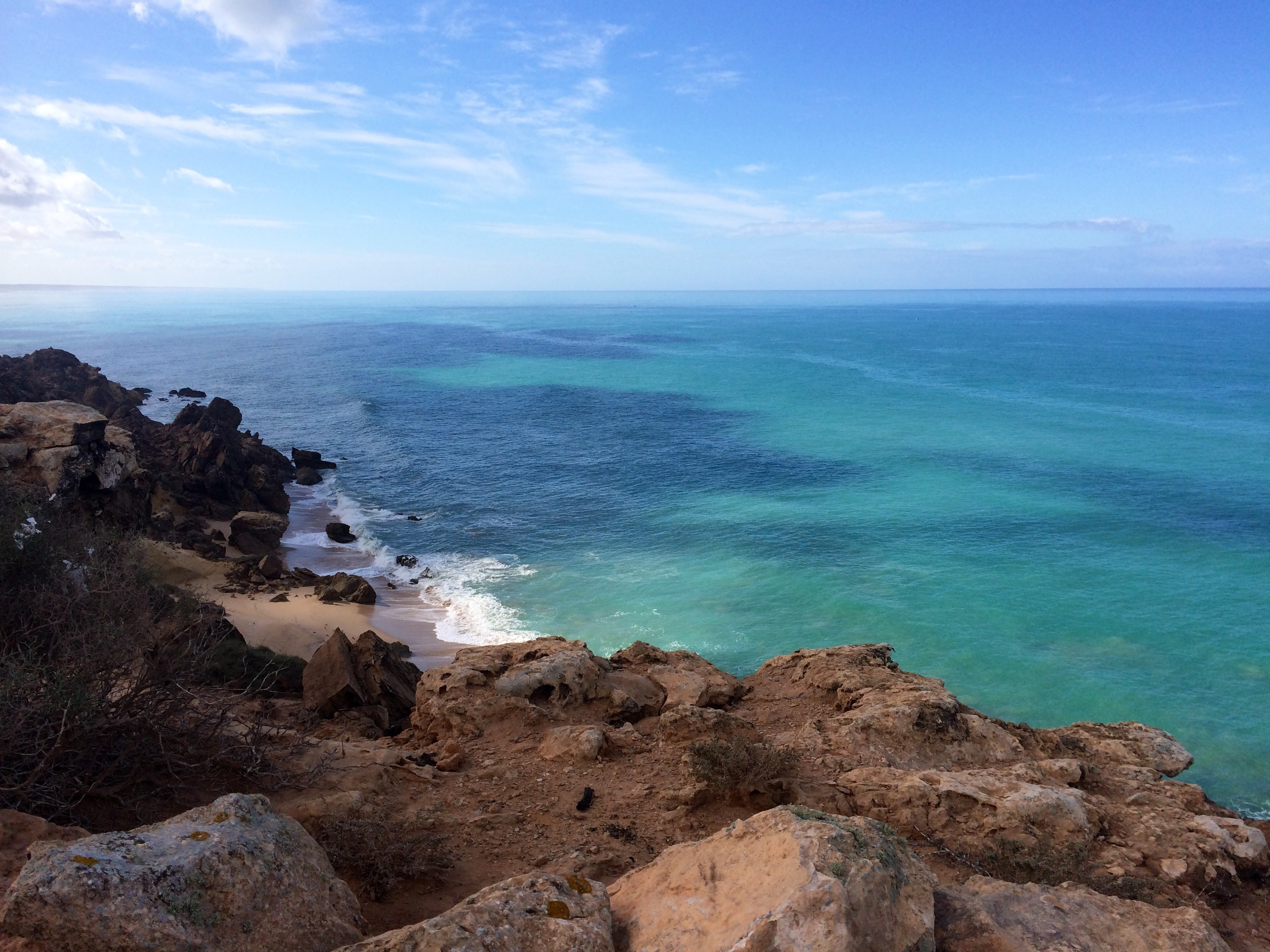
Atlantic coast (Boujdour)

Elementary schools:

- Abdul Aziz Khaya School
- Hassan II School
- Moulay Rachid School
- Emission School
- Al Masirah School

Middle schools:

- Ibn Tofail middle school
- Jerusalem middle school
- Omar Ibn Al-Khattab middle school

Secondary schools:

- Jaber bin Hayyan High School (ثانوية جابر بن حيان)
- Ahmed bin Mohammed Al Rashidi High School (ثانوية أحمد بن محمد الراشدي)

Special education

- Ajyal Boujdour Foundation (مؤسسة أجيال بوجدور)

Other institutions

- Boujdour Maritime Vocational Rehabilitation Center (مركز التأهيل المهني البحري بوجدور). The center was launched in 2013 and covers an area of more than 1,000 square metres (11,000 sq ft). It provides training for male and female students in fishing and dealing with mechanical equipment. It is supported by the Ministry of National Education, Vocational Training, and the Ministry of Agriculture and Fishing.
- Boujdour Specialized Institute of Applied Technology (المعهد المتخصص للتكنولوجيا التطبيقية بوجدور). The institute offers courses in commerce, electrical installation, automobile repair and Microsoft Office.

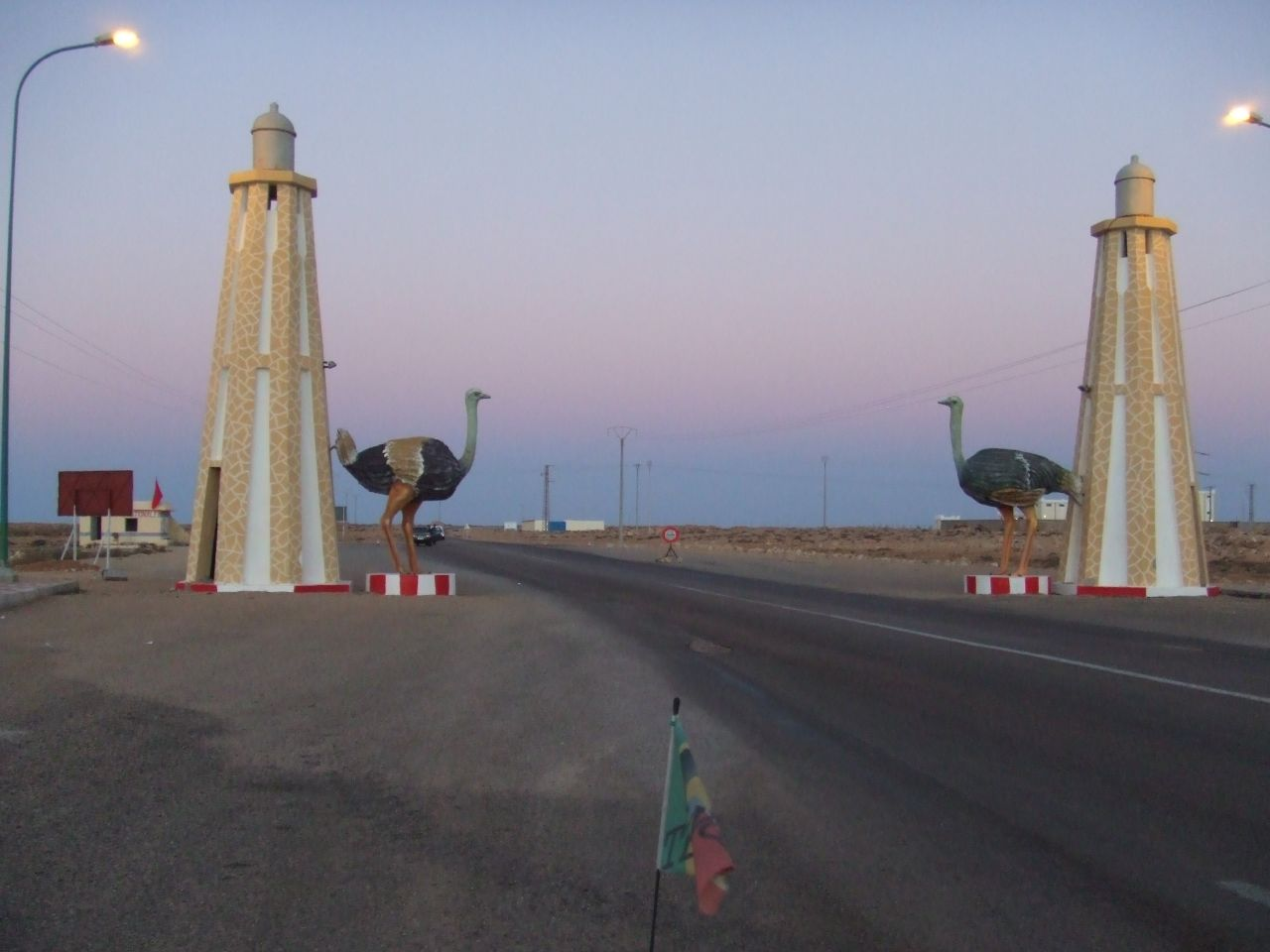
Route N1 at the exit from Boujdour

== Health ==
The city of Boujdour has a regional hospital that has been operating since 1991. As of 2017 it had 36 beds, 16 doctors, 74 nurses and 45 administrative staff. A 2018 audit was critical of the hospital's administration and procedures. The hospital did not have an intensive care unit, so the most serious cases had to be transferred to the regional hospital in Laayoune, 200 kilometres (120 mi) away. The hospital was also not equipped for orthopedic surgery. Facilities for handling pharmaceuticals were inadequate. The Ministry of Health responded that it was working on improvements, but was handicapped by shortage of human resources. In 2020 it was reported that modern medical equipment had been delivered to the hospital, which would help it cope with the Covid-19 pandemic.

== Twin cities ==
- Keta, Ghana, since 20 December 2009

== Sources ==
- Annuaire Statistique Regional Laayoune - Sakia el Hamra (in French), Rotaume de Maric Haut-Commissariat au Plan, 2015
- Boujdour Hospital benefits from important medical equipment (in Arabic), MAP: Agence Marocain de Presse, 3 May 2020, archived from the original on 2020-05-04
- Boujdour port presentation card (PDF) (in Arabic), Département de la peche maritime, 2012
- Laila Habibi (18 September 2021), "The Maritime Vocational Rehabilitation Center in Boujdour is preparing to launch specific courses targeting professionals in the fishing and mechanics divisions", Albahr News (in Arabic)
- Le Centre hospitalier provincial de Boujdour (PDF) (in French), Cour des comptes au titre de l’année 2018 v, 2018, archived from the original (PDF) on 2021-05-22
- "Nouvelle attaque du Polisario contre une localité du Sahara occidental", Le Monde (in French), 16 February 1980
- Population légale des régions, provinces, préfectures, municipalités, arrondissements et communes du Royaume d'après les résultats du RGPH 2014 (Xls), Rabat: Haut-Commissariat au plan
- "Specialized Institute of Applied Technology - Boujdour", OFPPT (in Arabic)
