= List of lighthouses in Algeria =

This is a list of lighthouses in Algeria. The list includes those maritime lighthouses that are named landfall lights, or have a range of at least fifteen nautical miles. They are located along the Mediterranean coastline, and on a number of Algerian islands.

== Lighthouses ==
Name	Image	Location & coordinates	Year built	Tower height	Focal height	Range	NGA number
Cap Bengut Lighthouse		Dellys; 36°55′20″N 3°53′36″E	2010	29 m (95 ft)	63 m (207 ft)	30 nmi (56 km)	22360
Cap Bougaroun Lighthouse		Skikda Province; 37°05′16″N 6°28′02″E	Unknown	10 m (33 ft)	91 m (299 ft)	29 nmi (54 km)	22284
Cap Carbon Lighthouse		Béjaïa; 36°46′34″N 5°06′15″E	1851	10 m (33 ft)	220 m (722 ft)	28 nmi (52 km)	22328
Cap Caxine Lighthouse		Cape Caxine; 36°48′46″N 2°57′15″E	1868	33 m (108 ft)	64 m (210 ft)	30 nmi (56 km)	22424
Cap Colombi Lighthouse		El Marsa; 36°26′35″N 0°56′20″E	1954	32 m (105 ft)	62.9 m (206 ft)	22 nmi (41 km)	22512
Cap Corbelin Lighthouse	Image	Azeffoun; 36°54′34″N 4°25′27″E	1905	15 m (49 ft)	42 m (138 ft)	22 nmi (41 km)	22340
Cap Falcon Lighthouse	Image	Aïn El Turk; 35°46′16″N 0°48′03″W	1868	28.7 m (94 ft)	106 m (348 ft)	29 nmi (54 km)	22672
Cap de Fer Lighthouse		Skikda Province; 37°04′47″N 7°10′17″E	1859	17 m (56 ft)	65 m (213 ft)	19 nmi (35 km)	22228
Cap de Garde Lighthouse		Annaba; 36°58′03″N 7°47′00″E	1884	14 m (46 ft)	143 m (469 ft)	30 nmi (56 km)	22208
Cap de l'Aiguille Lighthouse		Oran; 35°52′33″N 0°29′19″W	1865	10 m (33 ft)	62 m (203 ft)	26 nmi (48 km)	22580
Cap Falcon Lighthouse	Image	Oran; 35°46′16″N 0°48′03″W	1868	27 m (89 ft)	104 m (341 ft)	31 nmi (57 km)	22672
Cap Ivi Lighthouse		Mostaganem Province; 36°06′46″N 0°13′37″E	1898	18 m (59 ft)	118 m (387 ft)	31 nmi (57 km)	22520
Cap Matifou Lighthouse	Image	Tamentfoust; 36°48′42″N 3°14′43″E	1868	6 m (20 ft)	74 m (243 ft)	23 nmi (43 km)	22368
Cap Rosa Lighthouse	Image	El Kala; 36°56′47″N 8°14′13″E	1906	15.30 m (50 ft)	132.30 m (434 ft)	19 nmi (35 km)	22168
Cap Sigli Lighthouse		Béjaïa Province; 36°53′40″N 4°45′32″E	1906	25 m (82 ft)	57 m (187 ft)	17 nmi (31 km)	22336
Cap Ténès Lighthouse		Ténès; 36°32′59″N 1°20′26″E	1865	31 m (102 ft)	89 m (292 ft)	31 nmi (57 km)	22488
Fort Joinville Lighthouse		Cherchell; 36°36′42″N 2°11′17″E	1855	26 m (85 ft)	37 m (121 ft)	21 nmi (39 km)	22468
Ghazaouet Lighthouse	Image	Ghazaouet; 35°05′52″N 1°52′24″W	Unknown	15 m (49 ft)	93 m (305 ft)	26 nmi (48 km)	22700
Île Rachgoun Lighthouse		Béni Saf; 35°19′26″N 1°28′47″W	1870	15 m (49 ft)	81 m (266 ft)	16 nmi (30 km)	22696
Srigina Island Lighthouse		Skikda Province; 36°56′16″N 6°53′10″E	1906	12 m (39 ft)	54 m (177 ft)	20 nmi (37 km)	22272
Îles Habibas Lighthouse		Habibas Islands; 35°43′14″N 1°08′00″W	1879	12 m (39 ft)	112 m (367 ft)	26 nmi (48 km)	22684
Îlot d'Arzew Lighthouse		Oran; 35°52′26″N 0°17′23″W	1848	12 m (39 ft)	19 m (62 ft)	16 nmi (30 km)	22540
Jetee du Large Lighthouse		Oran; 35°43′11″N 0°37′39″W	1905	15 m (49 ft)	21 m (69 ft)	22 nmi (41 km)	22584
Passe Nord Lighthouse	Image	Algiers; 36°46′38″N 3°04′40″E	Unknown	17 m (56 ft)	23 m (75 ft)	20 nmi (37 km)	22380
Pointe Colombi Lighthouse		El Marsa, Chlef; 36°26′35″N 0°56′20″E	Unknown	29 m (95 ft)	60 m (197 ft)	26 nmi (48 km)	22512
Pointe de Dellys Lighthouse		Dellys; 36°55′18″N 3°55′13″E	2007	15 m (49 ft)	41 m (135 ft)	15 nmi (28 km)	22348
Ras Afia Lighthouse		Jijel; 36°49′04″N 5°41′21″E	1871	14 m (46 ft)	43 m (141 ft)	24 nmi (44 km)	22308
Sidi Fredj Lighthouse		Sidi Fredj; 36°45′54″N 2°50′54″E	1970s	24 m (79 ft)	42 m (138 ft)	17 nmi (31 km)	22432
Tipaza Lighthouse		Tipaza; 36°35′50″N 2°26′52″E	1867	13.58 m (45 ft)	34.08 m (112 ft)	18 nmi (33 km)	22444

== See also ==
- List of lighthouses in Morocco (to the west)
- List of lighthouses in Tunisia (to the east)
- Lists of lighthouses and lightvessels
