= Cape Bojador =

Place in Western Sahara

Cape Bojador بوجدور Cabo Bojador
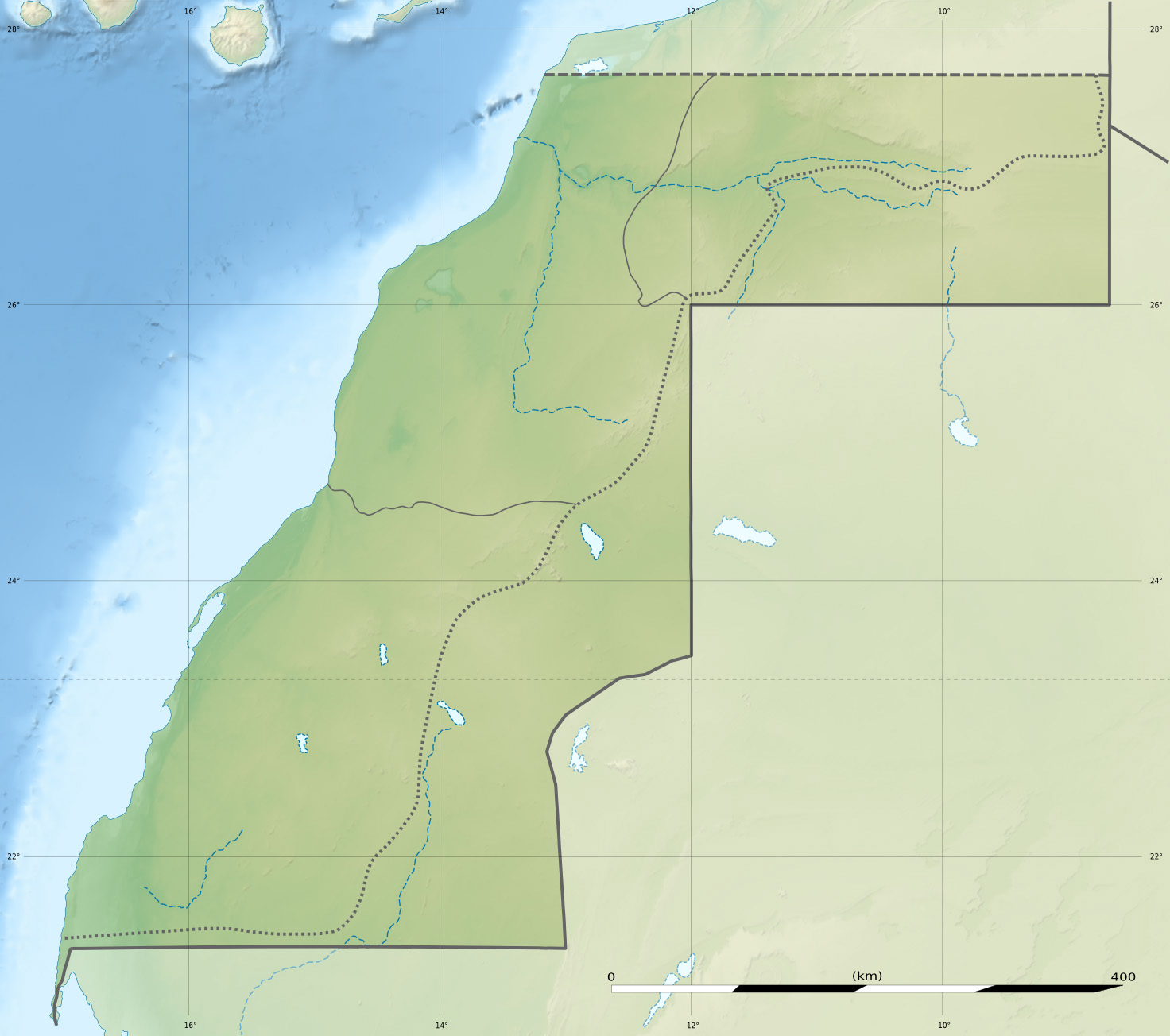
- Location in Western Sahara Cape Bojador (Africa)
- Coordinates: 26°08′N 14°30′W
- Territory: Western Sahara
- Controlled by: Kingdom of Morocco
- Claimed by: Kingdom of Morocco; Sahrawi Arab Democratic Republic

Population (2014)
  - Total: 42,651
- Time zone: UTC+0 (GMT)

Cape Bojador (Arabic: رأس بوجادور, trans. Rā's Būjādūr; Berber languages: ⴱⵓⵊⴷⵓⵔ, Bujdur; Spanish and Portuguese: Cabo Bojador; French: Cap Boujdour) is a headland on the west coast of Moroccan-occupied Western Sahara, at 26° 07' 37"N, 14° 29' 57"W (various sources give various locations: this is from the Sailing Directions for the region), as well as the name of the large nearby town with a population of 42,651. The name of the surrounding province also derives its name from the cape (Boujdour Province).

The original name of the cape in Arabic is Abu Khaṭar (ابو خطر), meaning "father of danger". The Spanish pronunciation of "Bojador", /boxad̪or/, is similar. It is shown on nautical charts, media and academic research with the original Portuguese name "Cabo Bojador", sometimes spelled "Cape Boujdour". It is said that it is also known as the "Bulging Cape", although no references to this usage are to be found in standard geographical references.

The cape is not prominent on maps but may be located by looking 220 km (120 nautical miles) due south of the south-western point of the hook of Fuerteventura, Canary Islands.

== Historical significance ==
The discovery of a passable route around Cape Bojador, in 1434, by the Portuguese mariner Gil Eanes was considered a major breakthrough for European explorers and traders en route to Africa and later to India. Eanes had made a previous attempt in 1433 which resulted in failure, but he tried again under orders of Prince Henry the Navigator. Eanes was successful after the second expedition. The disappearance of numerous European vessels that had made prior attempts to round the Cape despite its violent seas, led some to suggest the presence of sea monsters. The mythic importance of the cape for Portugal was captured in Fernando Pessoa's early 20th century work "Mensagem". In famous stanzas from this longer poem Pessoa wrote of the enormous costs of the Portuguese explorations to the nation. Capturing the symbolic importance to the nation of rounding Cape Bojador, Pessoa wrote: "Who wants to pass beyond Bojador / Must also pass beyond pain." ("Quem quer passar além do Bojador / Tem que passar além da dor.") They thought the ocean was burning past Cape Bojador, but Henry's men went past it.

The reason for the fearsome reputation of the cape is not immediately obvious from maps, where it appears as the south-western point of a slight hump in the coastline, bounded at its other end by Cabo Falso Bojador, ten nautical miles to the northeast. Nor does what is said in the Sailing Directions sound terribly formidable:

Cabo Falso Bojador is formed by several tall sand dunes ... A rocky shoal, with a least depth of 4.8m, extends up to 3 miles N of the cape. A rocky patch, with a least depth of 8m, lies about 2 miles W of the cape. The coast between Cabo Falso Bojador and Cabo Bojador, 10 miles SW, consists of a sandy beach fringed by rocks. Clumps of scrub top the sand dunes which stand about 0.5 mile inland of this beach. Heavy breakers have been observed along this coast at all times. Cabo Bojador, a very low point, is located 9.5 miles SW of Cabo Falso Bojador and is bordered on the S side by black rocks. From the N, the cape appears as a mass of red sand with a gradual slope towards the sea. From the W, the cape is difficult to identify, but from the S its extremity appears as a reef which dries in places and is marked by breakers even in calm weather.

— Sailing Directions

Examining the Pilot Charts for this area, however, it becomes clear that the main concern lies in the changes in winds that occur at about the point at which Cape Bojador is passed in sailing down the coast. It is here that the winds start to blow strongly from the northeast at all seasons. Together with the half-knot set of current down the coast, these conditions would naturally alarm a medieval mariner used to sailing close to the land and having no knowledge of what lay ahead. In the end it was discovered that by sailing well out to sea—far out of sight of land—a more favorable wind could be picked up.

In addition, this is also believed to be the site where Captain James Riley and the crew of the U.S. brig Commerce, sailing at the time from Gibraltar towards the Cape Verde Islands, shipwrecked in August 1815. This tragedy is recounted in the Skeletons on the Zahara, by Dean King, which is set in this region of the African coast. King reports that any coastal map of Western Sahara is inaccurate because of the ever-changing physical features, due to the harsh conditions of the Sahara. It also mentions that the depth of the water surrounding Cape Bojador is deceptively shallow, and the color of the sand underneath the water is a "fearful sight". The cape had a fearsome reputation among mariners even prior to the wreck of the Commerce, as there had been at least thirty known shipwrecks between 1790 and 1806.

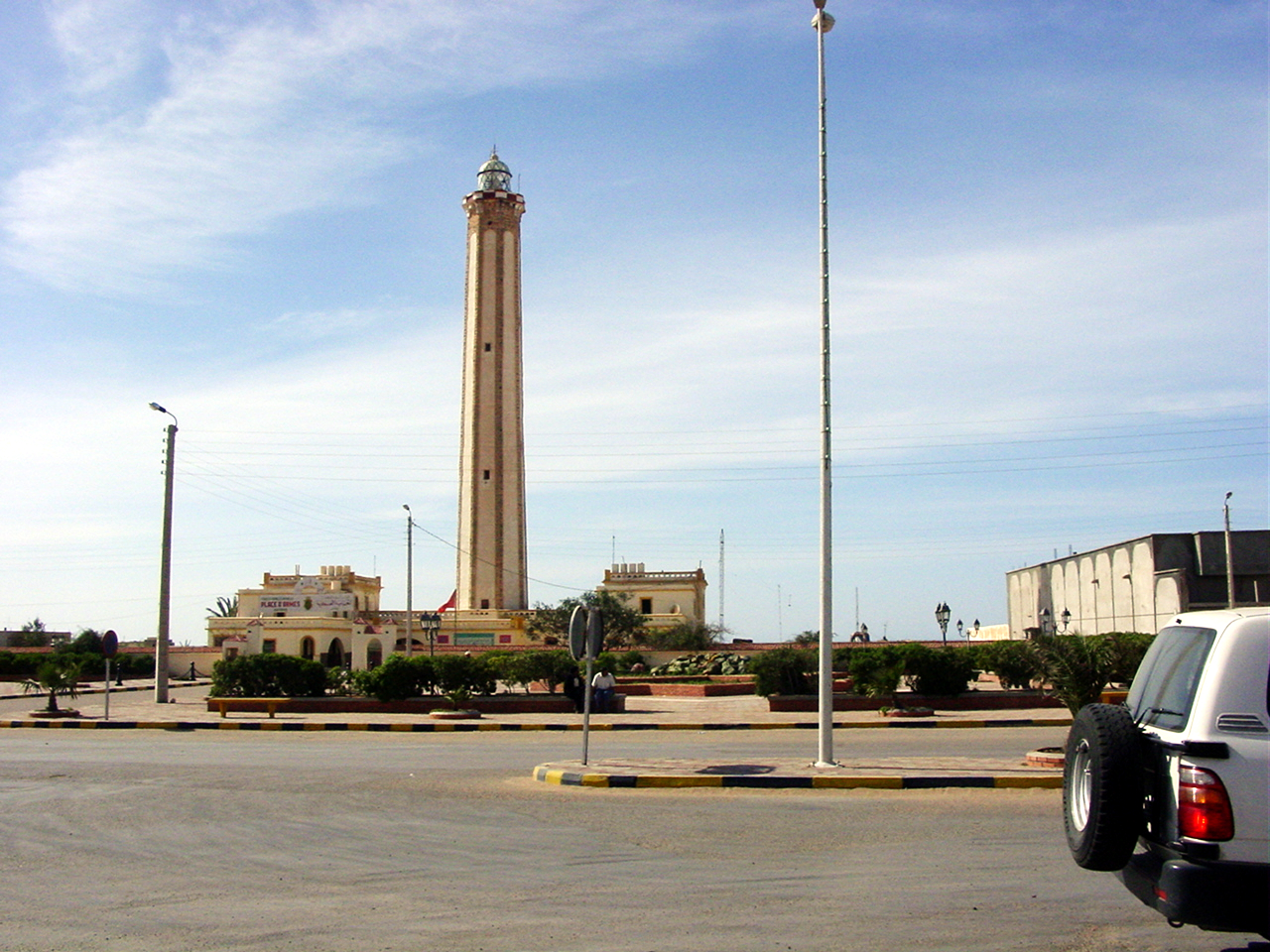
Boujdour Lighthouse and Moroccan military base in modern-day Boujdour

Sailors' fears were founded in what they saw, and the phenomena witnessed by the sailors of those days can be seen today. Any ship that has to pass those places makes sure to give a wide berth in order to avoid accidents. The reason for all this display is because Cape Bojador and its surrounding coast extends into the sea in the form of an underwater reef, and, when the waves break after crashing into unseen gullies, the water spouts furiously into high foamy clouds that look like steam, even on calm days. The sea in front to the Cape, and for approximately three miles from the coast and into the sea, is no more than six feet deep. Fish are abundant in the place, and shoals of sardines rise to the surface during the feeding times of larger fish. When this happens, the sea seems to bubble violently as if boiling, and, observed from a distance, the hissing sound produced by the fish flicking their tails on the water's surface adds to the impression that the water is boiling. The tremendous heat wafted westerly on lazy breezes from the desert heightens the impression of extreme temperature, to which the desert dust helps to create a mysterious darkness. Even the ferrous rocks make compass needles whirl erratically.

As recently as 2004, the British Royal Navy's publication Africa Pilot warns that nautical charts of the coastline in the area of Cape Bojador are "reported to be inaccurate".

== Ecological significance ==
The Spanish interest in the desert coast of Western Africa was the result of fishing activities carried out from the Canary Islands by Spanish fishermen.

Spanish fishers were seal fur traders and hunters, fishers and whalers off the Sahara coast with several enclaves in Cabo Bojador, Dakhla and Ras Nouadhibou from 1500 to present, extending from the west coast of Africa to hunting humpback whales and whale calves, mostly in Cape Verde, and the Gulf of Guinea in Annobón, São Tomé and Príncipe islands just to 1940. These fishing activities have had a negative impact on wildlife causing the disappearance or endangerment of many species, particularly marine mammals and birds. The former range of the Mediterranean monk seal (Monachus monachus) extended throughout the Northwest Atlantic coast of Africa and the Mediterranean and Black Sea coastlines, including all offshore islands of the Mediterranean, and into the Atlantic and its islands: Canary Islands, Madeira, Ilhas Desertas, Porto Santo, and others as far west as the Azores. Vagrants could be found as far south as Gambia and the Cape Verde islands, and as far north as continental Portugal and Atlantic France.

== In modern times ==
The Spanish originally claimed the land from 20° 51' N (near Cap Blanc) to 26° 8' N (near Cape Bojador) in 1885. This would be a protectorate governed from the Canary Islands in 1887. France would later claim the Western Sahara. The boundary was settled in a joint French-Spanish convention in 1900 to divide the area between Spanish Sahara and French West Africa.

Spain claimed a protectorate over the coastal region from Cap Blanc, far to the south of Cape Bojador, to a point about 200 km to the north in 1884. In 1975, as Spain pulled out following the Madrid Accords, Morocco sought to gain control over the area, leading to disputes between Morocco and the Polisario Front, the organization which proclaimed the Sahrawi Arab Democratic Republic in February 1976. In January 2016 it was announced that the Canary Association of Victims of Terrorism (ACAVITE) intended to sue the Polisario Front for committing "crimes against humanity".

In the Tindouf region of Algeria, Daira de Bojador is a refugee camp for Sahrawis named after Cape Bojador.

In December 2015, the bodies of 11 drowned migrants were found 147 kilometers off Cape Bojador. Earlier that same month, the Spanish coastguard rescued 47 African migrants in a boat off the coast of Gran Canaria.

== Notes ==
- Sailing Directions (Enroute), West Coast of Europe and Northwest Coast of Africa (Pub. 143) (Bethesda: National Geo-Spatial Intelligence Agency, 2005), p. 214, s.v. "Cabo Bojador."
- Charles Ralph Boxer, The Portuguese Seaborne Empire, 1415–1825 (London: Hutchinson and Co., 1969) [Caracanet, 1991], pp. 25–26.
- Atlas of Pilot Charts: North Atlantic Ocean (Washington: National Imagery and Mapping Agency, 2002).
- Carlos B. Carreiro (author), Portugal's Golden Years, The Life and Times of Prince Henry "The Navigator", (Dorrance Publishing Co, Inc), p. 64
