= Boujdour Province =

Boujdour إقليم بوجدور
- Province
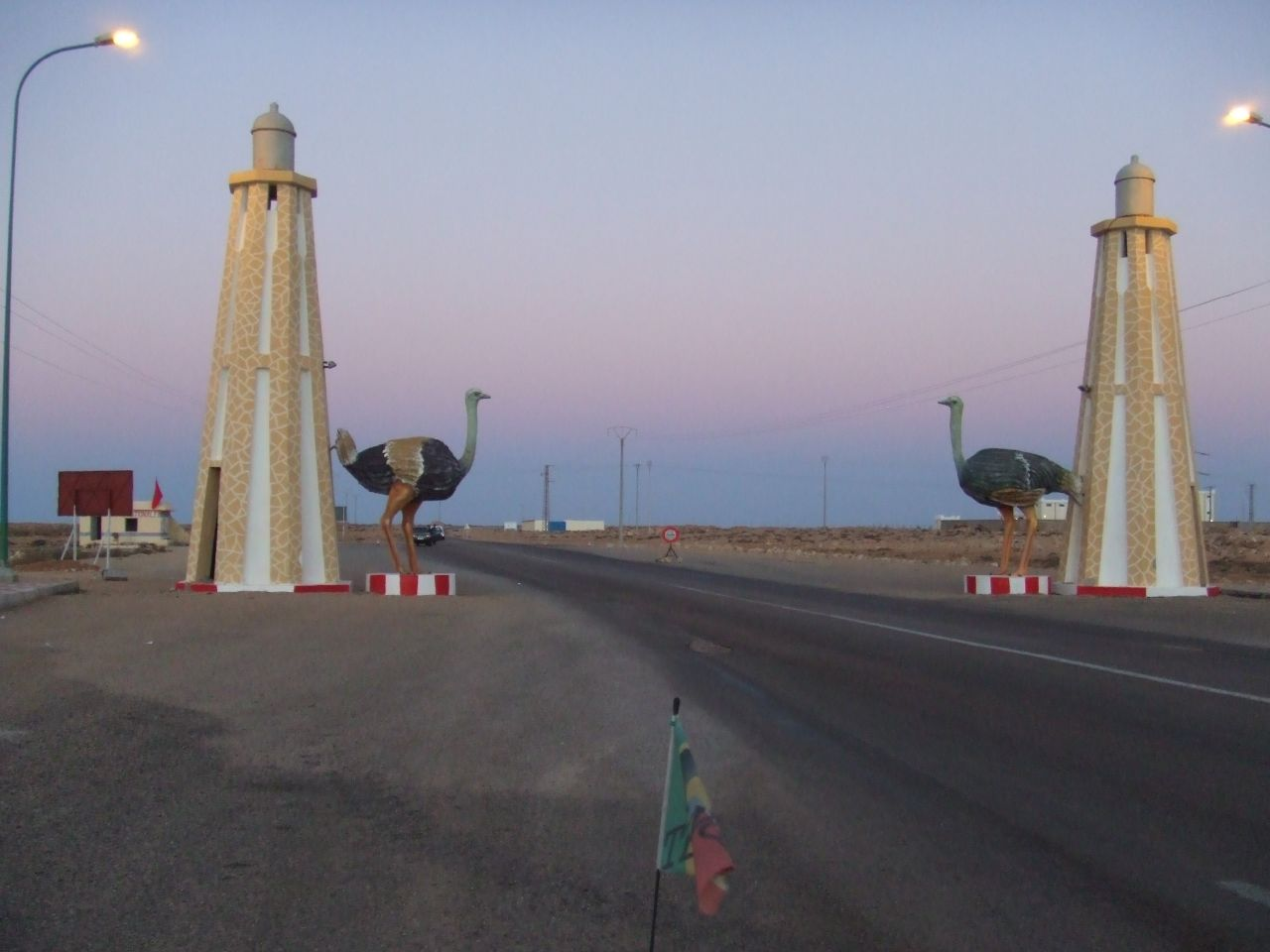
- Route N1 at the exit from Boujdour town

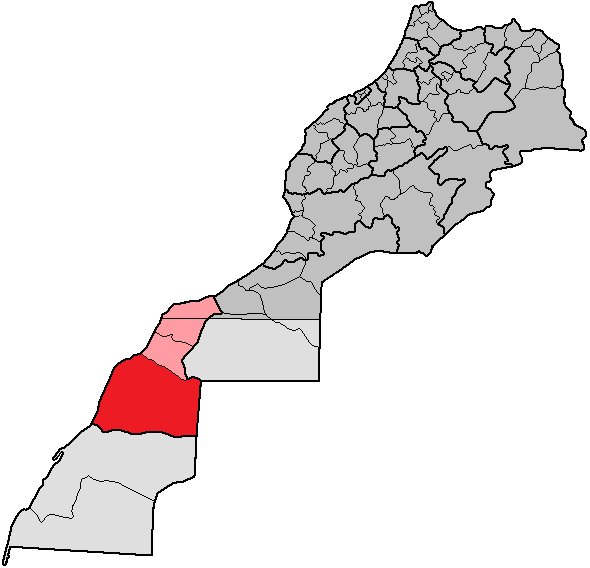
- Boujdour (red) in Morocco / Western Sahara

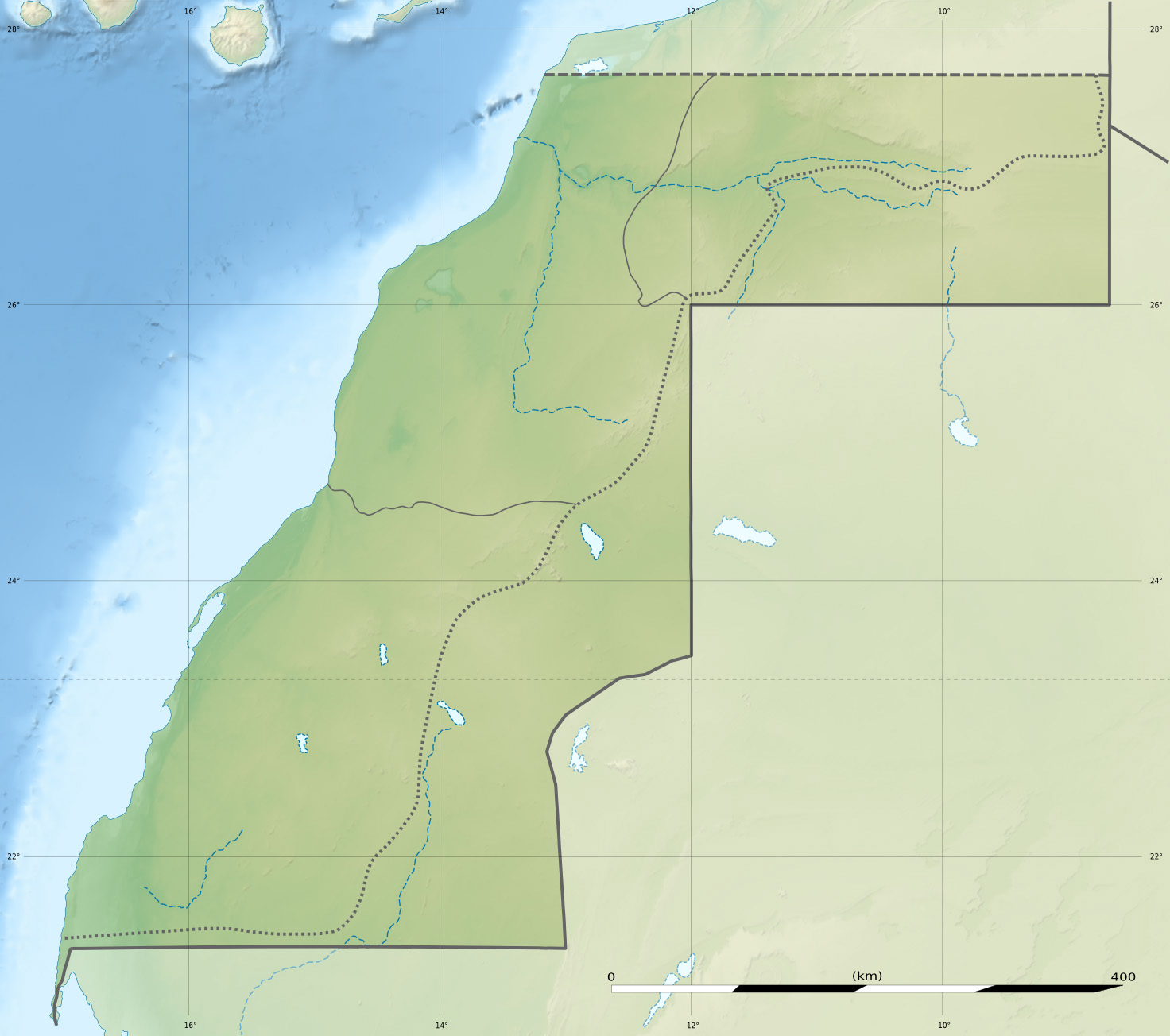
- Location in Western Sahara
- Coordinates: 26°08′N 14°30′W
- Country: Western Sahara
- Seat: Boujdour

Boujdour Province (Arabic: إقليم بوجدور; Spanish: Provincia de Bojador) is a province in the Moroccan-occupied region of Laâyoune-Sakia El Hamra, Western Sahara. Its population in 2004 was 46,129. Its major town is Boujdour.

Its territory, which is part of Western Sahara claimed by both Morocco and the Sahrawi Republic, has been occupied by Morocco since the mid-1970s.

== Location ==
The prefecture of Boujdour is located in the north of the region of Laâyoune-Sakia El Hamra. It covers an area of approximately 43,753 square kilometres (16,893 sq mi).

It is bordered by:

- Laâyoune and Es Semara provinces to the north
- Mauritania to the east
- Oued Ed-Dahab province to the south
- Atlantic Ocean to the west.

== History ==
The province of Boujdour was created by the dahir establishing the law of 6 August 1976, after the Green March of 1975 leading to the Madrid agreements which divided Western Sahara in two. The Spanish region of Seguia el-Hamra was entrusted to Morocco while that of Río de Oro to Mauritania. Like the provinces of Laâyoune and Es Semara, the province of Boujdour was created on 6 August 1976.

When it was created, the province of Boujdour had 2 circles which included 4 caïdats and the rural communes Bir Anzarane, Oum Dreyga, Boujdour and Gueltat Zemmour.

== Subdivisions ==
The province is divided administratively into the following:

Name	Geographic code	Type	Households	Population (2004)	Foreign population	Moroccan settlers	Notes
Boujdour	121.01.01.	Municipality	8416	36843	6	36837	
Guelta Zemmur	121.03.01.	Rural commune	95	6740	24	6716	
Jraifia	121.03.03.	Rural commune	380	1385	0	1385	
Lamssid	121.03.05.	Rural commune	292	1161	0	1161	

== Population ==
In 2014 the population was 50,566, of which 42,651 were urban and 7,915 were rural. The town of Boujdour had 42,651 inhabitants, Gueltat Zemmour had 6,383, Jraifa 950 and Lamssid 572. Population growth:

	2014	2004	1994	1982
Total	50,566	46,129	21,691	8,481
Urban	42,651	36,843	15,167	3,597
Rural	7,915	9,286	6,524	4,884

== Sources ==
- Annuaire Statistique Regional Laayoune - Sakia el Hamra (in French), Rotaume de Maric Haut-Commissariat au Plan, 2015
