= Battle of Smara (1979) =

Event occurred during Sahara War at Smara

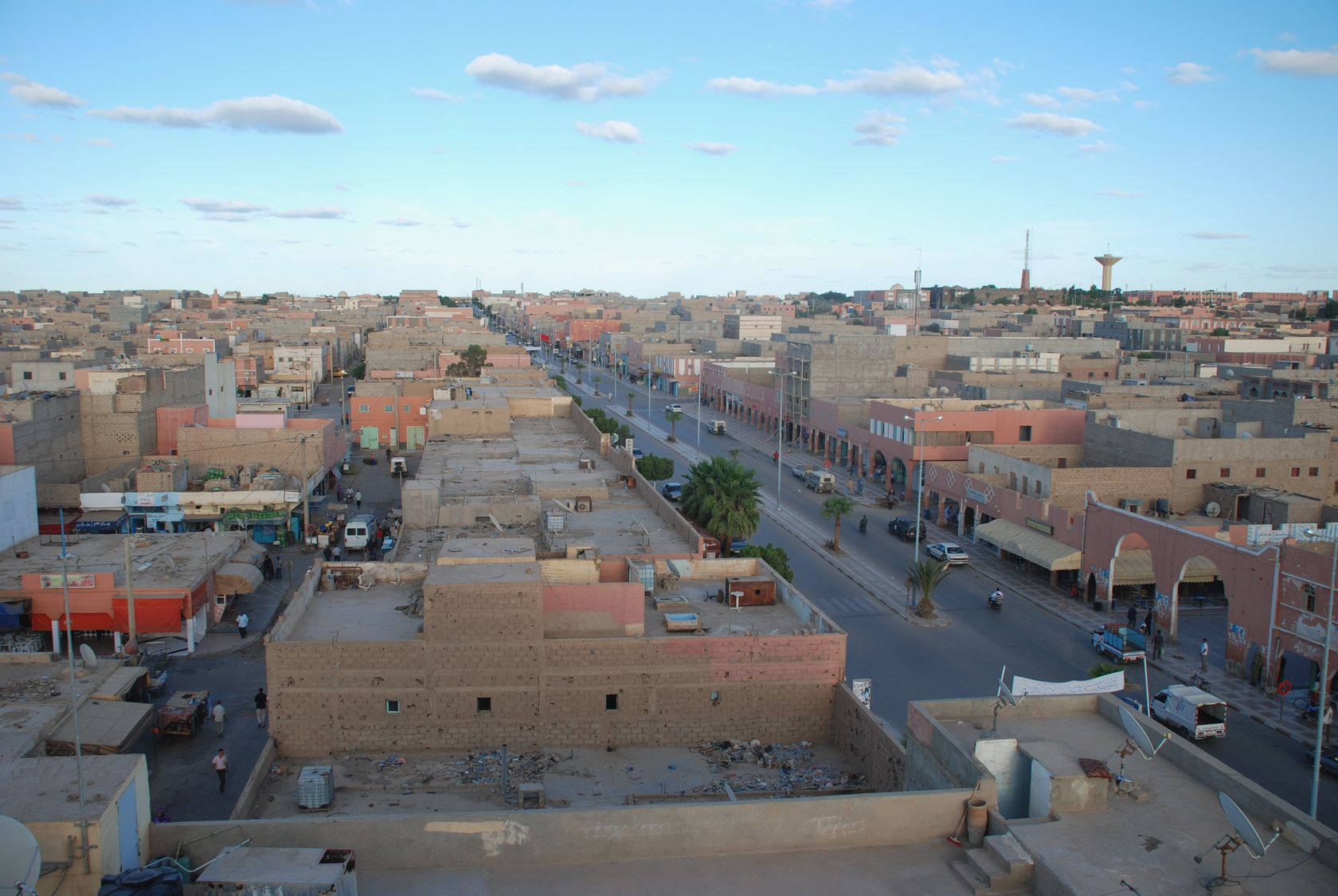
- Smara in 2010.
Date	October 5–8, 1979
Location	Smara, Western Sahara 26°44′22″N 11°40′13″W

Belligerents
Sahrawi Arab Democratic Republic; Polisario Front	Morocco

Commanders and leaders
(Sahrawi Arab Democratic Republic) Driss El Harti †	Unknown

Units involved
(Sahrawi Arab Democratic Republic) 2,000 to 6,000 troops; 400 vehicles	(Morocco) 5,400 troops; a dozen Mirage F1 and F-5E aircraft

Casualties and losses
According to Morocco: (Sahrawi Arab Democratic Republic) 1,085 dead; and 194 to 250 vehicles	According to Morocco: 121 dead, wounded and prisoners. (Note: Clodfelter 2017, p. 555) According to the Polisario: 1,269 dead; 1,200 wounded or missing; 42 prisoners; and 3 aircraft set on fire
- Location within Western Sahara

The Battle of Smara occurred between October 5 and 8, 1979, during the Western Sahara War at Smara, between the Royal Moroccan Armed Forces and the Polisario Front. Both sides asserted divergent narratives of the battle.

The Polisario Front, a political movement demanding the independence of Western Sahara, initiated armed conflict with Mauritanian and Moroccan neighbors as early as 1975. This conflict arose from the Green March and the Madrid Accords, which divided the territory between the two countries. The independence fighters concentrated their efforts on the weak link of the alliance, Mauritania, until its neutralization in the conflict in 1978. In 1979, they launched a deadly offensive against Morocco, forcing it to abandon several localities in the eastern part of the territory.

Smara, a holy city and the second-largest town in Western Sahara, was of paramount importance politically and strategically. Losing this city would be a catastrophe for Morocco. Throughout the year, the city was subjected to repeated harassment, and before the battle, it was encircled with significant defenses.

The Polisario columns commenced an intensive bombardment of Moroccan positions from the night of the 5th, followed by an assault on Smara the next day. This assault penetrated the city from the southeast. The fighting was intense, at times involving hand-to-hand combat. The intervention of the Moroccan air force, using the newly acquired Mirage F1s from France, significantly altered the battle's outcome, compelling the Polisario forces to retreat.

All sources concur that this was the most violent battle since the inception of the conflict, with both parties claiming to have killed over 1,000 adversaries. In their retreat, Polisario fighters rescued over 716 Sahrawi civilians and captured 42 Moroccan prisoners.

== Background ==
=== Historical Context ===
Spain's colonization of Western Sahara started in 1884, but its legitimacy was established after the Berlin Conference. The territory was inhabited by nomadic Arab-Berber tribes that were hostile to the presence of Europeans. As early as 1885, the Moorish religious leader Ma El Aïnin called for a holy war against the French and Spanish colonizers in the region. Morocco armed and financed him in exchange for recognizing its sovereignty over Spanish Sahara and Mauritania. He led the resistance until his death on October 23, 1910, in Tiznit. (Note: Gaudio 1993, p. 246)

In 1912, a Franco-Spanish protectorate was swiftly established over Morocco. Spain could finally consolidate its control over the territories of Río de Oro and Seguia el-Hamra, as well as northern Morocco, Cap Juby, and the enclave of Ifni. Morocco regained its independence in 1956. The French protectorate was terminated, while the Northern zone of the Spanish protectorate was returned. From that point onward, driven by nationalists such as Allal El Fassi and his Istiqlal Party, the reconstitution of territorial integrity to establish a "Greater Morocco," which would include Mauritania, part of Mali, part of the Algerian Sahara, and Western Sahara, became a primary goal. From 1957 onwards, Morocco provided financial and military support to the National Liberation Army (ALN), which had emerged in the Rif and Middle Atlas between 1953 and 1955. The ALN initiated the Ifni War by launching attacks against the Spanish occupiers in Ifni, Cap Juby, and Western Sahara, as well as against the French in Tindouf and Mauritania. Operation Écouvillon, initiated on February 10, 1958, jointly by French and Spanish armies, ultimately vanquished the ALN fighters, who were compelled to retreat northward. In Ifni, all Spanish posts were captured by the Moroccans, except for the capital, Sidi Ifni. On April 2, 1958, an agreement was reached between the Spanish government and Morocco, resulting in the return of Cap Juby to Morocco. In 1969, Sidi Ifni was also handed over to Morocco, following United Nations resolution 2072 (1965), which called for the decolonization of Ifni and Western Sahara. However, Spain still refused to relinquish Western Sahara.

The Polisario Front, established on April 29, 1973, in Zouerate, Mauritania, initiated its inaugural actions against Spanish military installations in the Sahara. Meanwhile, Morocco, which had laid claim to Western Sahara as early as the late King Mohammed V's visit to M'Hamid El Ghizlane in 1958, continued to advocate for the Spanish withdrawal, while Mauritania also began to express interest in the territory. On October 16, 1975, the International Court of Justice issued an advisory opinion that reaffirmed the historical ties between the populations of Western Sahara and Morocco, as well as the Mauritanian entity. Nevertheless, the opinion concluded that these ties were not sufficient to prevent a self-determination referendum, deeming the notion of terra nullius inapplicable. In the days that followed, King Hassan II of Morocco initiated the Green March (November 6, 1975), an action that led to the partition of the territory between Morocco and Mauritania by the terms of the Madrid Accords on November 14. (Note: Pointier 2004, p. 100) Meanwhile, under the orders of Ahmed Dlimi, the Moroccan army captured the localities of Jdiriya, Haouza, and Farsia, resulting in the first clashes between Moroccan forces and Sahrawi independence fighters.

Partition of the former Spanish Sahara between Mauritania and Morocco in January 1976.

On November 27, Moroccan troops advanced on Smara, despite opposition from the Polisario. Laâyoune was subsequently occupied by Moroccan forces on December 11. Mauritania assumed control of the southern portion of the Río de Oro. Algeria attempted to intervene directly in the conflict up until the events at Amgala in early 1976. (Note: Berramdane 1992, p. 117) On February 24, 1976, the Polisario proclaimed the independence of the Sahrawi Arab Democratic Republic. The independence fighters persisted in their harassment of the Moroccan army, but concentrated their principal attacks on the Mauritanian military, inflicting significant damage to the Mauritanian economy with persistent raids on Zouerate, the economic hub of Mauritania, throughout 1977 and 1978. The frequency of the raids increased until the overthrow of Moktar Ould Daddah's regime on July 10, 1978, by a collective that favored the Polisario, which concluded the war. The independence fighters' sole objective was now the destruction of Morocco. (Note: Bontems 1984, p. 187)

=== Military situation for Morocco ===
Military situation in Western Sahara in early October 1979. Morocco lost control of a large part of eastern Western Sahara.

The Houari-Boumédiène offensive, named after the late Algerian president Houari Boumédiène, a key supporter of the independence fighters, commenced on January 13, 1979, with the participation of Polisario fighters. In 1979, the attacks on Moroccan garrisons conducted by the independence fighters were particularly deadly. The fighters no longer hesitated to mobilize large numbers of troops and significant equipment for deadly assaults deep into uncontested Moroccan territory. In response to the "attacks by Morocco" in Western Sahara, the Polisario considered it their right to attack Moroccan territory.

The Battle of Tan-Tan, which involved 1,700 combatants and 200 vehicles belonging to the Sahrawi Arab Democratic Republic, proved to be a significant political victory for the Polisario Front. This turn of events prompted a re-evaluation of the capabilities and strategic approach of the Royal Moroccan Armed Forces among the Moroccan populace and political elite. (Note: Santucci 1979, p. 407) Subsequent deadly incursions occurred in June on Assa and Tan-Tan, once again in uncontested Moroccan territory.

On August 5, 1979, Mauritania declared a unilateral ceasefire against the Polisario Front due to a military coup that had overthrown former president Moktar Ould Daddah a year earlier. The costly war had severely damaged the Mauritanian economy, leading Mauritania to abandon the southern Río de Oro, which was immediately annexed by Morocco. The Moroccan army proceeded to invest in the Southern part of the Sahara and promptly commenced the process of securing the area. However, the Polisario independence fighters were also engaged in action. On August 11, the Sahrawis initiated a significant attack with 2,500 to 3,000 fighters and 500 vehicles on Bir Anzarane. The attack was designed to provide the Polisario with access to the Río de Oro, particularly Dakhla. The Polisario forces were repelled at the cost of heavy losses on the Moroccan side. In retaliation for the annexation of the Río de Oro, the Polisario Front launched a new series of deadly attacks in uncontested Moroccan territory. The Moroccan army suffered a decisive defeat on August 24 at Lebouirate, where the base of the 3rd Armored Squadron Group was dismantled by the independence fighters, who captured a significant quantity of military equipment, including armored vehicles, and took numerous prisoners. Nearly 5,000 Polisario fighters participated in the battle. On September 16, the independence fighters launched a deadly attack on Lemgat in the vicinity of the stronghold of Zag, resulting in significant casualties among the Moroccan army.

The military situation presents a significant challenge for Morocco, which continues to face difficulties in securing its territory against incursions by the Sahrawis. The Polisario employs its mobility and familiarity with the terrain to launch rapid assaults on garrisons and towns. The Royal Armed Forces (FAR) are unable to pursue the Sahrawis when they retreat to their sanctuary in Tindouf, Algeria. The Moroccan military is hindered by its dispersion across a territory that is approximately half the size of France. This reduces its capacity to engage in combat and to provide logistical support. A significant number of localities have been abandoned to the Polisario due to the continuous harassment and the difficulty of defending and supplying them. In April 1977, Farsia was liberated; in October 1977, Haouza was similarly freed; in March 1978, Bir Lahlou was liberated; in late March 1979, Tifariti was liberated; in April 1979, Amgala was liberated; (Note: Ali 1997, p. 154) (Note: Barbier 1982, p. 282) and in June 1979, Jdiriya was liberated. Although these liberations did not result in a permanent occupation, they confirmed Morocco's retreat, which now controls only a few towns. (Note: Weexsteen 1980, p. 426) On September 24, Sahrawi Defense Minister Brahim Ghali alluded to the imminence of "new and important operations," yet most observers postulated that the subsequent target would be Zag. Throughout 1979, Smara was subjected to repeated harassment. The city was the site of multiple attacks in May, (Note: Weexsteen 1980, p. 434) as well as on July 19, (Note: Weexsteen 1980, p. 437) and on September 4 and 5. (Note: Weexsteen 1980, p. 438)

=== Importance of Smara ===
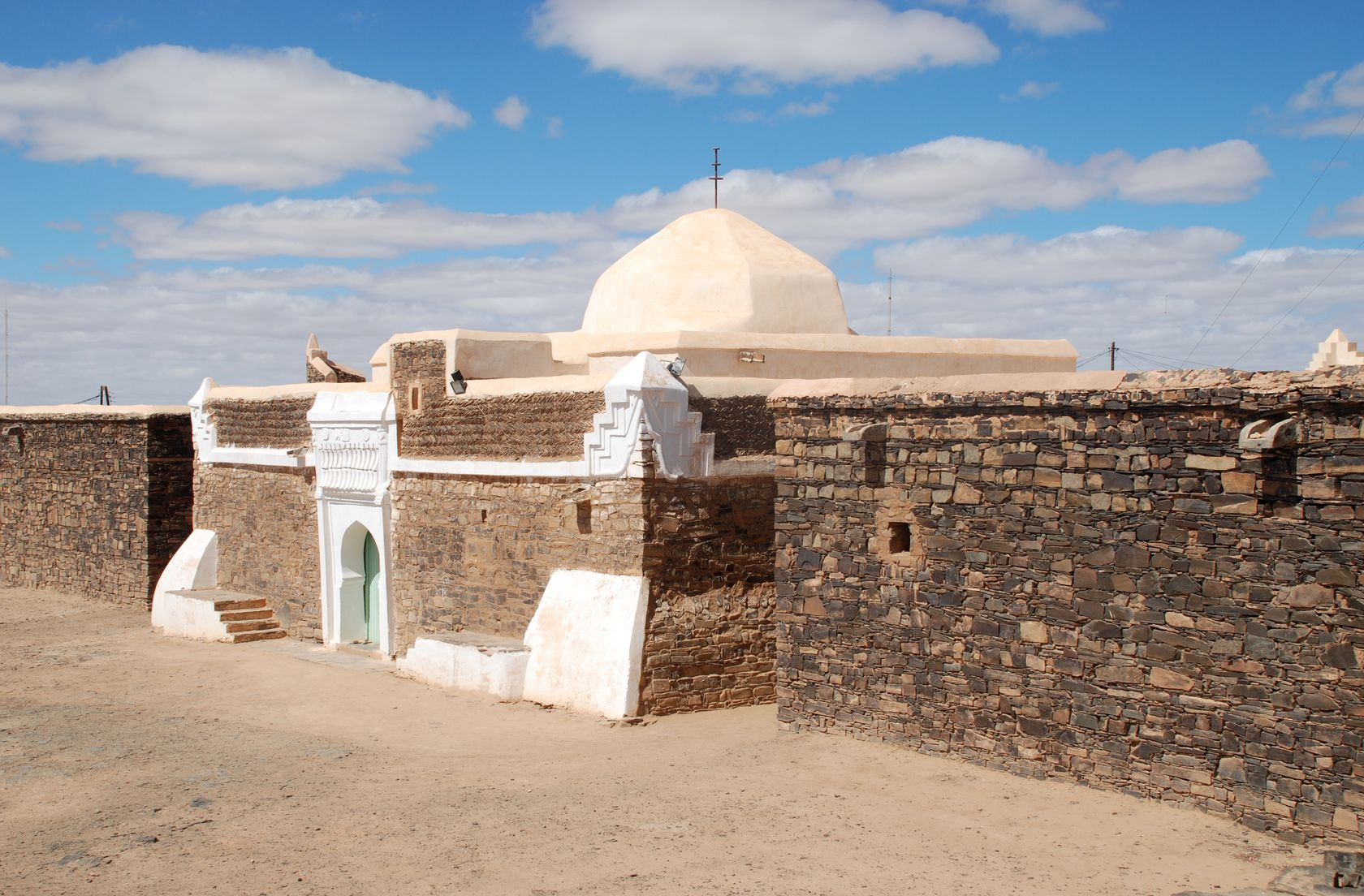
Zaouiat Cheikh Ma El Ainine, Smara.

The city had two significant roles: strategic and political. Smara is the holy city of Western Sahara, founded by Sheikh Ma El Aïnin, a prominent figure in the region's history known for leading the holy war against the colonizers. Morocco's claim to Western Sahara is partly based on Sheikh Ma El Aïnin, who accepted the kingdom's assistance in fighting the French in exchange for recognizing its sovereignty over Western Sahara and Mauritania. The city is situated in the center of the Seguia el-Hamra province, approximately 150 km east of Laâyoune and 250 km west of the Algerian border. Smara is located at a crossroads where desert routes converge, from east to west from Tindouf to Laâyoune and from north to south from Morocco to Bir Moghreïn and Atar in Mauritania. Furthermore, Smara is situated within the "useful triangle" of Laâyoune, Smara, and Boukraa, where the Boukraa phosphate mines are located. The world's longest conveyor belt, spanning 96 km, transports phosphate production from the mines to the port of Laâyoune.

Smara, the second-largest town in Western Sahara, had a population of 8,000 before the war began. At that time, the region exhibited minimal urbanization, as most Sahrawis were nomadic. Moroccan troops, under the command of Colonel Ahmed Dlimi, invaded the city on November 27, 1975, following the Green March and the Madrid Accords, despite opposition from the Polisario.

== Forces in presence ==
=== Moroccan army ===
In September 1978, the Royal Armed Forces had a total strength of 80,000 men and 60 combat aircraft. (Note: Ali 1997, p. 151) The city of Smara was defended by a regiment of 5,400 Moroccan soldiers, under the command of sector commander Colonel Driss El Harti. Colonel Mohamed Ghoujdami, the commander of the 6th RIM, asserted that the Smara garrison was inferior to the attackers in terms of numerical strength and firepower. Nevertheless, the city was well fortified with substantial defensive positions encircling it at a depth of 10 to 14 kilometers, while the hills surrounding the city were also fortified. The garrison possessed a considerable number of armored vehicles. (Note: Bidwell 1998, p. 444)

Previously, the Moroccan army had only used American Northrop F-5s. However, under the administration of Valéry Giscard d'Estaing, France delivered twenty units of the Mirage F1, representing a portion of the fifty aircraft ordered. The Polisario became quickly aware of this acquisition and did not hesitate to inform the press through its defense minister, Brahim Ghali. Ghali reported the presence of three Mirage F1s at the Smara airfield twenty days before the battle, denouncing France's support for Morocco. The Mirage F1 is a single-seat combat aircraft equipped for ground attack with two cannons firing twenty-seven shells and capable of carrying fourteen 250 kg bombs, one hundred and forty-four rockets, or guided air-to-ground missiles. Over a dozen Mirage F1 and F-5E aircraft, mainly based in Laâyoune, participated in the combat.

=== Polisario forces ===
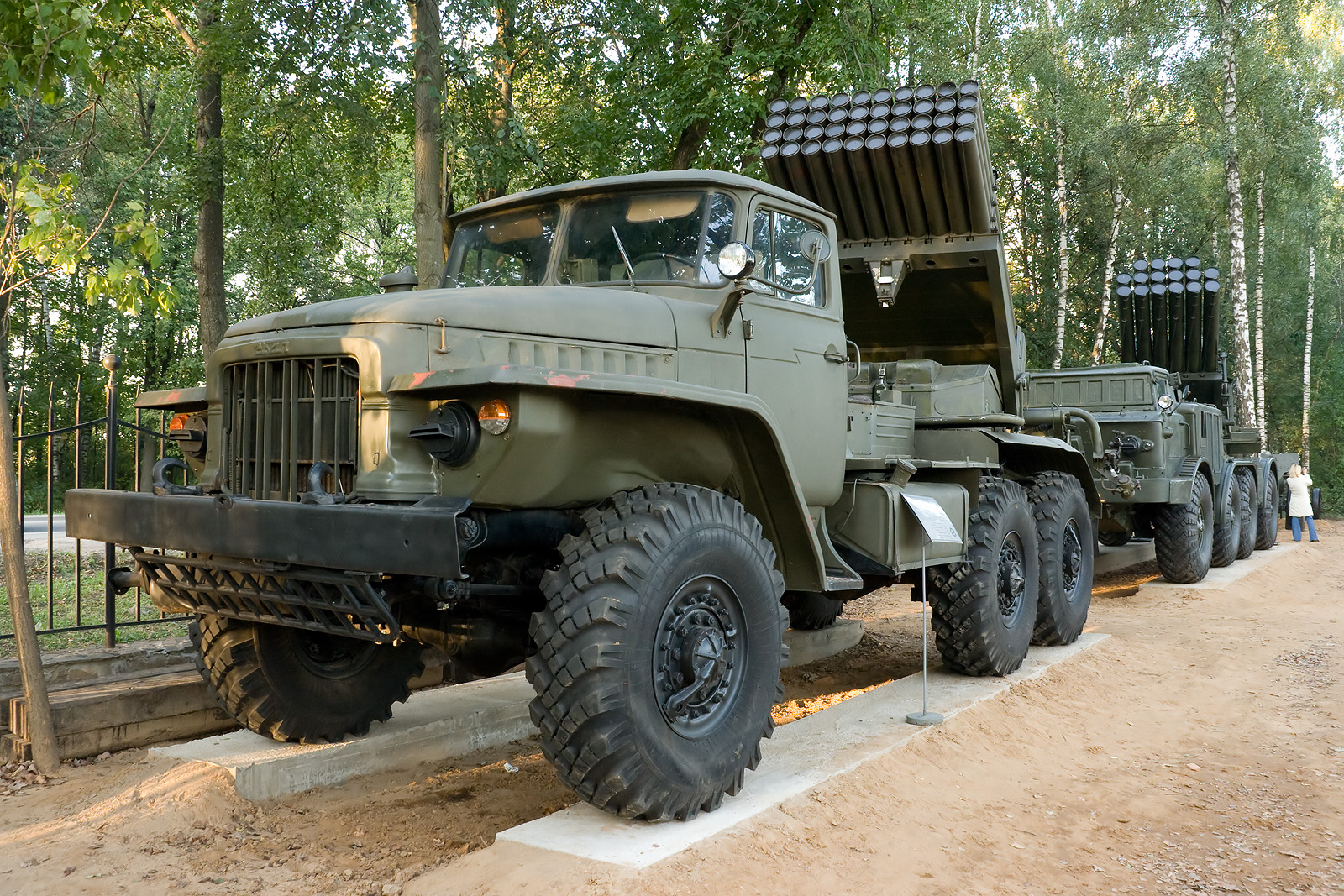
Stalin's organs, one of the Polisario's favorite weapons.

The Sahrawi People's Liberation Army had a total strength of approximately 10,000 to 20,000 men. (Note: Vermeren 2010, p. Chapter 6) For this battle, the Polisario used a significant portion of its military forces, a substantial column estimated to comprise between 2,000 and 6,000 men, and at least 400 vehicles, including Land Rovers, Toyotas, and armored vehicles. The precise number of Sahrawi fighters is uncertain. Colonel Mohamed Ghoujdami estimated the number of men at 4,000 to 5,000. The Sahrawis were equipped with a diverse array of weaponry, including Soviet, Czech, and Chinese arms. The Polisario used Soviet-made weaponry, particularly 120 mm, 122 mm, and 160 mm caliber weapons with ranges of 11 to 13 miles. These weapons included the 9K32 Strela-2 and other anti-aircraft weapons. Additionally, the independence fighters were armed with Soviet machine guns, Kalashnikovs, and submachine guns.

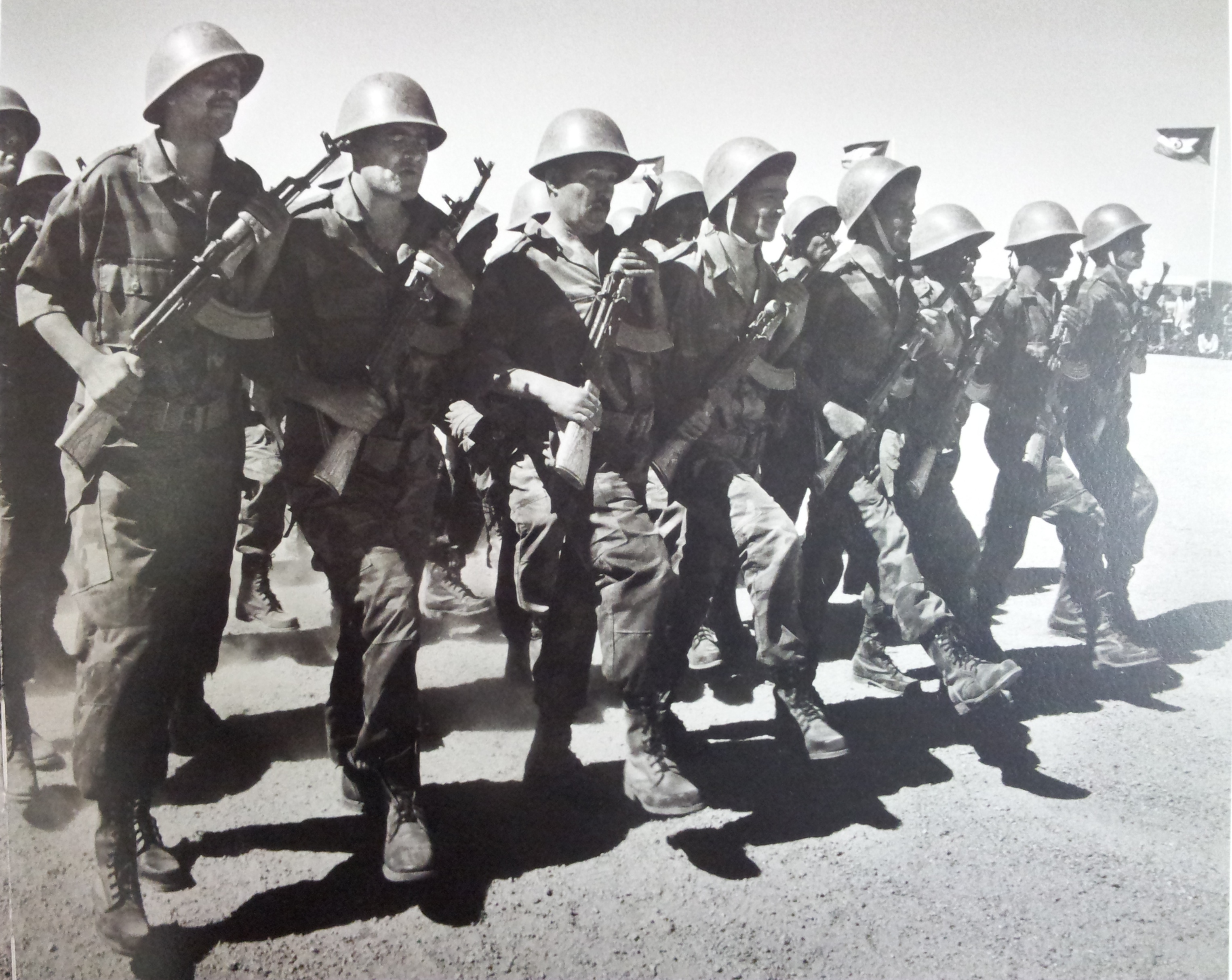
Polisario Front soldiers on parade in 1980.

The Polisario's armament was primarily sourced from Algeria, which also provided 122 mm cannons, all necessary fuel, and the rear base of Tindouf. Libya, meanwhile, supplied troop carriers, missiles, rockets, and light weapons (AK-47, AKM, PKM). (Note: Ali 1997, p. 148)

== Course of events ==
The Polisario Front initiated a diversionary attack at dawn on October 5, 1979, on Zag, resulting in the deaths of approximately one hundred Moroccan soldiers and the destruction of two forward posts. The objective was to impede the operations of this significant garrison and disperse the Moroccan soldiers, while the primary target was Smara.

The Battle of Smara commenced on the night of October 5. The Polisario fighters, confronted with significant defensive positions encircling the city to a depth of 10 to 14 kilometers, initiated an artillery barrage on Moroccan positions, using 122 mm rocket launchers and firing over 1,700 rockets, according to some Moroccan officers. At dawn on October 6, at 6 am, three columns of independence fighters initiated an attack on Moroccan positions from three sides of the city. Concurrently, other units were engaged in countering a potential counteroffensive and the arrival of Moroccan reinforcements from other towns. Two hours before the commencement of the attack, the Polisario fighters were identified and prevented from advancing by a line of outposts. Colonel Driss El Harti, the commanding officer of the garrison, was killed during the initial combat phase. (Note: Besenyő 2009, p. 123) Mohamed Ali Ould Sidi Bechir, the Smara deputy who had joined the Polisario and was present during the fighting, stated that the Sahrawi fighters had managed to breach three protective belts of the city on the southeast side and had entered the city by 6:30 am. (Note: Weexsteen 1980, p. 427) The Moroccan forces demonstrated resilience during this initial phase of intense combat, with hand-to-hand combat occurring at select positions. According to the Moroccan garrison, the Sahrawi forces sustained approximately 350 fatalities and lost 50 vehicles during this first day of combat.

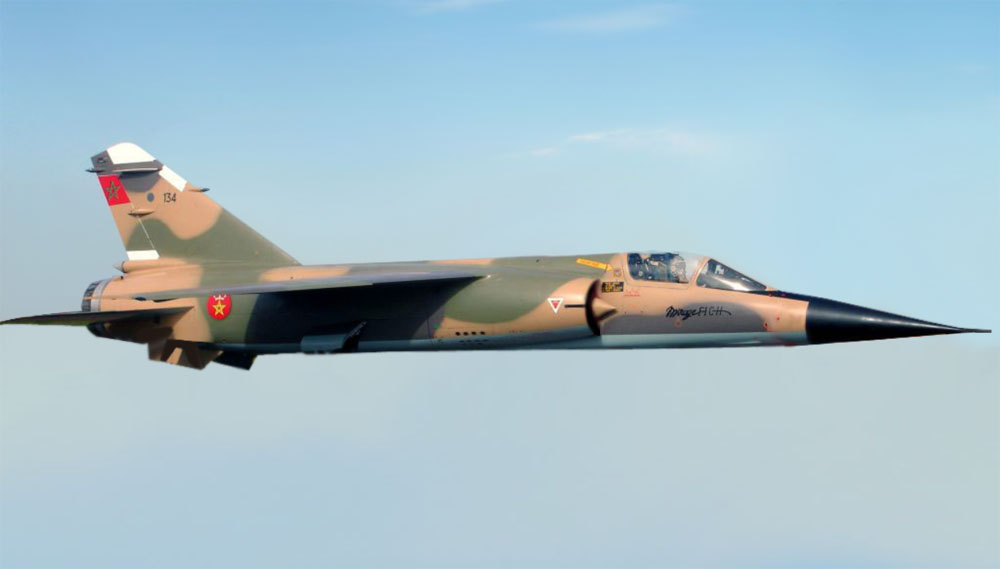
The Dassault Mirage F1 played a decisive role in the Moroccan victory.

The intervention of Mirage F1 jets during the night of Saturday, October 6 to Sunday, October 7 proved decisive. Previous battles had demonstrated the effectiveness of night attacks for the Sahrawis, as the Moroccan air force could not operate in the dark. In this instance, the Moroccans launched night air attacks for the first time, surprising the Polisario columns. The independence fighters were disconcerted by the combined artillery and air attacks, and their retreat became a rout. The Sahrawis, equipped with Strela-2 and other anti-aircraft weapons, attempted to shoot down the Moroccan planes, demonstrating the external support and sophisticated equipment the Polisario had.

Nevertheless, on the night of Sunday, October 7 to Monday, October 8, the Polisario Front announced that the city had fallen into the hands of its fighters and that the Moroccan army had suffered heavy losses. Additionally, the Front asserted that many Moroccan reinforcements were heading to the city. Moroccan authorities promptly denied the city's fall but acknowledged that Smara, the second-largest town in Western Sahara, was "harassed" by the Polisario. Subsequently, the Polisario retracted its assertion of control over the city. The conflict concluded during the day, with the independence fighters' assault repelled by Moroccan soldiers.

Moroccan military officials were able to ascertain that some Polisario units had originated from positions situated close to the Mauritanian border, a mere 40 kilometers away. As the Polisario elements were retreating to their positions after the fighting, they were pursued by Moroccan aviation, which bombed them and made the passage from Smara to Tifariti, from where Sahrawi reinforcements were dispatched, difficult.

== Outcome and consequences ==
This was the most violent battle since the beginning of the conflict. It marked a new level of escalation in the war. An official statement from the Moroccan Ministry of Information confirmed the extreme violence of the fighting, emphasizing the decisive intervention of the air force, which changed the outcome of the battle. The planes used were mainly Mirage F1s, sold to Morocco by France under Valéry Giscard d'Estaing. The Mirages operated at night and targeted both units in the city and Polisario reinforcements.

The American newspaper The Christian Science Monitor has reported that the Battle of Smara was a decisive victory for the Royal Moroccan Air Force. Moroccan pilots demonstrated their ability to operate the sophisticated Mirage F1, which they praised for its superior performance compared to the older American Northrop F-5E aircraft.

As historian Pierre Vermeren notes, both sides claimed to have killed over 1,000 adversaries. (Note: Vermeren 2010, p. La guerre avec l'Algérie puis avec le Polisario) However, these reports have been deemed unreliable by specialists. The Moroccan government, via the Ministry of Information, asserted that Moroccan military forces had inflicted unparalleled casualties upon the assailants. The Ministry of Information reported that Polisario losses numbered over 1,085 dead and 194 vehicles destroyed, while 121 Moroccan soldiers were killed or injured. Other reports indicated that the Sahrawis lost 250 vehicles. The Polisario, in particular, expressed regret over the loss of several BM-21 Grad rocket launchers. (Note: Merini 2000, p. 438) According to Colonel Mohamed Ghoujdami, the Polisario lost between three and four hundred men in Smara itself and about six hundred others in the attack on their column by Moroccan aviation.

The Polisario Front, characterizing the operation as a "historic event," reported significant losses for Morocco. According to their account, over 1,269 Moroccan soldiers were killed, 1,200 were wounded or missing, dozens were captured, and three aircraft were destroyed. Additionally, they asserted that a considerable quantity of weapons, military vehicles, ammunition, and fuel was either destroyed or recovered. The Polisario also claimed to have destroyed the city's airport. A total of 716 Sahrawi civilians were "liberated" by the Polisario and relocated to refugee camps in Tindouf, including Smara deputy Mohamed Ali Ould Sidi Bechir.

The attack by the Polisario Front had significant political implications. The liberation of 716 Sahrawis constituted a significant political victory. Firstly, it was demonstrated that the Polisario fighters had successfully gained access to the city. Secondly, on October 12, 1979, the 42 Moroccan soldiers captured and the 716 Sahrawi civilians rescued during the battle were presented to the "French Friendship Association with the SADR" and the foreign press. (Note: Weexsteen 1980, p. 440) Moreover, the defection of the Smara deputy constituted a significant setback for Morocco, as the individual had been presented to the inquiry commission of the Organization of African Unity a few months earlier as a Sahrawi who was firmly convinced of his Moroccan identity.

On October 16, approximately twenty diplomats and thirty Moroccan and foreign journalists visited Smara. Upon inspection, only one impact was visible on the city's airport control tower, while the runway remained functional. The city itself appeared undamaged. Additionally, Moroccan authorities displayed some of the Polisario's losses in the conflict, including 17 damaged Land Rover vehicles, debris from Stalin's organs, 120 mm Czech and Soviet rockets, a Soviet machine gun, 75 mm Chinese shell containers, and Kalashnikov rifles, some of which originated from Libya. In 2012, Sahrawi activists observed that this battle was one of the most costly for the Sahrawi People's Liberation Army. The Moroccans also presented the journalists with the body of an uncircumcised man with "Asian features," which was discovered in the sand.

During their retreat to Algeria, a contingent of the Sahrawi forces, comprising approximately ten units of the Polisario and 1,200 men, (Note: Ali 1997, p. 153) overpowered the garrison at Mahbes, which was defended by a battalion of the 14th Motorized Infantry Regiment, comprising 780 men. According to the Spanish daily El País, the battle which pitted 600 to 1,200 Moroccan soldiers against 2,000 to 4,000 Polisario fighters was a significant defeat for Morocco. The Spanish newspaper reports that Morocco lost an entire battalion and four hundred tons of weapons. Moreover, Mahbès represented the last remaining area of Moroccan control between Smara and the Algerian border. "Its strategic importance lies in its ability to prevent Polisario infiltrations into the Sahara."

== Bibliography ==
- Ali, Lyakat (1997). "Military dimension of Western Sahara Conflict". The Western Sahara issue-decolonisation or greater Morocco. New Delhi: Jawaharlal Nehru University. hdl:10603/17005. Archived from the original on May 10, 2023.
- Barbier, Maurice (1982). Le Conflit du Sahara occidental (in French). Paris: L'Harmattan. ISBN 2-85802-197-X. Archived from the original on December 29, 2024.
- Berramdane, Abdelkhaleq (1992). Le Sahara occidental, enjeu maghrébin (in French). KARTHALA Editions. ISBN 978-2-86537-352-9. Archived from the original on July 26, 2021.
- Besenyő, János (2009). Western Sahara (PDF). Publikon Publishers. ISBN 978-963-88332-0-4. Archived from the original on April 6, 2024.
- Bidwell, Robin Leonard (1998). "Western Sahara War". Dictionary of modern Arab history : an A to Z of over 2,000 entries from 1798 to the present day. Kegan Paul International. pp. 443–445. ISBN 9780710305053. Archived from the original on May 29, 2018.
- Bontems, Claude (1984). La guerre du Sahara occidental (in French). Presses Universitaires de France. ISBN 978-2-13-038358-1. Archived from the original on June 26, 2024.
- Clodfelter, Micheal (2017). "Polisario rebellion: 1976–1988". Warfare and Armed Conflicts: A Statistical Encyclopedia of Casualty and Other Figures, 1492–2015 (4th ed.). McFarland. pp. 555–556. ISBN 978-0-7864-7470-7. Archived from the original on May 27, 2018.
- Dean, David (1986). "Morocco-Polisario war : a case study of a modern low-intensity conflict". The Air Force Role in Low-Intensity Conflict, (PDF). Alabama: Air University. pp. 29–54. ISBN 1-58566-014-0.
- Gaudio, Attilio (1993). Les populations du Sahara occidental : histoire, vie et culture (in French). KARTHALA Editions. ISBN 978-2-84586-434-4. Archived from the original on June 26, 2024.
- Hodges, Tony (1983). Western Sahara : The Roots of a Desert War. L. Hill. ISBN 978-0-88208-152-6.
- Jensen, Geoffrey (2013). War and Insurgency in the Western Sahara. United States Army War College Press. ISBN 978-1-58487-569-7. Archived from the original (PDF) on November 15, 2021.
- Merini, Abdelhak El (2000). الجيش المغربي عبر التاريخ [L'Armée marocaine à travers l'Histoire] (in Arabic). Rabat: Dar Nachr Al Maârifa. pp. 437–438. ISBN 9981-808-42-3. Archived from the original on May 9, 2021.
- Pennell, C. R (2000). Morocco since 1830 : a history. New York: New York University Press. ISBN 0-8147-6676-5.
- Pointier, Laurent (2004). Sahara occidental : la controverse devant les Nations Unies (in French). KARTHALA Editions. ISBN 978-2-84586-434-4. Archived from the original on May 25, 2023.
- Santucci, Jean-Claude (1979). "Chronique politique Maroc". Annuaire de l'Afrique du Nord (in French). 1978. CNRS Éditions: 385–409. Archived from the original on June 5, 2018.
- Vermeren, Pierre (2010). "D'Ahmed Dlimi à Driss Basri, le Maroc des « années de plomb » (1975-1990)". Histoire du Maroc depuis l'indépendance. Repères/Histoire (in French). Paris: La Découverte. pp. 71–87. ISBN 9782707164995. OCLC 660132868. Archived from the original on May 27, 2018.
- Vermeren, Pierre (2016). Histoire du Maroc depuis l'indépendance (in French). La Découverte. ISBN 978-2-7071-9200-4. Archived from the original on January 14, 2023.
- Weexsteen, Raoul (1980). "La question du Sahara occidental 1978–1979". Annuaire de l'Afrique du Nord (in French). 1979. CNRS Éditions: 415–442. Archived from the original on May 27, 2018.
- Zunes, Stephen (2010). Western Sahara : War, Nationalism, and Conflict Irresolution. Syracuse University Press. ISBN 978-0-8156-5258-8. Archived from the original on July 26, 2021.
