= List of twin towns and sister cities in Spain =

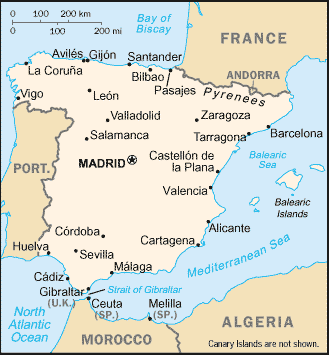
Map of Spain

This is a list of municipalities in Spain which have standing links to local communities in other countries known as "town twinning" (usually in Europe) or "sister cities" (usually in the rest of the world).

== A ==
Adeje

- Caracas, Venezuela
- Unterhaching, Germany

Albacete

- Bir Gandus, Western Sahara
- Houndé, Burkina Faso
- La Lisa (Havana), Cuba
- Nanchang, China
- San Carlos, Nicaragua
- Reconquista, Argentina
- Udine, Italy
- Velenje, Slovenia
- Vienne, France

Albuñol

- Asilah, Morocco
- Al Hoceima, Morocco
- Ifrane, Morocco

Alcalá de Guadaíra

- Durham, England, United Kingdom
- Questembert, France
- Stuhr, Germany

Alcalá de Henares

- Alba Iulia, Romania
- Azul, Argentina
- Fort Collins, United States
- Guanajuato, Mexico
- Lublin, Poland
- Montauban, France
- Peterborough, England, United Kingdom
- Plaza de la Revolución (Havana), Cuba
- San Diego, United States
- Talence, France

Alcalá del Río

- Artena, Italy

Alcobendas

- Épinay-sur-Seine, France

Algemesí

- Basnéré, Burkina Faso
- Chiari, Italy
- Gangneung, South Korea
- Riom, France

Alicante

- Alexandria, Egypt
- Brighton and Hove, England, United Kingdom
- Carloforte, Italy
- Herzliya, Israel
- León, Nicaragua
- Nice, France
- Oran, Algeria
- Wenzhou, China

Aller

- Gembloux, Belgium

Almansa

- Lymington, England, United Kingdom
- Saint-Médard-en-Jalles, France
- Scandiano, Italy
- Volvera, Italy

Almendralejo

- Ceprano, Italy
- A Rúa, Spain

Almuñécar

- Cerveteri, Italy
- Fürstenfeldbruck, Germany
- Hendersonville, United States
- Kelibia, Tunisia
- Livry-Gargan, France

Altea is a member of the Douzelage, a town twinning association of towns across the European Union. Asikkala also has one other twin town.

Douzelage

- Agros, Cyprus
- Asikkala, Finland
- Bad Kötzting, Germany
- Bellagio, Italy
- (Republic of Ireland) Bundoran, Ireland
- Chojna, Poland
- Granville, France
- Holstebro, Denmark
- Houffalize, Belgium
- Judenburg, Austria
- Kőszeg, Hungary
- Marsaskala, Malta
- Meerssen, Netherlands
- Niederanven, Luxembourg
- Oxelösund, Sweden
- Preveza, Greece
- Rokiškis, Lithuania
- Rovinj, Croatia
- Sesimbra, Portugal
- Sherborne, England, United Kingdom
- Sigulda, Latvia
- Siret, Romania
- Škofja Loka, Slovenia
- Sušice, Czech Republic
- Tryavna, Bulgaria
- Türi, Estonia
- Zvolen, Slovakia

Other

- Aurillac, France

L'Ametlla de Mar

- Patuca, Honduras
- Villeneuve-de-la-Raho, France

Antequera

- Agde, France
- Melilla, Spain
- Oaxaca de Juárez, Mexico

Aranda de Duero

- Langen, Germany
- Miranda do Douro, Portugal
- Romorantin-Lanthenay, France
- Roseburg, United States
- Salon-de-Provence, France
- Santa Cruz de Tenerife, Spain

Aranjuez

- Écija, Spain
- Le Pecq, France

Archena

- Chesham, England, United Kingdom

Ávila

- Guanajuato, Mexico
- Rhodes, Greece
- Teramo, Italy
- Villeneuve-sur-Lot, France

Avilés

- Saint-Nazaire, France
- St. Augustine, United States

== B ==
Badajoz

- Chipiona, Spain
- Elvas, Portugal
- Granada, Nicaragua
- Huánuco, Peru
- Nazaré, Portugal
- Punta Umbría, Spain
- San José de las Lajas, Cuba
- Santarém, Portugal

Baiona

- Palos de la Frontera, Spain
- Pornic, France
- Santa Fe, Spain
- Vila do Bispo, Portugal

Balmaseda

- Balmaceda (Coyhaique), Chile
- San Severino Marche, Italy
- Tifariti, Western Sahara

Barañain

- Caimito, Cuba
- Mława, Poland

Barcelona

- Antwerp, Belgium
- Athens, Greece
- Boston, United States
- Busan, South Korea
- Cologne, Germany
- (Republic of Ireland) Dublin, Ireland
- Gaza City, Palestine
- Havana, Cuba
- Istanbul, Turkey
- Kobe, Japan
- Monterrey, Mexico
- Montevideo, Uruguay
- Montpellier, France
- Rio de Janeiro, Brazil
- Saint Petersburg, Russia
- San Francisco, United States
- Santiago de Compostela, Spain
- Sarajevo, Bosnia and Herzegovina
- São Paulo, Brazil
- Shanghai, China
- Tel Aviv, Israel
- Tunis, Tunisia
- Valparaíso, Chile

Benalmádena

- Dongying, China
- Finale Ligure, Italy
- Nuevitas, Cuba
- Vagharshapat, Armenia

Berriozar

- Madruga, Cuba

Bilbao

- Bordeaux, France
- Buenos Aires, Argentina
- Medellín, Colombia
- Monterrey, Mexico
- Pittsburgh, United States
- Qingdao, China
- Rosario, Argentina
- Sant Adrià de Besòs, Spain
- (Georgia (country)) Tbilisi, Georgia

Boadilla del Monte

- Saint-Cloud, France

Boqueixón

- Hollókő, Hungary

Burgos

- Loudun, France
- Pessac, France

== C ==
Cabana de Bergantiños

- Treize-Septiers, France

Cáceres

- Blois, France
- Gaza City, Palestine
- Lumbini Sanskritik, Nepal
- Norma, Italy
- Piano di Sorrento, Italy
- Portalegre, Portugal
- Quillota, Chile
- La Roche-sur-Yon, France
- Santiago de Compostela, Spain
- Santo Domingo, Dominican Republic

Cádiz

- Ambalema, Colombia
- Bogotá, Colombia
- Brest, France
- Buenos Aires, Argentina
- Cartagena, Colombia
- Ceuta, Spain
- A Coruña, Spain
- Dakhla, Western Sahara
- Guaduas, Colombia
- Havana, Cuba
- Honda, Colombia
- Huelva, Spain
- Medway, England, United Kingdom
- Mexico City, Mexico
- Montevideo, Uruguay
- Móstoles, Spain
- Quito, Ecuador
- San Pedro Cholula, Mexico
- San Juan, Puerto Rico
- San Sebastián de Mariquita, Colombia
- Santa Cruz de Tenerife, Spain
- Santos, Brazil
- Tangier, Morocco
- Torrevieja, Spain
- Veracruz, Mexico

Calatayud

- Auch, France
- Dueville, Italy
- Gáldar, Spain
- Glen Ellyn, United States

Cambados

- Celorico de Basto, Portugal
- Le Vivier-sur-Mer, France

Canyelles

- Castelvecchio Subequo, Italy

Carballo

- L'Isle-Jourdain, France

Carcaixent

- Bagnols-sur-Cèze, France
- Braunfels, Germany
- Eeklo, Belgium
- Feltre, Italy
- Newbury, England, United Kingdom

Cartagena

- Terni, Italy

Cartaya

- Loulé, Portugal

Caspe

- Gaillac, France
- Santa Maria a Vico, Italy

Castellón de la Plana

- Châtellerault, France
- Lleida, Spain
- Târgoviște, Romania
- Ube, Japan

Catarroja

- Vara, Sweden

Cedeira

- Paimpont, France

Ceutí

- Saint-Berthevin, France

Chiclana de la Frontera

- El Astillero, Spain
- Béziers, France

Ciudad Real

- San Cristóbal de las Casas, Mexico

Collado Villalba

- Bègles, France

Coria del Río

- Sendai, Japan

Córdoba

- Bukhara, Uzbekistan
- Córdoba, Argentina
- Córdoba, Mexico
- Damascus, Syria
- Fez, Morocco
- Kairouan, Tunisia
- Lahore, Pakistan
- Nîmes, France
- Nuremberg, Germany
- Old Havana (Havana), Cuba
- Santiago de Compostela, Spain
- Smara, Western Sahara

Coristanco

- La Guyonnière, France

Cornellà de Llobregat

- Jinotega, Nicaragua
- Mariel, Cuba

Los Corrales de Buelna

- La Haie-Fouassière, France

A Coruña

- Cádiz, Spain
- Caracas, Venezuela
- (Republic of Ireland) Limerick, Ireland
- Mar del Plata, Argentina
- Mariglianella, Italy

Coslada

- Bouaké, Ivory Coast
- Jenin, Palestine
- Nejapa, El Salvador
- Oradea, Romania
- San José de las Lajas, Cuba

Covelo

- Geneston, France

Crevillent

- Fontenay-le-Comte, France

Cuenca

- L'Aquila, Italy
- Bollène, France
- Cerreto Sannita, Italy
- Cuenca, Ecuador
- Paju, South Korea
- Plasencia, Spain
- Ronda, Spain
- Taxco de Alarcón, Mexico
- Zacatecas, Mexico

Cuevas del Almanzora

- Saintes, France

== D ==
Dénia

- Cholet, France

Dos Hermanas

- Granada, Nicaragua
- Pinar del Río, Cuba

== E ==
Écija

- Aranjuez, Spain
- Les Pavillons-sous-Bois, France
- Smara, Western Sahara

Elche

- Toulouse, France

L'Eliana

- Mirande, France
- San Mauro Torinese, Italy

Espartinas

- Clackmannanshire, Scotland, United Kingdom
- Silves, Portugal
- Vendargues, France

Esplugues de Llobregat

- Ahrensburg, Germany

Estepa

- Badia Polesine, Italy

== F ==
Ferrol

- Águeda, Portugal
- Lugo, Spain
- Mondoñedo, Spain
- Vila do Conde, Portugal

Figueres

- Alcalá la Real, Spain
- Marignane, France
- St. Petersburg, United States

Fisterra

- Avellaneda, Argentina
- Cadaqués, Spain
- Sant Andreu (Barcelona), Spain

Foz

- Trégastel, France

== G ==
Gáldar

- Antigua Guatemala, Guatemala
- Calatayud, Spain
- Matera, Italy

Gandia

- Fano, Italy
- Laval, France
- Pleven, Bulgaria
- Reus, Spain

Gernika-Lumo

- Berga, Spain
- Boise, United States
- Halabja, Iraq
- Irpin, Ukraine
- Pforzheim, Germany

Gijón

- Havana, Cuba
- Niort, France
- Novorossiysk, Russia
- Puerto Vallarta, Mexico
- Smara, Western Sahara

Girona

- Albi, France
- Bluefields, Nicaragua
- Farsia, Western Sahara
- Reggio Emilia, Italy

Godella

- Bailly, France
- Lanuvio, Italy
- Noisy-le-Roi, France

Granada

- Aix-en-Provence, France
- Belo Horizonte, Brazil
- Freiburg im Breisgau, Germany
- Marrakesh, Morocco
- Sharjah, United Arab Emirates
- Tétouan, Morocco
- Tlemcen, Algeria

Guadalajara

- Buga, Colombia
- Guadalajara, Mexico
- Livorno, Italy
- Nuneaton and Bedworth, England, United Kingdom
- Roanne, France

== H ==
L'Hospitalet de Llobregat

- Centro Habana (Havana), Cuba
- Managua, Nicaragua
- Tuzla, Bosnia and Herzegovina

Huelva

- Borgomezzavalle, Italy
- Cádiz, Spain
- Faro, Portugal
- Houston, United States
- Salta, Argentina

Huesca

- Tarbes, France

Huéscar

- Kolding, Denmark

== I ==
Igualada

- Aksakovo, Bulgaria
- Guimarães, Portugal
- Montluçon, France
- Lecco, Italy

Inca

- Lompoc, United States
- Telpaneca, Nicaragua

== J ==
Jerez de la Frontera

- Arles, France
- Biarritz, France
- Ciudad Juárez, Mexico
- El Paso, United States
- Foz do Iguaçu, Brazil
- Kiyosu, Japan
- Moquegua, Peru
- Pisco, Peru
- Tequila, Mexico
- Zacatecas, Mexico

== L ==
Lalín

- Cabeceiras de Basto, Portugal
- Lalinde, France
- Linden, Germany
- Linden (Cuijk), Netherlands
- Lubbeek, Belgium
- Sankt Georgen am Walde, Austria

A Laracha

- Les Sables-d'Olonne, France

Laudio/Llodio

- Bou Craa, Western Sahara
- Somoto, Nicaragua

Leganés

- Aigaleo, Greece
- Arroyo Naranjo (Havana), Cuba
- Conchalí, Chile
- La Güera, Western Sahara
- Macará, Ecuador
- Papel Pampa, Bolivia
- Somoto, Nicaragua

León

- Baeza, Spain
- Bragança, Portugal
- Chartres, France
- León, Mexico
- Porto, Portugal
- Puebla, Mexico
- Viseu, Portugal
- Voronezh, Russia
- Xiangtan, China

Lleida

- Castellón de la Plana, Spain
- Ferrara, Italy
- Foix, France
- Lérida, Colombia
- Monterey, United States
- Perpignan, France

Logroño

- Brescia, Italy
- Darmstadt, Germany
- Dax, France
- Dunfermline, Scotland, United Kingdom
- El Hagounia, Western Sahara
- Libourne, France
- Rancagua, Chile
- La Rioja, Argentina

Lora del Río

- Zoersel, Belgium

Lugo

- Ferrol, Spain
- Qinhuangdao, China
- Viana do Castelo, Portugal

== M ==
Madrid

- Abu Dhabi, United Arab Emirates
- Asunción, Paraguay
- Bogotá, Colombia
- Bordeaux, France
- Buenos Aires, Argentina
- Caracas, Venezuela
- Guatemala City, Guatemala
- Havana, Cuba
- Lima, Peru
- Lisbon, Portugal
- Malabo, Equatorial Guinea
- Managua, Nicaragua
- Manila, Philippines
- Mexico City, Mexico
- Miami-Dade County, United States
- Montevideo, Uruguay
- New York City, United States
- Nouakchott, Mauritania
- Panama City, Panama
- La Paz, Bolivia
- Quito, Ecuador
- Rabat, Morocco
- Rio de Janeiro, Brazil
- San José, Costa Rica
- San Juan, Puerto Rico
- San Salvador, El Salvador
- Santiago, Chile
- Santo Domingo, Dominican Republic
- Sarajevo, Bosnia and Herzegovina
- Tegucigalpa, Honduras
- Tripoli, Libya

Madridejos

- Nérac, France

Mairena del Aljarafe

- Montignac, France
- Ticuantepe, Nicaragua

Majadahonda

- Clamart, France

Málaga

- Mobile, United States
- Passau, Germany
- Popayán, Colombia
- Zacatecas, Mexico

Malgrat de Mar

- Cárdenas, Nicaragua
- Figline e Incisa Valdarno, Italy
- Moguer, Spain
- Seynod (Annecy), France

Marbella

- Baler, Philippines
- (Georgia (country)) Batumi, Georgia
- Doha, Qatar
- Itanhaém, Brazil
- Jeddah, Saudi Arabia
- Kure, Japan
- Miami Beach, United States
- Nabeul, Tunisia
- Punta del Este, Uruguay
- Solidaridad, Mexico

Marchena

- Châteaudun, France

Mataró

- Cehegín, Spain
- Corsico, Italy
- Créteil, France
- Dürnau, Germany
- Fort Lauderdale, United States
- Gammelshausen, Germany

Medina del Campo

- Montmorillon, France
- Zug, Western Sahara

Mieres

- Amgala, Western Sahara
- Herstal, Belgium
- San Miguel del Padrón (Havana), Cuba

Mojácar

- Encamp, Andorra

Molins de Rei

- Chinandega, Nicaragua
- Lorca, Spain

Mollet del Vallès

- Montélimar, France
- Ravensburg, Germany
- Rivoli, Italy
- San Juan de Cinco Pinos, Nicaragua

Montcada i Reixac

- Águilas, Spain
- Nahulingo, El Salvador
- La Paz Centro, Nicaragua

Montornès del Vallès

- Amgala, Western Sahara
- Villanueva, Nicaragua

Murcia

- Genoa, Italy
- Grasse, France
- Irapuato, Mexico
- Lecce, Italy
- Łódź, Poland
- Miami, United States
- Murcia, Philippines

== N ==
Navalcarnero

- Segovia, Spain
- Vaux-le-Pénil, France

Noia

- Estarreja, Portugal
- Al Mahbes, Western Sahara

Novelda

- Bir Lehlou, Western Sahara
- Camagüey, Cuba

== O ==
Olesa de Montserrat

- Nonantola, Italy
- Weingarten, Germany

Oñati

- Châteaubernard, France
- Gleibat El Foula, Western Sahara
- Guadalajara, Mexico
- José C. Paz, Argentina
- Zacatecas, Mexico

Oviedo

- Bochum, Germany
- Buenos Aires, Argentina
- Clermont-Ferrand, France
- Hangzhou, China
- Jersey City, United States
- Maranello, Italy
- Móstoles, Spain
- Santa Clara, Cuba
- Santiago de Compostela, Spain
- Sintra, Portugal
- Tampa, United States
- Torrevieja, Spain
- Valencia de Don Juan, Spain
- Valparaíso, Chile
- Veracruz, Mexico
- Zamora, Spain

Ourense

- Plaza de la Revolución (Havana), Cuba
- Quimper, France
- Tlalnepantla de Baz, Mexico
- Vila Real, Portugal

== P ==
Los Palacios y Villafranca

- Los Palacios, Cuba
- Rivanazzano Terme, Italy
- Saint-Colomban, France
- Tifariti, Western Sahara

Palma de Mallorca

- Alghero, Italy
- Bari, Italy
- Naples, Italy
- Santa Cruz de Tenerife, Spain

Las Palmas de Gran Canaria

- Garachico, Spain
- Nouadhibou, Mauritania
- San Antonio, United States
- Vigo, Spain

Pamplona

- Bayonne, France
- Paderborn, Germany
- Pamplona, Colombia
- Yamaguchi, Japan

Peñarroya-Pueblonuevo

- Vilvoorde, Belgium

Plasencia

- Cuenca, Spain
- Piacenza, Italy

As Pontes de García Rodríguez

- Carmarthen, Wales, United Kingdom
- Lesneven, France

Pontevedra

- Barcelos, Portugal
- Nafpaktos, Greece
- Salvador, Brazil
- San José, Costa Rica
- Santo Domingo, Dominican Republic
- Vila Nova de Cerveira, Portugal

Pozuelo de Alarcón

- Bir Lehlou, Western Sahara
- Issy-les-Moulineaux, France
- Naucalpan de Juárez, Mexico
- Poznań, Poland
- Recanati, Italy
- Xicheng (Beijing), China

== R ==
Redondela

- Monção, Portugal
- Ponteareas, Spain

Reus

- Amgala, Western Sahara
- Astorga, Spain
- Bahía Blanca, Argentina
- Boyeros (Havana), Cuba
- Gandia, Spain
- Hadžići, Bosnia and Herzegovina

Ribadeo

- Loctudy, France

La Rinconada

- Ain Beida, Western Sahara
- Santiago de las Vegas (Havana), Cuba

Rubí

- Boyeros (Havana), Cuba
- La Calahorra, Spain
- Celanova, Spain
- Clichy, France
- Els Guiamets, Spain
- Guelta Zemmur, Western Sahara
- Ocotal, Nicaragua
- Pudahuel, Chile
- Villanueva de Córdoba, Spain

== S ==
Sabadell

- El Argoub, Western Sahara
- Lianyungang, China
- Matagalpa, Nicaragua

Sagunto

- Cecina, Italy
- Millau, France

Salamanca

- Coimbra, Portugal
- Würzburg, Germany

Salt

- Lingen, Germany
- Quilalí, Nicaragua

San Fernando

- Montigny-le-Bretonneux, France

San Lorenzo de El Escorial

- Saint-Quentin, France

San Mateo de Gállego

- Sinzing, Germany

San Sebastián

- Cape Bojador, Western Sahara
- Marugame, Japan
- Plymouth, England, United Kingdom
- Reno, United States
- Trento, Italy
- Wiesbaden, Germany

San Sebastián de los Reyes

- Baunatal, Germany

Sant Boi de Llobregat

- Azuaga, Spain
- Coín, Spain
- Marianao (Havana), Cuba
- Nizhny Novgorod, Russia
- Peraleda del Zaucejo, Spain
- San Miguelito, Nicaragua

Sant Cugat del Vallès

- Alba, Italy
- El Argoub, Western Sahara
- La Haba, Spain

Sant Feliu de Guíxols

- Bourg-de-Péage, France
- East Grinstead, England, United Kingdom
- Mindelheim, Germany
- Schwaz, Austria
- Verbania, Italy

Sant Pere de Ribes

- Puerto Cabezas, Nicaragua

Sant Sadurní d'Anoia

- Bastia Umbra, Italy
- Cañete la Real, Spain
- Zegama, Spain

Santa Comba

- Rio de Janeiro, Brazil

Santa Coloma de Gramenet

- Edchera, Western Sahara
- Habana del Este (Havana), Cuba
- Jalapa, Nicaragua
- Villa El Salvador, Peru

Santa Cruz de Bezana

- Martignas-sur-Jalle, France

Santa Cruz de Tenerife

- Aranda de Duero, Spain
- Cádiz, Spain
- Caracas, Venezuela
- Guatemala City, Guatemala
- Nice, France
- Palma de Mallorca, Spain
- Rio de Janeiro, Brazil
- San Antonio, United States
- Santa Cruz de la Sierra, Bolivia
- Santa Cruz del Norte, Cuba

Santa Fe

- Ambato, Ecuador
- Baiona, Spain
- Briviesca, Spain
- Bogotá, Colombia
- Caguas, Puerto Rico
- Guanajuato, Mexico
- Magdalena del Mar, Peru
- Ocotal, Nicaragua
- Palos de la Frontera, Spain
- Playa (Havana), Cuba
- Quetzaltenango, Guatemala
- San Miguel de Allende, Mexico
- Santa Cruz, Costa Rica
- Santa Fe, Argentina
- Santa Fe, United States
- Santa Fe de Sorte, Venezuela
- Valparaíso, Chile
- Vila do Bispo, Portugal
- Vire-Normandie, France

Santa Lucía de Tirajana

- Luleå, Sweden

Santa María de Cayón

- Gujan-Mestras, France

Santiago de Compostela

- Assisi, Italy
- Barcelona, Spain
- Cáceres, Spain
- Coimbra, Portugal
- Córdoba, Spain
- Mashhad, Iran
- Oviedo, Spain
- Pisa, Italy
- Qom, Iran
- Querétaro, Mexico
- Santiago do Cacém, Portugal
- São Paulo, Brazil

Santiponce

- Adamclisi, Romania

Santo Domingo de la Calzada

- Winnenden, Germany

Sarria

- El Escorial, Spain
- Guerlédan, France

Segovia

- Gangdong (Seoul), South Korea
- Navalcarnero, Spain
- San Bartolomé de Tirajana, Spain
- Tours, France

Sevilla la Nueva

- Saint-Ciers-sur-Gironde, France

Seville

- Antalya, Turkey
- Buenos Aires, Argentina
- Cartagena, Colombia
- Columbus, United States
- Coral Gables, United States
- Guadalajara, Mexico
- Havana, Cuba
- Kansas City, United States
- Laredo, Spain
- Marrakesh, Morocco
- Medina de Rioseco, Spain
- Rostov-on-Don, Russia
- San Salvador, El Salvador
- Tlalnepantla de Baz, Mexico
- Veracruz, Mexico

Soria

- Collioure, France

== T ==
Talavera de la Reina

- Bron, France
- Faenza, Italy
- Puebla, Mexico
- La Serena, Chile

Tarragona

- Alghero, Italy
- Avignon, France
- Klagenfurt, Austria
- Orléans, France
- Pompei, Italy
- Stafford, England, United Kingdom

Terrassa

- Granada, Nicaragua
- Pamiers, France
- Tecoluca, El Salvador
- Tétouan, Morocco

Tocina

- Żejtun, Malta

Toledo

- Aachen, Germany
- Agen, France
- Corpus Christi, United States
- Damascus, Syria
- Guanajuato, Mexico
- Heraklion, Greece
- Nara, Japan
- Old Havana (Havana), Cuba
- Safed, Israel
- Toledo, United States
- Veliko Tarnovo, Bulgaria

Tolosa

- Charleville-Mézières, France
- Zacatecas, Mexico

Tordesillas

- Setúbal, Portugal

Torrelavega

- Louga, Senegal
- Old Havana (Havana), Cuba
- Rochefort, France
- Zug, Western Sahara

Las Torres de Cotillas

- Arganil, Portugal

Torroella de Montgrí

- San Juan del Sur, Nicaragua
- Torreilles, France

Tortosa

- Alcañiz, Spain
- Avignon, France
- Le Puy-en-Velay, France
- Tartus, Syria
- Vercelli, Italy

Totana

- Kalocsa, Hungary
- Mérida, Spain
- Uchaud, France

Trujillo

- Almagro, Spain
- Batalha, Portugal
- Castegnato, Italy
- Piura, Peru
- Santa Fe de Antioquia, Colombia
- Trujillo, Honduras
- Trujillo, Peru

Tudela

- Le Mans, France
- Mauléon-Licharre, France
- Mont-de-Marsan, France

== U ==
Urretxu

- Schwarzenbruck, Germany

Utiel

- Pertuis, France

== V ==
Valdepeñas

- Cognac, France

Valencia

- Bologna, Italy
- Guangzhou, China
- Mainz, Germany
- Valencia, Venezuela
- Veracruz, Mexico
- Xi'an, China

Valencina de la Concepción

- Vauvert, France

Valladolid

- Florence, Italy
- Lecce, Italy
- Lille, France
- Morelia, Mexico
- Orlando, United States

Vigo

- Buenos Aires, Argentina
- Caracas, Venezuela
- Celaya, Mexico
- Lorient, France
- Nantes, France
- Narsaq, Greenland
- Las Palmas de Gran Canaria, Spain
- Porto, Portugal
- Qingdao, China
- Victoria de Durango, Mexico

Viladecans

- Saint-Herblain, France

Vilafranca del Penedès

- Bühl, Germany
- Melzo, Italy
- Novo Mesto, Slovenia
- Puerto Cabezas, Nicaragua

Vilagarcía de Arousa

- Matosinhos, Portugal

Vila-real

- Michalovce, Slovakia

Villanueva del Pardillo

- Chions, Italy
- Luisant, France

Vitoria-Gasteiz

- Anaheim, United States
- Angoulême, France
- Asunción, Paraguay
- Cogo, Equatorial Guinea
- La Güera, Western Sahara
- Ibagué, Colombia
- Victoria, United States

Viveiro

- Old Havana (Havana), Cuba

== X ==
Xeraco

- Bruguières, France

Xinzo de Limia

- Ponte de Lima, Portugal

== Y ==
Yepes

- Sainte-Eulalie, France

== Z ==
Zafra

- Rambouillet, France

Zaragoza

- Atizapán de Zaragoza, Mexico
- Bethlehem, Palestine
- Biarritz, France
- Campinas, Brazil
- Canfranc, Spain
- Coimbra, Portugal
- León, Nicaragua
- Mdina, Malta
- Móstoles, Spain
- Pau, France
- La Paz, Bolivia
- La Plata, Argentina
- Ponce, Puerto Rico
- San José de Cúcuta, Colombia
- Skopje, North Macedonia
- Taizhou, China
- Tijuana, Mexico
- Yoro, Honduras
- Zamboanga City, Philippines
- Zaragoza, El Salvador
- Zaragoza, Guatemala
