= Districts of Western Sahara =

The Districts of Western Sahara, known locally as Daïras (or Daerah), are a subdivision of a wilaya, the provinces within the Sahrawi Arab Democratic Republic's administrative system. Below is a list of all daïras:

- Wilaya of Aousserd: Agounit, Bir Gandus, La Güera, Mijek, Tichla, and Zug.
- Wilaya of Dakhla (Villa Cisneros): Ain Beida, Bir Anzarane, Bojador, El Argoub, Gleibat El Foula, Jraifia, and Oum Dreyga.
- Wilaya of El Aaiún: Bucraa, Daoura, Dcheira, Guelta Zemmur, and El Hagounia.
- Wilaya of Smara: Al Mahbes, Amgala, Bir Lehlou, Farsia, Haouza, Jdiriya, and Tifariti.

Only Agounit, Amgala, Bir Lehlou, Mijek, Tifariti, and Zug are the daïras under the control of the Sahrawi Republic; all others are under Moroccan occupation. La Güera, despite being on the Polisario-controlled side of the Moroccan Western Sahara Wall, is a ghost town and is de facto under Mauritanian custody.

== See also ==
- Subdivisions of the Sahrawi Arab Democratic Republic
