= Lahbib Ayoub =

Western Saharan militant (1951–2022)

- Born: Lahbib Sid Ahmed Aouba; 1951; Tifariti, Spanish Sahara
- Died: 1 November 2022 (aged 70–71); Rabat, Morocco
- Occupation: Militant

Lahbib Sid Ahmed Aouba, known as Lahbib Ayoub (1951 – 1 November 2022) was a Western Saharan militant and co-founder of the Polisario Front. He led many conflicts with the group before joining Morocco in 2002.

== Biography ==
Ayoub was born in Tifariti, Spanish Sahara in 1951 and served in the Spanish Army.

=== Polisario leader ===
In 1973, Ayoub became a founding member of the Polisario Front (PF), which aimed to free Western Sahara from Spanish and Moroccan rule. He was close with El-Ouali Mustapha Sayed, who would later become President of the Sahrawi Arab Democratic Republic, and sat on PF's executive committee from 1976 to 1989. He then became Minister of the Occupied Territories (territories in Western Sahara controlled by Morocco).

=== Achievements ===
During the Western Sahara War, Ayoub led many battles. On 30 September 1973, he led an attack on Spanish troops at a base near Amgala. In December 1975, he led a raid in Haouza against Moroccan troops. Following El-Ouali's death, he travelled to Nouadhibou on 6 June 1976 and attempted to assassinate President of Mauritania Moktar Ould Daddah. In May 1977, he led Polisarian forces in the Battle of Zouérat and attacked several hundred French aid workers and their families. In January 1979, he led troops in the Battle of Tan-Tan, a town located in Moroccan territory. The following month, he attacked garrisons in Jdiriya and Zag. That May, he led the Battle of Bir Anzarane and the Battle of Lebouirate. During Operation Iman and the Ras-el-Khanfra in 1980, he inflicted heavy losses on Moroccan troops. In October 1981, he commanded the Battle of Guelta Zemmur, where Polisarian anti-aircraft units shot down a C-130, a Mirage F1, a Northrop F-5, and a helicopter, all belonging to Morocco. He led attacks on the Moroccan Western Sahara Wall, such as the Battle of Lemseied in 1983 and the Battle of Guelta Zemmur in 1989.

=== Departure ===
In 2001, Ayoub's disagreements with Sahrawi President Mohamed Abdelaziz on relations with Algeria led him to depart from the PF. He subsequently left Western Sahara for Mali and joined Mokhtar Belmokhtar.

In October 2002, he moved to Morocco, where he joined forces with King Mohammed VI. He sought to bring back as many refugees as possible and told interviewers of the stranglehold that Algeria held over the PF.

Ayoub left behind his mother and three siblings at a camp in Aousserd, although his wife discreetly joined him in returning to Morocco before he announced his return.

=== Death ===
Lahbib Ayoub died on 1 November 2022.
