= Battle of Guelta Zemmur =

The battle of Guelta Zemmur (or Gueltat Zemmur or Guelta Zemmour) may refer to:

- Battle of Guelta Zemmur (1989)
- Battle of Guelta Zemmur (October 1981)
