= Battles of Farsia and Oum Dreyga =

- Part of the Western Sahara War
Date	18 November 1987
Location	Farsia and Oum Dreyga, Western Sahara

Belligerents
Morocco	Sahrawi Arab Democratic Republic; Polisario Front

Commanders and leaders
(Morocco) Unknown	(Sahrawi Arab Democratic Republic) Unknown

Strength
Unknown	Unknown

Casualties and losses
72 killed 76 wounded (Moroccan claim); 63 killed 91 wounded (POLISARIO claim)	245 killed (Moroccan claim)

The Battles of Farsia and Oum Dreyga occurred on 18 November 1987 in Farsia and Oum Dreyga, on the Moroccan side of the Moroccan Western Sahara Wall, when POLISARIO troops clashed with the Royal Moroccan Army. Over 300 combatants died as a result of the two battles. The clashes happened two days after the arrival of a United Nations technical mission whose goal was to evaluate the conditions for a self-determination referendum in Western Sahara.
