= Battle of Hausa =

Battle of Hausa (1989)
- Part of the Western Sahara War
Date	11 October 1989
Location	Haouza, Western Sahara
Result	Moroccan victory

Belligerents
Morocco	Sahrawi Arab Democratic Republic; Polisario Front

Casualties and losses
11 killed 10 wounded (Moroccan claim); 190 killed 31 captured (POLISARIO claim)	101 dead 2 armored vehicles 12 vehicles (Moroccan claim)

The 1989 Battle of Haouza was an armed confrontation in the Western Sahara War that took place on 11 October 1989, when Polisario Front troops attacked the Moroccan Wall in North Africa's Haouza region. The attack was seen as a POLISARIO response to the delay of the peace conversations with Morocco, and the declarations of Hassan II denying another encounter with Sahrawi representatives.

== The Battle ==
On 11 October 1989, the Polisario attacked the Moroccan wall in the Haouza region. The Polisario sent a mechanized battalion and a motorized battalion. According to the Polisario, they penetrated up to 20 kilometres (12 mi) into Moroccan territory beyond the wall before being pushed back or withdrawing towards the "Free Zone" east of the wall. Six Moroccan observation posts or bases were taken by the Polisario, the Moroccan soldiers were surprised, but the attack was finally repulsed and the Polisario suffered heavy losses because of the Moroccan air force. The Moroccan air force sent its Gazelle helicopters.

== Casualties ==
The Moroccan government announced that the Moroccan army has eliminated 101 Polisario fighters, and that 11 Moroccan soldiers were killed (including a lieutenant) and 10 wounded. The Polisario would also have lost 2 BMP-1, 12 jeeps and 6 artillery systems. The Polisario speaks of 190 dead, 150 wounded, and 36 prisoners among Moroccan soldiers.
