= Attack on Lebouirate =

- Part of Western Sahara War
Date	24 August 1979
Location	Lebouirate, Morocco
Result	Decisive Polisario Front victory

Belligerents
Sahrawi Arab Democratic Republic; Polisario Front	Morocco

Commanders and leaders
(Sahrawi Arab Democratic Republic) Lahbib Ayoub	(Morocco) Mohamed Azelmat (surrendered)

Strength
(Sahrawi Arab Democratic Republic) 150	(Morocco) 600–780

Casualties and losses
Unknown	(Morocco) 230-562 killed: 12 servicemen captured.; a hundred armored vehicles, fifty-seven military vehicles and numerous guns were seized.

The Attack on Lebouirate was a significant military engagement that took place during the ongoing Western Sahara conflict between the Moroccan government and the Polisario Front.

== Attack ==
The Moroccan communiqué reported that the attack on Lebouirate was executed by Polisario guerrilla forces, who caught the garrison commander off guard. The commander abandoned his position, allowing the enemy to seize control of the attacked locality, which they held throughout August 24. The Moroccan troops suffered a serious defeat as a large number of defenders at the base were massacred during the attack.

Two days after the incident, the Moroccan ministry of information officially admitted the fall of the Lebouirate base. Squadron Leader Azelmat, who commanded the garrison, was criticized for failing to offer adequate resistance to the attacking Polisario forces. The lack of opposition resulted in the abandonment of defensive positions and the loss of a significant amount of military equipment.

== Books ==
- Affairs, United States Congress House Committee on Foreign Affairs Subcommittee on International Security and Scientific (1980). Proposed Arms Sale to Morocco: Hearings Before the Subcommittees on International Security and Scientific Affairs and on Africa of the Committee on Foreign Affairs, House of Representatives, Ninety-sixth Congress, Second Session, January 24 and 29, 1980. U.S. Government Printing Office.
