= Assa-Zag Province =

Province in Guelmim-Oued Noun, Morocco

Coordinates: 28.610596°N 9.429874°W

Assa-Zag Province إقليم آسا الزاك ⵜⴰⵙⴳⴰ ⵏ ⵓⵙⴰ ⵥⵥⴰⴳ
- Province
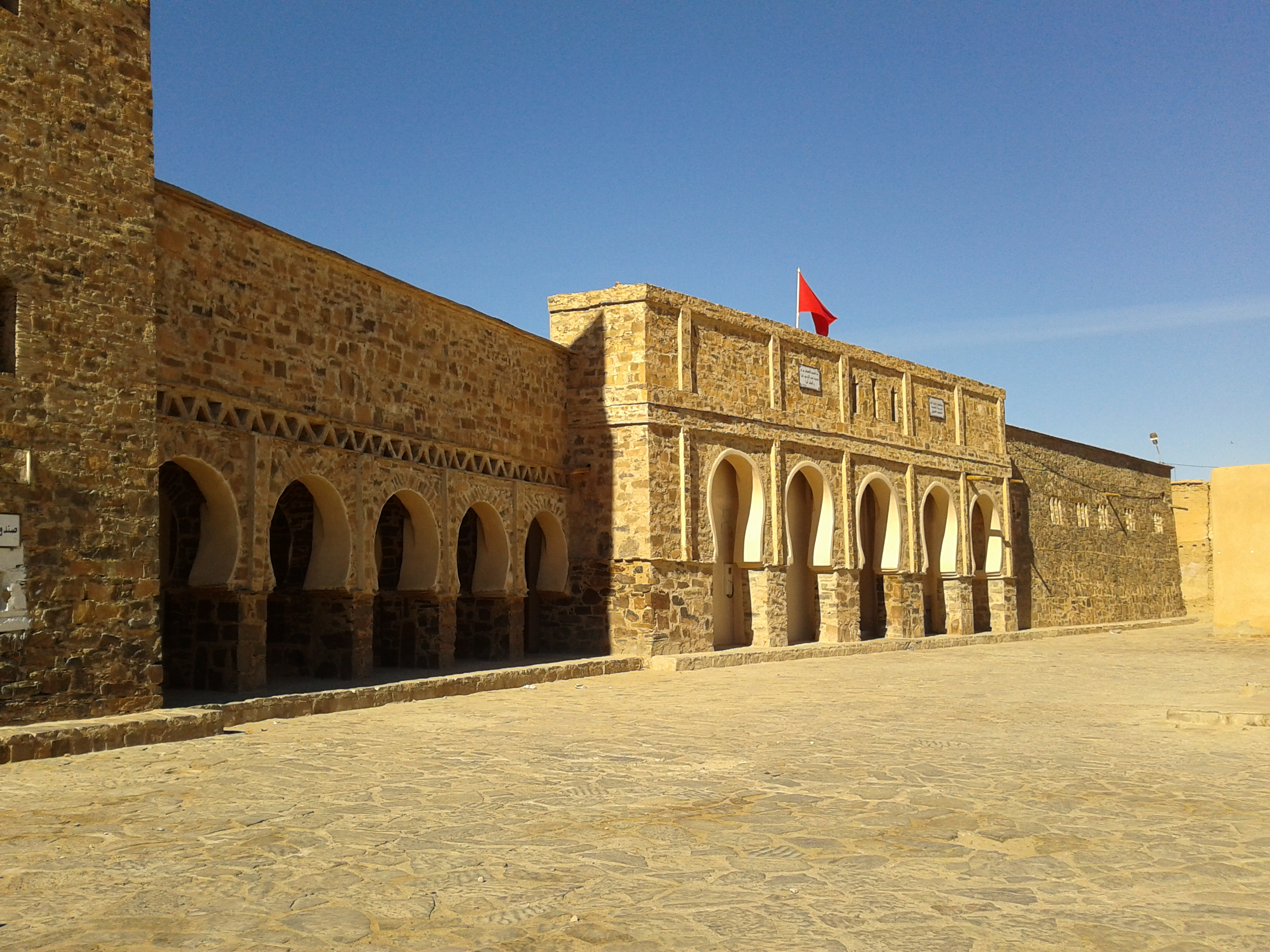
- View of Zaouiat Assa in Assa-Zag Province
- Interactive map of Assa-Zag Province
- Country: Morocco
- Region: Guelmim-Oued Noun
- Seat: Assa

Population (2024)
  - Total: 53,298

Assa-Zag (Arabic: آسا الزاك, Standard Moroccan Tamazight: ⴰⵙⵙⴰ ⵥⵥⴰⴳ) is a province in the Moroccan region of Guelmim-Oued Noun. Its population in 2004 was 43,535.

The major cities and towns are:

- Assa
- Zag

== Subdivisions ==
The province is divided administratively into the following:

Name	Geographic code	Type	Households	Population (2004)	Foreign population	Moroccan population	Notes
Assa	071.01.01.	Municipality	2,420	12,905	3	12,902	
Zag	071.01.03.	Municipality	1,335	12,653	21	12,632	
Aouint Lahna	071.03.01.	Rural commune	326	2,234	0	2,234	
Aouint Yghomane	071.03.03.	Rural commune	331	2,004	0	2,004	
Touizgui	071.03.05.	Rural commune	170	4,177	1	4,176	
Al Mahbass	071.05.01.	Rural commune	48	7,331	9	7,322	
Labouirat	071.05.03.	Rural commune	206	2,231	3	2,228	
