= Imlili =

- Rural commune and town
- Location within Western Sahara
- Coordinates: 23.2349°N 16.0792°W
- Territory: Western Sahara
- Region: Dakhla-Oued Ed-Dahab
- Province: Oued Ed-Dahab

Area
  - Total: 194.91 km^{2} (75.26 sq mi)

Population (2004)
  - Total: 2,311
  - Density: 11.86/km^{2} (30.71/sq mi)
- Time zone: UTC+0 (GMT)

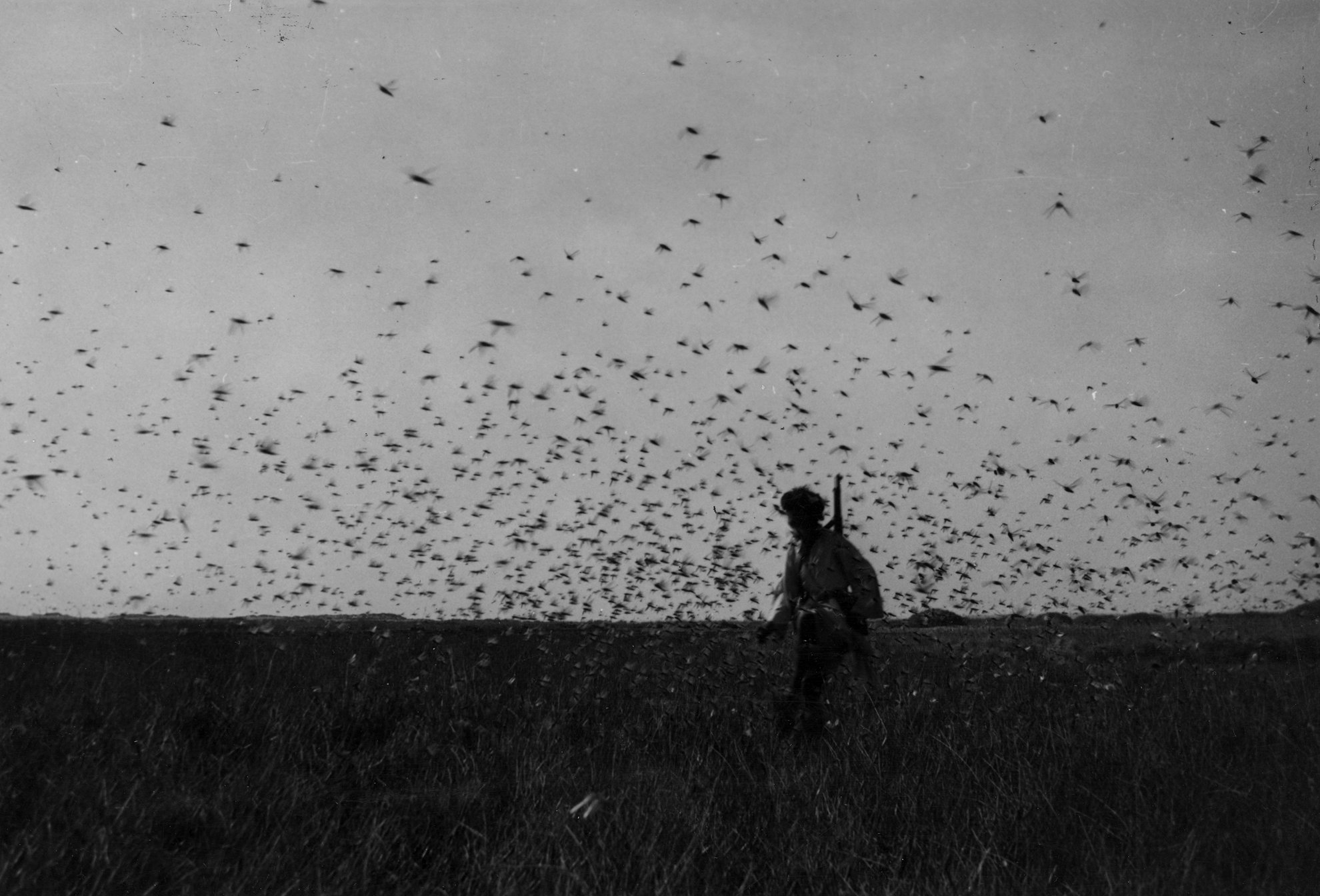
A desert locust cloud over Juncus maritimus at Imililik, Spanish Sahara (April 1944).

Imlili (also transliterated "Imlilik") is a town in the disputed territory of Western Sahara. It is occupied by Morocco as a rural commune in Oued Ed-Dahab Province in the region of Dakhla-Oued Ed-Dahab.

In the maps of the early years of the 20th century, it was known as El-Fadj or El-Fuj.

At the time of the 2004 census, the commune had a total population of 2311 people living in 474 households.
