= Touizgui =

- Location in Morocco
- Country: Morocco
- Region: Guelmim-Oued Noun
- Province: Assa-Zag Province

Population (2014)
  - Total: 5,022
- Time zone: UTC+0 (GMT)

Touizgui is a small town and rural commune in the Assa-Zag Province of the Guelmim-Oued Noun region of Morocco. At the time of the 2024 census, the commune had a total population of 6,786 people.
