= Aouint Yghomane =

Aouint Yghomane عوينة يغمان
- Rural Commune
- Location within Morocco
- Coordinates: 28.5000°N 10.5279°W
- Country: Morocco
- Region: Guelmim-Oued Noun
- Province: Assa-Zag Province

Population (2004)
  - Total: 2,004
- Time zone: UTC+0 (GMT)
- Geographic code: 071.03.01

Aouint Yghomane (also spelled Aouint Ighoumane, Arabic: عوينة يغمان) is a rural commune in the Assa-Zag Province, Guelimim-Oued Noun Region, Morocco. The municipality has a population of 3,042 with 470 households as of 2014.
