= Aouint Lahna =

Aouint Lahna عوينة لهنا
- Rural Commune
- Location within Morocco
- Coordinates: 28.4862°N 9.8484°W
- Country: Morocco
- Region: Guelmim-Oued Noun
- Province: Assa-Zag Province

Population (2014)
  - Total: 2,391
- Time zone: UTC+0 (GMT)
- Geographic code: 071.03.01.

Aouint Lahna (also known as Aouinet Torkoz, Arabic: عوينة لهنا) is a rural commune (French: commune rurale) in Assa-Zag Province, Morocco. As of 2014, the commune had 470 households and a total population of 2,391 people.
