= Battle of Bir Anzarane (1979) =

Military confrontation in Western Sahara

Date	August 11, 1979
Location	Bir Anzarane, Western Sahara 23°53′36″N 14°33′10″W

Belligerents
Sahrawi Arab Democratic Republic; Polisario Front	Morocco

Commanders and leaders
(Sahrawi Arab Democratic Republic) Lahbib Ayoub (Sahrawi Arab Democratic Republic) Banna Ould Baha (WIA)	(Morocco) Ali Mzerd Ouzine

Units involved
1,500 to 3,000 individuals 500 vehicles	800 to 950 individuals 3 F-5A fighters

Casualties and losses
50 dead 500 dead (Moroccan claim); 4 to 117 vehicles destroyed	100 dead 200 dead (Polisario claim); 40 to 250 wounded 100 to 175 prisoners
- Location within Western Sahara

The Battle of Bir Anzarane was a significant military confrontation between the armed forces of the Sahrawi Arab Democratic Republic, represented by the Polisario Front, and the Moroccan Armed Forces. The confrontation took place in the oasis of Bir Anzarane, situated in Western Sahara, a territory that is the subject of a claim by both parties.

== Context ==
The conflict occurred during a pivotal period of transition. On August 5, 1979, Mauritania withdrew from the Río de Oro province, relinquishing its claims to the territory. Morocco promptly proceeded to invade the region, prompting the Polisario Front to launch an offensive to secure access to the province, particularly the strategic city of Dakhla.

== Battle overview ==
The Polisario column comprised 2,500 to 3,000 combatants and 500 vehicles, including BRDM-2 light armored vehicles, BM-13 multiple rocket launchers, and all-terrain vehicles equipped with 106 mm recoilless rifles, 14.5 mm heavy machine guns, or 20 mm cannons. The Bir Anzarane garrison under the command of Battalion Commander Ali Mzerd Ouzine consisted of 800 personnel from the 3rd Motorized Infantry Regiment, organized into two battalions.

The engagement between the opposing forces lasted from 6:30 a.m. to 4:00 p.m. The Moroccan Air Force, with three F-5A fighter jets, reportedly provided support starting at 8:30 a.m. In certain positions, close combat occurred. At approximately noon, a counterattack spearheaded by Moroccan AML-90 armored vehicles thwarted a pincer movement initiated by the Polisario's mobile forces. Thereafter, the intensity of the Polisario attacks waned and ultimately ceased. Banna Ould Baha, the commander of the Polisario's 4th military region, sustained injuries during the battle.

The Moroccan Army's 6th Motorized Infantry Regiment, under the command of Lieutenant Colonel Mohamed Ghoujdami, was called in as reinforcements but did not arrive until after the cessation of hostilities.

== Casualties and aftermath ==
Morocco reported 125 casualties while claiming that Polisario's losses were significantly greater, with over 500 killed and 60 vehicles destroyed, according to statements by King Hassan II. A journalist on the scene observed 100 fatalities on the Moroccan side and 50 fatalities and four destroyed vehicles on the Polisario side. The Polisario claimed that more than two hundred Moroccan combatants had been killed and that 175 prisoners had been taken. U.S. Congressman Stephen Solarz met with approximately one hundred Moroccan prisoners captured during the battle. The Polisario also seized military equipment. Only thirteen bodies of Polisario fighters remained on the battlefield.

After the battle, Ali Mzerd Ouzine, the garrison commander, was promoted to lieutenant colonel.

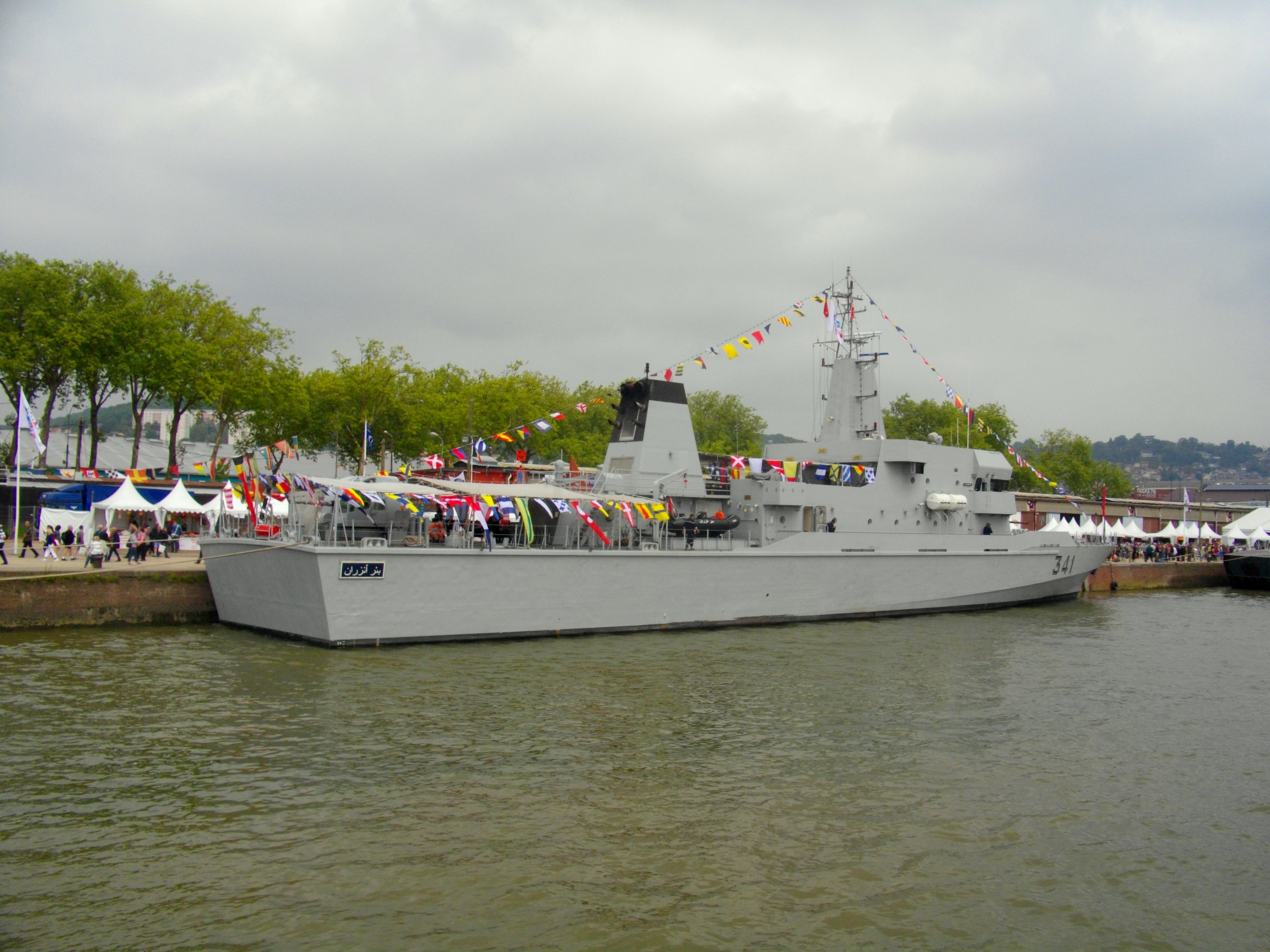
The Moroccan patrol vessel Bir Anzarane in Rouen in 2013.

Subsequently, the Royal Moroccan Navy designated the patrol vessel Bir Anzarane (OVP70), which commenced operational service in 2011, commemorating this engagement.

== Bibliography ==
- Merini, Abdelhak El (2000). الجيش المغربي عبر التاريخ [The Moroccan Army through history] (in Arabic). Rabat: Dar Nachr Al Maârifa. ISBN 9981-808-42-3.
- Tobji, Mahjoub (2006). Les officiers de Sa Majesté : Les dérives des généraux marocains 1956-2006. Paris: Fayard. ISBN 978-2-213-63015-1. Archived from the original on April 14, 2018.
- Clodfelter, Micheal (2017). Warfare and Armed Conflicts: A Statistical Encyclopedia of Casualty and Other Figures, 1492–2015 (4th ed.). McFarland. pp. 555–556. ISBN 978-0-7864-7470-7. Archived from the original on December 11, 2023.
