= Battle of Tan-Tan =

1979 conflict in Morocco

Date	January 28-31, 1979
Location	Tan-Tan, Morocco 28°25′46″N 11°05′53″W

Belligerents
SADR	Morocco

Commanders and leaders
(Sahrawi Arab Democratic Republic) Lahbib Ayoub (Sahrawi Arab Democratic Republic) Sidi Ahmed El Batal	(Morocco) Abdelaziz Bennani (Note: Commander of the southern zone.) (Morocco) Colonel Lahlou

Units involved
3,700 people 200 vehicles	150 people

Casualties and losses
At least 20 dead	At least 17 dead At least 14 injured 1-18 prisoners
- 8 civilians killed and 9 wounded. 10 women abducted.

The Battle of Tan-Tan took place between 28 and 31 January 1979, pitting the troops of the Polisario Front against the Moroccan army in Tan-Tan and its surrounding areas in Morocco.

== Forces involved ==
The Polisario Front deployed approximately 1,700 fighters and 200 vehicles. Its forces were equipped with 107 mm B-11 recoilless rifles, 106 mm recoilless rifles, 75 mm B-10 recoilless rifles, twin-barreled 23 mm guns, 120 mm and 82 mm mortars, heavy machine guns of 14.5 mm and 12.7 mm caliber, as well as Kalashnikov rifles. Sources differ regarding the identity of the leader of the raid, naming either Lahbib Ayoub or Sidi Ahmed El Batal.

Moroccan forces, anticipating an attack on Lemsied, had redeployed units to that area. At the time of the assault, the town was reportedly defended by a limited garrison of around thirty soldiers, excluding moghaznis under the authority of the Ministry of the Interior. Moroccan troop strength in the sector at the outset of the attack is estimated at several hundred soldiers, under the command of Colonel Lahlou.

== Course of events ==
=== Attack on the city (28 January) ===
The attack began around 1:30 p.m. on 28 January 1979, when Sahrawi forces advanced from the south and rapidly encircled the city. Fire bases were established approximately 6 to 7 kilometers from Tan-Tan, from which the city was shelled. The principal targets included the sector commander’s headquarters, military barracks, and defensive positions.

The Polisario did not commit all of its forces at Tan-Tan. In order to hinder the arrival of reinforcements, its fighters established a roadblock on the Tan-Tan–Guelmim road and engaged Moroccan units moving toward the city. Covered from the rear, several small groups infiltrated two peripheral neighborhoods, where they carried out attacks affecting both civilians and military personnel, and engaged in looting of commercial premises. Moroccan tanks stationed in the city responded while awaiting reinforcements. The Polisario bombardment had limited effect on its intended targets. At this stage, casualties were reported as approximately 20 attackers and 5 civilians killed, while Moroccan military losses were not specified. Around 3:00 p.m., units arriving from Zag and Tarfaya entered the city, leading to a general withdrawal of Polisario forces about thirty minutes later. Moroccan artillery fire subsequently brought the Sahrawi bombardment to an end.

=== Fighting at Khaloua, Lemsied, and Oudel Zita (29–31 January) ===
On 29 January, during the withdrawal of the independence fighters, part of their forces was intercepted at Khaloua by a Moroccan unit, leading to renewed fighting in which air support was employed. The engagement continued until nightfall.

The following day, Moroccan reinforcements from Lemsied intercepted independence fighters southwest of Tan-Tan, resulting in further clashes. On 30 January, at Oudel Zita, approximately 60 kilometers southeast of Tan-Tan, intense fighting between Moroccan forces and Polisario guerrillas lasted until nightfall, with Moroccan aircraft again intervening. According to Polisario sources, additional fighting occurred at Lemsied on 31 January.

== Outcome and consequences ==
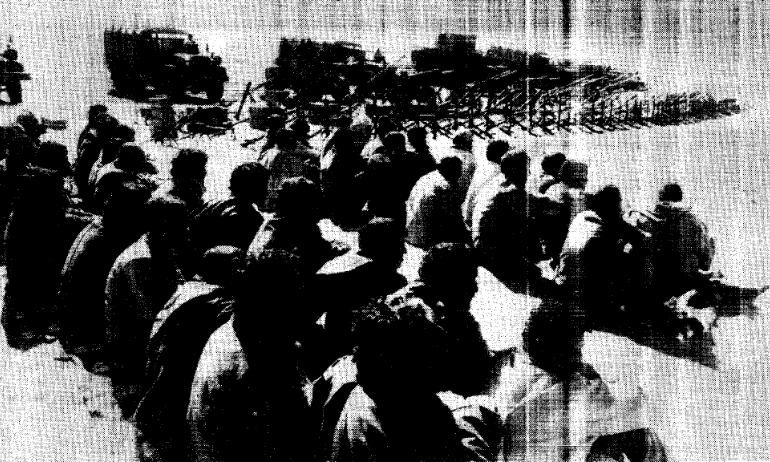
Moroccan prisoners and captured equipment, presented by the SADR after the raid.

Moroccan authorities reported that, during the fighting in Tan-Tan, 4 soldiers were killed and 14 wounded, along with 13 moghaznis killed, and that a police officer was captured. They also stated that 8 civilians were killed and 9 wounded, and that 13 women were abducted by Polisario fighters, three of whom later escaped.

According to Polisario statements, Moroccan forces suffered 314 killed, 300 wounded, and 18 captured, and 118 Sahrawi prisoners were released. A journalist from Le Monde, Louis Gravier, who visited the site, noted that these claims appeared exaggerated, particularly regarding the extent of the city’s destruction, and that the captured police officer was described as a “provincial police commissioner.” The Polisario also reported 48 killed and 30 wounded on its side, as well as the downing of an F-5 Freedom Fighter aircraft during fighting at Lemsied.

According to Moroccan estimates, around 200 Polisario fighters were killed during the fighting and approximately 100 vehicles were destroyed, with a quantity of military equipment reportedly abandoned.

The attack, carried out on territory regarded by Morocco as undisputed, prompted calls for national unity from political parties, including Istiqlal and the USFP. Colonel Abdelaziz Bennani, who commanded operations, was subsequently relieved of his duties. The events also led to public debate and political scrutiny in Morocco regarding the capabilities and strategy of the Royal Armed Forces.

== See also ==
- Tan-Tan
- Polisario Front
- Royal Moroccan Army
