= Oued Ed-Dahab Province =

Province of Morocco

Coordinates: 23.7167°N 15.9500°W

Oued Ed-Dahab (Arabic: إقليم وادي الذهب;Spanish: ex-Río de Oro) is a province in the region of Dakhla-Oued Ed-Dahab, in the Moroccan-occupied territory of Western Sahara. Its population at the 2004 Census was 65,378. Its major town is Dakhla.

== Subdivisions ==
The province is divided administratively into the following:

Name	Geographic code	Type	Households	Population (2004)	Foreign population	Moroccan settlers	Notes
Dakhla	391.01.01.	Municipality	13715	58104	107	57997	
Bir Anzarane	391.05.01.	Rural commune	262	6597	18	6579	
Gleibat El Foula	391.05.03.	Rural commune	42	2973	1	2972	
Mijik	391.05.05.	Rural commune	92	519	5	514	
Oum Dreyga	391.05.07.	Rural commune	78	3005	1	3004	
El Argoub	391.09.01.	Rural commune	1012	5345	6	5339	
Imlili	391.09.03.	Rural commune	474	2311	0	2311	
