= Dcheira =

Dcheira الدشيرة (Arabic) Edchera (Spanish)
- Rural commune
- Interactive map of Dcheira
- Non-self-governing territory: Western Sahara
- Administering power: Spain (de jure) (Note: In 1976, Spain withdrew from Western Sahara and informed the Secretary-General of the United Nations that it no longer considers itself responsible for the territory. Nonetheless, the criminal division of the Audiencia Nacional ruled in 2014 that Spain remains as Western Sahara's de jure administering power. This position is shared by the United Nations, the African Union, and several jurists. Additionally, Spain continues to manage Western Saharan airspace.)
- Claimed by: Morocco; Sahrawi Republic
- Controlled by: Morocco
- Region: Laâyoune-Sakia El Hamra
- Province: Laâyoune

Population (2024)
  - Total: 895
- Time zone: UTC+0 (GMT)

Dcheira (Arabic: الدشيرة; Spanish: Edchera) is a small town in Western Sahara. It is occupied by Morocco as a rural commune, part of the Laâyoune Province, in the Laâyoune-Sakia El Hamra region. Under the Sahrawi Arab Democratic Republic administrative system is a daïra (district) within the wilaya (province) of El Aaiún.

In 1958, when it was part of the Spanish Sahara, the Battle of Dcheira took place.
