= Basnéré, Yaba =

Basnéré
- Country: Burkina Faso
- Region: Boucle du Mouhoun Region
- Province: Nayala
- Department: Yaba Department

Population (2005)
  - Total: 182

Basnéré is a village in the Yaba Department of Nayala Province in north-western Burkina Faso. The village has a population of 182.
