= San Mateo de Gállego =

Coordinates: 41°50′N 0°46′W

San Mateo de Gállego, Spain
- Flag Coat of arms
- Interactive map of San Mateo de Gállego, Spain
- Country: Spain
- Autonomous community: Aragon
- Province: Zaragoza
- Municipality: San Mateo de Gállego

Area
  - Total: 72 km^{2} (28 sq mi)

Population (2025-01-01)
  - Total: 3,489
  - Density: 48/km^{2} (130/sq mi)
- Time zone: UTC+1 (CET)
  - Summer (DST): UTC+2 (CEST)

San Mateo de Gállego (Aragonese: Sant Mateu de Galligo) is a municipality located in the province of Zaragoza, Aragon, Spain. According to the 2004 census (INE), the municipality has a population of 3100 inhabitants.

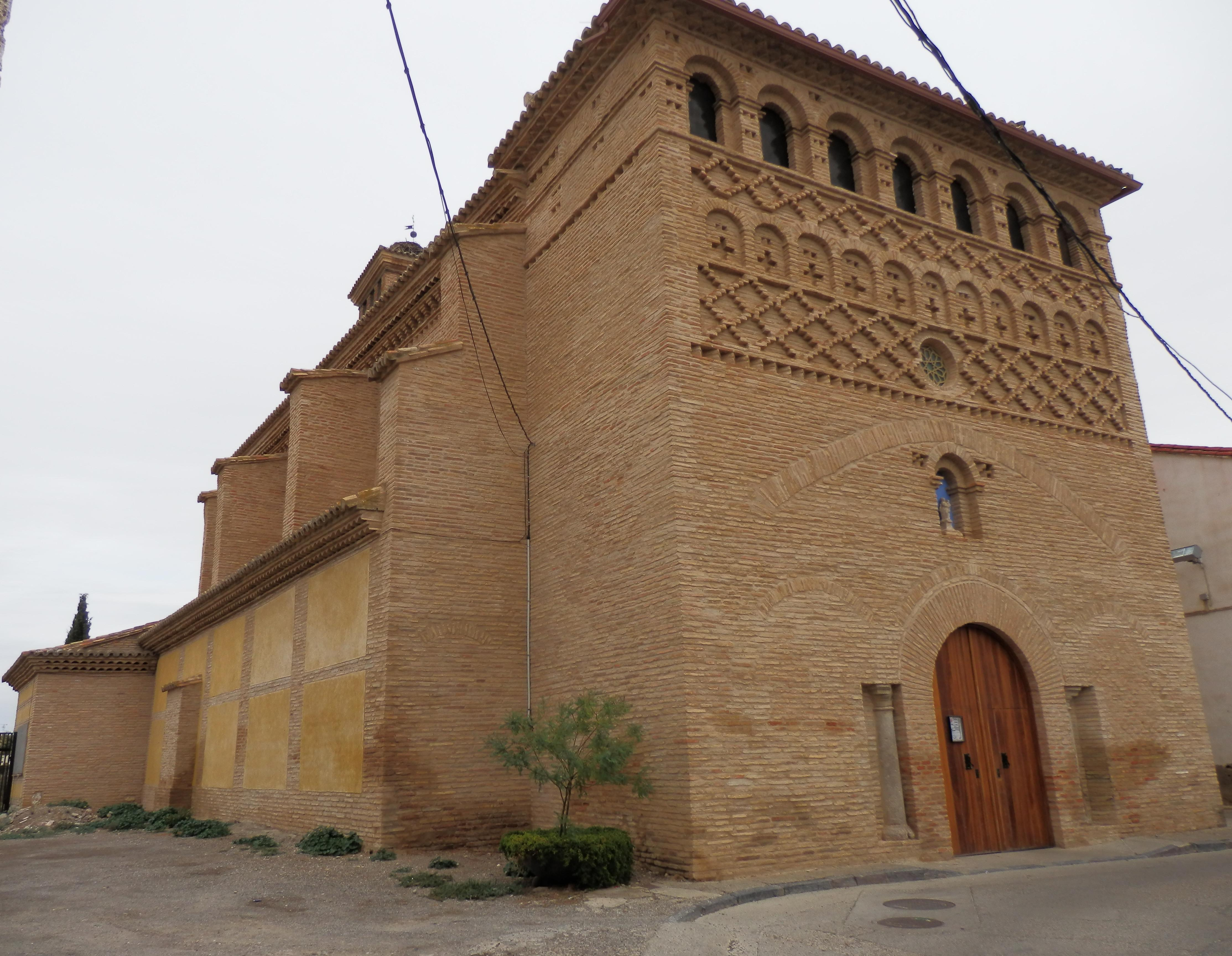
Church of San Mateo de Gállego, Zaragoza, Spain

== See also ==
- List of municipalities in Zaragoza
