= Battle of Guelta Zemmur (1989) =

Battle

Battle of Guelta Zemmour
- Part of the Western Sahara War
Date	7 October 1989
Location	Guelta Zemmur, Western Sahara
Result	Morocco victory

Belligerents
Morocco	Sahrawi Arab Democratic Republic; Polisario Front

Commanders and leaders
(Morocco) unknown	Lahbib Ayoub

Casualties and losses
14 killed 31 wounded (Moroccan claim)	80 killed or wounded (Moroccan claim)

The Battle of Guelta Zemmur occurred on 7 October 1989, when POLISARIO guerrillas commanded by Lahbib Ayub attacked the village of Guelta Zemmur on the Moroccan side of the Moroccan Western Sahara Wall. The attack was the first major military engagement in the war since 1988, as the Polisario Front had ended negotiations with Morocco in that year. The King of Morocco, Hassan II, responded to the offensive by rejecting a second meeting with POLISARIO leaders. According to the Spanish newspaper El País, at least a hundred soldiers from both sides were killed in the clashes.

== Background ==
Western Sahara was a Spanish colony until 1975, prior to 1884 the Sahara was under the sovereignty of the Sultan of Morocco. A war erupted between Morocco and the Sahrawi Polisario Front, which proclaimed the Sahrawi Arab Democratic Republic (SADR) with a government-in-exile in Tindouf, Algeria. Mauritania withdrew in 1979, and Morocco eventually secured control of most of the territory, including all the major cities and natural resources. Armed conflict continued between Polisario and Morocco over prominence in the region, with Algerian, Cuban, Egyptian, Vietnamese, and Russian support for Polisario and French support for Morocco. The U.N. peace mission that aimed for a ceasefire and a referendum was accepted in various degrees by both combatants. The war was fought at a moment when Polisario felt that the second peace talks were deliberately delayed by King Hassan of Morocco. As a result, the peace talks were never held.

== Battle ==
After Morocco built fortified sand walls in the northwestern border towards Western Sahara, the Polisario Front responded by attacking the Moroccan base at Guelta Zemmour. Morocco overpowered Polisario inflicting defeat of the Polisario. Morocco maintained the wall, Polisario left 18 tanks and other armored vehicles destroyed by Gazelle helicopters on the field.
