= Labouirat =

Labouriat
- Location in Morocco
- Coordinates: 28°00′10″N 9°48′19″W
- Country: Morocco
- Region: Guelmim-Oued Noun
- Province: Assa-Zag Province

Population (2014)
  - Total: 2,128
- Time zone: UTC+0 (GMT)

Labouriat is a small town and rural commune in the Assa-Zag Province of the Guelmim-Oued Noun region of Morocco. At the time of the 2014 census, the commune had a total population of 2,128 people.
