= Bir Gandus =

Bir Gandus بئر كندوز Bir Ganduz
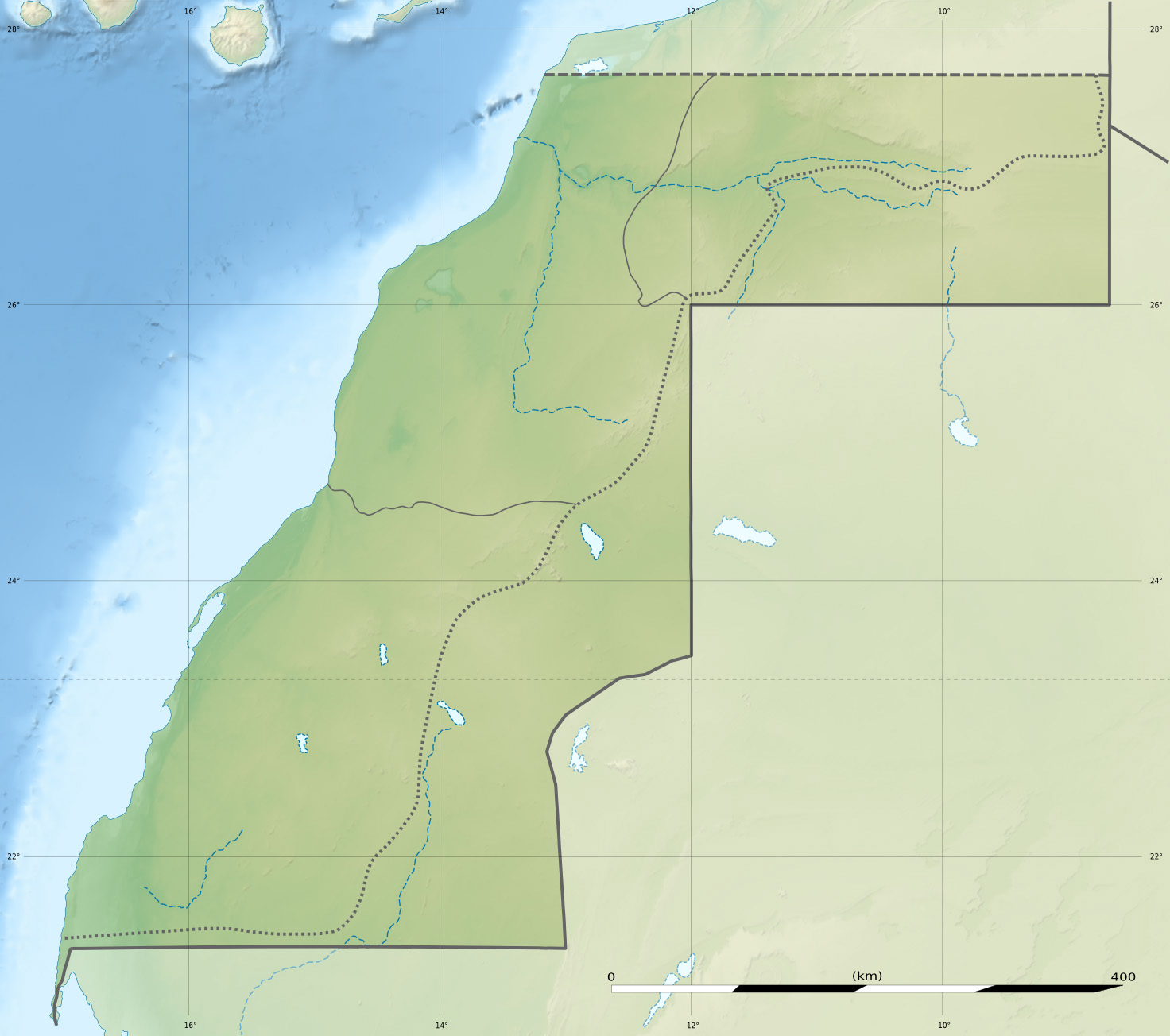
- Location in Western Sahara Bir Gandus (Africa)
- Coordinates: 21°37′N 16°28′W
- Territory: Moroccan Sahara
- Claimed by: Morocco; Sahrawi Republic
- Controlled and occupied by: Morocco

Area
  - Total: 2,186.44 km^{2} (844.19 sq mi)

Population (2014)
  - Total: 4,625
  - Density: 2.115/km^{2} (5.479/sq mi)
- Time zone: UTC+0 (GMT)

Bir Gandus or Bir Gandouz (Arabic: بئر كندوز, romanized: Biʾr Kandūz) is a village in Western Sahara, currently controlled by Morocco. As a claimed rural commune of Morocco it serves as the headquarters of Morocco's Aousserd Province and recorded a population of 4625 in the 2014 Moroccan census. It holds a Moroccan military post. Although sometimes called so, it is not a border post. The border post to Mauritania is to the west on the RN1 at Guerguerat although the stamp given there bore the name of Bir Gandus.

In February 2023, the Royal Moroccan Football Federation announced the construction of two football fields in Bir Gandouz and Guerguerat.
