= El Argoub =

Coordinates: 29°29′N 9°42′W

- Rural commune and town
- Interactive map of El Argoub
- Territory: Western Sahara
- Claimed by: Kingdom of Morocco; Sahrawi Arab Democratic Republic
- Controlled by: Kingdom of Morocco
- Region: Dakhla-Oued Ed-Dahab
- Province: Oued Ed-Dahab

Area
  - Total: 130.87 km^{2} (50.53 sq mi)

Population (2004)
  - Total: 5,345
  - Density: 40.84/km^{2} (105.8/sq mi)
- Time zone: UTC+0 (GMT)
- Website: www.dakhla.net

El Argoub or El Aargub (Arabic: العركوب) is a town in the disputed territory of Western Sahara. It is occupied by Morocco as a rural commune in Oued Ed-Dahab Province of the region of Dakhla-Oued Ed-Dahab.

At the time of the 2004 census, the commune had a total population of 5345 people living in 1012 households.
