= Gleibat El Foula =

- Rural commune and town
- Location within Western Sahara
- Coordinates: 23.5163°N 14.2056°W
- Territory: Western Sahara
- Claimed by: SADR; Morocco
- Region: Dakhla-Oued Ed-Dahab
- Province: Oued Ed-Dahab

Area
  - Total: 162.13 km^{2} (62.60 sq mi)

Population (2004)
  - Total: 2,973
  - Density: 18.34/km^{2} (47.49/sq mi)
- Time zone: UTC+0 (GMT)

Gleibat El Foula is a town in the disputed territory of Western Sahara. It is occupied by Morocco as a rural commune in Oued Ed-Dahab Province in the region of Dakhla-Oued Ed-Dahab. At the time of the 2004 census, the commune had a total population of 2973 people living in 42 households.
