= Oum Dreyga =

Oum Dreyga أم دريقة Um Dreiga (Spanish)
- Rural commune and town
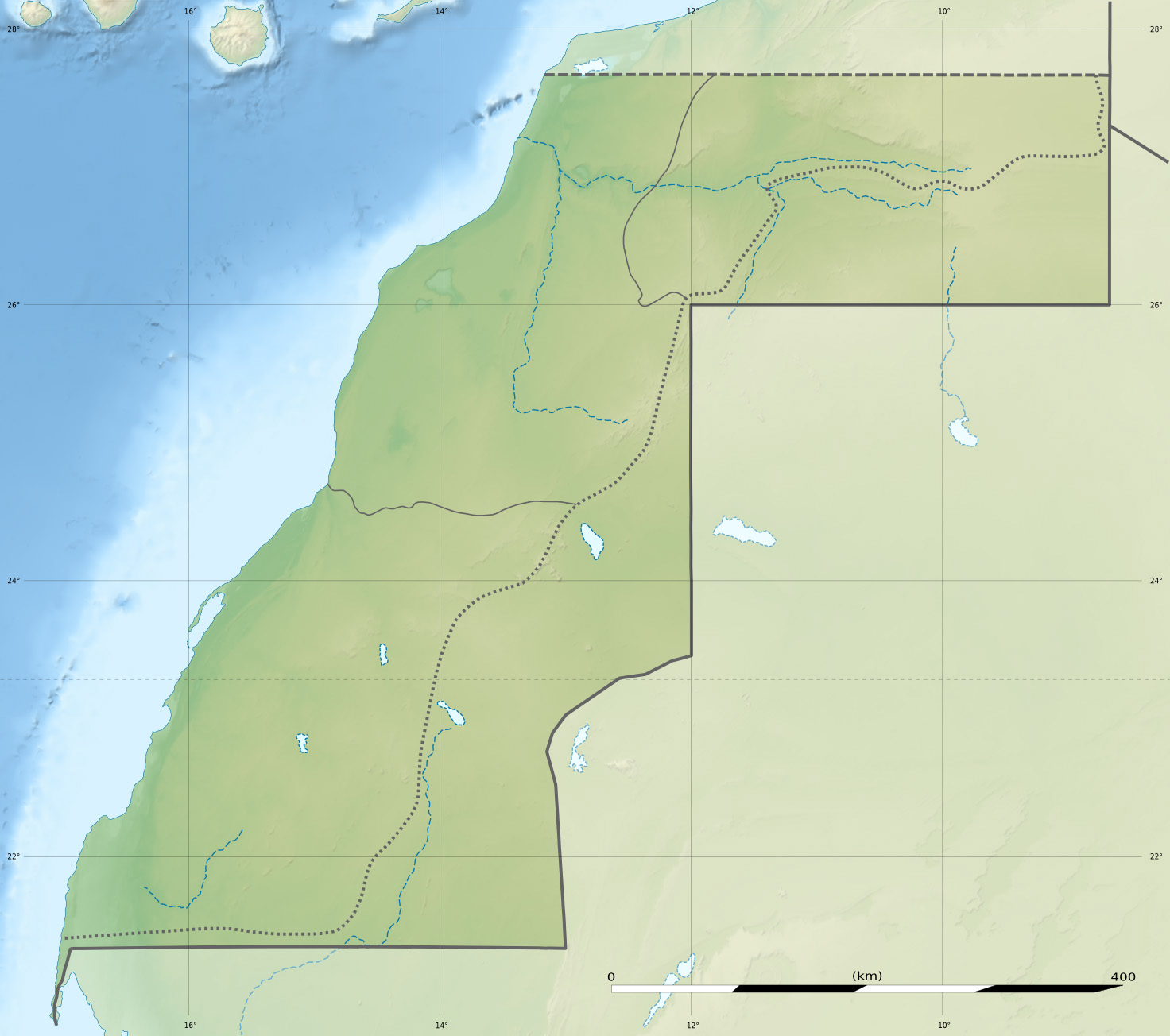
- Location within Western Sahara Location within Africa
- Coordinates: 24.1015°N 13.2757°W
- Territory: Western Sahara
- Claimed by: Kingdom of Morocco; Sahrawi Arab Democratic Republic
- Controlled by: Kingdom of Morocco
- Region: Dakhla-Oued Ed-Dahab
- Province: Oued Ed-Dahab

Area
  - Total: 125.85 km^{2} (48.59 sq mi)

Population (2004)
  - Total: 3,005
  - Density: 23.88/km^{2} (61.84/sq mi)
- Time zone: UTC+0 (GMT)

Oum Dreyga (Spanish: Um Dreiga) is a rural community located in the province of Oued Ed-Dahab in the Dakhla-Oued Ed-Dahab region in Moroccan Western Sahara, with a population of 3,146, according to the 2014 general population and housing census.

It is also the name of a meteorite - Oum Dreyga (Amgala) H3-5 Chondrite Meteorite.
