= Battle of Guelta Zemmur (1981) =

Battle of the Western Sahara War

Battle of Guelta Zemmour
- Part of the Western Sahara War
Date	13–23 October 1981 (10 days)
Location	Guelta Zemmur, Western Sahara
Result	Polisario victory

Belligerents
Morocco	Sahrawi Arab Democratic Republic; Polisario Front

Strength
2,400–2,600	3,000; ~10 T-54, T-55 tanks SA-6

Casualties and losses
200 killed 200 captured 3–5 aircraft	Unknown

The Battle of Guelta Zemmur occurred between 13 and 23 October 1981 when Polisario Front attacked the Moroccan garrison at Guelta Zemmur in Western Sahara. Using heavy military equipment including tanks and surface-to-air missiles, the Polisario Front defeated the Moroccan garrison forces entrenched around the town. Three to Five Moroccan planes were shot down, including a C-130 Hercules. Moroccan armed forces then aggressively counterattacked and drove the Polisario out of the town, but later abandoned it as they retrenched behind the belt.
