= Farsia =

Isolated Village in Western Sahara

Farsia الفرسية El Farsia
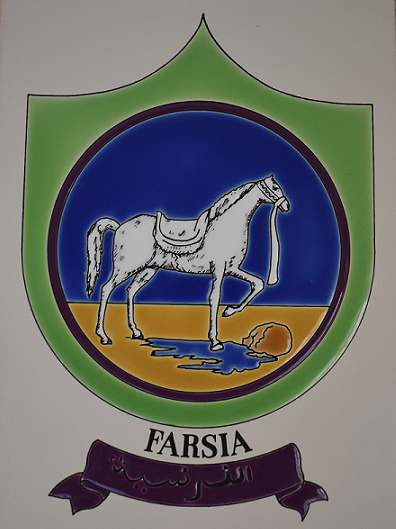
- Coat of arms

- Location within Western Sahara
- Coordinates: 27°9′N 10°58′W
- Non-self-governing territory: Western Sahara
- Region: Laâyoune-Sakia El Hamra
- Province: Es Semara Province
- Municipality: Jdiriya
- Time zone: UTC+0 (GMT)

Farsia (Arabic: الفرسية, romanized: al-Farsīyah, Spanish: El Farsia), is an isolated village in Western Sahara, situated within the Moroccan-occupied territories. It was occupied by the Moroccan military on 31 October 1975, after Spanish troops evacuated their post. The Moroccan forces were later pushed out of Farsia by the Polisario.
