= Zag, Morocco =

Town in Guelmim-Oued Noun, Morocco

Zag الزاك ⵥⵥⴰⴳ
- Town
- Interactive map of Zag
- Coordinates: 28°01′21.33″N 9°17′43.05″W
- Country: Morocco
- Region: Guelmim-Oued Noun
- Province: Assa-Zag Province
- Elevation: 405 m (1,329 ft)

Population (2004)
  - Total: 7,751
- Time zone: UTC+0 (GMT)

Zag (pronounced Ezzag) (Arabic: الزاك, romanized: az-Ẓāk; Standard Moroccan Tamazight: ⵥⵥⴰⴳ) is a town in southern Morocco, in the Assa-Zag province of the Guelmim-Oued Noun region. It lies to the south of the town of Assa and is the last settlement on the road south from there until Western Sahara. According to the 2004 census Zag had a population of 7,751, the second-highest in the province behind Assa and the eighth-highest in the region.
