= Jdiriya =

Rural commune in Western Sahara

Jdiriya اجديرية (Arabic) El Jeriuia (Spanish)
- Rural commune
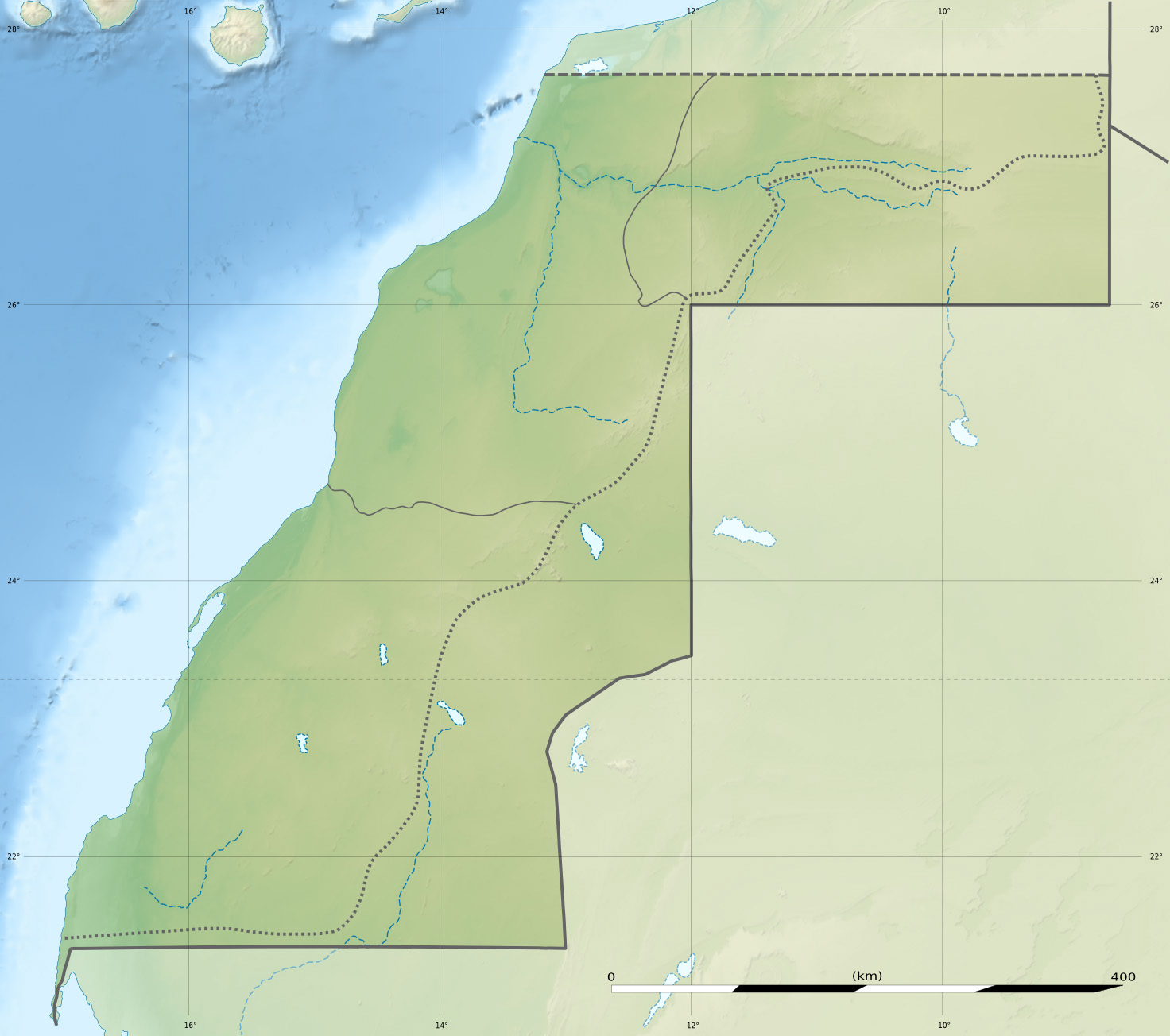
- Location in Western Sahara Jdiriya (Africa)
- Coordinates: 27°14′55″N 10°24′48″W
- Non-self-governing territory: Western Sahara
- Administering power: Spain (de jure)
- Claimed by: Morocco; Sahrawi Republic
- Controlled by: Morocco
- Region: Laâyoune-Sakia El Hamra
- Province: Es Semara

Population (2014)
  - Total: 248
- Time zone: UTC+0 (GMT)

Jdiriya (Arabic: اجديرية; Spanish: El Jeriuia) is a settlement in north-eastern Western Sahara. It is within the Moroccan-occupied area of the territory, some 150 kilometres north of Tifariti and 60 kilometres northeast of Hawza. Under Moroccan occupation, it is organized as a rural commune within Es Semara Province, in the Laâyoune-Sakia El Hamra region. As of the 2014 census, the commune had a total population of 248 people.
