= Bir Anzarane =

- Rural commune and town
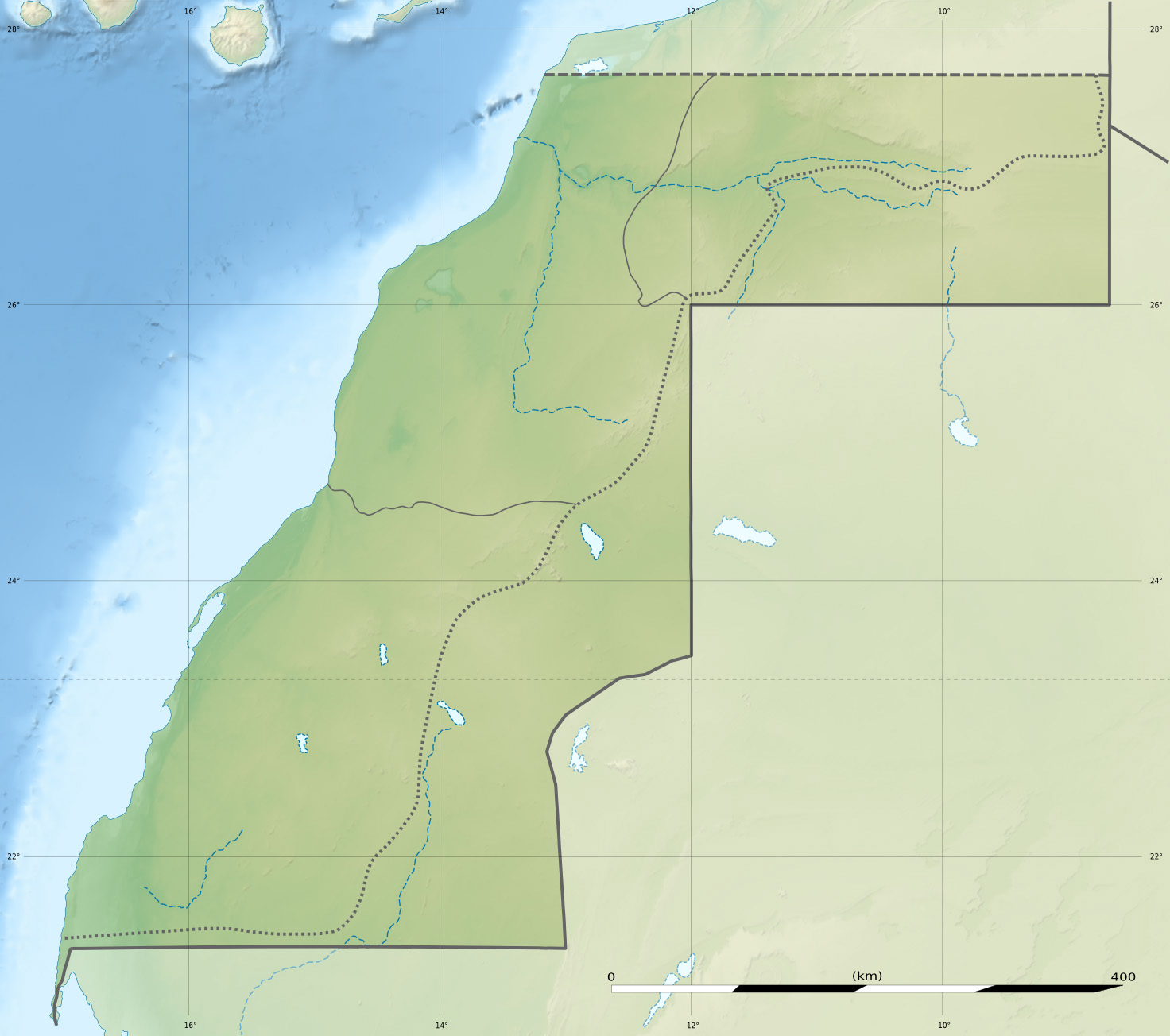
- Location within Western Sahara Location within Africa
- Coordinates: 23.891767°N 14.536397°W
- Territory: Western Sahara
- Claimed by: Morocco; Sahrawi Republic
- Controlled by: Morocco
- Region: Dakhla-Oued Ed-Dahab
- Province: Oued Ed-Dahab

Area
  - Total: 98.1 km^{2} (37.9 sq mi)

Population (2004)
  - Total: 6,597
  - Density: 67.2/km^{2} (174/sq mi)
- Time zone: UTC+0 (GMT)

Bir Anzarane (Arabic: بئر انزران; Spanish: Bir Enzarán) is a town in the disputed area of Western Sahara. It is occupied by Morocco as a rural commune in Oued Ed-Dahab Province in the region of Dakhla-Oued Ed-Dahab. At the time of the 2004 census, the commune had a total population of 6597 people living in 262 households.
