= Haouza =

Coordinates: 27°06′40″N 10°58′17″W

Haouza, also Hawza or Hausa, is a town in Moroccan-occupied Western Sahara, on the west side of the Moroccan Western Sahara Wall that has a population of 8,769 people according to the 2004 census and is twinned with Le Mans, France.
