= Unbound =

Unbound may refer to:

== Arts, entertainment, and media ==
=== Music ===
- Unbound, formerly the name of Deathbound, a four-piece death metal band from Vaasa, Finland
- Unbound, an album by Merciless, 1994
- "Unbound", a song by Ásgeir Trausti, 2017
- "Unbound (The Wild Ride)", a song by Avenged Sevenfold on the album Avenged Sevenfold
- Unbound 01, an EP by Keshia Chanté, 2017

=== Other arts, entertainment, and media ===
- Unbound (book), a 2010 narrative nonfiction book by author Dean King
- Unbound (TV series), a 2025 Japanese television series
- Unbound: An Interactive Journal of Christian Social Justice, an online journal published by the Advisory Committee on Social Witness Policy of the Presbyterian Mission Agency
- Unbound Co., a professional wrestling stable performing in New Japan Pro-Wrestling
- Unbound, a tabletop roleplaying game designed by Grant Howitt in his first collaboration with Christopher Taylor

== Brands and enterprises ==
- Unbound (publisher), a crowd-funded publishing company
- The Unbound Collection by Hyatt, a division of Hyatt hotels

== Organizations ==
- Unbound (nonprofit organization), a nonprofit sponsorship organization headquartered in Kansas City to serve the poor
- Unbound Project, a project celebrating female animal advocates, founded by Jo-Anne McArthur and Keri Cronin

== Other uses ==
- Unbound (DNS server), a validating, recursive, and caching DNS server

== See also ==
- Binding energy, in physics and chemistry
- Bound state, in physics and chemistry
- Boundedness (disambiguation)
- Doctor Who Unbound, series of audio plays in an alternative universe for Doctor Who
- Unbound Gravel, an annual gravel cycling race based out of Emporia, Kansas.
- Frankenstein Unbound, a movie by Roger Corman based on a book by Brian Aldiss
- Need for Speed Unbound, a 2022 racing video game
- Unbound morpheme
- Unbound variable
- Unbounded, a 2023 book by Australian author Maria Thattil
