= Boundedness =

Boundedness, bounded, or unbounded may refer to:

== Economics ==
- Bounded rationality, the idea that human rationality in decision-making is bounded by the available information, the cognitive limitations, and the time available to make the decision
- Bounded emotionality, a concept within communication theory that stems from emotional labor and bounded rationality

== Linguistics ==
- Boundedness (linguistics), whether a situation has a clearly defined beginning or end

== Mathematics ==
- Boundedness axiom, the axiom schema of replacement
- Bounded deformation, a function whose distributional derivatives are not quite well-behaved-enough to qualify as functions of bounded variation, although the symmetric part of the derivative matrix does meet that condition
- Bounded growth, occurs when the growth rate of a mathematical function is constantly increasing at a decreasing rate
- Bounded operator, a linear transformation L between normed vector spaces for which the ratio of the norm of L(v) to that of v is bounded by the same number over all non-zero vectors v
  - Unbounded operator, a linear operator defined on a subspace
- Bounded poset, a partially ordered set that has both a greatest and a least element
- Bounded set, a set that is finite in some sense
  - Bounded function, a function or sequence whose possible values form a bounded set

- Bounded set (topological vector space), a set in which every neighborhood of the zero vector can be inflated to include the set
- Bounded variation, a real-valued function whose total variation is bounded
- Bounded pointer, a pointer that is augmented with additional information that enable the storage bounds within which it may point to be deduced

== Other uses ==
- Unbounded, a 2023 book by Australian author Maria Thattil

== See also ==
- Boundless (disambiguation)
- Unbound (disambiguation)
