= Unbound (book) =

Book by Dean King

Unbound: A True Story of War, Love, and Survival
- Hardcover, 1st edition
- Author: Dean King
- Genre: narrative nonfiction
- Published: March 24, 2010 Little, Brown and Company
- Publication place: United States
- Media type: Print (hardcover); Audiobook (CDs); E-book
- Pages: 432 pp (1st edition, hardcover)
- ISBN: 978-0-316-16708-6
- OCLC: 419263135

Unbound: A True Story of War, Love, and Survival is a narrative nonfiction book by author Dean King. It follows the stories of the 30 women who undertook the Long March as part of the Chinese Red Army in 1934. While only 10,000 of the original 86,000 soldiers survived the 4,000 mile trek, all 30 women survived. To research the project, King interviewed the last surviving woman who marched with the First Army, and delved into historical accounts previously untranslated into English. As with his previous book, the nonfiction national bestseller Skeletons on the Zahara, he also traversed one of the most dangerous portions of the journey on foot, trekking in the Snowy Mountains and on the high-altitude bogs of western Sichuan Province (the deadliest part of the Long March). Unbound has been released in hardback, eBook, and audiobook.

Writing in the Southeast Asia Review, critic Daniel Metraux wrote: "Unbound is a must-read for any student of modern Chinese history and ranks with Edgar Snow's Red Star Over China (1939), as one of the classic narratives of the early Chinese Communist Party."

== Content ==
=== Historical context ===
The context of the story is the Long March, a "desperate" military maneuver begun in October 1934 when Mao Zedong's Red Army (the early Chinese Communist Party) were surrounded by General Chiang Kai-shek's Chinese Nationalist soldiers. Mao's army staged a massive retreat instead of surrendering, and over 86,000 soldiers of the "First Army" fled their enclave in the town of Yudu in Southeastern China. Their hope was to meet up with other Army groups and establish a new stronghold.

Often under fire by Nationalist soldiers and fighter bombers, and harassed by local tribal warlords, the First Army travelled some 4,000 miles in 370 days, a distance similar to walking from San Francisco to New York City and back again. The 11 provinces they crossed included deserts, uncharted bog land with areas similar to quick sand, hundreds of miles of remote wilderness, dozens of overrun rivers, and the frigid heights of the Tibetan Plateau, which included the high-altitude grasslands of the northwestern Sichuan province. They crossed through the Great Snowy Mountains on the border of Tibet, a dangerous portion of the march that reached 14,700 feet in Dagushan. King traversed this portion by foot in his research process. At this point historically, only 20,000 of the original 86,000 of the soldiers were alive.

By the time the soldiers re-established a stronghold in Yan'an in Northern China, fewer than 10,000 of those who had set out still survived. The rest had been killed by battle, disease, exhaustion, exposure (hypothermia, heat exhaustion, altitude sickness), starvation and dehydration. Paranoia killed others, as the terrified army executed an inordinate number of its own people after denouncing them as Nationalists.

=== The women ===
Thirty women undertook the Long March with the First Army, and all survived, though not all finished the Long March. Other women undertook similar Long Marches in the Fourth Army, Second Army, and 25th Army to meet up with the First Army. They ranged in age from 10 to 34, and were a diverse group of individuals. King focuses on those 30 women, telling their stories in detail, and follows representative women from the other armies in parallel narratives. They include Wang Xinlan, 10, a girl from wealth, Ma Yixang, 11, a peasant girl sold by her family, Jin "A Jin" Wiying, a 30-year-old college-educated teacher, and Zhou "Young Orchid" Shaolan, 17, a nurse who refused to go home when the army told her to.

Ideology

Many of the women saw the party as a promising feminist alternative to repressive attitudes towards Chinese women. Communist ideology was against the crippling practice of foot binding, and arranged marriages (which often became little more than forced servitude and destitution), and encouraged the education of women and introducing them into leadership roles in the workforce. Preaching equality, the Party welcomed women, particularly for recruiting and propaganda roles.

Tasks

During the Long March the women engaged in battle, carried the wounded off battle fields, often came under enemy fire, and were subject to the same trials and diseases as the men. They also carried the sick, sewed shoes and clothing, searched for healing herbs and food, and even spun wool. They shepherded stretcher teams and wounded across raging rivers. The army even carried costumes and sets so the women could entertain the troops after a day of marching. They were in charge of propaganda as well, recruiting hundreds of soldiers along the way, as well as nurses and more women. The women were generally treated as equal comrades-in-arms by their fellow soldiers. However, their situation did not always lead to complete equality, as it was not uncommon for some of the women to be relegated to traditional female tasks such as cooking and laundry.

Pregnancy

Several of the women, including Mao's wife He Zizhen, became or were already pregnant during the Long March. However, as there was no way to care for infants, particularly with the harsh terrain, half a dozen children born along the route were left with peasant families or to be discovered in abandoned villages. Mao's daughter was left in the care of an elderly blind woman, the only person who had not fled the village she lived in. Other women told stories of suffering amenorrhea, and some believe the trek across the Snowy Mountains triggered early menopause, rendering them infertile.

After the march

Of the women accompanying the First Army and Mao, two would go on to serve on the Party's Central Committee, one became a provincial party chief, and one eventually became one of the powerful Eight Elders of China. Others became leaders in arts and industry organizations, while many other survivors became victim to the atrocities and cultural purges of Mao's 1966 Cultural Revolution.

== Research ==
The research took King four-and-a-half years and two trips to China, in which he interviewed the last living woman survivor of the March (who has since died). He also drew deeply from first-person accounts of survivors and a range of historical scholarship, much of which was never before translated into English. King spent July 2009 in China's Sichuan province, trekking eight days through treacherous highland bogs and hiking up the Dagushan Mountain on the Tibetan border. As with his previous book Skeletons on the Zahara, his goal was to retrace his historical protagonists' dangerous journey. King has stated his some of his research involved sifting through the inaccurate mythology and propaganda that has since warped perception of the event.

== Release ==
=== Publishing history ===
The book was published as a first edition Hardcover by Little, Brown and Company on March 24, 2010, in English only. An eBook version, published by Hachette Digital, Inc., was made available in March 2010. There is also a version available for Kindle and NOOKbook (Barnes & Noble). The Library Edition, released by Tantor Media, is a complete audiobook CD (ISBN 978-14001440-68), also released on March 24, 2010. It is 12 hours long, and spans 10 CDs. It is also available at Wal-mart. At the back of the book the publishers included a listing of all the women of the March.

=== Reception ===
The Richmond Times quoted that the book "is an authoritative account of the Long March, but its evocations of the marchers' experiences will linger long after the historical details slip from readers' memories."

The book was also received positively by other authors and historians in the field. In 2010, Southeast Review of Asian Studies stated that "Unbound is a must-read for any student of modern Chinese history and ranks with Edgar Snow's Red Star Over China (1939) as one of the classic narratives of the early days of the Chinese Communist Party."

Helen Praeger Young, author of the 2001 book Choosing Revolution: Chinese Women Soldiers on the Long March, stated "Unbound will appeal to every reader who likes history that is exciting, accessible and full of the stories of people who perform extraordinary acts of heroism and endurance. How wonderful that this bit of Chinese history is brought to us in such a riveting and personal way."

Ed Jocelyn, author of the 2006 book The Long March, stated "King gets to the heart of one of history's greatest adventures. He captures the blood, guts and occasional glory of the Chinese Revolution. This is a remarkable tale, by turns thrilling, inspiring and heartbreaking."

Lily Xiao Hong, author of the 2008 book Women of the Long March, which follows four of the 30 women, stated "King's book differs from earlier works on this subject in that it does not try to include too many historical details but concentrates on telling the story. He has succeeded in given just enough background information to provide a genuine and moving account of the women who went on the Long March."

== See also ==
- The Long March
- Women in the People's Republic of China
