= Boundless =

Boundless may refer to:

- Boundless (album), a 2001 album by Rajaton
- Boundless (company), an American textbook company
- Boundless (video game), a video game
- Boundless (Canadian TV series), a reality TV series
- Boundless, online literary magazine launched in 2017 by Unbound (publisher)
- Boundless (2022 TV series), a Spanish miniseries
- Boundless.org, a website for young adults operated by Focus on the Family
- Boundless by CSMA, a club for civil servants in the United Kingdom
- Boundless Technologies or SunRiver Data Systems, an IT company
- "Boundless", a song by Aero Chord
- The Boundless, a young adult novel by Kenneth Oppel
- Apeiron, a concept in ancient Greek cosmology translated as "boundless"

== See also ==
- Boundedness (disambiguation)
