= Poncelet map =

A poncelet map is an algebraic dynamical system defined by two conics and the following procedure:

1. Pick a starting point on the outer conic
2. Draw a line from the point that is tangent to the inner conic
3. This line intersects the outer conic at a new point
4. Repeat the process from step 2

Given these are algebraic curves and these are relations of intersections and tangents, the map can be defined purely by algebraic equations and therefore is an algebraic dynamical system.

One important property is the Poncelet's closure theorem.
