= Kaplan–Yorke map =

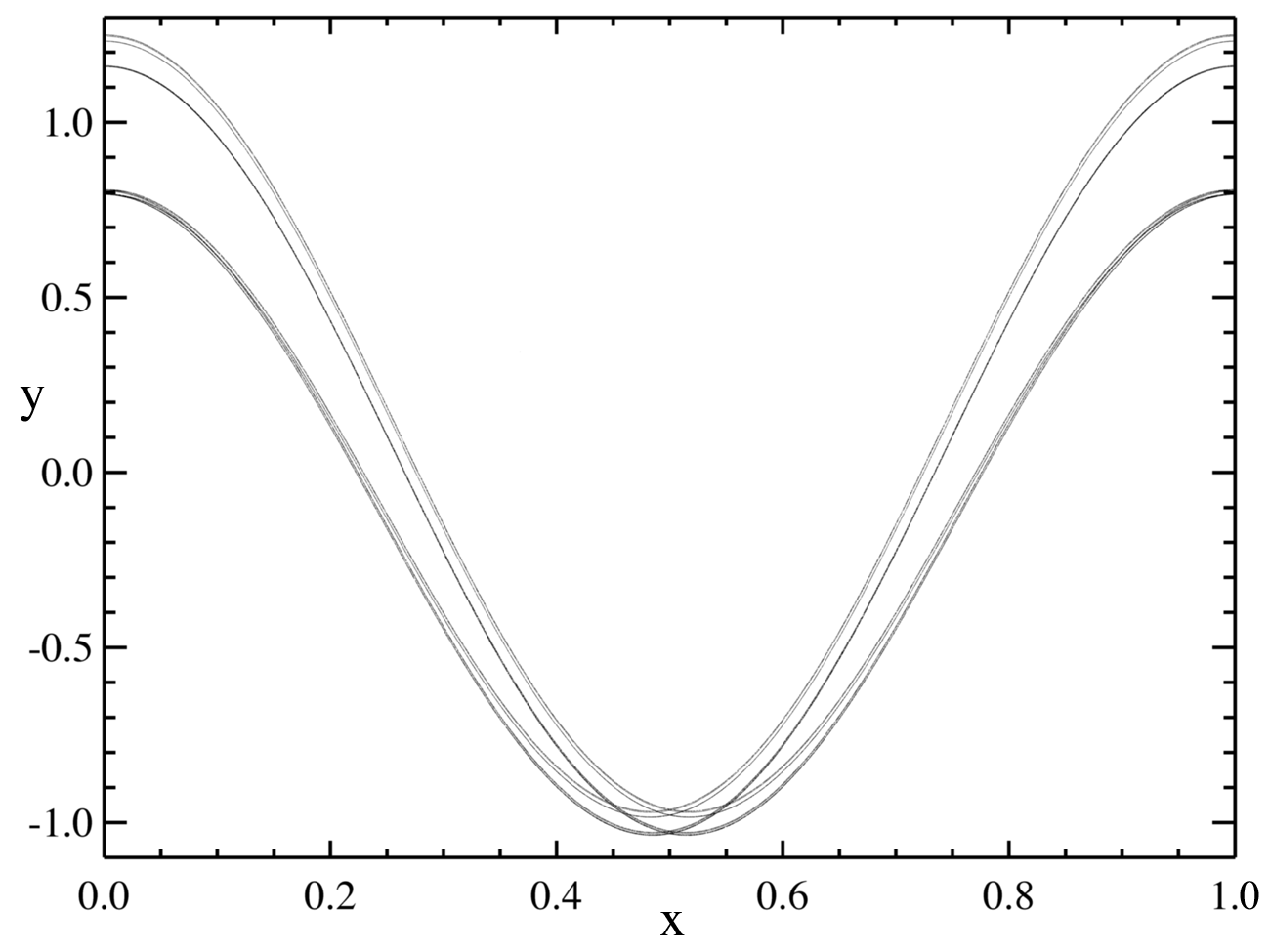
A plot of 100,000 iterations of the Kaplan-Yorke map with α=0.2. The initial value (x_{0},y_{0}) was (128873/350377,0.667751).

The Kaplan–Yorke map is a discrete-time dynamical system. It is an example of a dynamical system that exhibits chaotic behavior. The Kaplan–Yorke map takes a point (x_{n}, y_{n} ) in the plane and maps it to a new point given by

$$x_{n+1}=2x_n\ (\textrm{mod}~1)$$
$$y_{n+1}=\alpha y_n+\cos(4\pi x_n)$$

where mod is the modulo operator with real arguments. The map depends on only the one constant α.

== Calculation method ==
Due to roundoff error, successive applications of the modulo operator will yield zero after some ten or twenty iterations when implemented as a floating point operation on a computer. It is better to implement the following equivalent algorithm:

$$a_{n+1}=2a_n\ (\textrm{mod}~b)$$
$$x_{n+1}=a_n/b$$
$$y_{n+1}=\alpha y_n+\cos(4\pi x_n)$$

where the $a_n$ and $b$ are computational integers. It is also best to choose $b$ to be a large prime number in order to get many different values of $x_n$.

Another way to avoid having the modulo operator yield zero after a short number of iterations is

$$x_{n+1}=2x_n\ (\textrm{mod}~0.99995)$$

$$y_{n+1}=\alpha y_n+\cos(4\pi x_n)$$

which will still eventually return zero, albeit after many more iterations.
