= Dean King =

American naval historian (born 1962)

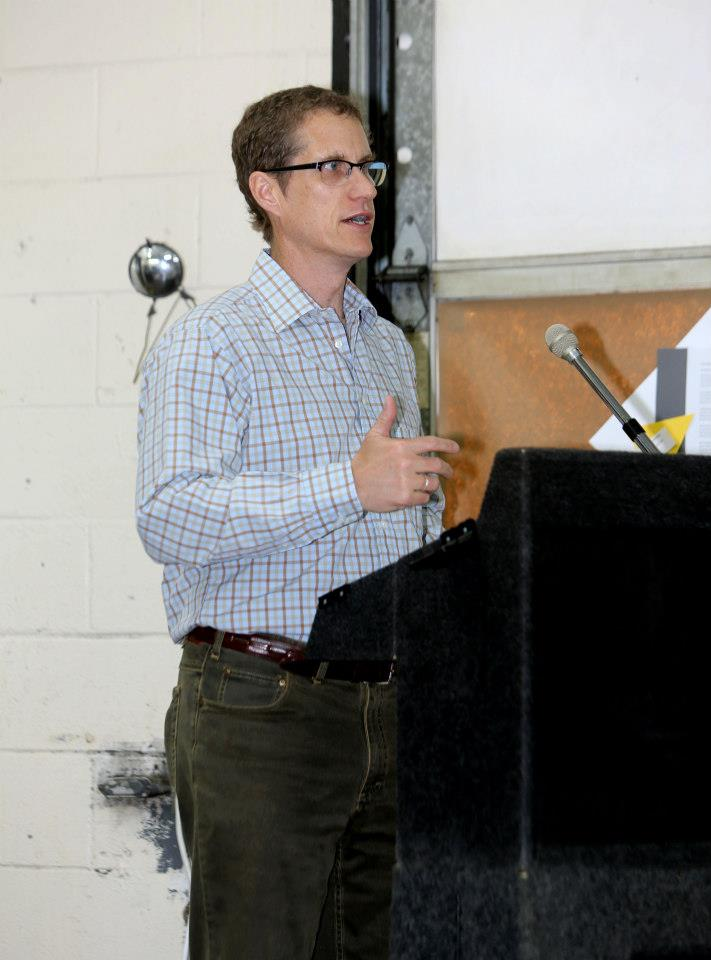
- Dean at Christopher Newport University
- Born: Dean H. King; 1962 (age 63–64); Richmond, Virginia
- Education: University of North Carolina, B.A. New York University, M.A.
- Occupations: Author, historian
- Spouse: Jessica King
- Writing career
- Language: English
- Period: 1993–present
- Genres: Biography, history, non-fiction adventure, maritime
- Website: deanhking.com

Dean King (born 1962) is an American author of narrative non-fiction on adventure, historical and maritime subjects. His books include Skeletons on the Zahara (2004) and Unbound (2010), both published by Little, Brown. He is the author of companion books to Patrick O'Brian's Aubrey-Maturin series of novels and is the first biographer of O'Brian. In his biography, Patrick O'Brian: A Life (2000), which was excerpted in four full pages in The Daily Telegraph in London, King revealed that O'Brian was not really of Irish origin, as O'Brian claimed, and that he had changed his name by deed poll in London in 1945. King has also published articles in The New York Times, National Geographic Adventure, New York Magazine, Outside and other magazines and newspapers.

== Early life and education ==
King was born and raised in Richmond, Virginia, where he attended St. Christopher's School. He then attended the University of North Carolina, where he played on UNC's 1982 National Champion Lacrosse team and edited the undergraduate literary magazine while earning his bachelor's degree in English. He was also a member of the North Carolina Xi chapter of Sigma Alpha Epsilon. After graduating, he and a friend spent a week and a half walking across the entirety of England. He earned his master's degree in English at New York University, studying under Gloria Naylor, John A. Williams, and E. L. Doctorow.

== Writing career ==
=== Magazines ===
After further travel in England and France, King worked for a decade in New York City. While there he became an original contributing editor to Men's Journal and wrote for other publications, including Esquire, Art & Antiques, Travel + Leisure Magazine, Connoisseur, and The New York Times. He is a past director of book publishing at National Review.

In the early 1990s he also founded the out-of-print Bubba Magazine, a publication that poked fun at Bill Clinton. The publication garnered national press after its February 9, 1993, debut, with media outlets such as Entertainment Tonight booking interviews.

=== Non-fiction books ===
King has published ten books, most with a focus on historical and adventure narratives. Many of King's works focus on sea adventure and maritime history, and he is past series editor for the Heart of Oak Sea Classics.

In 1995 King co-authored A Sea of Words with naval historian John B. Hattendorf and J. Worth Estes, and two years later he again worked with Hattendorf to edit and publish Every Man Will Do His Duty. Both are companion books to Patrick O'Brian's Aubrey-Maturin series of novels. In 2000 he also wrote a historically significant but unauthorized biography of famed author Patrick O'Brian, which was published just three months after O'Brian's death. This book, Patrick O'Brian: A Life Revealed, was named a book of the year by The Daily Telegraph, and King appeared in a BBC documentary about O'Brian, as well as on ABC World News Tonight and NPR's Talk of the Nation.

For his 2004 non-fiction book, Skeletons on the Zahara, he traveled more than 100 miles across the western Sahara Desert on foot and by camel in order to experience a similar journey to Captain James Riley. During research for Unbound: A True Story of War, Love, and Survival he spent July 2009 in China's Sichuan province, trekking eight days through treacherous highland bogs and hiking up the Dagushan Mountain on the Tibetan border. As with Africa, his goal was to retrace his historical protagonists' dangerous journey, in this case the 30 women who walked 4,000 miles in the Communists' Long March with Mao Zedong in 1934.

== Community work ==
In the early 2000s, Dean was part of a group of Richmond writer friends, including founder and best-selling novelist David L. Robbins, to create the nonprofit James River Writers, which promotes and encourages local authors. He is past co-chair and advisory board member. King also helped establish the James River Writers Conference, which is held annually at the Richmond Library of Virginia. King is also frequently asked to give talks to schools and community groups. He serves on the boards of the Library of Virginia Foundation and the Virginia Center for the Creative Arts (VCCA). He is a founder and co-chair of the Virginia Literary Festival (VLF), a week-long, multi-organizational celebration of reading and authors in Richmond.

== Personal life ==
King is a cancer survivor and avid hiker. He currently lives in his hometown of Richmond, Virginia with his wife Jessica and their four daughters: Hazel, Grace, Willa, and Nora.

== Published works ==
=== As contributing editor ===
- The Penny Pincher's Almanac Handbook for Modern Frugality (1992) - edited by King and the editors of The Penny Pincher's Almanac
- Every Man Will Do His Duty: An Anthology of Firsthand Accounts From the Age of Nelson (1997) - edited by King with naval historian John B. Hattendorf
- Cancer Combat: Cancer Survivors Share Their Guerrilla Tactics to Help you Win the Fight of Your Life (1998) - edited by Dean King, Jessica King & Jonathan Pearlroth

=== As author ===
- A Sea of Words: a Lexicon and Companion for Patrick O'Brian's Seafaring Tales (1995) - co-authored by John B. Hattendorf and J. Worth Estes
- Paper Clips to Printers: the Cost-cutting Sourcebook for Your Home Office (1996) - co-authored with Jessica King
- Patrick O'Brian: a Life Revealed (2000)
- Harbors and High Seas: an Atlas and Geographical Guide to the Complete Aubrey-Maturin Novels of Patrick O'Brian (2000) - co-authored with John B. Hattendorf
- Skeletons on the Zahara: a True Story of Survival (2004)
- Unbound: a True Story of War, Love, and Survival (2010)
- The Feud: The Hatfields and McCoys: The True Story (2013)
- Guardians of the Valley: John Muir and the Friendship that Saved Yosemite (2023)
