= Bounded emotionality =

Concept in communication theory

Bounded emotionality is a communications studies approach to dealing with emotional control in the workplace. Emotional control simply refers to how employers and employees handle the range of emotions that naturally occur in the workplace. These emotions can occur because of work, or they can be brought into work from an employee's home life. Bounded emotionality was proposed by Dennis K. Mumby and Linda Putnam.

Mumby and Putnam (1992) stress that bounded emotionality encourages the expression of a wide range of emotions. Their theory encourages expression of emotions because it is a way to maintain interpersonal relationships and boundaries among people in the organization. Additionally, the expression of emotions strengthens work relations because people bond over mutual feelings. Bounded emotionality is a broad framework for organizations to use when dealing with emotions. It has six defining characteristics. The characteristics are: intersubjective limitations, spontaneously emergent work feelings, tolerance of ambiguity, heterarchy of values, integrated self identity and authenticity, and community.

== Origins ==
Prior to Mumby and Putnam's specific articulation of bounded emotionality research and the role it plays in what is known about organizational emotion regulation, workplace emotion research focused on the relationship between emotion regulation, work performance and general attitudes towards work. Traditionally, two concepts, bounded rationality and emotional labor, were used to describe conventional organizational theory pertaining to emotional regulation.

=== Bounded rationality ===
Whereas bounded emotionality encourages the expression of a large spectrum of emotions in organizational communication, bounded rationality advocates for the "control" or tempering of any emotion or personal characteristics that may interfere with rational organizational decision making. Simon introduced the term bounded rationality and cast it as "bounded" because he viewed highly emotion-based forms of reasoning such as intuition and judgement as irrational and thus unhelpful in reaching organizational goals. Bounded rationality approaches to emotional regulation not only devalue individual emotion in the workplace but also view excessive emotional expression as inappropriate for the work setting.

=== Emotional labor ===
Emotional labor refers to the way in which individuals manage emotions based on what is perceived as "appropriate" in specific social or environmental situations. Human beings often pay close attention to their surroundings and how they should act in certain social situations. A variety of organizational factors as well as personal factors may impact emotional regulation including: socialization, channels of communication, departmental differences (e.g. sales vs. packaging), etc. In an organization that deploys a bounded emotionality approach to emotional regulation, much less emotional labor will be required than an organization that deploys a bounded rationality approach.

Mumby and Putnam introduced the concept of bounded emotionality as an alternative organizational concept to bounded rationality and emotional labor in order to demonstrate the instability of traditional understandings and highlight what they believe to be the importance of emotions in organizational decision-making. In an organization framed by bounded emotionality (as opposed to bounded rationality and emotional labor), hierarchical goals and values are flexible as emotion and the physical self are not isolated from the process of organizing. In other words, emotions are "bounded" in organizations to protect interpersonal relationships and mutual understandings, two organizational aspects that Mumby and Putnam argue as important to success.

== Bounded vs. unbounded emotionality ==
Unbounded emotionality should be enacted not for the instrumental gain of the organization, but to enhance the well-being of the individual organizational members. Work stress is a political, organizational and community issue that can be difficult to implement in large organizations.

Bounded emotionality is a limited, pragmatic approach to the problem of emotional control in organizations. It focuses on work related emotions, defined as, "feelings, sensations, and affective responses to organizational sensations". However, it is acknowledged that such work feelings stem from and affect emotions that come from one's personal life.

- It encourages the expression of a wider range of emotions than is usually condoned in traditional and normative organizations.
- It stresses the importance of maintaining interpersonally sensitive, variable boundaries between what is felt and what is expressed.
- The goal of bounded emotionality to build interpersonal relationships through mutual understanding of work related feelings.

The following table shows six differentiating characteristics.

Bounded emotionality	Unbounded emotionality
Personal limitations	Organizational limitations
Implicit	Explicit
Heterarchy	Hierarchy
Integration of body and mind	Separation of body and mind
Community	Individual
Relational feeling rules	Gender/occupational feeling rules

== Defining characteristics ==
Intersubjective limitations: This is a necessary restriction known by individuals in the organization that helps them adequately work with and respond to one another . Just as individuals do in personal relationships, they need to respect emotional boundaries in professional ones.

Example: If a coworker feels certain emotional expressions or topics are inappropriate, you will not discuss them. Similarly, they will respect what you find inappropriate. Those personal boundaries are the intersubjective limitations of the work relationship. For instance, a cabin crew member may be absolutely repulsed by vomit, but when a passenger vomits that cabin crew member controls the disgust and helps calm the passenger down.

Spontaneously emergent work feelings: Feelings about work emerge in response to work tasks. Generally these form around the organizations climate and environment. This is natural and management should not try to ascribe feelings to employees. When spontaneous feelings emerge they should be dealt with within the previously set intersubjective limitations.

Example: An example of this would be a study done on hair stylists. The study found that for the employee they found enjoyment when a customer confided in them about a private matter. That consumer as well would find it satisfying, therefore more likely to return.

Tolerance of ambiguity: Complex emotions are likely to occur because of emotional labor (the process of controlling emotions during interactions at work). Bounded emotionality entails tolerance of these complex emotions. Contradictory feelings must coexist. This constitutes a new norm that wants to be aware of different positions, and even those directly opposite among its organizational members.

Example: People with low tolerance of ambiguity experience stress react prematurely and avoid ambiguous stimuli. The person with high tolerance will look at ambiguous situations as desirable, challenging, and interesting.

Heterarchy of values: The opposite of hierarchy of values, or placing certain values as more important than others. A heterarchy of values means that no one is set above another. The context of situations and individual preferences determines what values may be prioritized in a given moment. There is not just one universal set of values guiding one's life choices. Heterarchy is designed for handling the innovative side of things therefore it requires a different form of conflict management. This helps prevent undermining the governing logic.

Example: An individual may highly value human life and be against abortion rights, but may be for the death penalty, or the other way around.

Integrated self identity and authenticity: Bounded emotionality assumes that people have one single identity. This means that their personality, their values, and their actions are the same no matter where they are physically. The goal of bounded emotionality is to make it easy to be one's true self while at work. It means you are part of a social collective working toward obtaining goals for your organization.

Example: If an actor brings in private experiences to create an original character presentation.

Community: The purpose of bounded emotionality is to create a strong sense of community among its members. There is a need for connections within freedom and for diversity within individuality. Research has shown this structure works best in smaller organizations.

Example: When a director encourages questions and then the director discusses performance related critiques with them afterwards developing a sense of togetherness.
