= Bounded deformation =

In mathematics, a function of bounded deformation is a function whose distributional derivatives are not quite well-behaved-enough to qualify as functions of bounded variation, although the symmetric part of the derivative matrix does meet that condition. Thought of as deformations of elasto-plastic bodies, functions of bounded deformation play a major role in the mathematical study of materials, e.g. the Francfort-Marigo model of brittle crack evolution.

More precisely, given an open subset Ω of R^{n}, a function u : Ω → R^{n} is said to be of bounded deformation if the symmetrized gradient ε(u) of u,

$$\varepsilon(u) = \frac{\nabla u + \nabla u^{\top}}{2}$$

is a bounded, symmetric n × n matrix-valued Radon measure. The collection of all functions of bounded deformation is denoted BD(Ω; R^{n}), or simply BD, introduced essentially by P.-M. Suquet in 1978. BD is a strictly larger space than the space BV of functions of bounded variation.

One can show that if u is of bounded deformation then the measure ε(u) can be decomposed into three parts: one absolutely continuous with respect to Lebesgue measure, denoted e(u) dx; a jump part, supported on a rectifiable (n − 1)-dimensional set J_{u} of points where u has two different approximate limits u_{+} and u_{−}, together with a normal vector ν_{u}; and a "Cantor part", which vanishes on Borel sets of finite H^{n−1}-measure (where H^{k} denotes k-dimensional Hausdorff measure).

A function u is said to be of special bounded deformation if the Cantor part of ε(u) vanishes, so that the measure can be written as

$$\varepsilon(u) = e(u) \, \mathrm{d} x + \big( u_{+}(x) - u_{-}(x) \big) \odot \nu_{u} (x) H^{n - 1} | J_{u},$$

where H^{n−1} | J_{u} denotes H^{n−1} on the jump set J_{u} and $\odot$ denotes the symmetrized dyadic product:

$$a \odot b = \frac{a \otimes b + b \otimes a}{2}.$$

The collection of all functions of special bounded deformation is denoted SBD(Ω; R^{n}), or simply SBD.
