= Skeletons on the Zahara =

2004 book by Dean King

- Hardbook Edition cover
- Author: Dean King
- Publisher: Little, Brown and Company
- Publication date: February 16, 2004
- Publication place: United States
- Media type: Print (hardback & paperback), audio cassette
- Pages: 368 pp (first edition, hardcover)
- ISBN: 978-0-316-83514-5

Skeletons on the Zahara: A True Story of Survival is a 2004 nonfiction book written by maritime historian Dean King. It is based on two of the survivors' journals, primarily Captain James Riley's memoir Sufferings in Africa. To research the book, Dean King embarked on a National Geographic Society sponsored expedition to retrace the horrific journey of Riley and his crew across the Saharan ("Zahara") desert. A screenplay adaptation was in 2010 reportedly being written by Roman Bennett for Independent studios.

== Research ==
King was first inspired to research the subject in 1995 when he was in the New York Yacht Club library researching Harbors and High Seas, which he would publish in 2000. He spotted an old leather-bound book on a shelf with the title Sufferings In Africa. Originally published in 1817 and sub-titled An Authentic Narrative of the Loss of the American Brig Commerce, the book is a first-hand account written by Captain James Riley, an American sea captain wrecked off the coast of North Africa in his ship Commerce. After narrowly escaping capture by nomadic Arabs plundering the wreck, Riley and his crew made a futile attempt at sea in a longboat, and upon return to shore were forced into slavery by Arab tribesmen.

King did extensive research on the misadventure, often using the libraries at the University of Richmond and the Library of Virginia, and even the Science Museum of Virginia. He soon discovered there was a second first-hand account written by Archibald Robbins, another surviving member of Riley's crew. Knowing sailors are notorious for embellishing their histories, he crosschecked the accounts, something no academic had yet done. King found that Archibald's A Journal: Comprising an Account of the Loss of the Brig Commerce was accurate to Sufferings in Africa in most significant details.

Both autobiographies had been international bestsellers upon their release, and Riley and Robbins were national heroes in their own time. When he was a boy, Abraham Lincoln read An Authentic Narrative of the Loss of the American Brig Commerce and would later cite it as one of the books that most influenced him, and he would often refer to it during his presidency. After his experiences, Riley had been a staunch abolitionist. The adventure story also influenced James Fenimore Cooper and Henry David Thoreau.

After his initial research, King had written a proposal and already signed a $750,000 contract with Little, Brown and Company for the book project.

=== Travels with National Geographic ===
In order to more fully understand the travails of the sailors, King decided to personally retrace their struggles through the desert. He planned the trip for a year. The trip cost about $20,000, by King's estimate. National Geographic Adventure magazine paid part of the cost, and the rest came from an advance from King's publisher. The trip was scheduled for the week after the September 11, 2001 attacks, and King and his crew landed in Casablanca the day the United States started bombing Afghanistan. From Casablanca they flew to Western Sahara, a disputed territory now controlled by Morocco, where the nervous military police occasionally hindered their attempts to follow Riley's exact route.

Also on the team were neighbor Ted Lawrence and Lawrence's wife Claudia D'Andrea. Both had experience doing peacekeeping work in East Timor. J.P. Kang served as their technology specialist and Remi Bengali served as their National Geographic photographer. Their guides were Ali and Mohammed el Arab.

Journey by camel

They traveled more than 100 miles across the western Sahara Desert on foot and by camel in order to experience a similar journey to Captain Riley. While they tried to avoid dangerous extremes of dehydration, starvation, and sunburn, King claims they experienced eerily similar events to Riley, King even falling off his camel in an identical way. King subjected himself to running barefoot across burning sand and sharp rocks, and scaling dangerous cliffs. He also endured the camel's torturous gait, called "the rack". "It was brutal," King says. "After [riding for] 20 miles, I was bleeding through a hole in my back. It was like sitting on a jackhammer."

King was surprised to see that much of the land had stayed relatively unchanged since 1815.

== Publishing ==
The book was published by Little, Brown, & Co. on February 16, 2004.

By April 2004, the paperback edition was on the San Francisco Chronicle's non-fiction bestseller list at No.6, and was climbing The New York Times Extended Bestseller List at No. 20. In the non-fiction category the book was #13 on the Book Sense national bestseller list, #5 on Southeast Booksellers AssociatioN list, #15 on the Mountains and Plains Booksellers Association, #11 at the Northern California Booksellers Association, #13 at the Southern California Booksellers Association, and #10 at the New Atlantic Booksellers Association bestsellers list.

In November 2004, Amazon.com listed Skeletons of the Zahara as their #6 Best History Book of 2004.

=== Media coverage ===
The book garnered reviews in hundreds of publications such as The Sunday Times, The Times, The Seattle Times, The San Diego Union-Tribune, the Minneapolis Star, Time, Pittsburgh Tribune-Review, The Washington Post, Publishers Weekly, the San Francisco Chronicle, Variety.com, The Richmond Times-Dispatch, the Los Angeles Times, and Entertainment Weekly. In February 2004 National Geographic Adventure Magazine included a write-up of King's travels in Africa.

Entertainment Weekly wrote that "King is almost pornographic in his description of physical pain: skin bubbles, eyeballs burn, lips blacken, and men shrivel to less than 90 pounds…It's sensational stuff."

== Film version ==
Screenwriters Doug Miro and Carlo Bernard, writers of the 2005 film The Great Raid, were behind King's project since they first saw his book proposal in 2001. They wrote a screenplay based on King's proposal, and with King's blessing, they shopped it around to Hollywood studios.

Intermedia executive Alex Litvak brought the book to his company in 2001, and they optioned the rights. In April 2004 it was announced that Steven Spielberg's film production company DreamWorks had bought the movie rights from Intermedia. DreamWorks was set to co-finance the project and provide distribution, while Intermedia was set to produce with Paula Weinstein and Barry Levinson. Shooting was intended to begin before the end of 2004, though a director and crew were never decided upon.

In September 2010 it was announced that Roman Bennett, the screenwriter for Public Enemies, is writing a new script based on the book. The London-based sales company Independent is developing and producing. Previously responsible for the film Moon, Independent has not named a cast or director, though they claim to be seeking a prominent American actor to play Captain Riley.
