= Barbary slave trade =

Slave markets in North Africa

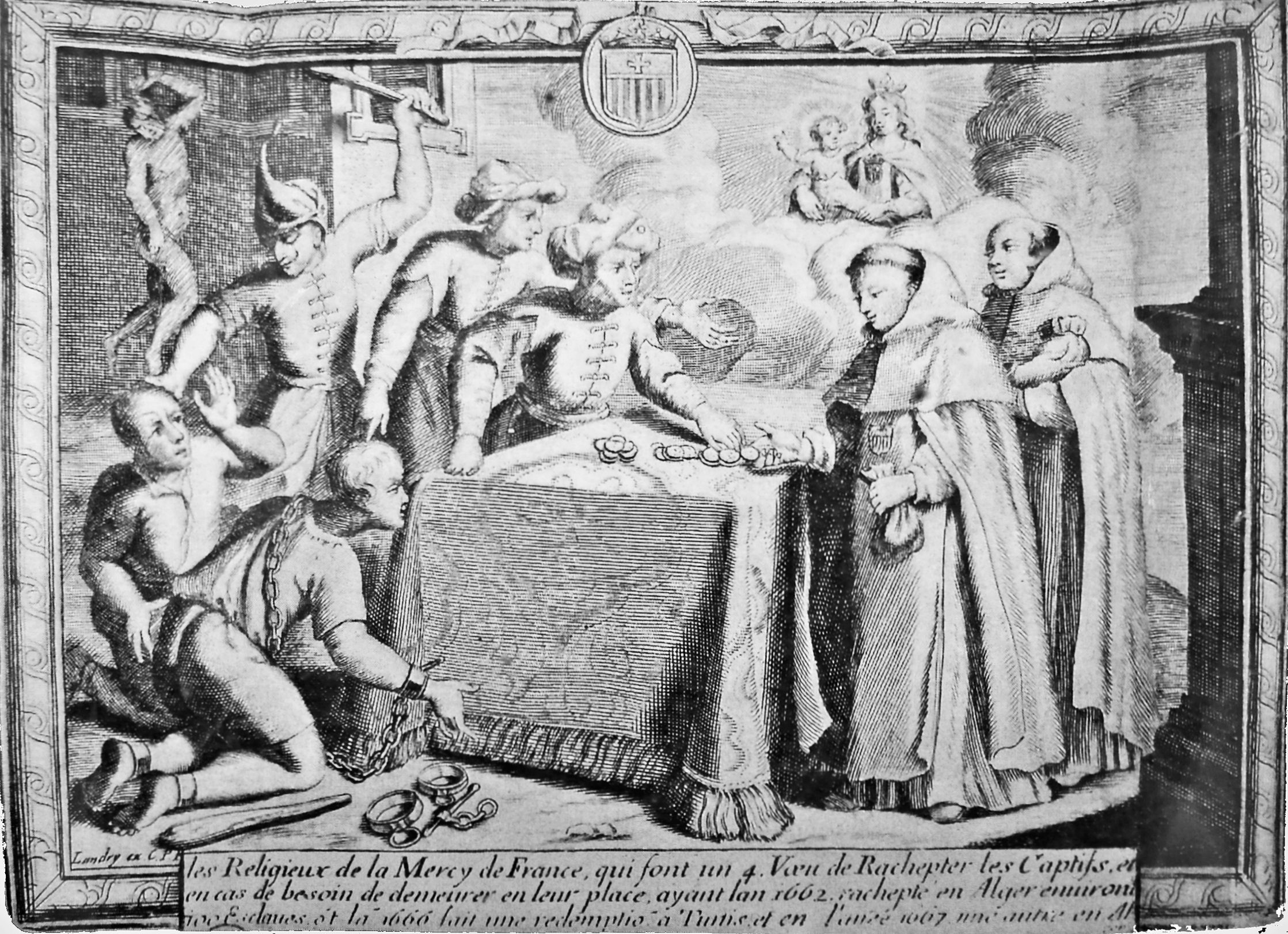
The redemption (buying back) of Christian captives by Mercedarian friars in the Barbary states

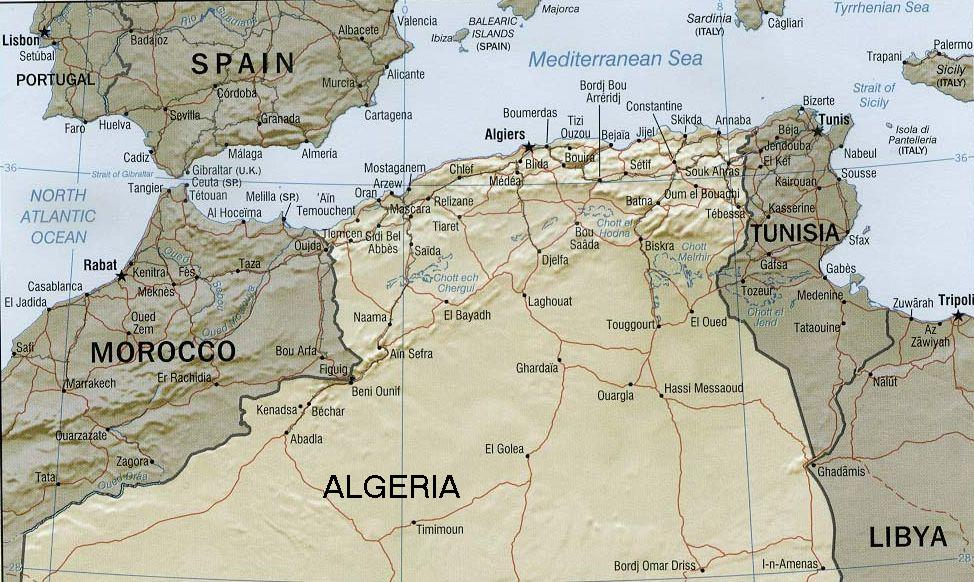
The Barbary Coast

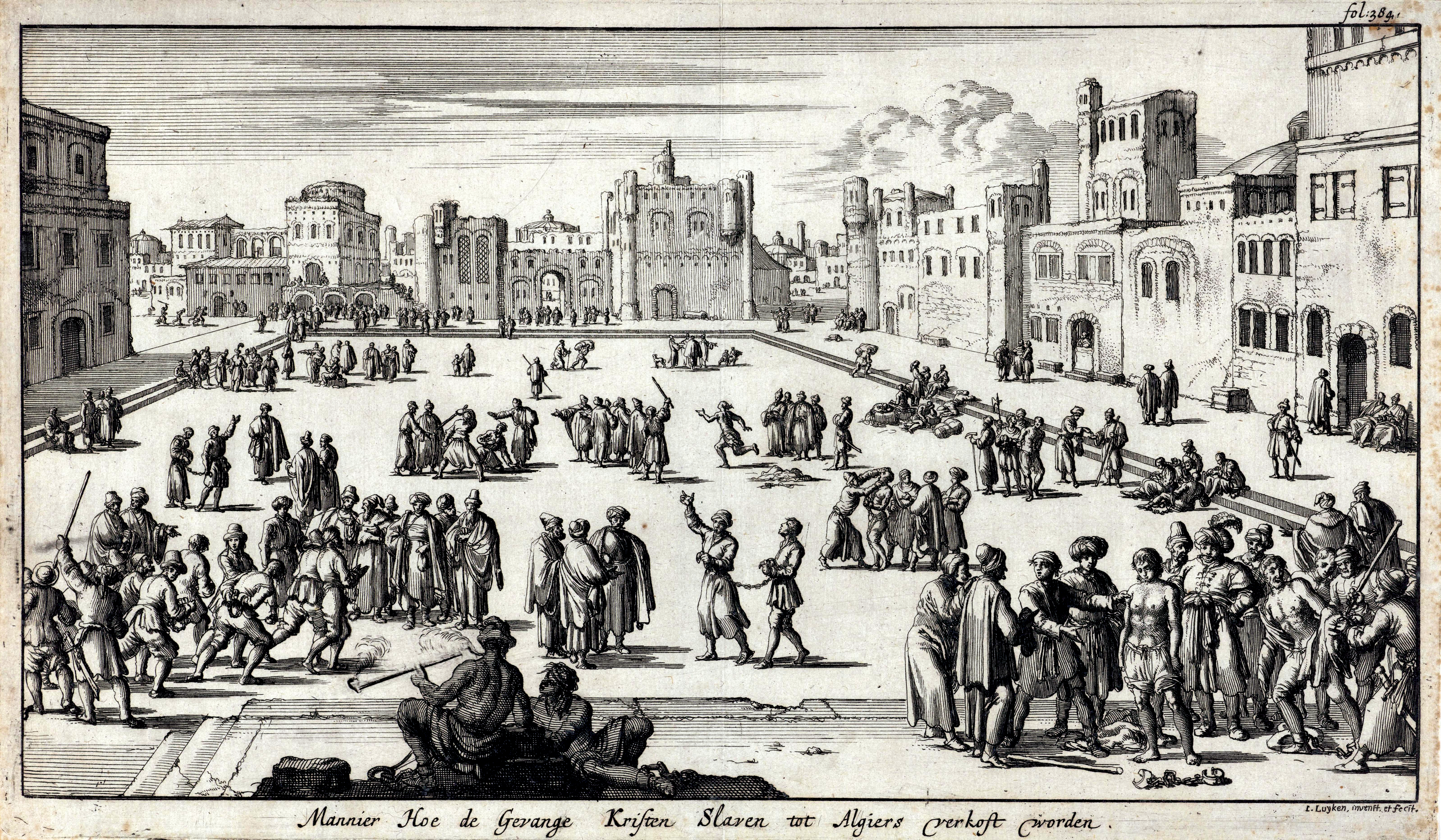
The slave market of Algiers in the early 17th century

The Barbary slave trade involved the capture of an estimated 1.25 million Europeans and selling them at slave markets in the largely independent Ottoman Barbary states of North Africa during the early modern period. European civilians were captured by Barbary corsairs in slave raids on ships and by raids on coastal towns from Italy to Ireland, coasts of Spain and Portugal, as far north as Iceland and into the Eastern Mediterranean.

The Ottoman Eastern Mediterranean was the scene of intense piracy. As late as the 18th century, piracy continued to be a "consistent threat to maritime traffic in the Aegean".

The Barbary slave trade came to an end in the early years of the 19th century. Frustrated at the continuing costs of tribute and ransom payments, the United States and Western European allies won the First and Second Barbary Wars against the pirates, but this did not end the practice. In 1816, Britain pressured the Beylik of Tunis and the Regency of Tripoli to agree to cease the enslaving of European Christians. When it became clear that the Deylik of Algiers would not comply, a British-Dutch fleet responded by decimating the Algerian navy at Algiers. A definitive end did not come until the 1830s, when the region was conquered by France.

Most of the captives were seamen and crews who were taken with their ships, but there were also many fishermen and coastal villagers who were captured. The majority of these captives were people from countries around the Mediterranean, especially Italy.

== Extent ==
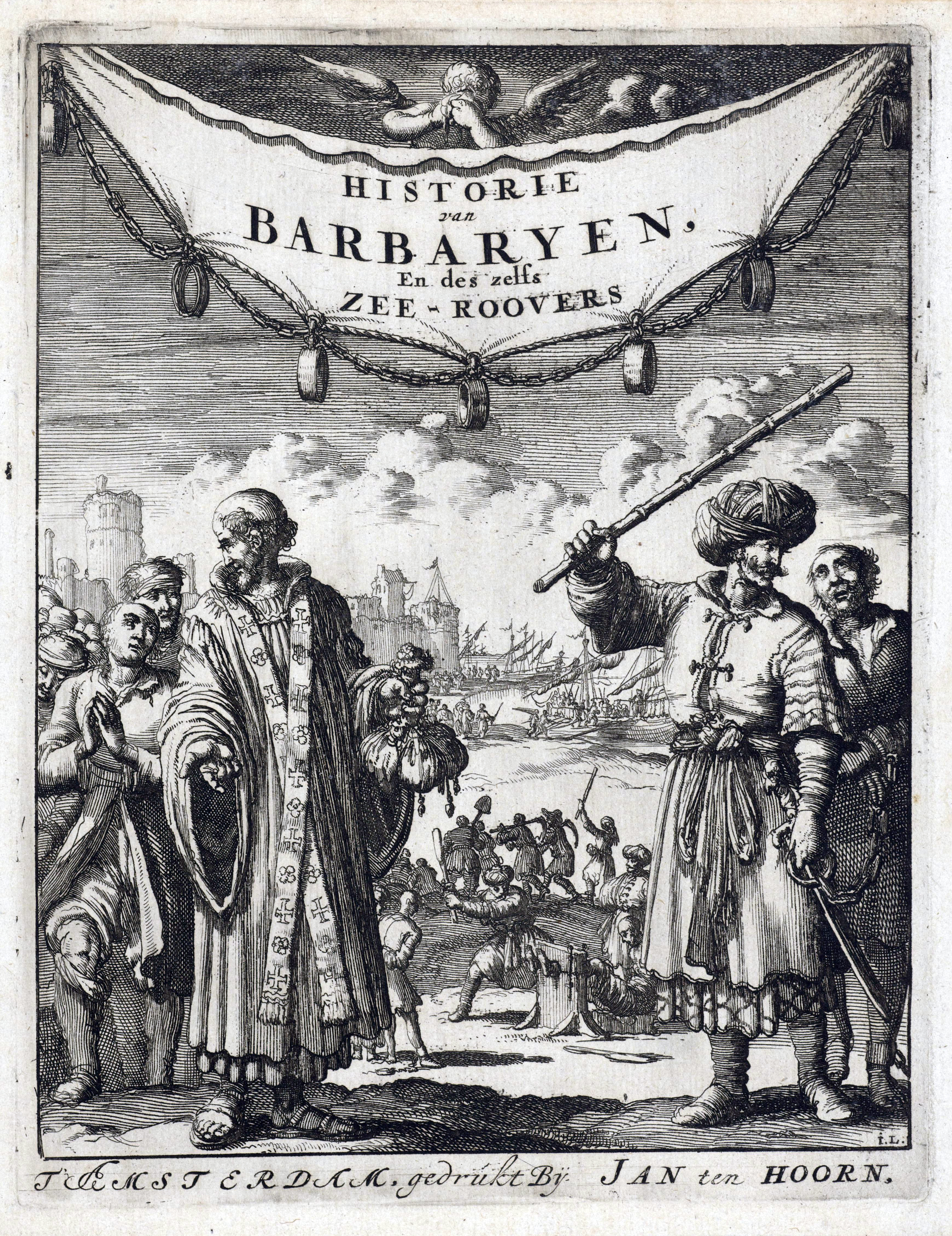
Turk and clergyman with Christian slaves. Jan Luyken, 1684.

The authorities of Ottoman and pre-Ottoman times kept no relevant official records, but observers estimated that around 35,000 European slaves were held throughout the 17th century on the Barbary Coast, across Tripoli and Tunis, but mostly in Algiers. The majority were sailors (particularly those who were English), taken with their ships, but others were fishermen and coastal villagers. However, most of these captives were people from lands close to North Africa, particularly Italy.

Robert Davis, author of Christian Slaves, Muslim Masters, estimates that slave traders from Tunis, Algiers, and Tripoli transported 1 million to 1.25 million enslaved Europeans to North Africa, from the beginning of the 16th century to the middle of the 18th century. To extrapolate his numbers, Davis assumes the number of European slaves captured by Barbary pirates remained roughly constant for a 250-year period.

Peter Earle, author of The Corsairs of Malta and Barbary and The Pirate Wars, said that Davis may have erred in extrapolating from 1580 to 1680, because that was the most intense slaving period: "His figures sound a bit dodgy and I think he may be exaggerating."

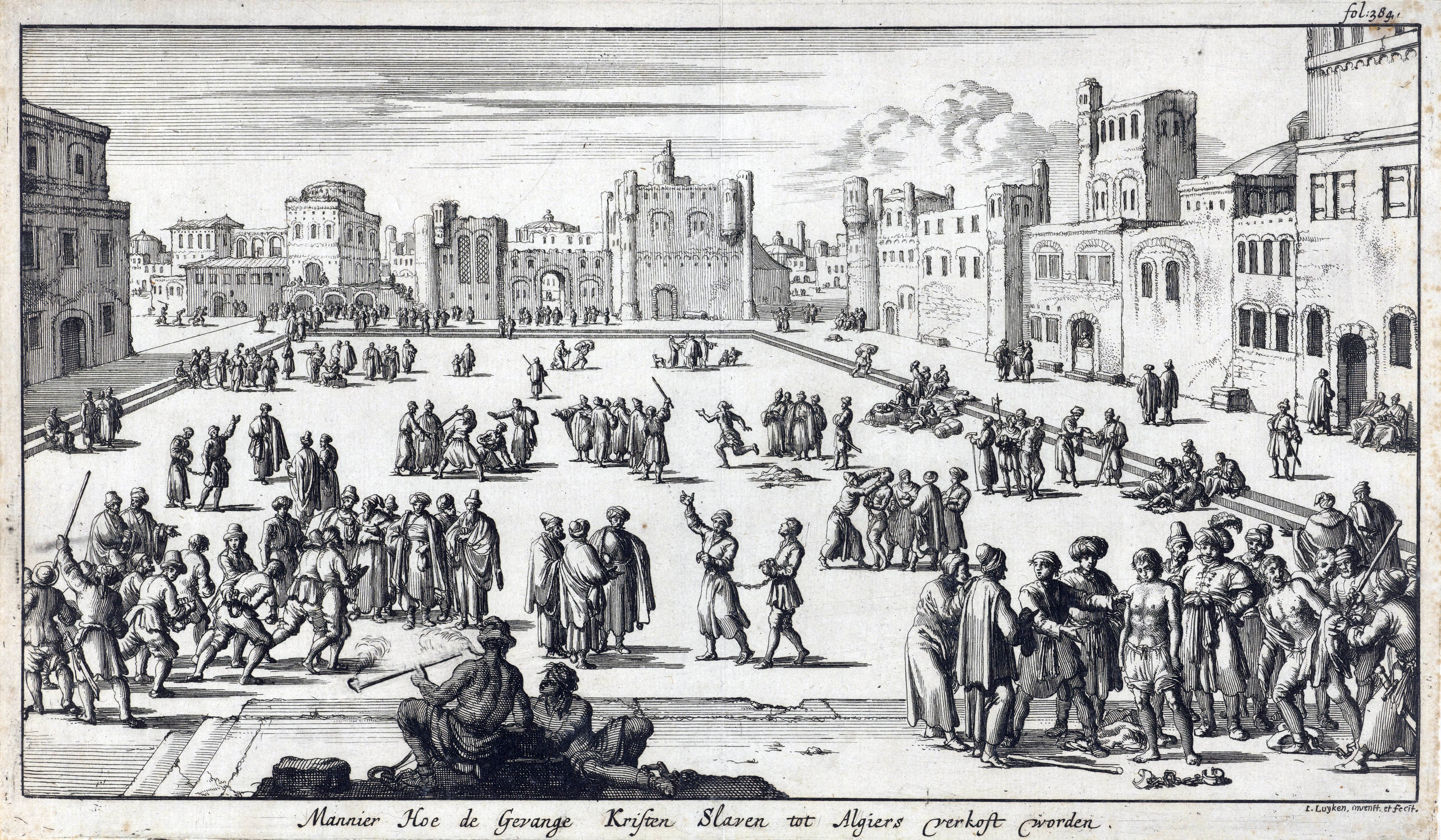
Christian prisoners are sold as slaves in a square in Algiers. Jan Luyken, 1684.

John Wright cautions that modern estimates are based on back-calculations from human observation. A second book by Davis, Holy War and Human Bondage: Tales of Christian-Muslim Slavery in the Early-Modern Mediterranean, widened its focus to related slavery.

From bases on the Barbary Coast, in North Africa, the Barbary pirates raided ships traveling through the Mediterranean and along the northern and western coasts of Africa, plundering their cargo and enslaving the people they captured. From at least 1500, the pirates also conducted raids on seaside towns and villages of Italy, Spain, Greece, Ireland, and as far away as Iceland, capturing men, women and children. In 1544, Hayreddin Barbarossa captured the island of Ischia, taking 4,000 prisoners, and enslaved some 2,000–7,000 inhabitants of Lipari. In 1551, Ottoman corsair Dragut enslaved the entire population of the Maltese island of Gozo, between 5,000 and 6,000, sending them to Ottoman Tripolitania. In 1554 corsairs under Dragut sacked Vieste, beheaded 5,000 of its inhabitants, and abducted another 6,000. The Balearic Islands were invaded by the Ottomans in 1558, and 4,000 people were taken into slavery. In 1618 the Algerian pirates attacked the Canary Islands, taking 1,000 captives to be sold as slaves. On some occasions, settlements such as Baltimore in Ireland were abandoned following a raid, only being resettled many years later. Between 1609 and 1616, England alone lost 466 merchant ships to Barbary pirates.

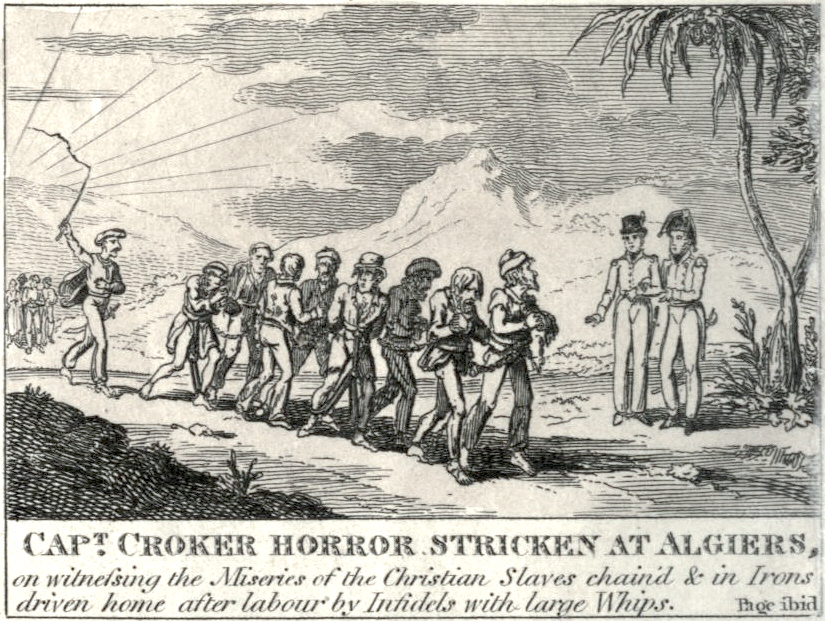
1816 illustration of Christian slaves in Algiers

While Barbary corsairs looted the cargo of ships they captured, their primary goal was to capture non-Muslim people for sale as slaves or for ransom. Those who had family or friends who might ransom them were held captive; the most famous of these was the author Miguel de Cervantes, who was held for almost five years – from 1575 to 1580. Others were sold into various types of servitude. Captives who converted to Islam were generally freed, since enslavement of Muslims was prohibited; but this meant that they could never return to their native countries.

Customs' statistics from the 16th and 17th century suggest that Constantinople's additional slave imports from the Black Sea slave trade may have totaled around 2.5 million from 1450 to 1700. The markets declined after Sweden and the United States defeated the Barbary States in the Barbary Wars (1800–1815). A US Navy expedition under Commodore Edward Preble engaged gunboats and fortifications in Tripoli in 1804.

A British diplomatic mission to Algiers led to the Dey agreeing to release some Sardinian slaves. However, the moment the British left, the Dey ordered the Sardinians massacred. The same British fleet, joined by some Dutch warships, returned and delivered a nine-hour bombardment of Algiers in 1816, leading to the Dey accepting a new agreement in which he promised to end his slavery operations. Despite this, the trade continued, ending only after the French conquest of Algeria (1830–1847). The Sultanate of Morocco had already suppressed piracy by then.

== Origins ==
North African piracy had very ancient origins. It gained a political significance during the 16th century, mainly through Hayreddin Barbarossa, who united Algeria and Tunisia as military states under the Ottoman Empire and maintained his revenues by piracy. With the arrival of powerful Moorish bands in Rabat and Tétouan (1609), Morocco became a new center for the pirates and for the ʿAlawī sultans, who quickly gained control of the two republics and encouraged piracy as a valuable source of revenue. During the 17th century, the Algerian and Tunisian pirates joined forces, and by 1650 more than 30,000 of their captives were imprisoned in Algiers alone.

The towns on the North African coast were recorded in Roman times for their slave markets, and this trend continued into the medieval age. The Barbary Coast increased in influence in the 15th century, when the Ottoman Empire took over as rulers of the area. Coupled with this was an influx of Sephardi Jews and Moorish refugees, newly expelled from Spain after the Reconquista.

With Ottoman protection and a host of destitute immigrants, the coastline soon became reputed for piracy. Crews from the seized ships were either enslaved or ransomed. Between 1580 and 1680, there were in Barbary around 15,000 renegades, Christian Europeans who converted to Islam. Half of the corsair captains were in fact renegades. Some of them were slaves who converted to Islam, but most had probably never been slaves and had come to North Africa looking for opportunity.

Robert C. Davis argues that the Barbary slave trade carried a religious dimension beyond profit-seeking. He links its origins to 1492, when the fall of Granada led to the expulsion of Muslims from Spain and describes the raids on Christian shipping as motivated in part by a desire for retribution as well as for the Crusades that preceded it. Davis characterizes the broader conflict as a mutual, centuries-long jihad, also noting that Christian military orders framed their own galley raids against Muslim shipping in comparable religious terms.

== Rise of the Barbary pirates ==
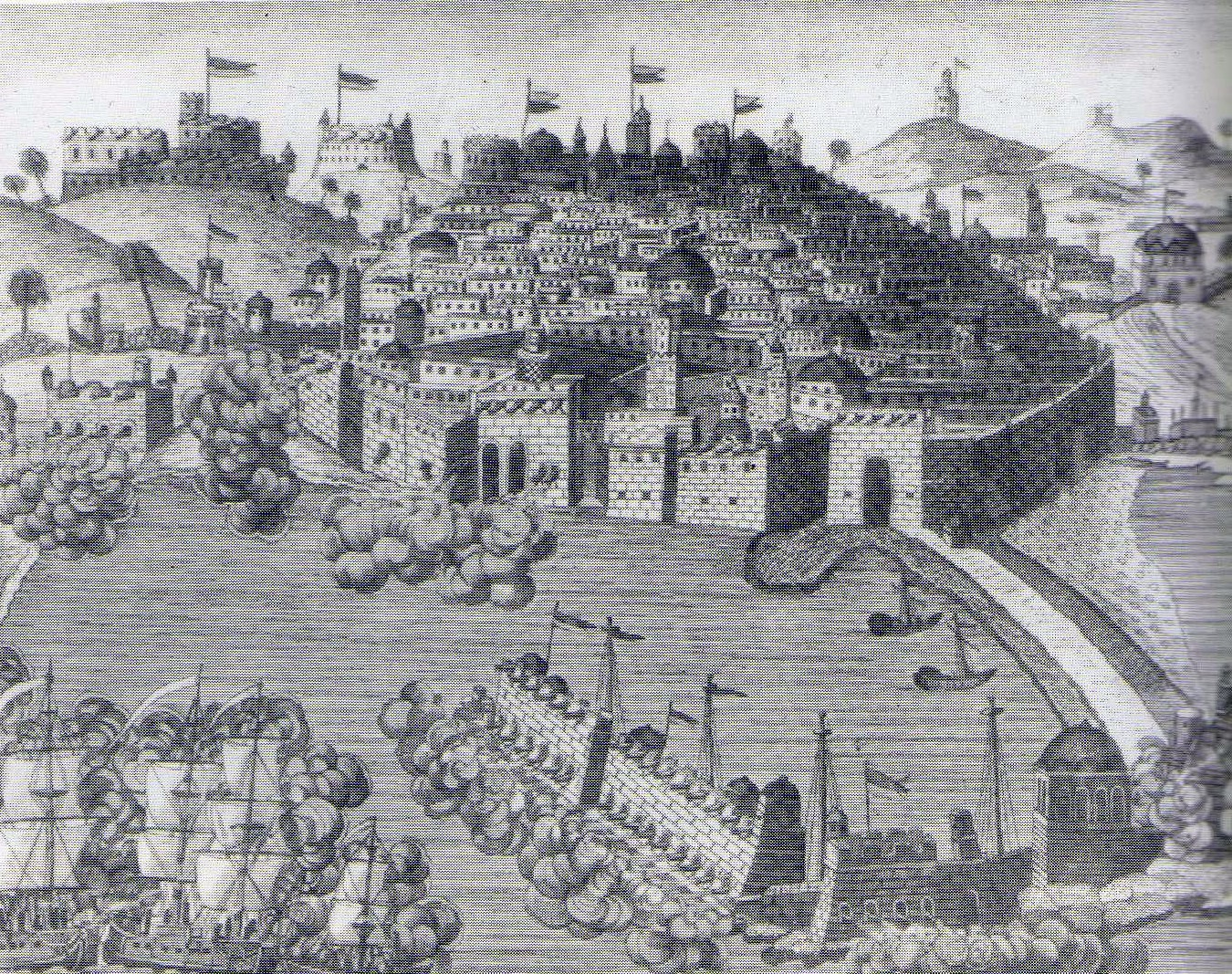
The bombardment of Algiers in 1682, by Abraham Duquesne

After a revolt in the mid-17th century reduced the ruling Ottoman Pashas to little more than figureheads in the region, the towns of Tripoli, Algiers, Tunis, and others became independent in all but name. Without a large central authority and its laws, the pirates themselves started to gain much influence.

Pirate raids for the acquisition of slaves occurred in towns and villages on the African Atlantic seaboard, as well as in Europe. From around 1500, the pirates also conducted raids on seaside towns and villages of Italy, Spain, Greece, Ireland, and as far away as Iceland, capturing men, women and children, and these raids lasted as late as the early 19th century. Robert Davis estimated that between 1 and 1.25 million Europeans were captured by pirates and sold as slaves in Tunis, Algiers and Tripoli during this time period. The slave trade in Europeans in other parts of the Mediterranean is not included in this estimation. However, other historians such as David Earle have questioned Robert Davis' estimates: “His figures sound a bit dodgy and I think he may be exaggerating.”

Famous accounts of Barbary slave raids include a mention in the diary of Samuel Pepys and a raid on the coastal village of Baltimore, Ireland, during which pirates left with the entire populace of the settlement. The attack was led by a Dutch captain, Jan Janszoon van Haarlem, also known as Murad Reis the Younger. Janszoon also led the 1627 raid on Iceland. About 50 people were killed and close to 400 captured and sold into slavery. Such raids in the Mediterranean were so frequent and devastating that the coastline between Venice and Málaga suffered widespread depopulation, and settlement there was discouraged. In fact, it was said that "there was no one left to capture any longer."

In 1627, a group known as the Salé Rovers, from the Republic of Salé (now Salé in Morocco) occupied Lundy for five years. These Barbary pirates, under the command of Janszoon, flew an Ottoman flag over the island. Slaving raids were made embarking from Lundy by the Barbary Pirates, and captured Europeans were held on Lundy before being sent to Algiers to be sold as slaves.

The power and influence of these pirates during this time was such that nations including the United States paid tribute to stave off their attacks.

An account of the later phase of the trade was published in 1740 by Englishman Thomas Pellow, who had escaped from Morocco after 21 years of slavery, having been captured from a ship in 1716 as an 11-year-old boy.

== Slave sources by nation ==
Between the 16th century and the early 19th century, the Barbary slave trade in South and West Europe was one of two major slave routes for European slaves to the Ottoman Empire and the Middle East, the other being the contemporary Crimean slave trade in Eastern Europe.

The Barbary corsairs attacked a number of different nations in Southern and Western Europe, as well as the Americas. Some of the nations were exclusively attacked by sea, while others were also subjected to slave raids on land. Each nation had their own policy in order to address the issue, and different European governments maintained negotiations with the Barbary states in order to pay ransom for captives, prevent attacks on their ships or raids on their coasts. Armed raids began in the sixteenth century, when the Ottoman states of what is today, Algeria, Tunisia and Libya became de facto independent rogue states that lived on pillage, and persisted as late as the early nineteenth century, when France conquered modern Algeria. From the 16th to the end of the 18th century, the coastal areas of Italy (especially in the south-west) were raided by pirates launched from the coast of North Africa. To protect themselves, people in coastal areas moved inland into mountainous and rugged areas. The long-term impact of these pirate attacks persisted well into the 20th century.

=== Britain and Ireland ===
Britain and Ireland were attacked by the Barbary Corsairs pirates primarily at sea but also by raids on land. The Irish Sea was infamous for being frequented by Barbary pirates, although the vast majority captives from the British Isles were sailors and crews of ships around the Mediterranean.

In 1620–1621, the government of James VI and I maintained long negotiations to prevent attacks, but did not succeed.

In the 1620s and 1640s, the coasts of Cornwall and Devon in England, as well as Southern Ireland, were subjected to raids by Barbary corsairs, who raided the coasts after having attacked ships outside of the coasts. In 1625 Barbary corsairs raided Mount's Bay enslaving 60 people the next year they raided St Keverne multiple times the ports of Looe, Penzance, Mousehole and other Cornish ports were blocked by the Corsairs.

Perhaps the most historically famous of the British and Irish slave raids was the sack of Baltimore by corsairs from Algiers against the coastal village of Baltimore in West Cork in Ireland on 20 June 1631, which was the largest slave raid by Barbary slave traders on Ireland. A couple of years after the sack of Baltimore of 1631, the Irish village of Dungarvan was also attacked by a slave raid resulting in around fifty captives. They also raided Penzance in July 1640.

England assigned agents to North Africa to buy back English citizens, who were being held as slaves. In December 1640, the situation was so serious that a government committee, the Committee for Algiers, was formed to buy back English slaves from Algeria. In 1643, so many sailors from Britain had been taken as slaves to Algeria that the English government called for a national collection of ransom money from all the churches in the kingdom to make it possible to buy them free. To buy female slaves free was much more expensive than buying back male slaves.

The Raid on Fowey took place sometime in 1645, when Barbary Corsairs from Algiers attacked the coast of Cornwall near the town of Fowey enslaving 240 people. Most of those captured were women.

Among the British victims of the Barbary slave trade were Helen Gloag, Lalla Balqis, Elizabeth Marsh and Thomas Pellow, all of whom were captured from ships.

In 1646, Algiers and the English signed a treaty sending Edmund Cason to Algiers to retrieve English slaves who numbered about 2,555 captives in Algiers in March 1641.

The greatest part of the inhabitants had rather keep their slaves than permit them to be freed: they come to so much more per head than I expected, the reason is here be many women and children which cost £50 per head and might sell them for an £100. Besides them there are divers which are masters of ships and carpenters, caulkers, coopers, sailmakers, chirurgions and others which are here highly esteemed so that they do come £32 per man.

— Edmund Cason,

Edmund Cason reportedly freed 250 English captives before running out of money. He also had to pay Pashas, Ottoman officials, and translators. Edmund would spend the remaining 8 years of his life trying to get the funds to free another 400 English captives but failed dying in Algiers.

=== Denmark–Norway ===
Denmark–Norway was attacked by the Barbary corsairs both on sea and by slave raids.

The Faroe Islands, which belonged to Norway at the time, were subjected to repeated slave raids by the Barbary corsairs in the 16th and 18th centuries. In 1607, the Faroe Islands were raided by the Barbary corsairs who abducted many people to slavery.

The most famous slave raid on the Faroe Islands was the slave raid of Suðuroy in the summer of 1629, in which thirty people were abducted to slavery, from which they never returned.

The Danish–Algerian War from 1769 to 1772 between Denmark–Norway and the Deylik of Algiers took place partially because of the Barbary piracy against Danish-Norwegian ships, whose crews were sold into slavery.

Among the Danish victims of the Barbary slave trade was Hark Olufs.

=== France ===
The Franco-Ottoman alliance, which lasted between 1536 and 1798, placed France in a different position than other European nations in the context. The Franco-Ottoman alliance formally protected France more than other nations from attacks of the corsairs, who formally were Ottoman subjects. In contrast to other European nations France could complain over the corsairs to the Ottoman sultan, who would be obligated to take action because of the Franco-Ottoman alliance. The Ottoman sultan did not support Ottoman attacks on French ships or raids of French coasts, and in contrast to the attacks on many other nations, the attacks on French ships and coasts were formally considered illegal also by the Ottomans.

In practice however the corsair states of North Africa were Ottoman in name only and did not necessarily respect the obligations of the Ottoman sultan, who had weak control over the provinces, and France was subjected to their attacks despite the Franco-Ottoman alliance.

During the 1550s, the French provinces of Provence and Languedoc were devastated by slave razzias by the corsairs, which resulted in French complaints to the Ottoman sultan, and the city of Marseille petitioned regent Catherine de' Medici as well as taking separate measures to liberate enslaved natives and protect their commerce vessels, and reported to have lost twelve galleons aside from a large number of smaller boats. In 1555, Turgut Reis sailed to Corsica and ransacked Bastia, taking 6,000 prisoners.

Sultan Suleiman I ordered the corsairs to leave French vessels alone in 1565, out of respect for the alliance. However, such orders from the Ottoman sultans only placed a slight inhibition on the corsairs in regard to France, rather than to protect them fully. There were several slave raids toward France, such as for example in Northern France close to Calais in 1620.

Among the French victims of the Barbary slave trade was Antoine Quartier.

=== Iceland ===
Iceland was subjected to several slave raids by the corsairs. In 1607, Iceland was raided by the corsairs who abducted many people to slavery.

The most famous slave raid on Iceland was the Turkish Abductions that took place in the summer of 1627. About 400 people were captured and sold into slavery, of whom only 50 individuals returned from slavery by ransom, 9 to 18 years later.

Among the Icelandic victims of the Barbary slave trade was Ólafur Egilsson.

=== Italy ===
Italy was, along with Spain, one of the most seriously affected countries in the context of Barbary corsair slave raids. Aside from attacks on Italian ships, many slave raids were conducted toward Italian coasts by the corsairs during the 16th and 17th centuries.

Italy, which after the 1550s was dominated by the Ottoman arch enemy the Habsburgs, was quite vulnerable to slave raids, because it was politically fragmented, its coasts lacked fortifications, and its territorial defense forces were weak and dispersed, and the corsair slave raiding along Italian coasts developed in to a full scale industry. As in Spain, the slave raids resulted in the abandonment of coasts and islands, and they were described as "the wretched beaches, the abandoned islands, the fishermen in flight, and the [slaving ships].... loitering past on the sea".

One of the most famous of the slave raids against Italy was the attack by the fleet of Hayreddin Barbarossa on several towns in Southern Italy between July and August 1534, which resulted in devastation, economical losses and thousands of people murdered and enslaved. The contemporary author Gregorio Rosso described the devastating slave raid upon Southern Italy in the summer of 1534:

"In late July he [Barbarossa] passed the lighthouse of Messina, where he burnt some ships, and his rearguard fought with some galleys of Antonio d'Ora, who was in that place. Then they sacked Santo Lucito in Calabria, leaving not a soul alive. After that, close to Citraro, Land of the Benedictine Monks of Montecassino, and as the Citizens fled, he burnt that with seven half-completed galleys, half that were in the Court's service there. From there they went to Pisciotta and on 7 of August passing in sight of Naples with more fear than harm to the City, left men on dry land on the Island of Procita and sacked that Land; not content with this, he attacked Sperlonga without warning, where they say more than a thousand people were made slaves: and finally he sent people to Fondi to seize Donna Giulia Gonzaga to present her to the Great Turk, who desired her for the great fame of her beauty. Fondi was sacked, and Donna Giulia scarcely had time to save herself that night on a horse in her nightgown, just as she was."

The aftermath of the slave raids described "two thousand dead and taken in the pillage" and how it would be necessary with tax exemption for the surviving population for Fondi and Sperlonga in December 1534; how especially women had been targeted for slavery in Sperlonga, were 162 houses had been destroyed; that 1,213 houses in Fondi had been broken in to and valuables of 26,000 ducats had been stolen in that town alone, and that 73 men, women and children had been killed and 150 enslaved from Fondi.

In 1544, Hayreddin Barbarossa captured Ischia, taking 4,000 prisoners in the process, and deported to slavery some 9,000 inhabitants of Lipari, almost the entire population. When pirates sacked Vieste in southern Italy in 1554 they took an estimated 7,000 slaves.

The slave raids continued during the 17th century. In 1638, the coastal lands of Calabria was devastated by the corsair slave raids.

Rich Italian families often attempted to buy back their captured relatives, and the Senate of the Republic of Venice often made efforts to buy back captured noblemen. During such negotiations, Italian or Jewish merchants were often used as the intermediaries.

The slave raids in Spain and Italy damaged the population and in consequence the economy in the entire Mediterranean.

Among the Italian victims of the Barbary slave trade were Marthe Franceschini and Felice Caronni.

=== Malta ===
Malta was subjected to slave raids by the Barbary corsairs. In 1551, Turgut Reis and Sinan Pasha raided the islands of Malta and Gozo, and the entire population of Gozo was abducted and sold into slavery in Libya.

=== Netherlands ===
No slave raids were performed against the coasts of the Netherlands. Dutch ships were however a frequent target for corsair pirates. The Dutch government regularly assigned agents to buy back Dutch citizens captured and enslaved in North Africa. Dutch slaves were reportedly among the highest priced, and the corsairs demanded higher prices from them than for many other Europeans.

=== Portugal ===
The territories of Portugal were also subjected to coastal raids by the Barbary pirates.

In 1617, the Barbary Corsairs from Algeria conducted the sack of Madeira, during which they attacked the Portuguese island and abducted 1,200 of its inhabitants as slaves. The attack occurred during the height of slavery on the Barbary coast. Madeira was at that time a part of the Iberian Union headed by the Monarchy of Spain.

=== Spain ===
Spain was one of the worst affected areas in all Europe to attacks by the corsairs. Both Spanish ships as well as coasts were subjected to attacks by the corsairs from the early 16th century onward.

The corsairs of Tunis mainly raided the sea and coasts of Italy and Greece, while the Corsairs of Algiers and Morocco frequented the waters and coasts of Spain and Western Europe.

The slave raids on Spain started in the early 16th century onward. The sack of Cullera in Spain on the Mediterranean Sea, occurred on 20 May 1550, when the Ottoman general Dragut landed in Cullera, Valencia and sacked the city taking away many inhabitants in slavery. Dragut attacked Cullera at night with 300 men. Dragut sacked the city, seized goods from the people and took almost all of the inhabitants of the city as slaves. He kept the captives in a cave before taking them to a slave market in Algiers. In 1558 Barbary corsairs captured the town of Ciutadella, destroyed it, slaughtered the inhabitants, and carried off 3,000 survivors to Istanbul as slaves. In 1563 Turgut Reis landed at the shores of the province of Granada, and captured the coastal settlements in the area like Almuñécar, along with 4,000 prisoners. Barbary pirates frequently attacked the Balearic islands, resulting in many coastal watchtowers and fortified churches being erected. The threat was so severe that Formentera became uninhabited.

The slave raids grew particularly severe during the 17th century, when the corsairs abducted the population of entire villages along the Mediterranean coast of Spain, leaving large coastal areas depopulated. In 1637 for example, 315 women and children were captured from the town of Calpe. When the coastal villages depopulated, the Spanish crown was forced to raise the taxes of fish, meat, cattle and silk to finance the construction of fortresses to protect the coast and prevent people from leaving the areas for safer settlements in the interior of the country.

Spanish ships were affected as well. In 1667, so many seamen had been abducted from the Basque provinces that those provinces could no longer fill the quotas of seamen to the Spanish marines.

The slave raids in Spain and Italy damaged the population and in consequence the economy in the entire Mediterranean.

=== Sweden and Finland ===
No slave raids were ever conducted by corsairs towards the coasts of Sweden and Finland (which was a part of Sweden). However, Swedish and Finnish ships were attacked by corsairs in the sea outside of Western Europe and in the Mediterranean.

On 20 November 1662, the Lord High Treasurer of Sweden, Magnus Gabriel De la Gardie received a letter of appeal from eight Swedish sailors who had been abducted by corsairs at sea and were being held in slavery in Algiers.

The Swede Johan Gabriel Sparfwenfeldt, who visited Algiers and Tunis in 1691, described empathically how he had met and spoken to many Swedish slaves who asked him for help to be bought free and return to "their homes, to their children, their parents and the land of their home", and listed 23 names of the Swedes then held as slaves.

Sweden attempted to protect their ships by use of insurance against slavery, convoys, international treaties, and by maintaining friendly contact with the corsairs. The captives were also bought free by their relatives. This did not only apply to slaves from rich families: many poor women are known to have collected money to buy their husbands and sons free. When the young sailor Erik Persson Ångerman was enslaved in Algiers after having taken captured from the ship Wibus from Stockholm on 10 May 1725, he sent a letter to his wife Maria Olssdotter via his colleague Petter Wallberg (who had been bought free and was returning to Sweden) and told her he "sat in hard slavery" in Algiers. Maria Olssdotter had no funds to buy his freedom, but appealed to the king via the governor of Gävle for money to be gathered in the churches for the purchase of her enslaved husband, and her application was approved; this was not an unusual case, as many poor women are known to have done the same.

Almost all Swedes and Finns who were captured by the corsairs at sea were sailors. Between about 500 and 1000 Swedish citizens were enslaved by the corsairs between 1650 and 1763.

One of the Swedish victims of the Barbary slave trade was Marcus Berg (1714–1761).

=== British North America and United States ===
There were no Barbary land raids in British North America and the later United States. However, the Barbary pirates attacked American ships, took American captives and sold them as slaves. Already in 1661, a chronicler wrote "for a long time previous the commerce of Massachusetts was annoyed by Barbary corsairs and that many of its seamen were held in bondage."

During the American Revolutionary War, the pirates attacked American ships. On December 20, 1777, Morocco's sultan Mohammed III declared that merchant ships of the new American nation would be under the protection of the sultanate and could thus enjoy safe passage into the Mediterranean and along the coast. The Moroccan-American Treaty of Friendship stands as America's oldest unbroken friendship treaty with a foreign power. In 1787, Morocco became one of the first nations to recognize the United States of America.

Starting in the 1780s, realizing that American vessels were no longer under the protection of the British navy, the Barbary pirates had started seizing American ships in the Mediterranean. As the United States had disbanded its Continental Navy and had no seagoing military force, its government agreed in 1786 to pay tribute to stop the attacks. On March 20, 1794, at the urging of President George Washington, Congress voted to authorize the building of six heavy frigates and establish the United States Navy, in order to stop these attacks and demands for more and more money.

The United States had signed treaties with all of the Barbary states after its independence was recognized between 1786 and 1794 to pay tribute in exchange for leaving American merchantmen alone, and by 1797, the United States had paid out $1.25 million or a fifth of the government's annual budget then in tribute.

The Barbary attacks on American ships were a contributing cause of the Americans participating in the Barbary Wars.

== Barbary wars ==
Commercial ships from the United States of America were subject to pirate attacks. In 1783, the United States made peace with, and gained recognition from, the British monarchy. In 1784, the first American ship was seized by pirates from Morocco. By late 1793, a dozen American ships had been captured, goods stripped, and all passengers and crew enslaved. In response, the US created the United States Navy in March 1794.

This new military presence helped stiffen American resolve to resist the continuation of tribute payments, leading to the two Barbary Wars along the North African coast: the First Barbary War from 1801 to 1805 and the Second Barbary War in 1815. Payments of ransom and tribute to the Barbary states were 20% of United States government annual revenues in 1800. It was not until 1815 that naval victories ended tribute payments by the United States. Some European nations continued annual payments until the 1830s. The white slave trade and slave markets in the Mediterranean gradually declined and eventually disappeared after European occupations.

== Decline ==
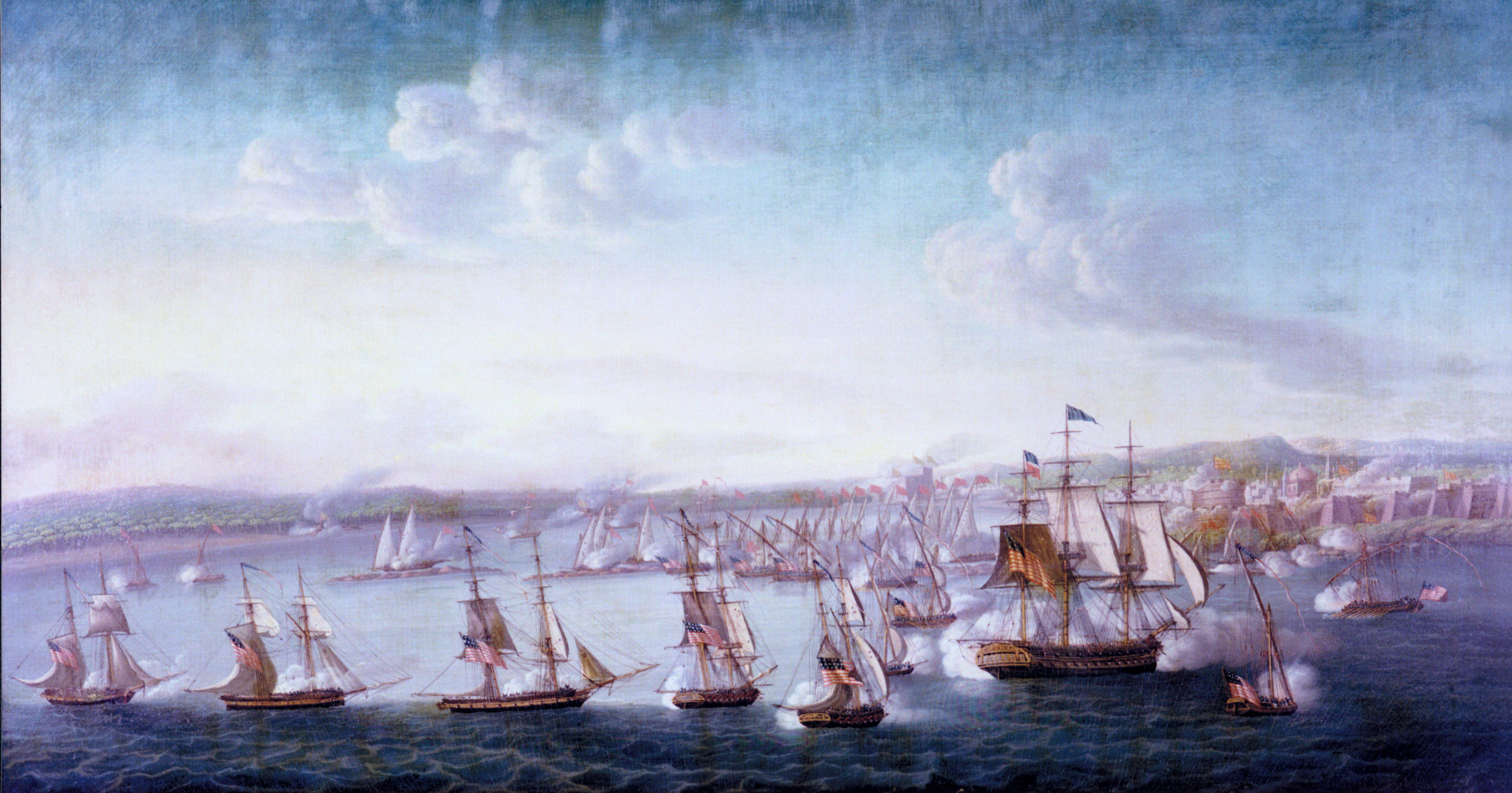
A US Navy expedition under Commodore Edward Preble engaging gunboats and fortifications in Tripoli, 1804

In the first years of the 19th century, the United States, allied with European nations, fought and won the First and the Second Barbary Wars against the pirates. The wars were a direct response of the American, British, French and the Dutch states to the raids and the slave trade by the Barbary pirates against them, which ended in the 1830s, when the region was conquered by France. The Barbary slave trade and slave markets in the Mediterranean declined and eventually disappeared after the European occupations.

After an Anglo-Dutch bombardment in 1816 of Algiers on 27 August, led by Admiral Edward Pellew, 1st Viscount Exmouth, disabled most of the pirate fleet, the Dey of Algiers was forced to agree to terms which included the release of the surviving 1,200 slaves (mostly from Sardinia) and the cessation of their practice of enslaving Europeans. After being defeated in this period of formal hostilities with European and American powers, the Barbary states went into decline.

The Barbary pirates refused to cease their slaving operations, resulting in another bombardment by a Royal Navy fleet against Algiers in 1824. France invaded Algiers in 1830, placing it under colonial rule. Tunis was similarly invaded by France in 1881. Tripoli returned to direct Ottoman control in 1835, before falling into Italian hands in the 1911 Italo-Turkish War. The slave traders thus found that they had to work in accordance with the laws of their governors, and could no longer look to self-regulation. The slave trade ceased on the Barbary Coast in the 19th and 20th centuries or when European governments passed laws granting emancipation to slaves.

== Slave narratives ==
In comparison to North American and Caribbean slave narratives, the North African slave narratives in English were written by British and American white slaves captured (at sea or by Barbary pirates) and enslaved in North Africa in the 18th and early 19th centuries. They are distinct in that they highlight the non-Christian aspect of Muslim slave traders.

Narratives that focused on the central themes of freedom and liberty drew inspiration from the American Revolution. Since surviving narratives include recurrences of certain themes and quote each other, some scholars believe that accounts were derivative of prior narratives.

Examples include:

- Horrors of slavery: or, The American tars in Tripoli, by Ray William, 1808
- Sumner, Sumner (1853). White Slavery in the Barbary States: A lecture before the Mercantile Library Association (Boston, Massachusetts). Cleveland: John P. Jewett & Co. OCLC 7391019248.
- A True and Faithful Account of the Religion and Manners of the Mahometans by Joseph Pitts (1663–1735) Pitts was captured as a boy aged 14 by Barbary pirates off the coast of Spain. His sale as a slave and his life under three different masters in North Africa, and his travels to Mecca are described.
- Tyrkja-Gudda, Símonardóttir was abducted from her home in Iceland by Barbary pirates in 1627
- Thomas Pellow, The History of the Long Captivity and Adventures of Thomas Pellow, In South Barbary, 1740
- A Journal of the Captivity and Suffering of John Foss; Several Years a Prisoner in Algiers, 1798
- History of the Captivity and Sufferings of Mrs Maria Martin who was six years a slave in Algiers 1812
- Captain James Riley, Sufferings in Africa, 1815
- The Narrative of Robert Adams, An American Sailor who was wrecked on the West Coast of Africa in the year 1810 and was detained three years in slavery by the Arabs of the great desert, 1817
- James Leander Cathcart, The Captives, Eleven Years a Prisoner in Algiers, published in 1899, years after his captivity in Ottoman Algeria

== See also ==
- Barbary corsairs
- Barbary Wars
- Jan Janszoon
- North African slave narratives
- Republic of Salé
- Sklavenkasse
- Slavery in the Ottoman Empire
- Turkish Abductions

== Bibliography ==
- Claudio, Vicki, ed. (2012). A Pastoral Letter to the Captives. Exagorazo Press. ISBN 978-1441417930.
