= Felice Caronni =

Italian memoir writer, numismatist and archeologist (1747–1815)

Reverend Felice Caronni CRSP
- Born: November 8, 1747; Monza, Duchy of Milan
- Died: 10 April 1815 (aged 67); Milan, Kingdom of Lombardy–Venetia
- Occupations: Catholic priest; Numismatist; Archaeologist
- Known for: being the first to locate the precise site of the ancient Carthage Punic Ports

Academic background
- Influences: Joseph Hilarius Eckhel; Jean Emile Humbert

Academic work
- Discipline: Ancient Greek and Roman numismatics, Near Eastern Archaeology

Felice Caronni CRSP (8 November 1747 – 10 April 1815) was an Italian memoir writer, numismatist and archeologist.

He fell victim to the Barbary slave trade after having been abducted by the barbary corsairs in 1804. After having returned to Italy, he wrote a memoir of his experience as a slave, which is one of the latest slave narratives of the barbary slave trade. Any profits from the book were to go towards ransoming Christian slaves in Tunisia.

== Life and work ==
Felice Caronni was born in Monza on 8 November 1747 into a family of wealthy merchants. After completing his studies in the Milan Seminary, he was ordained a priest in Lodi on 19 October 1770. He taught the Humanities at the college of San Giovanni alla Vigne of Lodi until 1771, when he was transferred to Arpino to teach Rhetoric at the local college.

In the autumn of 1773 he spent a long period in Rome, where he befriended Giovanni Battista Visconti, a disciple of Winckelmann who had become curator of the Museo Pio-Clementino. He became friends with Visconti's sons, Ennio Quirino, Filippo Aurelio and Alessandro. Visconti encouraged Caronni to pursue the study of archaeology.

In October 1773 he was transferred to Livorno. He gave an account of his travel in a letter to Visconti, in which he describes the ancient works of art he had seen in the Grand Ducal Gallery in Florence.

In 1775 he was transferred to Genoa, where he continued his teaching activity and devoted himself to the study of archaeology and in particular numismatics.

In 1780 Caronni was transferred again to Rome where he resumed contact with Visconti and furthered his archaeological studies, but due to health problems he was transferred to Bormio in 1782.

In 1786 he was transferred to Mantua, where he began a correspondence with the prominent archaeologist Angelo Maria Cortenovis.

From 1789 to 1790 he traveled through Europe: he visited Augsburg, Munich, Vienna, Bohemia, Saxony, Hungary and Prussia.

Back in Hungary he settled for three years in Hédervár, in the palace of Count Mihály Viczay, with whom he had previously become friends and whose coin collection he reorganized. On behalf of Viczay he toured Europe in search of antiquities: he visited Budapest, Vienna, Frankfurt and Pressburg. In Vienna he befriended the keeper of the imperial cabinet of coins Joseph Hilarius Eckhel.

In 1791 he visited Paris, Amsterdam and London; where he purchased ancient medals and coins on behalf of Viczay. That same year he returned to Hédervár, where he catalogued and organized the new items he had purchased.

In 1793, at the end of this assignment in Hungary, Caronni went back to Monza, where he continued to search for ancient coins.

From 1797 he lived in Milan. Politically conservative, he opposed the French Revolution and the establishment of the Cisalpine Republic.

In 1804, he travelled through Italy: he visited Rome, Naples and Palermo. In June, while travelling from Palermo to Naples, the ship on which he was sailing was attacked by Barbary corsairs and taken to Tunis, where he remained until the end of September. Caronni was freed at the beginning of 1805 thanks to the efforts of his superiors, the French government and the vice-president of the Italian Republic, Francesco Melzi d'Eril.

He took the opportunity to visit the remnants of ancient Carthage. For three weeks he toured the ruins of the ancient city under the expert guidance of the Dutch soldier and archaeologist Jean Emile Humbert.

He returned to Italy through Livorno, where he had to remain in quarantine until February 1805. Caronni occupied this period by starting to write a memoir of his experience, published in Milan in 1805. The following year the second part of his memoir was published, with the description of the monuments he had seen during his stay in Tunisia. The work contained the first published topography of ancient Carthage and located for the first time the precise site of key topographical sites, such as Byrsa and the Punic Ports. As a result, his text became a major reference work about Tunis in the early 19th century.

In the spring of 1806 he went to Vienna and in June he returned to Hédervár, where he continued the arrangement of Viczay's numismatic collection.

In 1808 he published Lezioni elementari di numismatica antica an Italian translation of Eckhel's Kurtzgefasste Anfangsgründe dedicated to the general of the order, the future cardinal Francesco Fontana. That same year he published a compendium of Eckhel's Manuale doctrinae numorum veterum.

In 1808 he was invited to Hungary by the Primate Karl Ambrosius of Austria-Este who entrusted him with the task of reorganising his collection of antiquities. Here he visited the mines of Transylvania. He gave an account of these visits in another volume printed in Milan in 1812, dedicated to Count Michele Esterházy.

In 1811 he moved to Vienna, where he published the catalogue of the Viczay collection. He returned in Milan after the end of the French occupation, shortly before his death, in mid-April 1815.

== Works ==
- Ragguaglio del viaggio compendioso di un dilettante antiquario, sorpreso da' corsari, condotto in Barberia e felicemente ripatriato. Milan: Sonzogno. 1805.
- Ragguaglio di alcuni monumenti di antichità ed arti raccolti negli ultimi viaggi da un dilettante. Milan: Sonzogno. 1806.
- Eckhel, Joseph Hilarius (1808). Lezioni elementari di numismatica antica. Translated by Felice Caronni. Rome: Stamperia Pagliarini.
- Manuale doctrinae numorum veterum a celeberr. Eckhelio editae ... in compendium redactae. Rome: apud Franciscum Bourliè. 1808.
- Caronni in Dacia: Mie osservazioni locali, nazionali, antiquarie sui Valacchi ... Milan: G. Pirotta. 1812.
- Musei Hedervarii in Hungaria numos antiquos M. A. Wiczay. 2 vols. Vienna: Typis patrum Mechitaristarum. 1814.
- Salvatore Bono, ed. (1993). Ragguaglio del viaggio in Barberia. Milan: Edizioni San Paolo. ISBN 978-8821526947.

== Bibliography ==
- Cagni, Giuseppe Maria (1996). "Una vita avventurosa: il P. Felice Caronni (1747-1815)". Barnabiti Studi. 13: 239–341.
- Debergh, Jacques, "L'aurore de l'archéologie à Carthage au temps d'Hamouda bey et de Mahmoud bey (1782-1824): Frank, Humbert, Caronni, Gierlew, Borgia", in Geografi, viaggiatori, militari nel Magbreb: alle origini dell'archeologia del Nord Africa (Africa romana. XIII convegno internazionale di studi, Djerba, 10-13 dicembre 1998), Rome, 2000, pp. 457–74.
- Vittorini, Valerio (2011). "Le port de Carthage dans l'Itinéraire de Chateaubriand et dans le Ragguaglio de Caronni". Loxias. 34.
- Vittorini, Valerio (2023). "Felice Caronni". In David Thomas; John Chesworth (eds.). Christian-Muslim Relations. A Bibliographical History. Vol. 21. South-western Europe (1800-1914). Leuven: Brill. pp. 577–8. ISBN 978-90-04-54756-8.
