= Andreas Matthäus Wolfgang =

German engraver and memoirist (1660–1736)

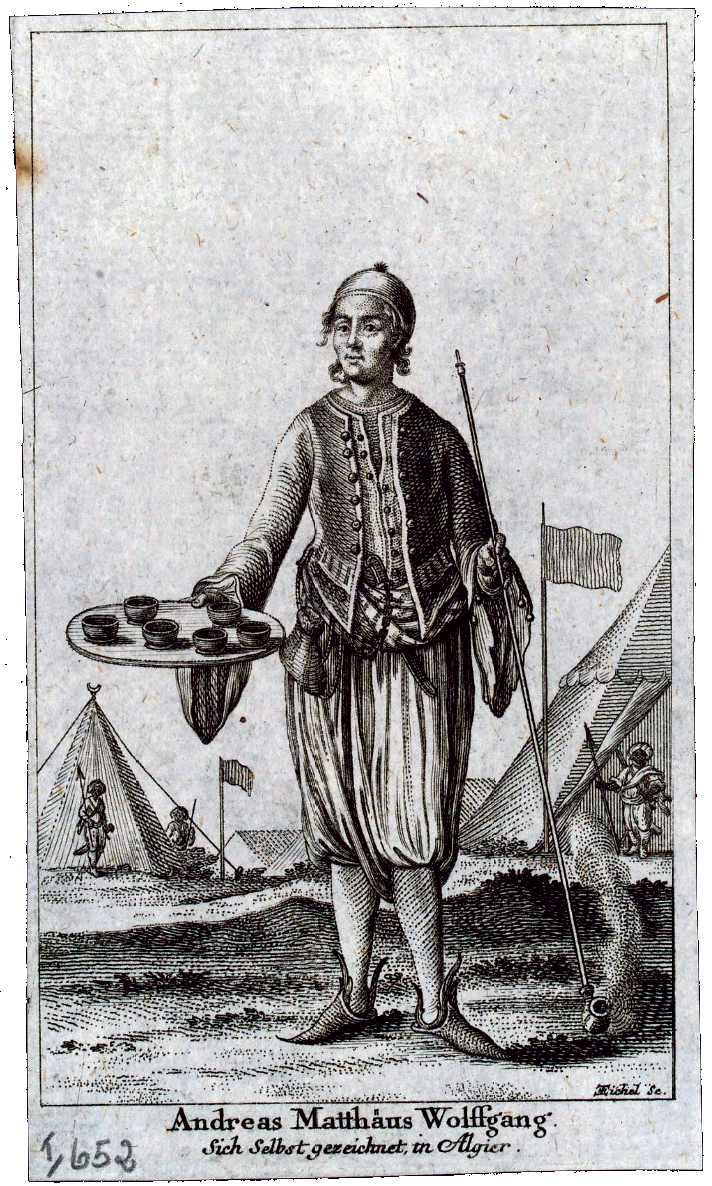
Self-portrait of Andreas Matthäus Wolffgang in Algiers in Landestracht.png

Andreas Matthäus Wolfgang (1660–1736) was a German memoir writer and engraver.

He was the son of the German-English engraver Georg Andreas Wolfgang the Elder from Augsburg and brother of the engraver Johann Georg Wolffgang.

He and his brother fell victim to the Barbary slave trade after having been abducted by the barbary corsairs on their way to Germany after having been educated by their father and sold in Alger, where they spent several years as a slave in 1684–1691. After having returned to Germany, they wrote a memoir of his experience as a slave.
