= Angelucci =

Angelucci can be:

- Orfeo Angelucci, mid-1950s contactee who claimed to be in contact with extraterrestrials
- Gilberto Angelucci, a retired Venezuelan football goalkeeper
- Jonathan Angelucci, an Australian football (soccer) player
- Liborio Angelucci (1746–1811), an Italian physician and politician
- Marc Angelucci (1968–2020), an American attorney and murder victim
