= Isaac Brassard =

French memoir writer (1620–1702)

Isaac Brassard (1620–1702) was a French memoir writer.

He fell victim to the Barbary slave trade after having been abducted by the barbary corsairs and sold in Alger, where he spent several years as a slave.

After having returned to France, he wrote a memoir of his experience as a slave.
