= Consul =

Magistrate or title in various republics and city-states

Consul (abbrev. cos.; Latin plural consules) was the title of one of the two chief magistrates of the Roman Republic, and subsequently also an important title under the Roman Empire. The title was used in other European city-states through antiquity and the Middle Ages, in particular in the Republics of Genoa and Pisa, then revived in modern states, notably in the French First Republic. The related adjective is consular, from the Latin consularis. In modern terminology, a consul is a type of diplomat.

== Roman consul ==
A consul held the highest elected political office of the Roman Republic (509 to 27 BC), and ancient Romans considered the consulship the highest level of the cursus honorum (an ascending sequence of public offices to which politicians aspired). Consuls were elected to office and held power for one year. There were always two consuls in power at any time.

== Other uses in antiquity ==
=== Private sphere ===
It was not uncommon for an organization under Roman private law to copy the terminology of state and city institutions for its own statutory agents. The founding statute, or contract, of such an organisation was called a lex, 'law'. The people elected each year were patricians, members of the upper class.

=== City-states ===
While many cities, including the Gallic states and the Carthaginian Republic, were similarly led by double-headed chief magistracies, they commonly used different titles, such as the Punic sufet, Duumvir, or Meddix, i.e., analogues to Consul in languages native to these city-states' locations.

== Medieval city-states, communes and municipalities ==
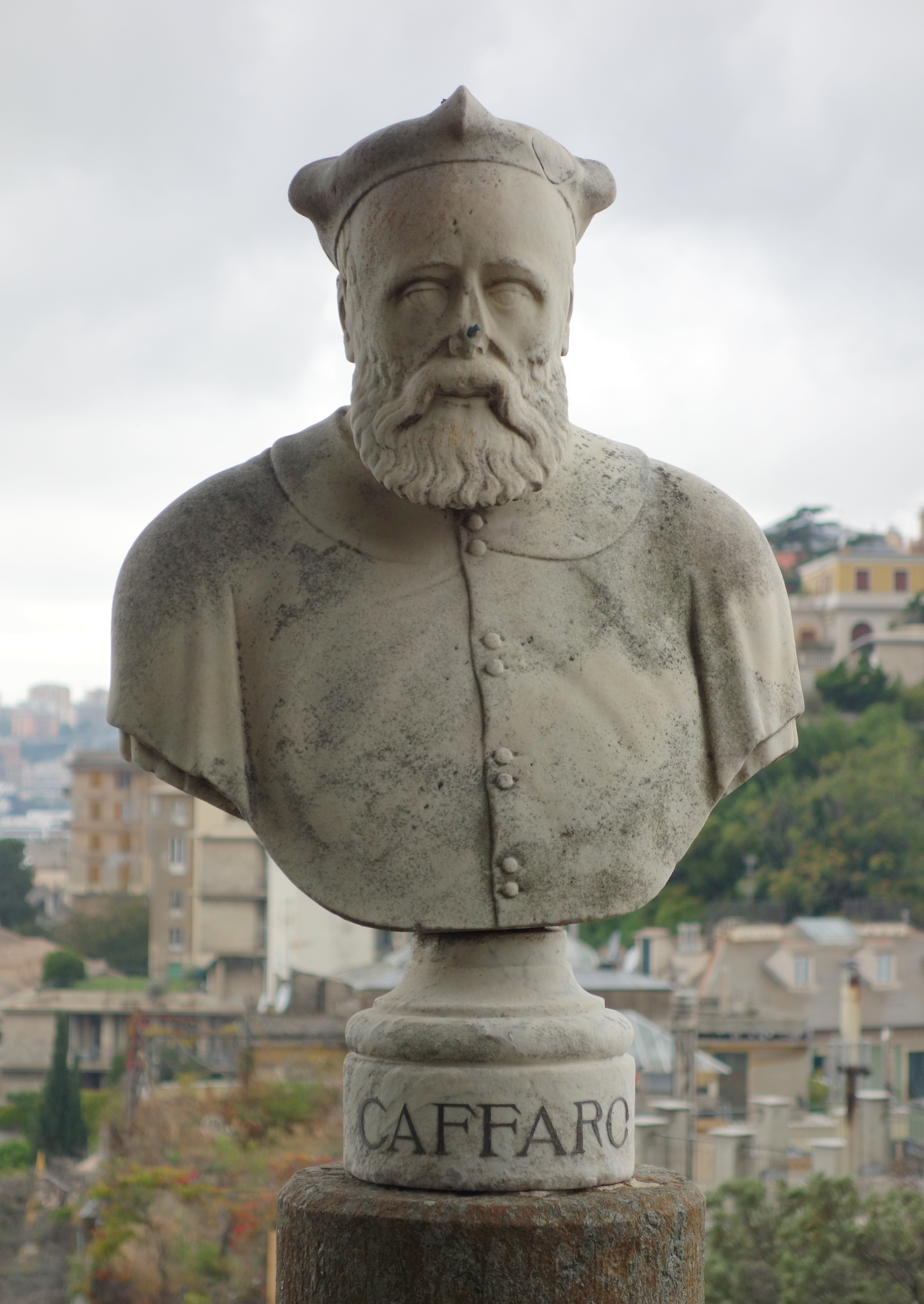
Caffaro di Rustico da Caschifellone, statesman of the Genoese Republic in the 12th century, for which he served eight terms as a consul.

=== Republic of Genoa ===
The city-state of Genoa, unlike ancient Rome, bestowed the title of consul on various state officials, not necessarily restricted to the highest. Among these were Genoese officials stationed in various Mediterranean ports, whose role included helping Genoese merchants and sailors in difficulties with the local authorities. Great Britain reciprocated by appointing consuls to Genoa from 1722. This institution, with its name, was later emulated by other powers and is reflected in the modern usage of the word (see Consul (representative)).

=== Republic of Pisa ===
In addition to the Genoese Republic, the Republic of Pisa also took the form of "Consul" in the early stages of its government. The Consulate of the Republic of Pisa was the major government institution present in Pisa from 1087 to 1189. Despite losing space within the government since 1190 in favor of the Podestà, for some periods of the 13th century some citizens were again elected as consuls.

=== Other uses in the Medieval period ===
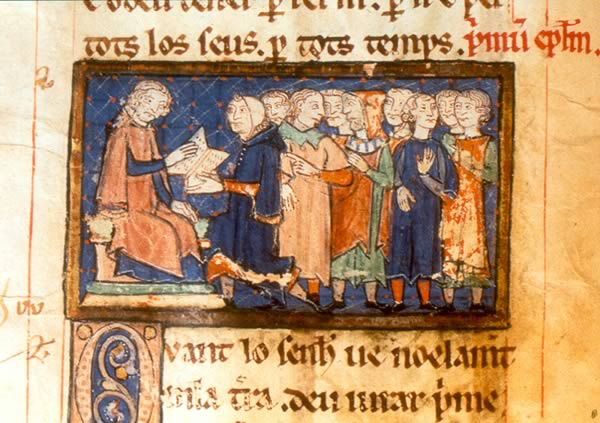
In this painting, Alphonse, Count of Poitiers and Count of Toulouse takes an oath before the Consuls of the town of Agen, with his right hand on the town ordinances, committing himself to recognize the autonomy of the town's commune, while sitting on a pedestal. The consul administering the oath is forced to go on his knees, symbolizing Alphonse's lordship and the town's loyalty.

Throughout most of southern France, a consul (French: consul or consule) was an office equivalent to the échevins of the north and roughly similar to English aldermen. The most prominent were those of Bordeaux and Toulouse, which came to be known as jurats and capitouls, respectively. The capitouls of Toulouse were granted transmittable nobility. In many other smaller towns the first consul was the equivalent of a mayor today, assisted by a variable number of secondary consuls and jurats. His main task was to levy and collect tax.

The Dukes of Gaeta often used also the title of "consul" in its Greek form "Hypatos" (see List of Hypati and Dukes of Gaeta).

== French Revolution ==
=== French Republic 1799–1804 ===
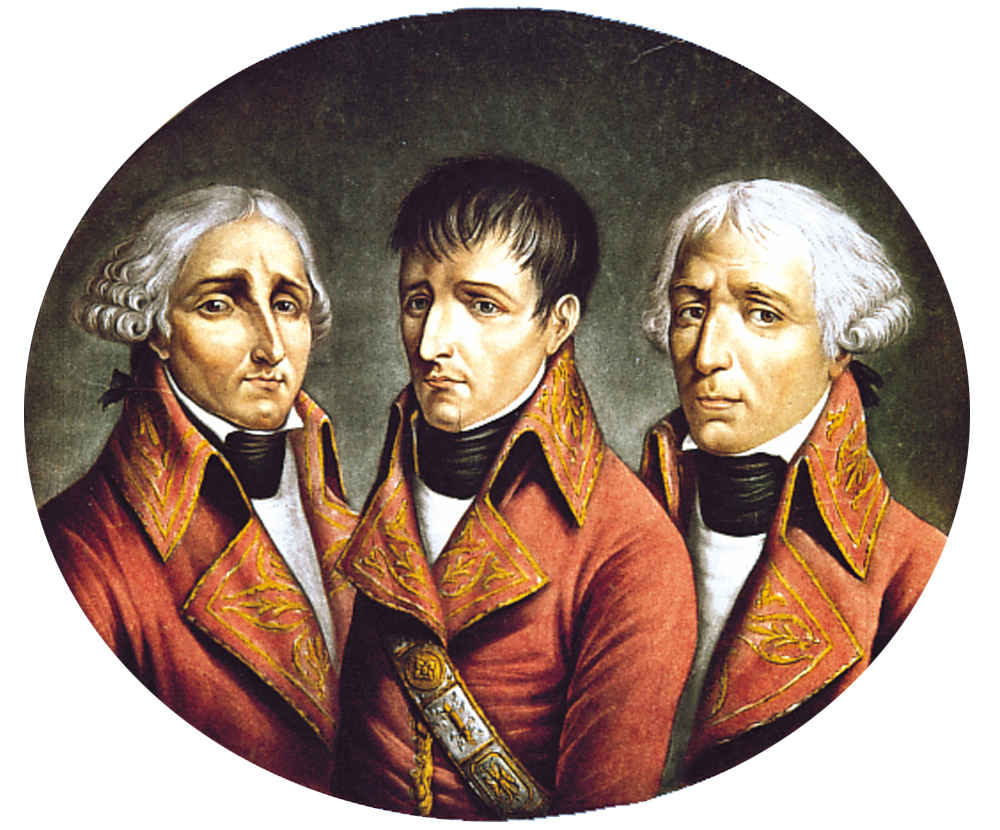
A portrait of the three consuls, Jean-Jacques-Régis de Cambacérès, Napoleon Bonaparte and Charles-François Lebrun (left to right)

After Napoleon Bonaparte staged a coup against the Directory government in November 1799, the French Republic adopted a constitution which conferred executive powers upon three consuls, elected for a period of ten years. In reality, the first consul, Bonaparte, dominated his two colleagues and held supreme power, soon making himself consul for life (1802) and eventually, in 1804, emperor.

The office was held by:

- Napoleon Bonaparte, Emmanuel-Joseph Sieyès, Roger Ducos, provisional consuls (10 November – 12 December 1799)
- Napoleon Bonaparte (first consul), Jean-Jacques Cambacérès (second consul), Charles-François Lebrun (third consul), consuls (12 December 1799 – 18 May 1804)

=== Bolognese Republic, 1796 ===
The short-lived Bolognese Republic, proclaimed in 1796 as a French client republic in the Central Italian city of Bologna, had a government consisting of nine consuls and its head of state was the Presidente del Magistrato, i.e., chief magistrate, a presiding office held for four months by one of the consuls.

=== Roman Republic, 1798–1800 ===
The French-sponsored Roman Republic (15 February 1798 – 23 June 1800) was headed by multiple consuls:

- Francesco Riganti, Carlo Luigi Costantini, Duke Bonelli-Crescenzi, Antonio Bassi, Gioacchino Pessuti, Angelo Stampa, Domenico Maggi, provisional consuls (15 February – 20 March 1798)
- Liborio Angelucci, Giacomo De Mattheis, Panazzi, Reppi, Ennio Quirino Visconti, consuls (20 March – September 1798)
- Brigi, Calisti, Francesco Pierelli, Giuseppe Rey, Federico Maria Domenico Michele, Zaccaleoni, consuls (September – 24 July 1799)

Consular rule was interrupted by the Neapolitan occupation (27 November – 12 December 1798), which installed a Provisional Government:

- Prince Giambattista Borghese, Prince Paolo-Maria Aldobrandini, Prince Gibrielli, Marchese Camillo Massimo, Giovanni Ricci (29 November 1798 - 12 December 1798)

Rome was occupied by France (11 July – 28 September 1799) and again by Naples (30 September 1799 – 23 June 1800), bringing an end to the Roman Republic.

== Revolutionary Greece, 1821 ==
Among the many petty local republics that were formed during the first year of the Greek Revolution, prior to the creation of a unified Provisional Government at the First National Assembly at Epidaurus, were:

- The Consulate of Argos (from 26 May 1821, under the Senate of the Peloponnese) had a single head of state, styled consul, 28 March 1821 – 26 May 1821: Stamatellos Antonopoulos
- The Consulate of East Greece (Livadeia) (from 15 November 1821, under the Areopagus of East Greece) was headed 1 April 1821 – 15 November 1821 by three consuls: Lambros Nakos, Ioannis Logothetis & Ioannis Filon

Note: in Greek, the term for "consul" is "hypatos" (ὕπατος), which translates as "supreme one", and hence does not necessarily imply a joint office.

== Paraguay, 1813–1844 ==
In between a series of juntas and various other short-lived regimes, the young republic was governed by "consuls of the republic", with two consuls alternating in power every 4 months:

- 12 October 1813 – 12 February 1814, José Gaspar Rodríguez de Francia y Velasco
- 12 February 1814 – 12 June 1814, Fulgencio Yegros y Franco de Torres
- 12 June 1814 – 3 October 1814, José Gaspar Rodríguez de Francia y Velasco; he stayed on as "supreme dictator" 3 October 1814 – 20 September 1840 (from 6 June 1816 styled "perpetual supreme dictator")

After a few presidents of the Provisional Junta, there were again consuls of the republic, 14 March 1841 – 13 March 1844 (ruling jointly, but occasionally styled "first consul", "second consul"): Carlos Antonio López Ynsfrán (b. 1792 – d. 1862) + Mariano Roque Alonzo Romero (d. 1853) (the lasts of the aforementioned juntistas, Commandant-General of the Army) Thereafter all republican rulers were styled "president".

== Modern uses of the term ==
In modern terminology, a consul is a type of diplomat. The American Heritage Dictionary defines consul as "an official appointed by a government to reside in a foreign country and represent its interests there." The Devil's Dictionary defines Consul as "in American politics, a person who having failed to secure an office from the people is given one by the Administration on condition that he leave the country".

In most governments, the consul is the head of the consular section of an embassy, and is responsible for all consular services such as immigrant and non-immigrant visas, passports, and citizen services for expatriates living or traveling in the host country.

A less common modern usage is when the consul of one country takes a governing role in the host country.

== See also ==
Differently named, but same function

- Captain Regent (similar modern position in San Marino's government)
- Consularis (Roman gubernatorial style)

Modern UN System

- Consulate

== Sources and references ==
- WorldStatesmen.org, see each present country

Specific
