= Antoine Qaurtier =

French memoir writer

Antoine Quartier (1632–1702) was a French memoirist, who wrote about his experiences being enslaved in Tripoli. His memoir was published as L'Esclave religieux et ses avantures.

He fell victim to the Barbary slave trade after having been abducted by the barbary corsairs and sold in Libya, where he lived as a slave between 1660 and 1668. After having returned to France, he wrote a memoir of his experience as a slave, which is a rare description of slavery in Libya, most barbary slave narratives depicting slavery in Alger and Morocco.

Joined the Paris Congregation of the Order of Mercy in 1671. He was ordained priest after September 1676.
