= Christian Slaves, Muslim Masters =

2003 book by Robert C. Davis

Christian Slaves, Muslim Masters: White Slavery in the Mediterranean, the Barbary Coast, and Italy, 1500–1800
- Author: Robert C. Davis
- Language: English
- Publisher: Palgrave Macmillan
- Publication date: 2003
- ISBN: 0-333-71966-2 (first edition)
- Dewey Decimal: 306.3620945
- LC Class: HT1342 .D38

Christian Slaves, Muslim Masters: White Slavery in the Mediterranean, the Barbary Coast, and Italy, 1500–1800 is a 2003 book by Robert C. Davis, published by Palgrave Macmillan.

The book concerns the Barbary slave trade. According to Davis, the number of Europeans taken in by Barbary slavers exceeded 1,000,000 and was up to 1,250,000, higher than previous estimates.

== Background ==
Jarbel Rodriguez of San Francisco State University stated that, in the 2000s, much of the scholarly attention was on slavery of Sub-Saharan African groups and had not focused on slavery of other groups.

== Content ==
"White Slavery" is the title of the initial section. Davis's estimates of those enslaved are in the book's initial chapter, and the second chapter discusses how slaves were acquired. Chapter 3 and chapter 4 document the daily routine of the slaves, and are organized into the book's second part. "The Home Front", which documents attempts to liberate slaves, is the final section. Some of the book discusses complications in families from former slaves returning to their home countries.

The book does not have a list of works consulted. Ehud R. Toledano of Tel Aviv University concluded that the book consults European documents, including some found in Italian institutions, and does not consult any Ottoman documents. According to Toledano, the works consulted would be testimonies from those enslaved and narratives of travels.

== Reception ==
Rory Carroll of The Guardian wrote that historians "welcomed any attempt to fill a gap in the little-known story of Africans subjugating Europeans" but that they did not agree on the plausibility of the figures of enslaved.

Rodriguez stated that the book is "an engaging and thought-provoking book", and that it was "highly readable" and "excellent". Rodriguez argued that Davis should have distinguished between a "captive" and a "slave"; the reviewer characterized the issue as "minor".

Toledano stated that the book "is a disappointment to people interested in non-European perspectives on African and Mediterranean history" although the focus on "interesting and neglected information" that Toledano believed should go in a more comprehensive work would be a "saving grace" of the work. According to Toledano, the book did not account for Europeans who had genuine conversions to Islam, and the book should have used Ottoman documents alongside European documents for sourcing.

The New American, a publication of the John Birch Society, cited the book while arguing that reparations for slavery in the United States would be "aberrant foolishness".

Circa 2020 alt right groups called attention to the book and contacted the author, which Jeff Grabmeier of Ohio State University characterized as unusual for academic books that had been published decades prior. Some alt right groups argued that the fact that Barbary slavery occurred makes the Atlantic slave trade inconsequential or that it makes up for the Atlantic slave trade, arguments Davis rejected. Davis stated: "Two such enormous wrongs don't make anything right."

== See also ==
- Holy War and Human Bondage, another book by Davis
- Slavery on the Barbary Coast
- Slavery in the Ottoman Empire
