= Sack of Madeira =

1617 pirate attack

- Part of Barbary–Portuguese conflicts
- Location: Madeira, Portugal
- Date: 1617
- Target: Civilians of Madeira
- Attack type: Slave raid
- Victim: 1,200 enslaved
- Perpetrator: Regency of Algiers
- Assailants: 8 vessels and 800 men

The sack of Madeira occurred in 1617 when Algerian pirates known as Barbary Corsairs sacked the island of Madeira and took 1,200 inhabitants as slaves. The attack occurred during the height of slavery on the Barbary coast. Madeira was at that time a part of the Iberian Union headed by the Monarchy of Spain.

The Algerians had established a base on the islands of Cape Verde from which they operated against ships in the Atlantic.

In 1617 the Algerians arrived in Madeira with 8 vessels and 800 men. They plundered the island and enslaved 1,200 inhabitants. During the sack, the Algerians burned the island's archives and sacked much, including church bells. It is also said that they had emptied the island of Porto Santo in the Madeira archipelago, enslaving 663 inhabitants. In 1649, the French historian Pierre Dan described the 1617 invasion of Madeira:

"For having left Algiers on the fifteenth of July, with a squadron of eight well-armed vessels, they descended on the Island of Madeira, which depends on the Crown of Spain. When they approached, with eight hundred Turks whom they put to the ground, they ravaged the whole island, pillaged the ornaments and jewels of the Churches; took away the bells, and made slaves twelve hundred people, men, women, and children, whom they took to Algiers. As they were a league away, they discharged all the artillery of their ships as a sign of rejoicing; so that by this signal, those of the City, informed of their return, came to see them arrive".

== See also ==
- Turkish Abductions
