= Holy War and Human Bondage =

2009 book by Robert Davis

Holy War and Human Bondage: Tales of Christian‐Muslim Slavery in the Early‐Modern Mediterranean is a 2009 non-fiction book by Robert Davis, published by Praeger.

It discusses intra-Christian slavery and slavery of Muslims by Christians. According to Jeff Grabmeier of Ohio State University, the book received less overall attention compared to Christian Slaves, Muslim Masters.

Eric R. Dursteler of Brigham Young University stated that the work "stands on its own and presents a more expansive and comprehensive, yet accessible, synthetic treatment of" its topic. Dursteler stated that since several people taking slaves did not discriminate by religion on whether to take slaves, the "provocative" title "is a bit misleading."

== Content ==
Some chapters are longer and some are shorter, content characterized by Dursteler as "vignettes".

According to Dursteler, "there is a solidly European focus to the book", and that it is "only lightly informed by relevant Ottoman scholarship". Consequently, the amount of content related to slaves who followed Islam is less compared to the content about slaves who followed Christianity.

== Reception ==
Dursteler had an overall favorable reception and that his criticisms were "relatively minor quibbles".

Maria Fusaro of the University of Exeter, citing the one page-long "works cited", which she characterized as "exceedingly short", concluded that the book is "highly problematic". According to Fusaro, while Davis stated in the introduction that he wished to tailor his work to a non-academic audience, Davis may have been conflicted on whether to do so.
