= Thomas Pellow =

English author

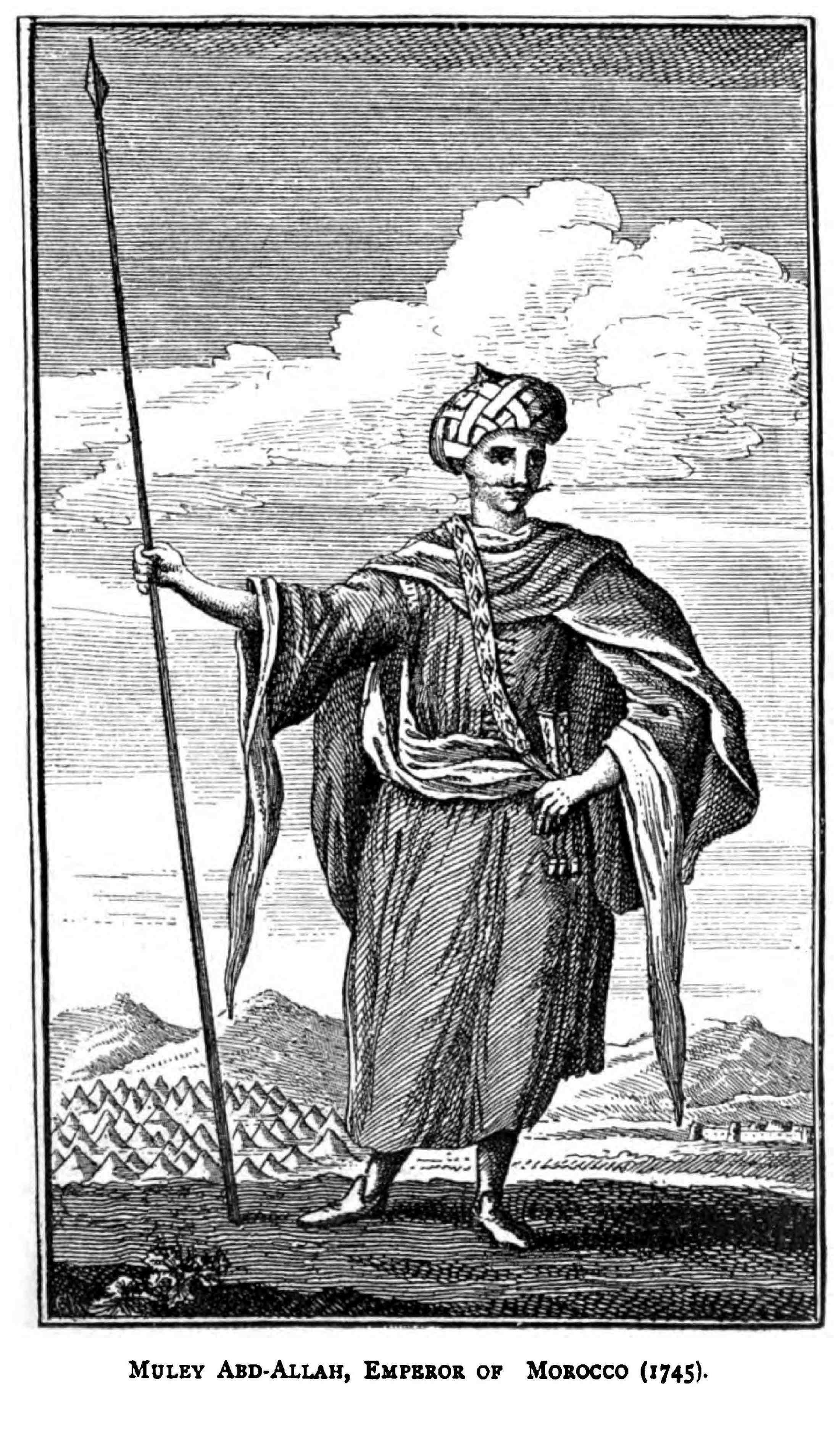
Frontispiece from Thomas Pellow's slave narrative (1890)

Thomas Pellow (1704–1745) was a Cornish author and who spent around 20 years as an enslaved person in the Sultanate of Morocco, on the Barbary Coast. He is best known for the extensive captivity narrative entitled The History of the Long Captivity and Adventures of Thomas Pellow in South-Barbary.

== Early life and education ==
Thomas Pellow was born in 1704, the son of Thomas Pellow of Penryn, Cornwall and his wife Elizabeth (née Lyttleton).

== Captivity ==
Pellow's captivity began at the age of eleven when sailing abroad in the summer of 1716 when his ship was attacked by Barbary pirates after crossing the Bay of Biscay travelling with his uncle, John Pellow, who was the ship's captain, along with five Englishmen. Pellow and his shipmates were taken captive and delivered to Sultan Moulay Ismail (aka Ismail Ibn Sharif) of Morocco as prisoners. Pellow was one of the individuals handpicked by the sultan along with three others.

Pellow, after being pulled aside by the Sultan, was led into the armoury, where he and others were tasked with cleaning the arms and cases belonging to the Sultan and his army, although he did not stay doing that for long as he was soon given by the emperor to his son, Muley Spha. Muley Spha was known as an unsavoury individual who gave his slaves futile tasks to perform, such as running morning to night after his horse's heels. When Muley Spha noticed how bright Pellow was, instead of beating him as was his custom, he tried to convince him to convert to Islam, promising him gifts and a better life as one of his esteemed friends. After Pellow had refused all of his bribes, Muley Spha became infuriated and began to torture Pellow. "[He] committed me prisoner to one of his own rooms, keeping me there several months in irons, and every day most severely bastinading me". Eventually, after weeks and weeks of horrendous torture, Pellow gave in and was forced to convert. After a time, Moulay Ismail ordered his son to bring Pellow so that he could go to school and learn the Moorish language. When Muley Spha disobeyed this order, he was summoned by the sultan, his father, and killed right in front of Pellow.

=== Life as an elite slave ===
With time, Moulay Ismail assigned Pellow into the Abid al-Bukhari ("Black Guard"). According to Pellow's text, white European converts could rise within the Moroccan military system, but were confined to their own separate fighting units. These units were generally much less important to Ismail's government and military operations than their counterparts in the ‘Abid.

Pellow's extensive slave narrative The History of the Long Captivity and Adventures of Thomas Pellow chronicles his life from his captivity as a captain's boy to his eventual military role as a preeminent captain in the Moroccan Army. Elite slaves like him played a vital role in the armed forces, often serving as soldiers and as officers, leading to the acquisition of important roles in administration, politics, and all aspects of public affairs.

Pellow was only one of many European males who were taken and placed into military slavery. Pellow was part of a "band of European slaves mixed among other races that formed an elite army corps". Pellow fought on the frontlines with ferocious proficiency, and his role in combat was primarily as an infantryman, as were most of these slave soldiers. The monarchs viewed their role in their armies as "an integral, perhaps a primary, part of the conquering Ottoman army". However, despite their value, these soldiers were regulated as servile classes and were not allowed to carry a sword or iron spear, "these being distinctions of a free man", but they did carry some kind of weapon.

Soon after Pellow's Barbary capture and conversion to Islam, Pellow was educated to speak Arabic, as well as how to perform Moroccan social customs. From roughly the age of 12, Pellow was given the responsibility of managing 80 slave boys. He excelled in his new position and eventually was transferred into the palace to work as a personal attendant for Moulay Ismail's son, Mulai Zidan. Pellow's close proximity to the monarch's family exposed him to the many forms of capricious violence the Mulai family often employed. During his time there he witnessed the murder of Zidan, his favourite black slave, for disturbing two pigeons that Zidan was observing. His role as Zidan's personal attendant was a preparatory grooming technique that tested Pellow's ability to care for the monarch. In his narrative, Pellow expresses the daily anxieties he was forced to live among, compared to how law is enforced in England.

Pellow was considered a valuable slave. He was conditioned to live in constant fear of his life being ended at a moment's notice. This mental conditioning compromised all relationships Pellow had with the Mulai family. Slavery scholar Orlando Patterson describes Pellow's anxieties about master relations as follows: "No authentic human relationship was possible where violence was the ultimate sanction. There could be no trust, no genuine sympathy; and while a kind of love may sometimes have triumphed over this perverse form of interaction, intimacy was usually calculation, and sadomasochistic".

=== Slave army ===
After being the personal slave for the Sultan's son, Pellow eventually joined the Sultan's army—an army that consisted almost entirely of slave-soldiers who had been captured as young children and indoctrinated. Pellow was made an officer in the slave army. Unlike all other military slaves, who spend their lives training for war, Pellow joined the sultan's army later in life. He led other slave-soldiers into battle and once took part in a slave-gathering expedition in sub-Saharan Africa.

There was a stark difference between the independent renegades encountered in the narrative and their slave counterparts. According to Daniel Pipes in his 1979 article "The strategic rationale for military slavery", "As the mercenaries or allies, they retained their own loyalties, but as slaves, they could be subjected to reorientation. Prior to enrollment in the army, they were prepared for service; the government secured their loyalty and fitted their military skills to the needs of the army". Unlike the free-thinking allies and mercenaries for hire, a slave's life depended on their masters. They were trained to fight and forced into combat against their will. As such, the process of making them submissive to their masters was a long and arduous one by which they were beaten into shape and into a fearful loyalty to their masters. The alien soldiers were isolated figures whose isolation and alienation caused them to adopt what they were left with as normality.

As well as being kept in poor living conditions, they were also beaten. The emperor would say that he would do these cruel acts to the slaves to see if they were hard enough, if they were prepared to fight in his army. Even after this type of treatment the soldiers were completely loyal to their emperor, who would give them such incentives as distributing money among them to make them eager to march on expeditions they were ordered on.

=== Marriage ===
Pellow, in his book, describes the collective wedding where he received his wife as a reward from Moulay Ismail, and mentions his wife's family and the status of his new brother-in-law, but he references his wife and children only a few other times in the latter portions of his narrative.

Pellow's wife and daughter both died while he was campaigning as a slave-soldier. In response to the news that his family was dead, he wrote "I thought them to be by far better off than they could have been in this troublesome World, especially this Part of it; and I was really very glad that they were delivered out of it, and therefore it gave me very little uneasiness".

== Escape and return to Penryn ==
Pellow eventually fled Morocco by boarding an Irish ship and returned home in the summer of 1738.

After his years as a slave had finally come to an end, Pellow was faced with the daunting task of finding his way home to Penryn. He managed to secure himself passage aboard a ship bound for Gibraltar, but once the ship had docked, Pellow was forbidden to go ashore. Pellow's attire, tanned skin, and thick beard, caused the harbour guards to mistake Pellow for a Moor, and initially refuse to let him disembark. Pellow called out to them to convince them he was as much a Christian man as them. The guards did not believe Pellow until his identity was at last verified, and he was able to leave the ship. While in Gibraltar, a man named Mr. Abramico threatened to take Pellow back to Barbary. Pellow then physically assaulted Mr. Abramico in the street before some of his friends convinced him to stop the attack.

A few days later he found himself a ship bound for London and managed to secure himself a ride. After a brief stint in London, Pellow made multiple trips to eventually find his way back to Penryn, in October 1738, at the age of 34.

Pellow's disorientation and feeling of apprehension carried over into his arrival at his hometown of Penryn. Even though he was happy to be back in his homeland, Pellow admitted that everything was foreign to him. He did not recognise anyone. Not even his parents, who, in turn, only recognised him because they had heard of his impending return, were recognisable. Pellow was treated as a returning hero of sorts, even given a celebration, but unfortunately the roles of his home countries had reversed. His native home had become a strange place to him and the land of his captivity had become more like home.

Pellow found himself tormented by his twenty years of fighting, and upon his return he found great difficulty in acclimatising back into English society. "Thomas Pellow had not just been captured by Barbary: he had in the process been changed. He was never able to make a satisfactory life for himself on return to Britain." Pellow's difficulty with reintegration is severely administered by his life in Barbary. Not only was he far from home, but he was indoctrinated into the Arab world and accepted his reality and their religion. Pellow's irreversible change was what made him an outsider, and made finding meaning in a place that was once his home impossible. "Pellow's inability to settle back in and make good, may have been due to more, however, than his own alienation. In his absence, not only he but his country had been transformed."

Pellow was a man with only one particular set of skills, and found himself completely lost in a place that was once his home. The world at home was not the place he had once become accustomed to; instead, it was a place that he felt distant from, and felt unable to relate to the people at home. Even when he spotted his cousin after his escape, he chose to avoid him because he felt so distant due to his many years away from his people and his blood. "I looked sharp out for a vessel, but could not find anyone to my Mind; not but here were two, and one belonging to Joshua Bawden,…my first Cousin, we being Sisters Children; however, tho' I met him twice, and my Blood boiled in my Veins at the Sight of him, yet we did not speak on either Side, which was no doubt a very great Misfortune to me; for had he known who I was, he would, I am well satisfied, have carry'd me with him."

Pellow died in 1745, and was buried at St Gluvias, unmarried in England.

== Book ==
Pellow wrote an extensive captivity narrative entitled The History of the Long Captivity and Adventures of Thomas Pellow in South-Barbary. Pellow's book chronicles his many adventures spent during his 23-year-long captivity (summer 1715 – July 1738) giving a detailed account of his capture by Barbary pirates, his experiences as a slave under Sultan Moulay Ismail, and his final escape from Morocco back to his Cornish origins.

== Commentary ==
Allen R. Meyers wrote a paper in 1998 that "describes the development of a slave army, the 'Abid al Bukhari, which enabled Ismail ibn al-Sharif (aka Moulay), to establish a large and relatively durable Moroccan state". Ismail created the slave army in an effort to "consolidate his power, to expand the kingdom, to suppress internal dissent, and to repulse the European and Ottoman threat". Meyers states that with the army's support, Ismail was able to collect taxes, suppress rebellion, and maintain public order. Ismail first created his army by confiscating three thousand male slaves from the residents of Marrakesh, which he would later increase to around 50,000 slaves, many of whom were part of a group of people called Haratins. Creating this self-sufficient army could also have its drawbacks, with uprisings and rebellions, such as a poor relationship with Islamic scholars due to his enslaving of fellow Muslims, an act that was considered to be blasphemous.

== See also ==
- Trans-Saharan slave trade
