= Giovanni Battista Visconti =

Italian archaeologist and museum curator

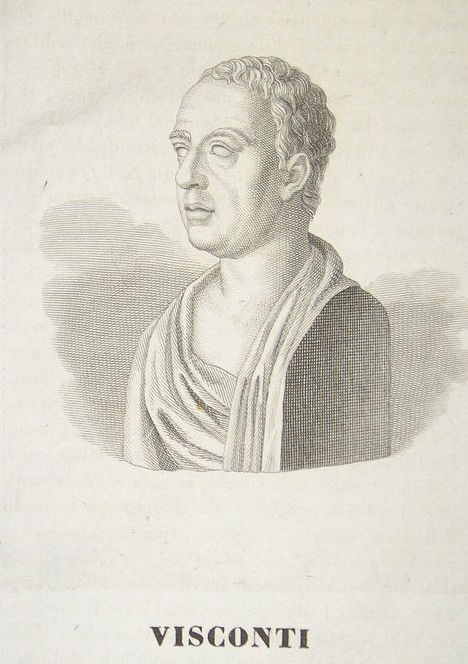
- Born: Giovanni Battista Antonio Visconti; 26 December 1722; Vernazza, Republic of Genoa
- Died: 2 September 1784 (aged 61); Rome, Papal States
- Occupations: Archaeologist, museum curator
- Years active: 1768–1784
- Children: Ennio Quirino Visconti; Filippo Aurelio Visconti

Giovanni Battista Visconti (26 December 1722 – 2 September 1784) was an Italian archaeologist and museum curator.

== Biography ==
Giovanni Battista Visconti was born in 1722 in Vernazza, Liguria. He was raised in a scholarly family, came to Rome at the age of 14 and joined the circle of Johann Joachim Winckelmann after 1750.

After the murder of Winckelmann in 1768, Visconti succeeded him as the Papal States' Superintendent of Antiquities (Commissario delle Antichità), a post which he retained until his death in 1784. His main task was to reorganise and secure new acquisitions for the Vatican Museums and he became the first curator of the Museo Pio-Clementino, commissioning its neoclassical form. He also controlled the granting of export-licences to archaeologists and dealers throughout the Papal States - such as Gavin Hamilton and Thomas Jenkins.

Visconti helped the papal treasurer Giovanni Angelo Braschi to direct purchases, excavations, restorations and displays for the new museum, enlisting artists, dealers and entrepreneurs in the thriving antiquities industry in Rome. He effected the purchase of major works from the Mattei, Barberini, Verospi, Altemps and other local collections, to prevent their export.

In 1782 Visconti began the publication of a new kind of illustrated catalogue, with a detailed essay on each of the Vatican sculptures. His more famous son and assistant in publication, Ennio Quirino Visconti, completed the subsequent volumes of the series while Commissioner of Antiquities, continuing Visconti’s zeal and scholarly methods. Another son, Filippo Aurelio Visconti, worked with his brother in the Louvre, served as Commissioner of Antiquities in Rome and published the Vatican Chiaramonti antiquities (1808) with Giuseppe Antonio Guattani.

He died on 2 September 1784. After his death his son, Filippo Aurelio, succeeded his father as Commissario and in 1785 was made director of the Musei Capitolini. Ennio Quirino eventually became director of the Musee Napoleon in Paris, to which many antiquities from Italy had been carried off by Napoleon. Giovanni Battista Visconti’s objectivity, precision and learning led the way to modern professionalism in archaeological scholarship and museology.

== Writings ==
- Il Museo Pio Clementino. Vol. 1. Rome: Ludovico Mirri. 1782. doi:10.11588/diglit.3451.
- Francesco Cancellieri, ed. (1806). Dissertazioni epistolari di G.B. Visconti e Filippo Waquier De La Barthe. Rome: Antonio Fulgoni.
