= Liborio Angelucci =

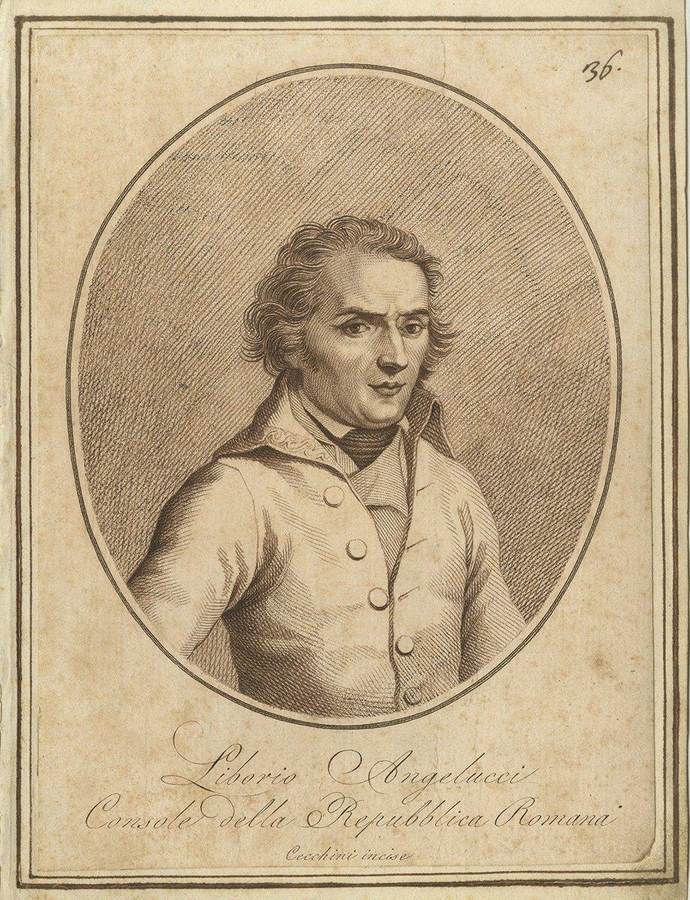

Consul of the Roman Republic
- In office 20 March 1798 – 30 September 1799 Serving with Ennio Quirino Visconti, Giacomo de Mattheis
- Preceded by: Office established
- Succeeded by: Office abolished

Personal details
- Born: 1746 Rome, Papal States
- Died: 1811 (aged 65) Milan, Kingdom of Italy
- Profession: Politician, physician

Liborio Angelucci (born 1746, Rome; died 1811, Milan) was a Roman politician and physician.

== Biography ==
He had an excellent reputation as a physician and obstetrician and as a scholar because he was editor of the first Roman edition of Dante's Divine Comedy.

He was among the first in Rome to accept ideas of French Revolution and one of the few who worked for it. He was in contact with de Bassville whose doctor he was.

In May 1794, he was arrested on charges of relationships with France and plotting against Pius VI. Released from Castel Sant'Angelo on medical parole, he was in house arrest. Three years later (August 1797), he was arrested again for plotting to murder the Pope then released again as the result of French help following the treaty of Tolentino. He was now regarded as one of the pro-French party leader and he developed relationships with the new French Ambassador Eugène de Beauharnais.

From September 1797 to March 1798, after a brief stop in Milan where he saw Ugo Foscolo, he met Napoleon Bonaparte first in Rastadt, then in Paris to advocate for the Rome release. Following the fall of Rome when Berthier French troops invaded on 10 February 1798, Angelucci returned to Rome and was called up as a Prefect, and shortly after, Consul of the Roman Republic (20 March 1798).

As soon as he came to power, he was far from meeting the patriotic and democratic expectations of his fellows, concerned primarily with his family economical position while avoiding French occupants offence.

Following numerous misappropriations, he was forced to resign but remained a prominent politician.

In September 1799, at the fall of Roman Republic, he followed the French and took refuge in France, in Marseille and Paris. After Marengo, he went back to Italy but not to Rome. Instead, he stopped in Milan where he became the Surgeon and Major Surgeon of the Italian Division of the "Veliti della Guardia".

In 1809, when the French army occupied Rome, he went back home but he was kept out into the margins of public life by the Imperial administration.

He was a member of the Roman Republic National Institute (Istituto nazionale della Repubblica romana).

He died on 1811.

== Posthumous reputation ==
In Puccini's Tosca, the character of Cesare Angelotti was based in part upon Liborio Angelucci's life.

== Bibliography ==
- De Felice, Enzo (1961). "Liborio Angelucci" (in Italian). Dizionario Biografico – Treccani.
- Pirozzi, Luca. "Attività giornalistica e impegno rivoluzionario nella Roma di fine Settecento" (in Italian).
