= Marcus Berg (writer) =

Swedish memoir writer (1714–1761)

Marcus Berg (1714–1761) was a Swedish memoir writer.

He was abducted by Barbary pirates in 1754 and spent two years as a slave to the sultan of Morocco, before he was bought free and able to return to Sweden. His memoirs about his years as a slave in Morocco was published and attracted a lot of attention.
