= Raid on Penzance =

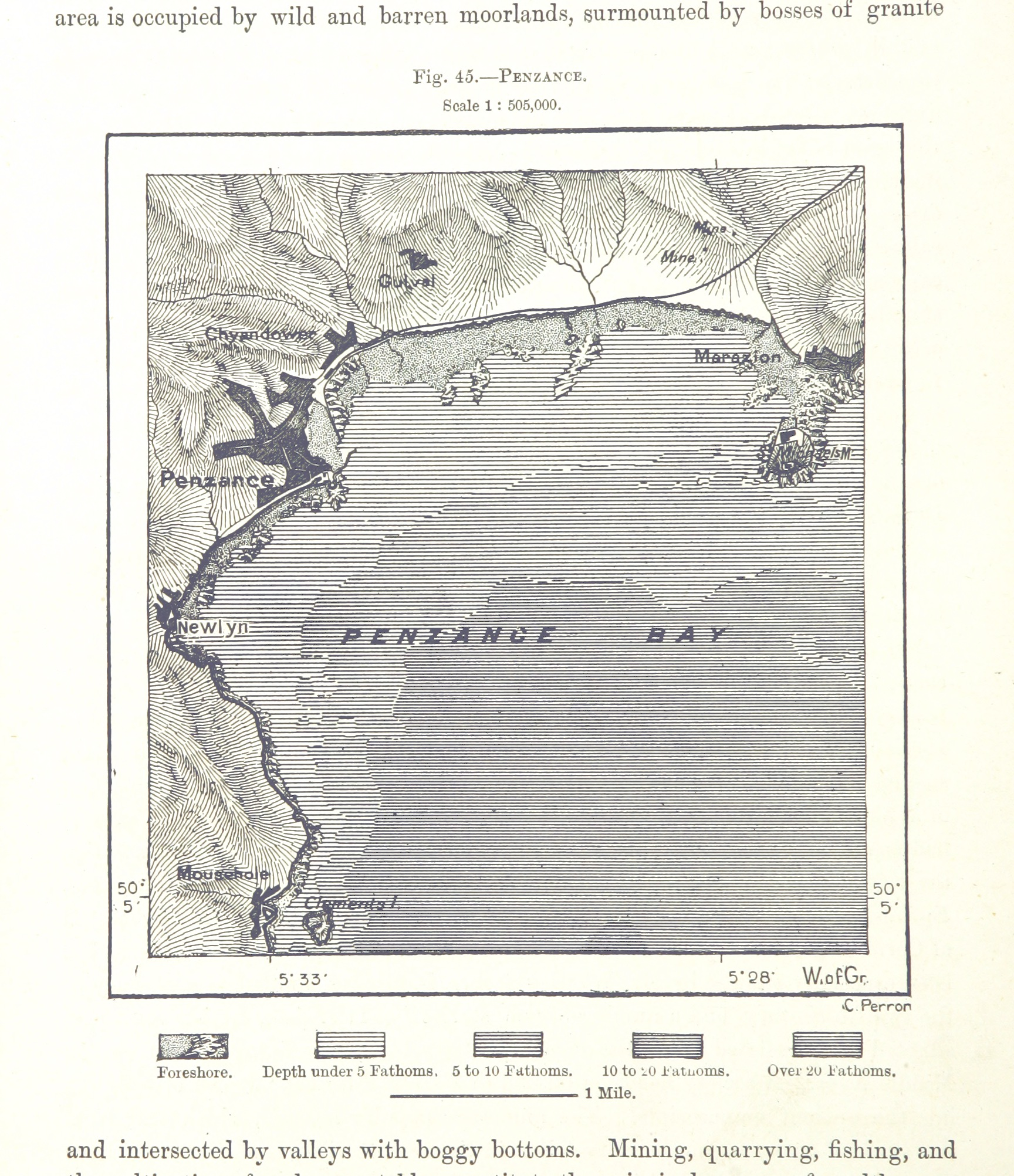
- Penzance Bay
Date	July 1640
Location	Penzance, Duchy of Cornwall
Result	Algerian victory

Belligerents
Regency of Algiers	England

Strength
Unknown	Unknown

Casualties and losses
Unknown	60 captured

The Raid on Penzance was a military operation initiated by the Barbary Pirates of Algiers against Britain in Penzance in July of 1640.

== Background ==
Raids by the Barbary pirates continued to worsen during the 17th century and the English were largely powerless in stopping the corsairs' due to the damage caused by the Wars of the Three Kingdoms.

0, 60 Algerian fleets were spotted traversing the English Channel. In July of that year, they launched a raid on Penzance in Cornwall, seizing 60 men, women, and children. Following this, the number of Christian slaves taken captive in Algiers reached 25,000, with 3,000 of them being English.

== Aftermath ==
The period of the Civil Wars and the Protectorate was a time of vulnerability for England, which was unable to prevent the Barbary raids. It was not until the late 17th century under Charles II (after 1660) that the Royal Navy was able to begin to effectively combat the corsairs.
