= Joseph Pitts (author) =

Englishman enslaved by Barbary pirates

Joseph Pitts (1662 or 1663–1739) was an English sailor who was captured by Barbary pirates, and sold into slavery in Algiers in 1678. Forced to convert to Islam, he was the first known Englishman to undertake the ḥajj or Muslim pilgrimage, when, as a slave, he accompanied his Muslim master to Mecca and Medina in 1685 or 1686. Having escaped from Algiers and returned to England between 1694 and 1695, he published in 1704 a memoir of his experiences in Algiers including a substantial description of the pilgrimage ceremonies.

== Biography ==
=== Early life and slavery in Algiers ===
Joseph Pitts was born in Exeter into a Nonconformist family in 1662 or 1663. His father John was "probably the John Pitts who signed the petition of a church in Exeter to Charles II". As a young boy of fourteen of fifteen, he became a sailor and sailed on Easter Tuesday 1678 bound for Newfoundland. Having fished off the Grand Banks, the ship turned southwards to sell the dried fish in Bilbao and the Canaries, but near the Spanish coast they were captured by an Algerian corsair commanded by a Dutch renegade.

Once landed in Algiers, Pitts was paraded in the Bedesten, a covered market where slaves were sold. His first master Mustapha, a member of the Turkish elite, beat him for the sheer pleasure of it, stopping only to smoke his pipe and often putting Pitts’s feet in brine which caused him “intolerable pain.” Although constantly encouraged to become a Muslim by Mustapha, Joseph remained uncertain whether Mustapha really wanted him to renounce his faith, since this would mean the loss of any ransom. After a few months, Pitts was sent to sea in a corsair vessel, and Pitts lived in hopes of being captured by a Christian ship, but on his return from his voyage, his "heart began to be heavy with the thoughts of entring [sic] again into [his] former misery".

He was therefore "comforted" when he was sold by Mustapha to another Turk called Dilberre Ibrahim [modern Turkish Dilber], as he had been told that "my new patroon [master] was better than the old". Ibrahim wanted to give Pitts to his brother in Tunis as a present. After a two-week voyage, the party landed in Tunis, and Ibrahim’s nephew, proud of having a Christian wait on him, make him walk through the streets with him. On his perambulations, Pitts met the English Consul in Tunis, Francis Baker, and asked him if he could redeem him. Unfortunately, the English merchants in Tunis could not raise the required sum, and when Ibrahim’s brother in Tunis decided he did not want him, Pitts was forced to return to Algiers and many more years of slavery and exile.

Ibrahim was then persuaded by his younger brother in Algiers to try to convert Pitts, arguing that winning a convert to Islam would atone for some of the sins of Ibrahim’s brother’s youth. The brothers tried every form of oral persuasion on Pitts, but to no avail, so they resorted to torture. Pitts resisted as long as he could, but finally agreed to become a Muslim. Pitts claimed that such savage treatment was unusual, writing "it is usually reported among us here in England, that when any Christians are taken by the Algerines, they are put to the extremest tortures, that they may be thereby brought over to the Mahometan faith … but I do assure the reader that it is a very false report, for they seldom use such severities on that account, though it was my hard lot to be so unmercifully dealt with. They do not use to force any Christian to renounce their religion."

Shortly after Pitts had arrived in Algiers, he had written to his father, and was extremely distressed when his father's reply eventually reached him just after his conversion, since his father wrote that "he would rather hear of Joseph's death than of his being a Mahometan." Joseph Pitts replied to his father, explaining the terrible tortures he had endured, and when his father John received Joseph's letter, telling him of Joseph's conversion, he took advice from the most senior members of the nonconformist community in Exeter, notably Joseph Hallett (1628?–1689) of the St. James Meeting and John Hopping (d. 1705) of the Bow meeting. They advised John Pitts to write to his son "as tenderly as possible", since Joseph had not "sinned the unpardonable sin", which his father did, saying in his letter "Child, I do believe, that what thou hast done with thy mouth, was not with thy heart … yet the door of grace and mercy is open for thee … [and] I will promise thee as welcome to me upon thy return and repentance, as though thou hadst never done it." The receipt of his father's letter is the crucial event in Joseph Pitts's captivity. Had his father not replied to his letter, or replied angrily denouncing Joseph as a renegade, then Joseph may well have accepted his fate and decided to make his fortune as a Muslim in Algiers, particularly, as "because Ibrahim had always found me honest and designed to make me his secretary or treasurer, which might have proved a snare for me and made me have had less inclination to return."

Fortunately for Pitts, in the aftermath of the French fleet's bombardment of Algiers in 1683, Ibrahim lost his life in an attempt to become ruler and Joseph was sold by Ibrahim's widow to an old Turkish bachelor called Eumer [modern Turkish Ömer], by whom he was employed "to look after his house, dress his meat, wash his clothes, in short do all the things that are looked on as a servant-maid's work in England." Joseph's new master took him on the pilgrimage to Mecca. There is some debate about the exact year in which Pitts undertook this pilgrimage, as the evidence from Pitts's own writing is conflicting, but it is likely to be 1685 or 1686, the former date being that preferred by Islamic studies scholar Charles Beckingham. Pitts was given his freedom at Mecca, but stayed with his former master, while becoming a soldier in the Algerian army. He became a bombacı, or specialist in mortars, and in 1688 participated in an attack on Oran in Western Algeria, at that time an outpost of Spain, and later joined an Algerian expedition against the Sultan of Morocco. Eumer sent Joseph back to school where he learnt to read "with considerable proficiency" and also "understanding something of writing I could strike the Turkish character beyond [my fellows'] expectation; and all in the school admir’d me for it". However, since his master was related to the ruler of Algiers, Joseph again feared promotion and so "laid aside his writing". He also declined the offer of a wife, although his master promised to make him and his children his heirs. "Had I been prevailed upon to alter my condition", he wrote, "I tremble to think what the issue might have been, Many more kindnesses of this my last master I could relate; for which I cannot but say, I had a great love for him, even as a father. But still, this was not England, and I wanted to be at home".

=== Escape from Algiers and return to England ===
Pitts had made several voyages as a sailor in the Algerian navy, hoping to be captured by a Christian vessel, but without success. Finally, in 1693, while visiting an English doctor (also a slave) for an eye-infection, he made the acquaintance of a Mr. Butler, an English merchant in Algiers. After much cross-questioning (for aiding a renegade to escape was a capital offence), and through the good offices of a redeemed English slave waiting for his passage back to England, John Thomas of Bristol, Mr. Butler agreed to acquaint the English consul in Algiers of Pitts's desire to escape. The consul was Thomas Baker, the brother of the Consul in Tunis, who many years previously had tried to ransom Joseph. Since the Ottomans had requested the ruler of Algiers for naval assistance in early 1694, Joseph exchanged his summer military duties for naval ones and was given a letter by Thomas Baker which he was to hand to William Raye, the British Consul in Smyrna [modern Izmir]. Joseph made himself known to William Raye, and after much nerve-wracking waiting in Smyrna and the island of Scio [modern Chios], managed to escape on a French ship bound for Leghorn [modern Livorno] in Italy. Even at this eleventh hour, Joseph admits to the call of Algiers "The loss of the profitable returns, which I might make of what money I had to Algier, and of receiving eight months' pay due to me there and the frustrating of my hopes and expectations which I had from my master who made me large promises of leaving me considerable substance at his death; and I believe he meant as he promised for I must acknowledge he was like a father to me … in short, he loved me as if I had been his own child, which made me sincerely to love him, I do acknowledge. This was a great temptation to me to return to Algier".

The ship reached Leghorn after a month. After 25 days quarantine, Pitts travelled on foot through Italy in the company of some Dutch slaves, who had arrived in Leghorn from Algiers after a ransom had been paid to free them. Just as Pitts reached the Alps, his left leg failed him, and he was obliged to let the Dutch group continue on their way without him; once his leg had healed, he set off on his own. Despite being attacked and robbed of most of his money in southern Germany, he eventually reached Frankfurt, but the gates of the city had been shut at dusk and he was refused entry. However, through the combined efforts of a German soldier, a French merchant and a former German slave in Algiers, the finances were collected to enable Pitts to travel down the Rhine, and he finally reached Sluys on the Dutch coast, from where he obtained a passage to Harwich in England. Pitts eventually reached Exeter in 1695, where he was reunited with his father (his mother died about a year before his return), about 17 years after leaving them and his native city for the "foreign countries" he had so much wanted to see.

=== Later life ===
On his return to Exeter, Pitts was readmitted to his nonconformist church, although he admitted in the preface to the third edition of 1731 that he had been criticised for having become a Muslim ("I have been often reflected upon for my apostasy.") Some scholars have cast doubt on whether people who claimed to have been forcibly converted to Islam were telling the truth, and Pitts was clearly aware of this accusation as he went on in the 1731 preface to say, "I do not pretend to excuse what I did; but whether it was voluntarily, or I was a true Mussulman, let any judge when they have considered what hazard I ran in making my escape. I was in a much fairer way for honour and preferment in Algier, than I could ever expect to have been in England."

Pitts soon married and had a family. He also decided to publish a book detailing the story of his life in Algiers and his escape, while also describing those facets of Islam with which he was personally acquainted in the hope "to do some good … and also make some manner (at least) of restitution and reparation for my past defection". For his book, he consulted the works of scholars, correcting authors like Jean de Thévenot (1633–1667), when their accounts conflicted with his personal observations. He renewed his acquaintance with Consul Thomas Baker, was offered a government position in London by William Lowndes (1652–1724), the Secretary to the Treasury, (but declined it "for private reasons"), and was probably acquainted with Lord Peter King (c. 1669–1734), the Lord High Chancellor and a native of Exeter, to whom he dedicated the third edition of his book. He died in Exeter in 1739.

== A True and Faithful Account of the Religion and Manners of the Mohammetans ==
=== As a Middle Eastern captivity narrative ===
Middle Eastern captivity narratives are the (auto)biographies of Europeans who had been captured and enslaved anywhere in the Muslim World (most deal with North Africa) and had either by escape, ransoming or exchange of prisoners had returned to their homeland and had decided to describe their experiences. More than 100 such narratives exist, mainly in English and French, but there are examples in Dutch, Danish, German, Norwegian, Spanish, Italian and Portuguese; they range in date from the narrative of Englishman John Fox who was captured by Ottoman galleys near Gibraltar in 1563 to that of the German traveller and surgeon, Simon Pfeiffer, who was captured on a Greek island by Algerian corsairs over 250 years later, in 1825. Captivity narratives have been reassessed as sources of historical information in recent years, by scholars such as Linda Colley and Nabil Matar.

English captivity narratives usually emphasize the narrator’s courage and steadfastness in the face of what they often termed "Barbarian cruelty", emphasizing the providence of the Protestant God and the importance of Englishness, while playing down the fear and shame felt by almost all captives. Pitts's captivity narrative, however, is less bombastic than most, and is as effective in describing the psychological and physical trauma of loss of identity as any that preceded or succeeded it. Indeed, it is all the more credible since Pitts does not present himself as just a "hardened Briton who had endured years of slavery and labour among the Muslims in order to preserve the integrity of his religious and national identity". It is true that Pitts does indeed conform to this norm by emphasizing the fortitude and determination it took to retain his Christian identity, and much of the narrative can be read as that of a plain-speaking, honest Englishman, but Pitts continually subverts this picture of himself, firstly, by describing how he was often assailed by overwhelming feelings of fear, loneliness, guilt and shame, and, secondly, by his regular declarations of love and respect for his Turkish master, Eumer.

=== As a travel narrative ===
There were remarkably few accurate and detailed English-language descriptions of North Africa published either before or during Pitts's lifetime, and most of these were also accounts by captives. Some of the motifs he describes are common to other captivity narratives, for example, how slaves were sold in the market, methods of torture and punishment, the layout of the city of Algiers, the names and locations of other towns in Algeria, and the internal organisation of the Turkish civil and military government, although he often gives much more detail than other authors. However, as well as being interested in public matters, Pitts was also a keen ethnographic observer of domestic issues, such as marriage, burial, children, dress, food (there are references, for example, to couscous, kebabs and köftes), and even wrestling. His descriptions are fuller than most other captivity narratives and appear to be accurate inasmuch as they are rarely if ever contradicted by the accounts of contemporary travellers describing other regions of the Muslim world or later visitors to Ottoman North Africa.

Pitts’s book in fact does not display the features of a typical travel writer of the period, someone who has read up on his subject, quotes previous writers and puts the places he visits into historical, architectural or archaeological perspective. A typical example of this is Thomas Shaw’s Travels or Observations Relating to Several Parts of Barbary and the Levant, first published in 1738 while Pitts was still alive. Shaw’s book talks about plants and animals, about classical geography and about the Roman archaeology and history of North Africa, but has almost nothing to say about the contemporary state. In great contrast, Pitts describes the society in which he lived for fifteen years in a very personal way, particularly those domestic and military features with which he was best acquainted, often interspersed with his own memories and illustrated by mundane (and therefore all the more believable) anecdotes. His style is simple, and he makes few claims on the reader’s credulity, claiming that the book is just “my poor memoirs,” but goes on to say, “I have the most valuable qualification of an historian on my side, i.e. truth”.

=== As a study of Islam ===
Given the military, cultural and theological tensions between the world of Islam and Christendom in the 17th century, it is no surprise that Joseph Pitts follows the general tenor of English books of the period and expresses himself negatively about Islam. Indeed, given his need to justify his conversion, and emphasize his Christian identity on his return to England, it would have been remarkable had Pitts not done so, since for most people in seventeenth-century Europe, identity equalled religion. So Pitts can be found using phrases such as “false worship” to describe Islam and “vile and debauched imposter" as an epithet of the Prophet Muhammad, while calling the Qur’an “that legend of falsities and abominable follies and absurdities”. However, Pitts does differentiate between Islam as a faith and the practical worship of Muslims. He has no interest in Islamic history or Islamic theology, nor does he mention any famous Muslim religious scholar or philosopher in his book. He does, however, take considerable pains to describe, in a relatively objective way, the Islamic rituals as he witnessed them, indeed, as he himself practised them, often illustrated by personal comments and observations; for example his description of the prayer and ablution rituals takes up much of chapter six. He was also very impressed with Islamic piety and describes with considerable approval Muslims’ devotion to prayer and to reading the Holy Book, but by far the longest, most detailed, most personal and most interesting of Pitts’ descriptions of Islam concerns the pilgrimage, and it is this section of his book which has intrigued scholars the most, since it includes the first detailed description in English of the ḥajj and of the Muslim Holy Places, and the first by an English-speaking eye-witness. Pitts was also one of the first European travellers to Arabia to describe the overland return to Cairo from Mecca and Medina by camel train. Sir Richard Burton (1821–1890) added Pitts’s description of the pilgrimage as an appendix to his Personal Narrative of a Pilgrimage to Al Madinah and Meccah and only found two errors in Pitts, one regarding a confusion between Ishaq and Ismail and one regarding the Black Stone or Ḥajar Aswad, which Pitts described as being formerly white, though Pitts's views on the prophets and on the Black Stone are not unknown in popular Islamic tradition.

Pitts was clearly impressed by the devotion of Muslim pilgrims, and often describes his own feelings during the rituals; however, Pitts makes it clear that he distinguishes between the religious zeal and ardour of Muslims, which he admires, and the religion of Islam itself, which he is unable to accept, as can be seen from two of the most famous passages in his book: “It was a sight, indeed, able to pierce one’s heart, to behold so many thousands in their garments of humility and mortification, with their naked heads, and cheeks watered with tears; and to hear their grievous sighs and sobs, begging earnestly for the remission of their sins”, and again: “And I profess, I could not chuse but admire to see those poor creatures, so extraordinary devout, and affectionate, when they are about these superstitions, and with what awe and trembling, they were possessed; insomuch that I could scarce forbear shedding of tears, to see their zeal, tho’ blind and idolatrous”.

Indeed, Pitts was always at pains to remind his Christian audience, that he had never accepted Islam in his heart, and that his outward devotion disguised his inward rejection of the religion.

== Family ==
Joseph Pitts married Hannah Coome (or Coombe; 1670–1749) in Heavitree, near Exeter in 1697, and they had four children:

- Hannah (b. 1698) who married Joseph Allen in Holy Trinity Church, Exeter in 1725.
- Elizabeth (b. c. 1700) who married William Scutt in St. Leonard’s Church, Exeter in 1732.
- Joseph (1702–1788), who became a well-known dissenting minister in London, Hitchin and Bocking, near Braintree, before retiring to Taunton.
- Esther (or Hester; b. c. 1706), married Slocombe Drake in Exeter in 1739 and after his death in 1742, married John Reed in 1743 in Staple Fitzpaine, Somerset.

== Editions of A True and Faithful Account of the Religion and Manners of the Mohammetans ==
- Pitts, Joseph (1704). A true and faithful account of the religion and manners of the Mohammetans. In which is a particular relation of their pilgrimage to Mecca, The Place of Mohammet's Birth; And a Description of Medina, and of his Tomb there. As likewise of Algier, and the Country adjacent: And of Alexandria, Grand-Cairo, &c. With an Account of the Author's being taken Captive, the Turks Cruelty to him, and of his Escape. In which are many things never Publish'd by any Historian before. (Exon [Exeter]: printed by S. Farley for Philip Bishop and Edward Score).
  - The first edition.
- Pitts, Joseph (1717). A true and faithful account of the religion and manners of the Mohammetans. In which is a particular relation of their pilgrimage to Mecca, The Place of Mohammet's Birth; And a Description of Medina, and of his Tomb there. As likewise of Algier, and the Country adjacent: And of Alexandria, Grand-Cairo, &c. With an Account of the Author's being taken Captive, the Turks Cruelty to him, and of his Escape. In which are many things never Publish'd by any Historian before.
  - The Second Edition (Exon [Exeter]: printed by S. Farley for Philip Bishop and Edward Score). Not authorised by Pitts.
- Pitts, Joseph (1719). A true and faithful account of the religion & manners of the Mahometans. In which is a particular relation of their pilgrimage to Mecca, The Place of Mahomet's Birth; And a Description of Medina, and of his Tomb there: As likewise of Algier and the Country adjacent; and of Alexandria, Grand-Cairo, &c. With an Account of the Author's being taken Captive, the Turks Cruelty to him and of his Escape. In which are many Things never publish'd by any Historian before.
  - The second edition. (London: printed for W. Taylor). Another pirated edition, not authorised by Pitts, also called the second edition.
- Pitts, Joseph (1731). A faithful account of the religion and manners of the Mahometans. In which is a particular relation of their pilgrimage to Mecca, the Place of Mahomet's Birth; and a Description of Medina, and of his Tomb there: As likewise of Algier, and the Country adjacent; and of Alexandria, Grand Cairo, &c. With an Account of the Author's being taken Captive; the Turks Cruelty to him; and of his Escape. In which are many Things never publish'd by any Historian before.
  - The third edition, corrected, with additions. To this edition is added a map of Mecca, and a Cut of the Gestures of the Mahometans in their Worship (London: printed for J. Osborn and T. Longman, and R. Hett). Authorised by Pitts, with substantial alterations and additions to the first edition, plus two engravings (one of Mecca and one of Muslims at prayer)
- Pitts, Joseph (1738). A faithful account of the religion and manners of the Mahometans. In which is a particular relation of their pilgrimage to Mecca, the Place of Mahomet's Birth; and a Description of Medina, and of his Tomb there: As likewise of Algier, and the Country adjacent; and of Alexandria, Grand Cairo, &c. With an Account of the Author's being taken Captive; the Turks Cruelty to him; and of his Escape. In which are many Things never publish'd by any Historian before.
  - The fourth edition, corrected, with additions. To this edition is added a map of Mecca, and a Cut of the Gestures of the Mahometans in their Worship (London: printed for T. Longman and R. Hett). (Republished in 1971, Farnborough: Gregg International). Includes some very minor additions to the third edition as well as a few stylistic changes. Almost certainly authorised by Pitts.
- Vitkus, Daniel (2001) (ed.). Piracy, Slavery and Redemption: Barbary Captivity Narratives from Early Modern England. (New York: Columbia University Press).
  - Annotated reprint of the first edition of 1704 with modernised spelling on pp. 218–340.
- Auchterlonie, Paul (2012) (ed.). Encountering Islam: Joseph Pitts, an English Slave in 17th-Century Algiers and Mecca: a Critical Edition, with Biographical Introduction and Notes, of Joseph Pitts of Exeter’s ‘Religion and Manners of the Mahometans’, 1731. (London: Arabian Publishing).
  - Fully annotated edition of the third edition of 1731, using the original spelling and giving the original pagination, and with a substantial introduction (pp. 3–96), as well as notes, illustrations, maps and indexes.

== Legacy ==
Of all the books on Islam of the period, Pitts’s is one of the few to give any approximation of what it is like to be a Muslim, and even if it continually and fundamentally rejects Islam, it does give the readers some inkling of why so many Muslims held the beliefs they did and why they worshipped in the way they did. Nabil Matar considers Pitts’s book is a record of “a journey to the alien and a return to the familiar, a separation from England and a resumption of Englishness, a conversion to Islam on the ‘outside’, as he repeatedly affirmed, and an adherence to Christianity on the inside”. He further argues that captivity narratives “served to ground the demonization of the Moors [Arabs] not on fancy or fiction, but on the authenticity of personal experience”, but Pitts’s “personal experience” was an ambiguous one; for the readers of the period, it may well have been a convincing refutation of a hostile faith. However, a modern audience can better detect the ambivalence of Pitts’ attitude to Muslims. Had Pitts been less honest, he could have suppressed all his comments on Islam which were not overtly negative, and could have omitted all the expressions of affection he had towards his third master Eumer; the fact that he did not, testifies to how he was never able fully to lay to rest his Muslim past, which continued to affect him deep into old age, as the third edition of 1731 makes clear, and Pitts's book remains one of the most accurate, observational accounts of Muslim worship by an Englishman of the period.

== See also ==
- Apostasy in Islam
- Forced Conversion in Islam

== Sources ==
- Auchterlonie, Paul (2012). “Introduction.” In Pitts, Joseph. Encountering Islam: Joseph Pitts, an English Slave in 17th-Century Algiers and Mecca: a Critical Edition, with Biographical Introduction and Notes, of Joseph Pitts of Exeter’s ‘A Faithful Account of the Religion and Manners of the Mahometans’, 1731. (London: Arabian Publishing). ISBN 978-0-9558894-9-3.
- Capp, Bernard (2022). British Slaves and Barbary Corsairs, 1580–1750. (Oxford: Oxford University Press). ISBN 978-0-19-285737-8.
- Davis, Robert C. (2003). Christian Slaves, Muslim Masters: White Slavery in the Mediterranean, the Barbary Coast, and Italy, 1500–1800. (Basingstoke: Palgrave Macmillan). ISBN 978-0-333-71966-4.
- Maclean, Gerald and Matar, Nabil (2011). Britain and the Islamic World, 1558–1713. (Oxford: Oxford University Press). ISBN 978-0-19-920318-5.
- Matar, Nabil (2014). British Captives from the Mediterranean to the Atlantic. (Leiden: Brill). ISBN 978-90-04-26449-6.
- Matar, Nabil (2001). “Introduction: England and Mediterranean Captivity, 1577–1704”. In Vitkus, Daniel (ed.). Piracy, Slavery and Redemption: Barbary Captivity Narratives from Early Modern England. (New York: Columbia University Press). ISBN 978-0-231-11905-4.
- Vitkus, Daniel (2001) (ed.). Piracy, Slavery and Redemption: Barbary Captivity Narratives from Early Modern England. (New York: Columbia University Press). ISBN 978-0-231-11905-4.
