= Ennio Quirino Visconti =

Roman politician and art historian (1751–1818)

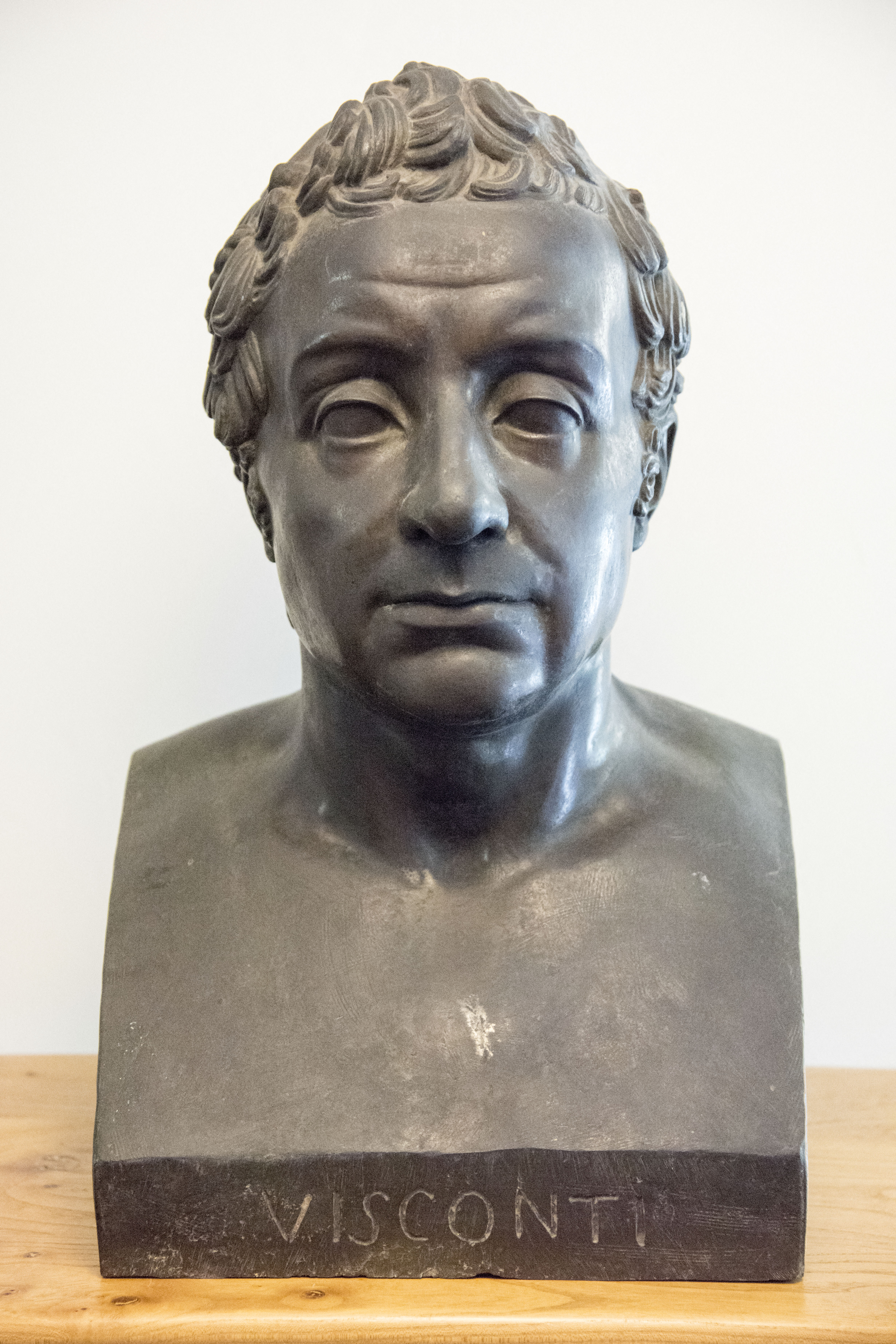
- Bust of Ennio Quirino Visconti by David d'Angers

Consul of the Roman Republic
- In office 20 March 1798 – 30 September 1799 Serving with Liborio Angelucci, Giacomo de Mattheis
- Preceded by: Office established
- Succeeded by: Office abolished

Personal details
- Born: 1 November 1751 Rome, Papal States
- Died: 7 February 1818 (aged 66) Paris, France
- Spouse: Teresa Angela Doria (m. 1785)
- Children: Louis Visconti
- Parent(s): Giovanni Battista Visconti and Orsola Visconti (née Filonardi)
- Occupation: Archaeologist; Art historian; Politician; Museum curator
- Profession: Politician, antiquarian, art historian

Ennio Quirino Visconti (November 1, 1751 – February 7, 1818) was a Roman politician, antiquarian, and art historian, papal Prefect of Antiquities, and the leading expert of his day in the field of ancient Roman sculpture. His son, Pietro Ercole Visconti, edited Versi di Ennio Quirino Visconti, raccolti per cura di Pietro Visconti while Louis Visconti became a noted architect in France. His brother, Filippo Aurelio Visconti (died 1830), was also a classical scholar, who published the Museo Chiaramonti, a successor to the Museo Pio-Clementino.

== Biography ==
Born in Rome, he was the son of Giovanni Battista Antonio Visconti, the curator of Pope Clement XIV, who reorganised and restored the papal collection of antiquities, as the Museo Pio-Clementino. Appointed by Pope Pius VI to succeed his father in the position, the brilliant and precocious Visconti took up his father's position as conservator of the Capitoline Museums in Rome in 1787. He assisted his father in producing the first volume of the Museo Pio-Clementino (1782) and produced the six remaining volumes himself, completing the last in 1807; this catalogue of the Roman sculpture and antiquities in the Vatican collections, published in the course of many years, "made an impact on archaeological studies second only to that of Winckelmann." He also published the antiquities collected in Greece by Sir Richard Worsley, 7th Baronet in Museum Worsleyanum (1794) and the sculptures in the Villa Borghese, (1796).

In 1798, Visconti became one of five consuls of the short-lived Roman Republic. With the restoration of papal control in Rome he had to emigrate to Paris, where his presence was most welcome: "this event we considered as one of the happiest results of our victories", wrote the antiquary Aubin-Louis Millin de Grandmaison. At the end of 1799 he became curator of antiquities of the Musée Napoleon housed in the Louvre, many of which were familiar to him as booty removed under the stipulations of the Treaty of Tolentino (1797); his descriptions were published by Robillard-Péronville in Le Musée français; In 1803 he was made professor of archaeology at the Institut de France. In Paris he published a series of portraits of famous men of Antiquity: Iconographie Grecque, 3 vols. 1808, and a first volume of Iconographie Romaine, 1818. At his death, extended obituaries were published by Quatremère de Quincy and others.

When Parliamentary debates were mooting the acquisition of the Elgin Marbles for the United Kingdom of Great Britain and Ireland, Visconti was among the scholars asked to offer statements of their cultural value; his memoir was translated into English and published.

Visconti was succeeded as curator of antiquities at the Louvre by Charles Othon Frédéric Jean-Baptiste de Clarac. Visconti was firmly grounded in the antiquarian traditions of connoisseurship. He rated associative values high in portraits and assumed portraits of the great (both philosophers and emperors). He concentrated on disentangling the iconography of the sculptures and reliefs he was describing. Visconti is also a liminal figure at the beginnings of modern art history, as when, Haskell and Penny note, he concedes that he has perhaps overestimated the beauty of a statue in his delight at recognising in it the portrait of Phocion. His sense of loyalty to the sculpture he had grown up with induced him to see in the best of these copies of classical Greek and Hellenistic originals, such as the Apollo Belvedere and Laocoön and His Sons, "perfected imitations" made for Roman collectors of taste, and that the traditions of ancient sculpture were a cumulative history of improvements, rather as Virgil, it was felt, refined and improved upon Homer.

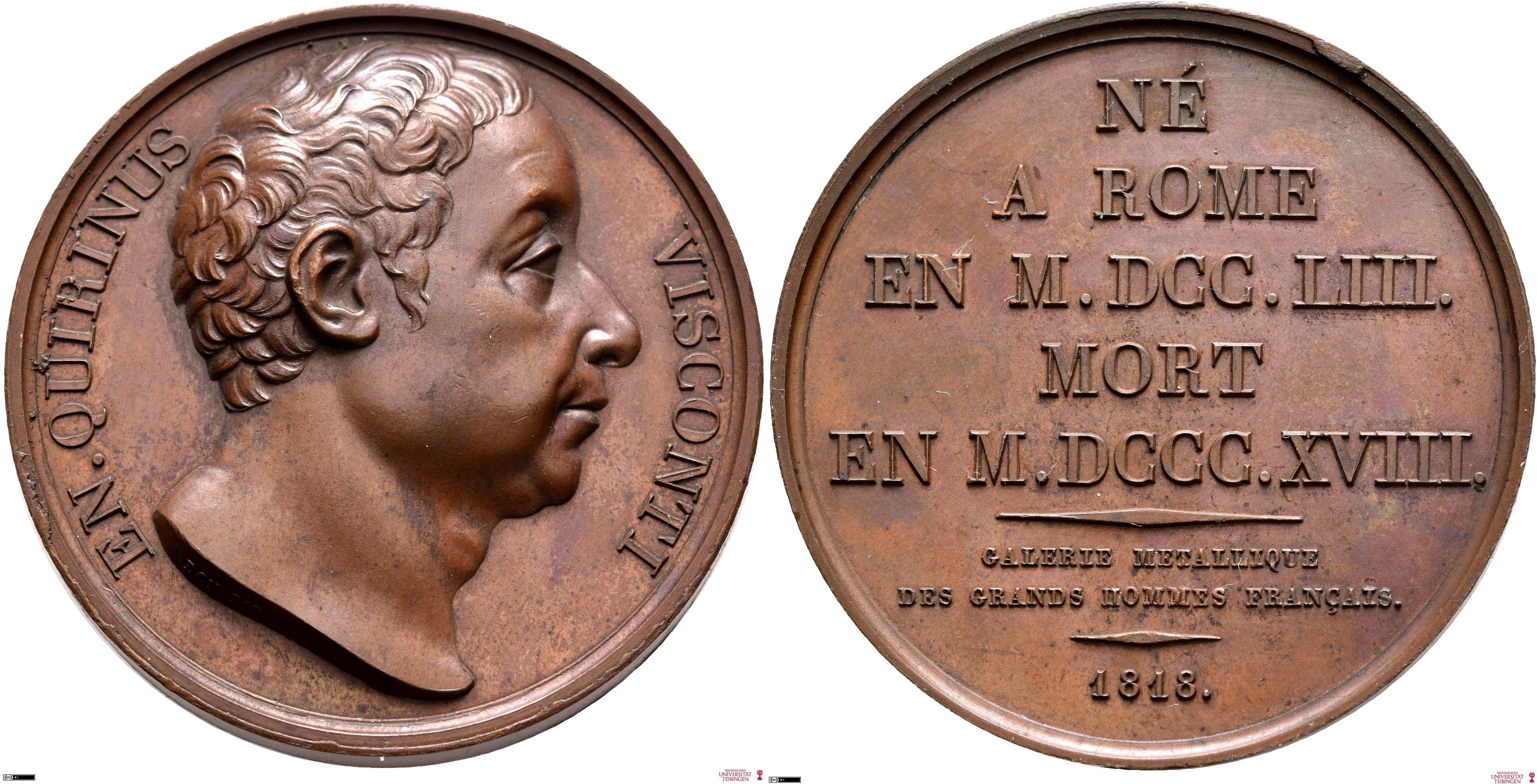
Medal Ennio Quirino Visconti 1818

In 1818 after his death a medal was struck in his honour. This medal is part of a series in order to commemorate illustrious French men illustrating his renown at the time.

== Works ==
- Museo Pio-Clementino (Milano, 1820)
- Sculture del Palazzo della Villa Borghese della Pinciana brevemente desritte 2 vols. 1796.
- Monumenti Scelti Borghesiani
- Monumenti Gabini
- Iconographia greca (as Iconographie grècque, Paris 1808)
- First volume of Iconographie romaine (4 vol., 1817–26), finished by Antoine Mongez

These five works were reissued, with emendations, in Milan, 1827–37, some under the title Opere varie italiane e francesi edited by Giovanni Labus.
