= Timbuctoo (novel) =

2012 novel by Tahir Shah

- First edition cover
- Author: Tahir Shah
- Cover artist: Rachana Shah
- Language: English
- Genre: Historical novel (British Regency era)
- Publisher: Secretum Mundi Publishing
- Publication date: July 5, 2012
- Publication place: United Kingdom
- Media type: Print (Hardback)
- Pages: 544 pp.
- ISBN: 0957242905
- Preceded by: Travels With Myself
- Followed by: Scorpion Soup

Timbuctoo is the fictional account of the illiterate American sailor Robert Adams' true life journey to Timbuktu, and his arrival in Regency London. The novel is written by Anglo-Afghan author, filmmaker, and adventurer Tahir Shah. It was first published on July 5, 2012, by Secretum Mundi Publishing.

The full title of the book is Timbuctoo: Being a singular and most animated account of an illiterate American sailor, taken as a slave in the great Zahara and, after trials and tribulations aplenty, reaching London where he narrated his tale. The story takes place between 1810—when Adams was shipwrecked—and the Spring on 1816, when he set sail for his home in Hudson, New York.

== Background ==
In the early 1990s, while "in the bowels of the London Library", the author, Tahir Shah, says he noticed an old book propping up a water pipe. Surprised that such an old and apparently valuable volume should be being used for this purpose, Shah pulled it down, and read it.

The book was The Narrative of Robert Adams, the tale of an illiterate American sailor who had been shipwrecked on the west coast of Africa at Capo Blanco in 1810. At a time when numerous European powers were eagerly dispatching their best explorers to find the city of Timbuktu (among them the likes of Mungo Park and Hugh Clapperton), the only people not searching for the "African El Dorado", was the fledgling United States of America. And so it was all the more surprising when an illiterate American sailor was discovered half naked and starving on the streets of London in the winter of 1815, claiming rather nonchalantly, that he had been to Timbuktu. He had been taken there as a slave, having been captured by Toureg warriors.

Timbuctoo is the fictional account of Robert Adams' journey to Timbuktu (now in the West African nation of Mali), loosely based on Adams' own narrative, and his arrival in Regency London.

As Shah writes in a foreword:

"The book you hold is my own fictional version of what is surely one of the greatest stories of survival ever told. I can only offer gratitude to the reader for turning a blind eye to any historical inaccuracies, and for tolerating a novelist's liberties. I am no historian, and have massaged facts and fictions into place, re-conjuring history."

Shunning conventional publishing models, Shah decided to publish the book himself, under the name Secretum Mundi Publishing. He says he did this in part to achieve the book he had "always dreamt for", and in part to draw attention to the frailties of the existing publishing system.

Timbuctoo is produced in a limited edition of 5000 copies with six large fold out maps. Five of these are reprinted from Richard Horwood's Georgian atlas of London, the last, a facsimile of the map published in the original Narrative of Robert Adams.

Many of the characters that appear were contemporary to the time. They include the Prince Regent (later George IV), Lord Alvanley, Sir Joseph Banks and Lord Byron.

== Reviews ==
- The Timbuktu Delusion in the Los Angeles Review of Books
- A Regency-era romp through decadent London hides sly lessons for the present in its plot in The Independent
- Timbuctoo by Tahir Shah: Book review in Mystical Faction blog
- Tahir Shah - Timbuctoo - Review in The View from Fez blog
- Through Time and Timbuctoo with Tahir Shah in the Mondo Ernesto blog
- Review: Timbuctoo by Tahir Shah in The Historical Dilettante blog
- Books in review: Timbuctoo writer strikes gold in Jon Rieley-Goddard's Blog
- Review: TIMBUCTOO by Tahir Shah in the Bookfabulous! blog

== Limited edition ==
The first edition of Timbuctoo is a limited edition hardback, designed by Rachana Shah along the lines of the travel books of two centuries ago. It is a large book, weighing 2 kilos (almost 4.5 lbs). It has marbled endpapers, a silk bookmark, a pouch at the rear with additional inserts, and six large fold-out maps, some of which were designed by Richard Horwood. The paper is wood-free, and the cover is embossed with raised gold type.

== Treasure hunt ==
Inspired by Timbuctoo's legend as the city of gold, Shah has hidden four golden treasures around the world. The clues to locate them are concealed within the limited edition book, and on the Timbuctoo website. Consisting of four gilded bronze heads from West Africa, the treasures have been buried in Europe, the Americas, Oceania, and Africa. Using the clues encoded in the book, and others on the web site, code-breakers will have a chance at winning one of the gilded heads. By using the GPS facility on their smart phones and iPads, treasure seekers can pinpoint the exact location of each treasure. Shah created an Indiana Jones-style video to promote the hiding of the first head.
