= Richard Horwood =

British cartographer (d. 1803)

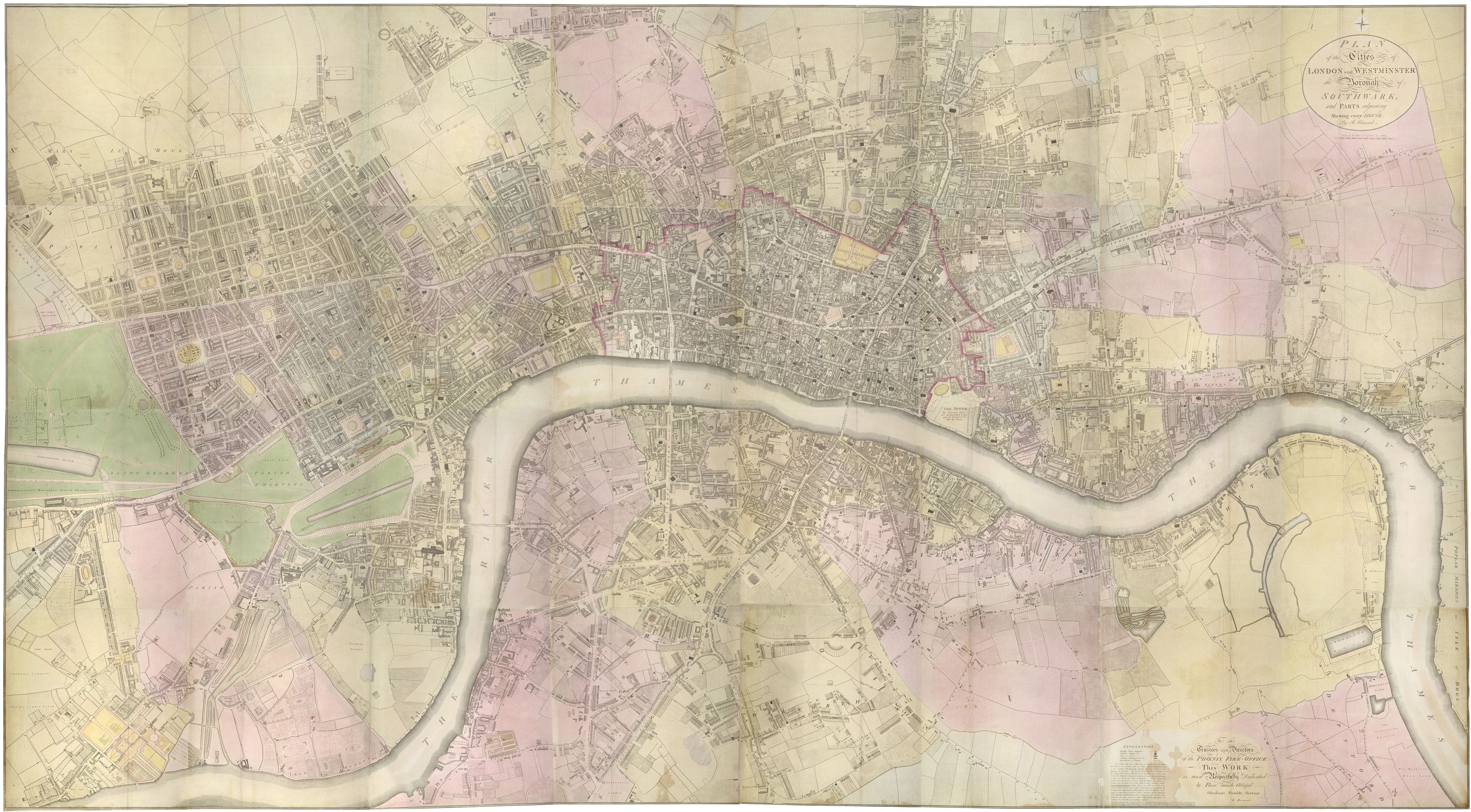
Horwood's map of London, 1792–1799

Richard Horwood (1757/8 – 3 October 1803) was a surveyor and cartographer. He is mainly remembered for his large-scale plan of London and its suburbs published in 32 sheets between 1792 and 1799. He also published a plan of Liverpool in six sheets in 1803.

== Map of London ==
Between 1792 and 1799 Horwood published a Plan of the Cities of London and Westminster the Borough of Southwark and Parts adjoining Shewing every House. At the time this was the largest map ever printed in Britain. After he decided to chart the entire city of London, down to each individual building, Horwood set about soliciting subscriptions to finance the project in 1790. His intention was to publish the complete map within two years, at a scale of 26 inches to the mile. However, the scope of the project was so extensive, and his cost to complete it so high, that rather than taking the estimated two years, the project took almost ten to complete. Despite acquiring royal patronage from King George III, the project suffered financial hardship, making it even more difficult to produce. However, Horwood eventually published the entire map, consisting of 32 sheets (four rows of eight columns). The last sheet was made available in 1799.

In 1800 he wrote of the map, in a letter to the Society for the Encouragement of Arts, Manufacture and Commerce:

The execution of it has cost me nine years severe labour and indefatigable perseverance; and these years formed the most valuable part of my life. I took every angle; measured almost every line; and after that, plotted and compared the whole work. The engraving, considering the immense mass of work, is, I flatter myself, well done.

== Map of Liverpool ==
Horwood also published a similar large-scale plan of Liverpool, in six sheets, in July 1803.

He died on 3 October 1803 in Liverpool, and was buried in Toxteth Unitarian Chapel.

== Legacy ==
After Horwood's death, the 32 plates of his London map passed to the cartographer and a publisher William Faden. Faden published three further revised and updated editions of the map, under Horwood's name and still fundamentally his work, in 1807, 1813 and 1819.

In 1985 a reduced facsimile edition of the 1813 map was published in volume format by Harry Margary in association with the Guildhall Library, with a superimposed grid, full place-name index, and introductory notes by Paul Laxton, under the title The A to Z of Regency London.

Sections of the 1813 edition are reproduced in Charles Palliser's novel The Quincunx (1989). The story is set a few years after the publication of the map, which is used by one of the characters.

A selection of the Horwood maps were used in the publication of Timbuctoo, a novel based on the adventures of Robert Adams, which includes five large fold-out maps of London.

== Bibliography ==
- Baigent, Elizabeth (2004). "Horwood, Richard (1757/8–1803)". Oxford Dictionary of National Biography (online ed.). Oxford University Press. doi:10.1093/ref:odnb/52774. (Subscription or UK public library membership required.)
- Baigent, Elizabeth (1994). "Richard Horwood's map of London: eighteenth-century cartography and the Society of Arts". RSA Journal. 142: 49–51.
- Laxton, Paul, ed. (1981). The A to Z of Regency London. Lympne Castle, Kent: Harry Margary. ISBN 0-903541-36-X.
- Laxton, Paul (1990). "Richard Horwood's plan of London: a guide to editions and variants, 1792–1819". London Topographical Record. 26: 214–63.
