= William Willshire =

British civil servant

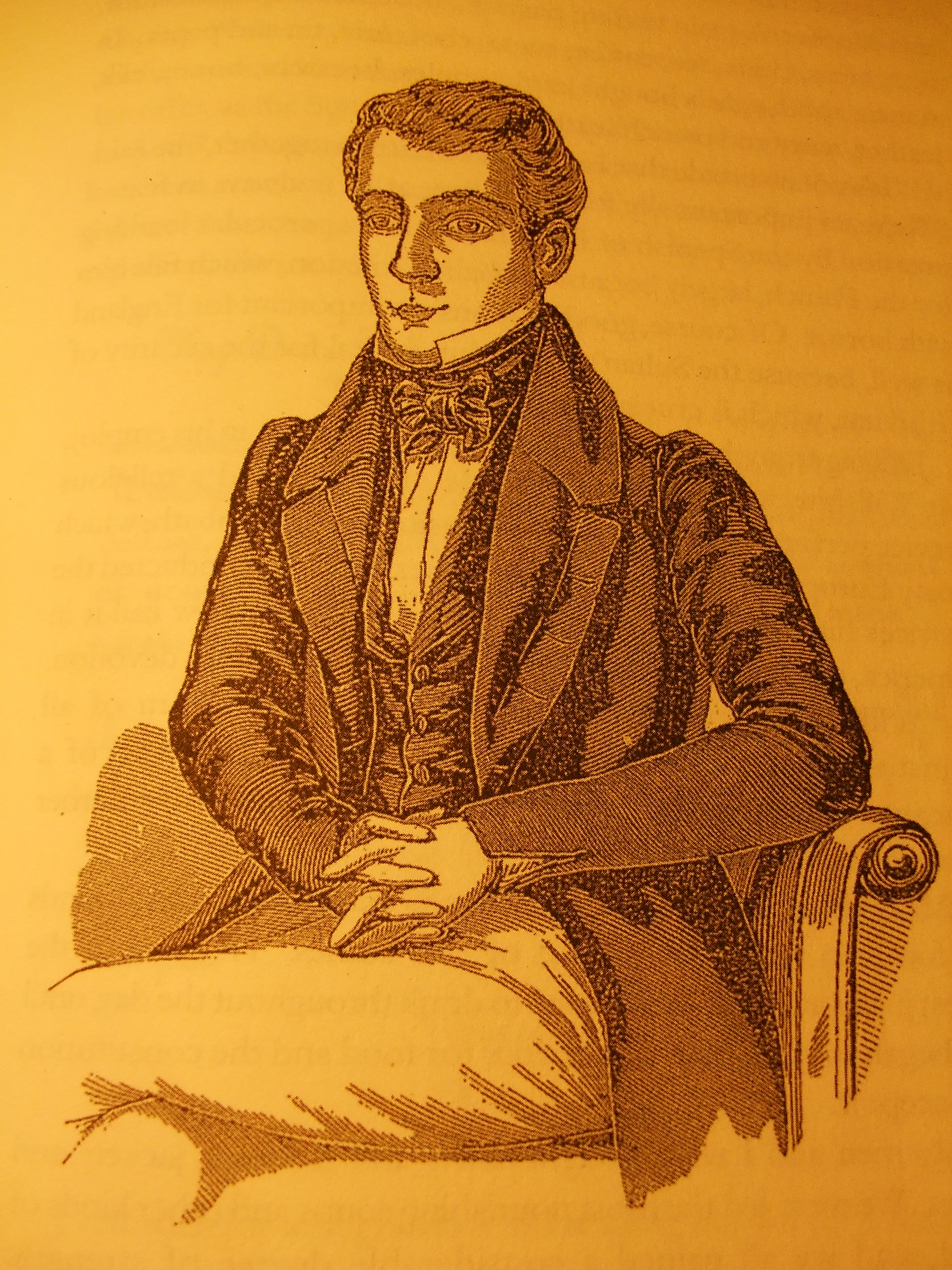
William Willshire, from Captain James Riley's Sufferings in Africa

William Willshire also known as William Wiltshire (c. 1790 – 4 August 1851), was British Vice Consul to Mogadore (Essaouira), Morocco from 1814 until 1844, before being assigned to the Consularship of Adrianople (Edirne) in 1845, until his death in 1851.

A native of London, he became an employee of English trading house James Renshaw and Co, and in early 1814 he was dispatched to Mogadore as that company's agent there. In the years thereafter he established himself as the foremost European merchant in the city, which was at that time an important trading port linking Saharan and Sub-Saharan Africa to Europe and North America. Today Willshire is best remembered as the man who redeemed, cared for, and helped repatriate hundreds of Western sailors enslaved in the Sultanate of Morocco during the early part of the 19th century, including Captain James Riley, Robert Adams, and Captain Alexander Scott, all of whom would later write and publish harrowing accounts of their hardships endured as slaves in the desert. The town of Willshire in the US state of Ohio is named after him, in thanks, by James Riley.

== Early life and posting to Mogadore ==
William Willshire was born in London in 1790 and spent his early life there. Having gained employment with the London-based, English trading house James Renshaw and Co, he was despatched to Mogadore (Essaouira), Morocco as the company's agent in early 1814, partnering a successful mercantile establishment that was engaged in trading between Mogadore and Great Britain with the resident British Vice Consul and merchant Joseph Dupuis.

=== Appointed Vice Consul ===
When Dupuis returned to Britain in August 1814 he recommended Willshire to take over as British Vice Consul in Mogadore, a recommendation that was accepted by the Foreign Office in London. After his appointment he remained the Vice Consul in the city and the agent of the American Consul General in Tangier for Mogadore too, (there being no Americans in the town to accept the duties of vice consul), until he left Mogadore in 1844.

=== The redemption of Christian slaves ===
Part of the British Vice Consul's duties at Mogadore involved the redemption of British nationals (usually sailors) from slavery under the terms of an Anglo/Moroccan treaty. To secure a redemption, he employed as payment The Ironmongers' Fund, which was administered by The Worshipful Company of Ironmongers in London and set up in 1723 by one of its members, Thomas Betton, who himself had been enslaved in Barbary. Willshire was an intensely devout Anglican throughout his life, and upon arriving in Mogadore and learning of the desperate hardships suffered by enslaved, mostly European and American Christian sailors who had been wrecked on the Saharan coast, he resolved to work tirelessly to secure the freedom of as many as he was able, regardless of nationality. Barbary pirates took Europeans for ransom or slavery from passing ships or from coastal towns as far north as Iceland. The first Barbary war attempted to stop the practice, but this stoppage proved temporary; the second Barbary war finally stopped it. The US Marines hymn commemorates their involvement in the first Barbary war.

=== Captain James Riley ===
It was during one such redemption in 1815 that he first became aware of Captain James Riley. An American national, Riley's ship had been wrecked off the Western Sahara coast in August of that year, and he and his crew were enslaved. Willshire was approached by Riley's master Sidi Hamet with the purpose of ransoming Captain Riley and some of his crew. The ransom was completed successfully, with Riley and some of his crew delivered to Willshire. During Riley's convalescence at Willshire's house in Mogadore, the two became firm friends and later, business partners, forming a close relationship that lasted until Riley's death in 1840. Riley later went on to find fame with his published journal Sufferings in Africa, describing his experiences as a slave in the Moroccan Sahara. In thanks to William Willshire for the kindnesses he had received during his redemption and subsequent convalescence, Riley named his third son William Willshire Riley. When building a new town in Ohio, USA in 1822, Riley named it Willshire in his honour. The town today has 400 inhabitants.

=== Captain Alexander Scott ===
Shortly after the redemption of Riley and his crew, he also redeemed another notable enslaved Westerner, Captain Alexander Scott, who had survived captivity for 6 years, and who also wrote an account of his hardships for The New Monthly Magazine and Literary Journal in 1821.

Willshire was also recipient of many notes of thanks from organisations and individuals for his humanitarian work in Mogadore during his tenure as Vice Consul there, including in 1821 being elected honorary member of the Massachusetts Peace Society, receiving an award of $45 with the title.

== Life as a merchant in Mogadore ==
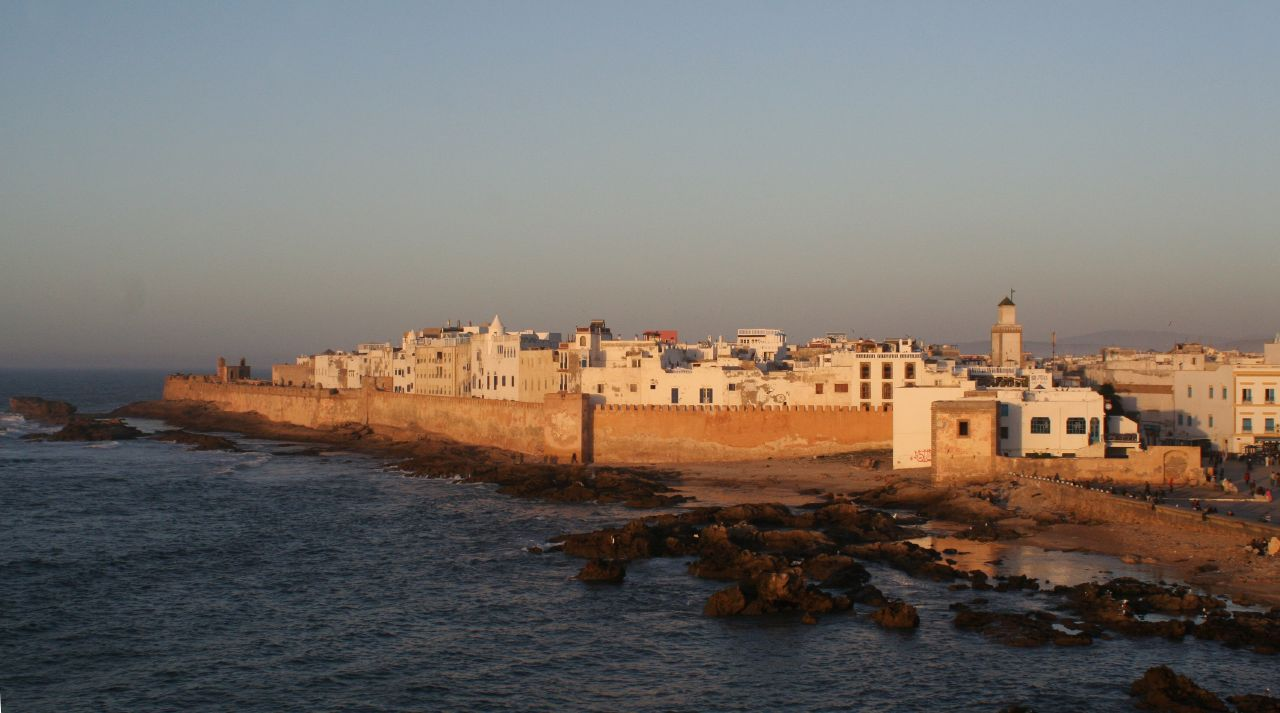
The walled Moroccan port city of Mogadore (Essaouira), where William Willshire spent most of his adult life

His position as Vice Consul in Mogadore never carried with it significant financial reward (between 1831 and 1845 his salary from the foreign office was just a £100 a year), but during the 1820s and 30s as Willshire's business interests flourished, his social and professional influence in Mogadore increased, along with his personal fortune.

Over time he began to play an important role in the various intrigues of the Moroccan elite and the foreign and Jewish merchants. For example, during the early 1830s he was conferred power of attorney in the long and complex bankruptcy dispute between the influential Moroccan based Anglo/Moroccan Jewish merchant house Macnin & Co and its several dozen London based creditors, in their attempt to recoup the company's £21,729 debt from its Moroccan based assets.

Upon the return of James Riley to Mogadore that same year, the pair struck up what was to be a highly lucrative business partnership, exporting goods to New York. Other activities that Willshire engaged in included drawing a sketch map of Southern Morocco for the Royal Geographical Society and writing a commentary on it in 1845.

=== Marriage and children ===
By 1832 Willshire had married and had a young family, two sons Leonard and Alexander, a daughter Sara and two small girls.

=== Audience with the Sultan ===
In late 1839, Willshire, along with his son Leonard and James Riley, were granted an audience with the Moroccan Sultan Mulay Abdir Ahman, where he received the blessings of the monarch. It was at this time that Riley persuaded Willshire that he ought to think about returning to Christian lands.

By 1840, with his fortune from his business interests amounting to some $200,000, he was ready to leave Mogadore, and through James Riley he bought a home in New York at a cost of $16,000. But soon after this, James Riley died at sea and Willshire abandoned his plan to move to America, his New York property being sold.

== Impoverishment and Consularship in Adrianople ==
=== The French attack Mogadore ===
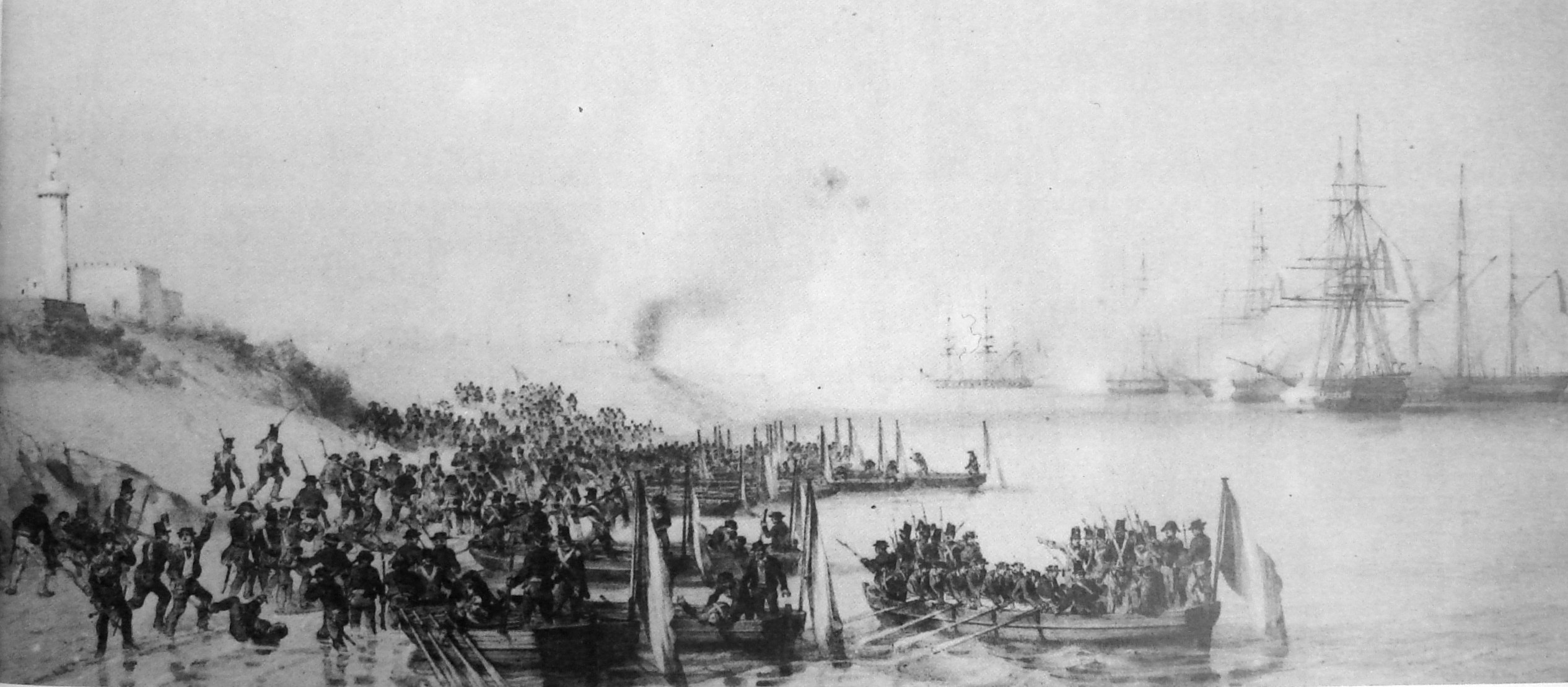
French troops disembarking at Mogador (Essaouira), 16 August 1844.

Willshire instead remained in Mogadore, and his business interests continued to flourish until an attack by the French fleet in 1844. As the most important foreigner in Mogadore, it came to Willshire to negotiate with the Moroccan governor on the evacuation of foreign nationals out of the city and onto waiting British ships. Despite securing the safe evacuation of most of the foreigners out of the city, due to a dispute over unpaid import duties with the Moroccan Sultans' officials in the town, Willshire and a number of other European merchants and their families were prevented from leaving the town and joining the British evacuation ships. The Europeans were able to shelter safely in Willshire's warehouse whilst the French started their bombardment, but when the Sultans' officials and troops fled Mogadore under the attack, local Arab desert tribesmen seized the opportunity and plundered the town for two days and nights. During the ransacking, all of Willshire's fortune and goods were looted, with Willshire and his family being manhandled and threatened in the process, his wife at one point having a scimitar held at her throat.

The families were eventually rescued by a French boat, and having been handed over to the British, the Willshires arrived in London on 4 September 1844 utterly destitute, with no home, no business, and no money. William Willshire was never able to return to Mogadore to reclaim his property.

The subsequent consolatory stance towards the belligerents by the British government prevented Willshire from claiming any compensation from the French and Moroccan governments, and Willshire was obliged to seek a new consular appointment.

=== Consularship of Adrianople ===
After initial refusals, the Foreign Office offered him the consulship of Adrianople (Edirne) following the previous consul's death.

The Willshire family's time in Adrianople was one of misery, disease, and poverty. On an initial salary of just £60, despite frequent requests for a raise, it was only occasionally granted. Even after a miserable five years, his wife contracting typhus, his children with frequent fevers, and Willshire himself having an operation on a cancerous growth, his constant requests for a transfer were always turned down flat. A typical response from Viscount Henry John Temple, 3rd Viscount Palmerston was simply "write larger and in a more upright hand".

Desperate "to end my banishment from civilised society", he volunteered to retire and return to Britain to live on his pension. The foreign office replied that his post did not entitle him to a pension, and that he could not be treated as a special case.

== Death ==
Eventually the Foreign Office decided that it did make financial sense to close the consulate in Adrianople and use the money saved to pay Willshire on his return to Britain, a pension of £100 a year. Palmerston proposed it and the Treasury agreed. They wrote to him on 18 August 1851 to let him know the good news.

A response sent from Adrianople informed Palmerston that William Willshire had died on 4 August.

An intensely religious man, during his lifetime William Willshire, despite receiving thanks from many quarters for his work in redeeming Western Christian sailors from a life of slavery, including a vote of thanks from the US Congress, didn't seek any accolades or recognition for his selfless and far-reaching humanitarian work, but James Riley's son described him as "an honour to his nation and an ornament to mankind".

Lincoln is quoted as saying that Riley's journal of his experiences in Africa, which might never have been written without Willshire's help to secure Riley's freedom, was one of the most important works in guiding his opinion on abolition in the United States.

== See also ==
- James Riley (Captain)
- Commerce
- History of Western Sahara
- History of Morocco
