= Joseph Dupuis =

British diplomat (1789–1874)

Joseph Dupuis (1789–1874) was a British diplomat active between 1811 and 1842, with various postings to the African Continent during that period, including one as vice-consul in Mogador and consul to the Asante Empire.

== Posting to Mogador ==
Part of the British Vice Consul's duties at Mogadore involved the redemption of British Nationals and other Christians (usually shipwrecked sailors) from slavery under the terms of an Anglo/Moroccan treaty. The British consul at Mogador was well known for paying high prices to free Christian slaves in North Africa. Upon learning of a wreck involving Christian sailors, Dupuis would send a Moroccan staff member to attempt to locate the crew, who were usually enslaved shortly after reaching shore, as Christian slaves were sought after by Moors and Africans alike. This employee of the consul would negotiate the terms of their redemption from their master, usually by paying for their freedom or trading for them. During his tenure as British vice-consul in Mogador, Dupuis secured the freedom of many Christian sailors from the hardships of slavery, and in many cases, death. This work was later carried out by his successor in the post.

Dupuis partnered a successful mercantile establishment that was engaged in trading between Mogador and Great Britain with William Willshire. When Dupuis returned to Britain in August 1814 he recommended Willshire to take over as British vice consul in Mogador, a recommendation that was accepted by the Foreign Office in London.

=== Involvement with Robert Adams ===
Not all Christians were ransomed shortly after their arrival in North Africa, and Dupuis is remembered for his liberation of the American Robert Adams after Adams suffered for three years as a Barbary captive. Upon making note of Adams in his historical record on October 6, 1813, Dupuis wrote that "Like most other Christians after a long captivity and severe treatment among the Arabs, he appeared on his first arrival exceedingly stupid and insensible; and he scarcely spoke to anyone." Adams remained with Dupuis in Mogador for seven months, during which time he was able to recover from the hardship of his life as a Barbary slave. Adams later ended up in London, where he told the full story of his experience as a Barbary slave in The Narrative of Robert Adams, published in 1816. Before Adams' Narrative was published, Dupuis fully corroborated all parts of the story where he was concerned. Dupuis was completely satisfied as to the veracity of Adams' Narrative and was one of Adams' strongest supporters when the book received criticism in Europe.

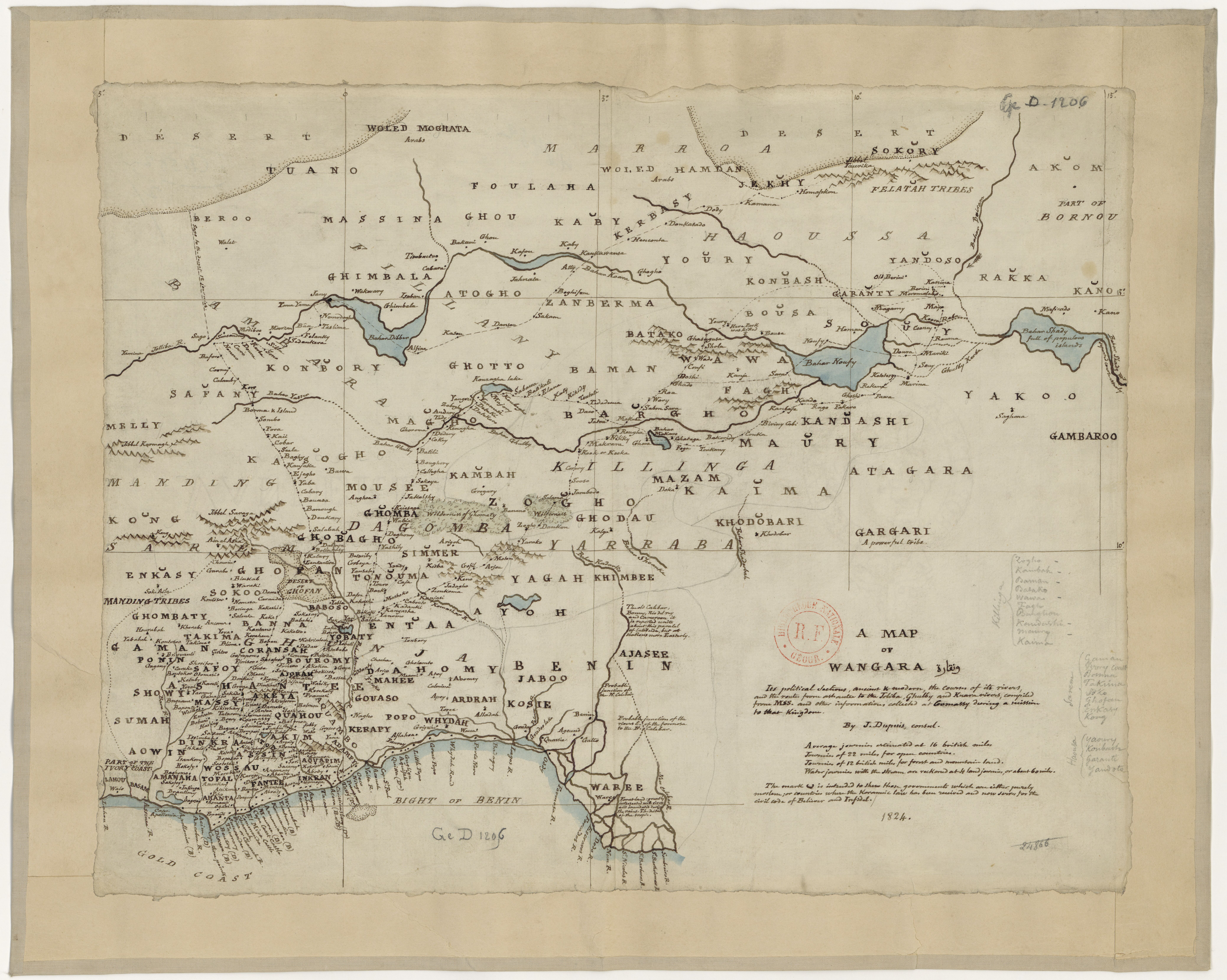
A Map of Wangara made by Dupuis based on information collected in Kumasi

== Trip to Kumasi ==
In 1820 Dupuis, serving as British consul, travelled to Kumasi to negotiate with the ruler of the Asante Empire. In addition to his diplomatic work, he made and recorded numerous observations about life in the city, its connections to the rest of the continent, and local perceptions of African geography.

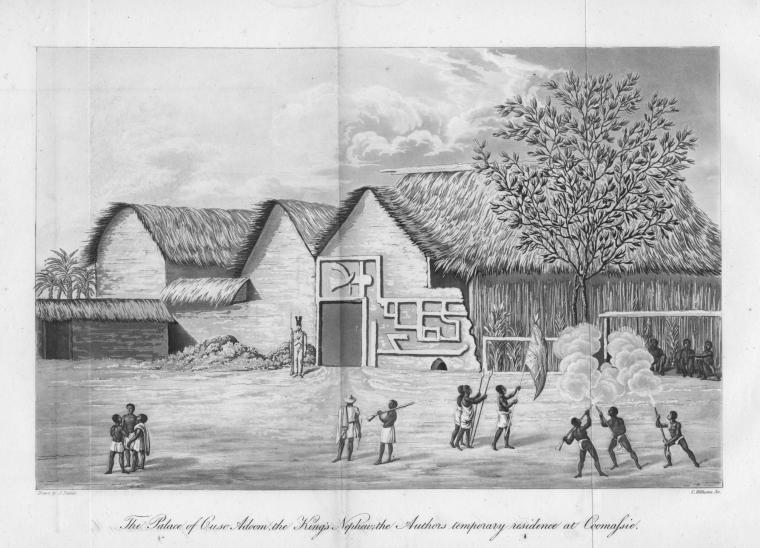
Temporary residence of Dupuis in Kumasi during his diplomatic mission .

== Personal life ==
Dupuis was married to Evelina Danby, who is generally accepted to be the illegitimate daughter of J. M. W. Turner and his mistress Sarah Danby (1766–1861). Together, they had seven children. Joseph Dupuis was a man of the highest reputation among his peers. He devoted much of his life to freeing Christian slaves in North Africa, and was regarded as one of the leading experts of his time on Morocco and the Sahara.

Dupuis left the Consular Service apparently under a cloud. Tradition says that he and his wife became involved in the marble trade in Greece. After the death of J. M. W. Turner they retired to England and Joseph applied unsuccessfully to be curator of Turner's gallery. They settled in Lambeth, where his brother's family lived. Earlier he had collaborated on a book on the Holy Places with his younger son. Both sons entered the Consular Service and had children.
