= Prophetic medicine =

Medical advice by Muhammad in the Hadith

In Islam, prophetic medicine (Arabic: الطب النبوي, 'al-Tibb al-nabawī) is the advice regarding sickness, treatment and hygiene based on reports of the Islamic prophet Muhammad as found in the hadith. The therapy involves diet, cupping, and cautery, and simple drugs (especially honey), numerous prayers and pious invocations for the patient to perform, but no surgery. Maladies discussed include fevers, plague, leprosy, poisonous bites, protection from night-flying insects and the evil eye, rules for coitus, theories of embryology, etc. The authors of its manuals were religious clerics who collected and explicated these traditions, not physicians, and it is usually practiced by non-physicians. How much of the medicine is divine revelation and how much folk practices inherited from ancestors (and thus time-sensitive, culturally situated, rather than eternal medical truths) is disputed. (There is also a non-hadith based traditional medicine of early Arabs, known as Unani medicine.)

Prophetic medicine is distinct from Islamic medicine, which is a broader category encompassing a variety of medical practices rooted in Greek natural philosophy, (which are distinct from hadith-based Prophetic medicine). This body of knowledge was fully articulated only in the 14th century, at which point it was concerned with reconciling Sunnah (traditions) with the foundations of the Galenic humoral theory that was prevalent at the time in the medical institutions of the Islamicate world. It is nonetheless a tradition with continued modern relevance to this day, when it is said to be "gaining popularity as a reflection" of Muslims' love of their Prophet.

== Background ==
Medieval interpretations of the hadith were produced in a Galenic medical context, while modern-day versions of prophetic medicine treatments may include recent research findings to frame the importance of the genre.

The Abu Dawood hadith,

Make use of medical treatment, for Allah has not made a disease without appointing a remedy for it, with the exception of one disease, namely death.

— Abu Dawood, Sunan Abu Dawood

is thought by some to indicate that Muhammad's belief in the importance of medical research to seek out cures for diseases known to Muslims.

== Recommendations ==
In hadith, Muhammad recommended the use of practices such as honey and hijama (wet cupping) for healing. He generally opposed the use of cauterization for causing "pain and menace to a patient". Other items with beneficial effects attributed to Muhammad, and standard features on traditional medicine in the Islamicate world, include olive oil; dates; miswak as a necessity for oral health and Nigella sativa or "black seed" or "black cumin" and its oils. These items are still sold in Islamic centers or sellers of other Islamic goods.

=== Black seeds ===
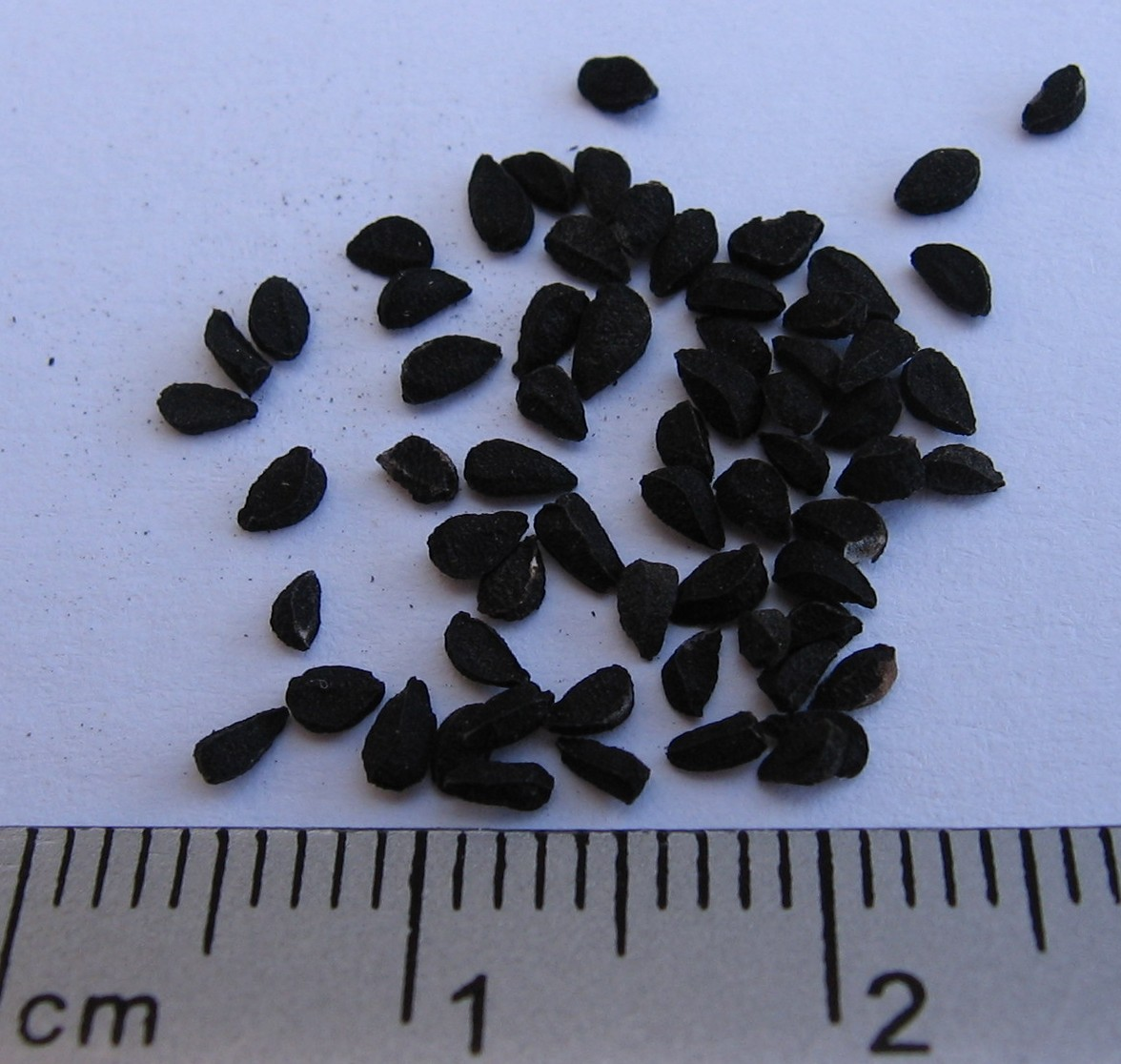
Nigella sativa seeds

Abu Hurayra quoted Muhammad saying: "Utilize the black seed for without a doubt, it is a cure for all sicknesses aside from death." (Hadith Al-Bukhari 7:591)

=== Camel urine and milk ===
According to a hadith recorded in the 4th chapter (Wudu') of Sahih al-Bukhari, Muhammad had used camel urine to treat people:

Some people of` Ukl or `Uraina tribe came to Medina and its climate did not suit them. So the Prophet ordered them to go to the herd of (Milch) camels and to drink their urine and milk. So they went as directed and after they became healthy, they killed the shepherd of the Prophet and drove away all the camels.

The event has also been recorded in Sahih Muslim, History of the Prophets and Kings and Kitāb aṭ-ṭabaqāt al-kabīr.

=== Henna ===
According to Hadith compiler Abu Dawood's work Sunan Abu Dawood, Muhammad had advised the application of henna in case of leg pain:

Narrated by Salmah, the maid-servant of the Prophet, said: No one complained to the Prophet of a headache but he told him to get himself cupped, or of a pain in his legs but he told him to dye them with henna.

— Abi Dawud Book 28, Hadith 3849

In Ibn Majah's Sunan ibn Majah, Muhammad has been described as using henna for external injuries:

Salma Umm Rafi', the freed slave woman of the Prophet, said: "The Prophet did not suffer any injury or thorn- prick but he would apply henna to it"

— Ibn Majah Vol. 4, Book 31, Hadith 3502

=== Honey ===
The value of honey is traced to specific mention of its virtues in the Quran, an-Nahl (the Bees) and not just Muhammad. (Quran 68–69)

Muhammad is quoted as, "Healing is in three things: cupping, a gulp of honey or cauterization, (branding with fire) but I forbid my followers to use cauterization (branding with fire)."

=== Truffles ===
Truffles have been cited within multiple hadiths for eye medicine. Muhammad refers to them as 'manna' in many of these hadiths. The word Manna means a form of sustenance granted by a divine source; this is often referred to in the context of the food the Israelites received in the Hebrew Bible.

"Truffles are 'Manna' which Allah, the Exalted the Majestic, sent to the people of Israil, and its juice is a medicine for the eye"

=== House flies ===
The Prophet said, "If a house fly falls in the drink of anyone of you, he should dip it (in the drink) and take it out, for one of its wings has a disease and the other has the cure for the disease."

— Muhammad al-Bukhari, Sahih Bukhari

== Works ==
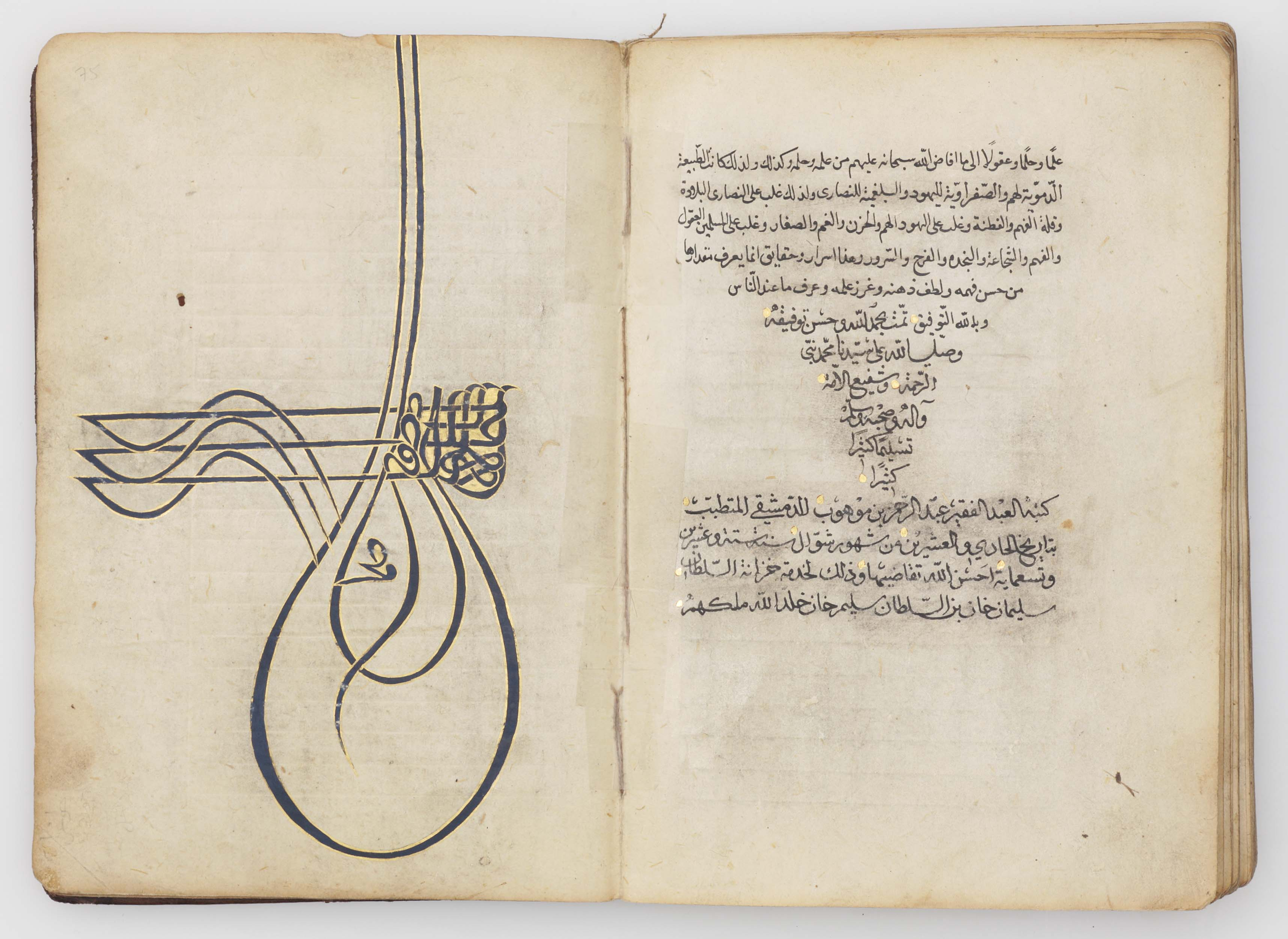
16th century manuscript of Al-Tibb al-Nabawi created for Ottoman emperor Suleiman the Magnificent, bearing his tughra (left)

While the prominent works focused on treatment of the hadith related to health date from several centuries A.H., Sahih al-Bukhari and other earlier collections included these as well. 'Abd Allah b. Bustâm al-Nîsâbûrî's Tlbb al-a'imma, aggregating a legacy of several Shi'ite Imams, is widely considered to be the first known treatise on prophetic medicine, although it is rooted in a somewhat different cosmology. Book 76 of the canonical al-Bukhari corpus is entitled "Medicine" and includes over 100 traditions, 76 loosely related to medicine, covering topics ranging from precautions against leprosy and epidemics to the forbidding of alcohol and suicide.

Ibn Qayyim Al-Jawziyya in the 13th century produced one of the most influential works about prophetic medicine in his 277-chapter book, Al-Tibb al-Nabawiyy. Al-Jawziyya deals with a diversity of treatments as recommended by Muhammad but also engages with ethical concerns, discussing malpractice and the hallmarks of the competent doctor. Ethics of medical practice continue to be an important marker of Islamic medicine for some. Al-Jawziyya also elaborates on the relationship between medicine and religion.

A theologian renowned for his exegetical endeavors, Al-Suyuti also composed two works on prophetic medicine, one of which was on sexual relations as ordered by Muhammad. Al-Suyuti's other manuscript divides medicine into three types: traditional, spiritual and preventive (e.g. dietary regimen and exercise). Along with Al-Jawziyya, Al-Suyuti also included commentary that spoke to dealing with contagion and thus was relevant to the Black Death in the Islamic world. Ibn al-Khatib also addressed the Black Death and his belief in the contradiction between hadith and science regarding plagues, which may have led to his execution by strangulation for "heresy", although the court dealing with the case never reached a conclusive statement, and the event was recorded to have been largely influenced by the enemies of Ibn al-Khatib.

Both of the works above also address bioethical issues of abortion and conception, issues that, like the idea of Islamic medical heritage as being holistic, continue to be important in constructions of modern Islamic identity. Other notable works include those of Ibn Tulun (d. AD 1546) and Al-Dhahabi (d. AD 1348).

== Contemporary practice ==
=== Islamic Republic of Iran ===
Some clerics in Iran promote a controversial form of prophetic or "Islamic" medicine, based on sometimes rather unlikely quotations attributed to historic Muslim religious figures, and on Iranian traditional medicine.

Abbas Tabrizian, a prominent proponent, has faced official action for selling unapproved treatments; he has been widely criticized, and it thought to have few supporters. His burning of a copy of "Harrison's Principles of Internal Medicine", a medical reference book, was condemned by Grand Ayatollah Jafar Sobhani, who said that

"insulting medical learning is against the spirit of Islam and Islam's call for [learning] science... Criticizing the content [of a book] is appropriate, but burning is an act of ignorance, and many libraries were set on fire based on wrong motivations in the past".

Ayatollah Alireza Arafi, who runs Iran's seminaries, also condemned the book-burning. Abbas Tabrizian was widely ridiculed for a suggestion that COVID-19 could be prevented by applying a cotton ball soaked in violet oil to the anus. The IRNA news agency reported that Abbas Tabrizian, who has often promoted his remedies as "Islamic medicine" in opposition to standard medicine, has also claimed that COVID-19 is God's revenge against those who had bothered him.

An arrest warrant has been issued for Morteza Kohansal, a follower of Abbas Tabrizian who visited the coronavirus section of a hospital in Iran without wearing protective gear, and applied an unknown substance he described as "Prophet's Perfume" to patients.

Using "Islamic medicine" has caused some Iranian clerics to delay getting standard medical treatment. Ayatollah Hashem Bathaie Golpayegani announced that he had been infected by COVID-19, but had cured himself, three weeks before being hospitalized. He died two days later. Ayatollah Haeri-Shirazi and Ayatollah Mahmoud Hashemi Shahroudi were both also said by their families to have long delayed seeking standard medical, using "Islamic medicine" instead. Ayatollah Hashemi Shahroudi, who had been considered a possible successor Supreme Leader of Iran, died of cancer. His son Ala Shahroudi later said that "The so-called Islamic doctors had convinced my father to ignore what modern physicians said about his illness and how to treat it... My father underwent surgery in 2017. Supreme Leader, Ayatollah Ali Khamenei, secretly visited and advised him to ignore what the Islamic doctors say, and listen to the modern-day physicians... Nevertheless, my father ignored the leader's recommendation, and continued to trust the so-called Islamic Medicine experts."

== See also ==
- Challenge of the Quran
- Commission on Scientific Signs in the Quran and Sunnah
- Islamic attitudes towards science
- Islamic views on evolution
- Islamic view of miracles
- Kohl
- Medical Encyclopedia of Islam and Iran
- Miracles of Muhammad
- Muhammad ibn Zakariya al-Razi
- Quran and miracles
- Traditional Chinese medicine
- Shamanism
- Witch doctor
