= Commerce (1815 ship) =

American merchant sailing ship

Coordinates: 26.133°N 14.500°W

Commerce was a Connecticut-based American merchant sailing ship that ran aground on 28 August 1815 at Cape Bojador, off the coast of Morocco. Far more famous than the ship itself is the story of the crew who survived the shipwreck, who went on to become slaves of local tribes who captured them.

Commerce, sailing from Gibraltar to Cape Verde, was under the command of American Captain James Riley and crewed by 11 others. Most were Americans. After sailing for several days in dense fog, the ship ran aground on a reef near Cape Bojador. After being attacked and ransacked on shore by Sahrawi natives, who killed one of the seamen in cold blood, the crew returned to their rowboat and attempted to reach the Cape Verde Islands or hoped to meet another passing ship. This proved impossible, as their meager provisions were running out, and they decided to return to shore and take their chances with the local tribes. Landing some 300 miles further south down the coast, near Cape Barbas, less than one hundred miles north of Cape Blanco, they were taken captive by nomads of the Oulad Bou Sbaa tribe. The survivors were eventually rescued thanks to James Simpson, the American consul at Tangier, and William Willshire, British Vice Consul to Mogadore (Essaouira), Morocco. Morocco had been the first country to recognize the United States and attempted to maintain generally friendly relations despite the behavior of pirates and raiders within their borders.

The survivors' story of extreme dehydration, severe starvation, and ever-present brutality while roaming the Sahara desert with their captors became a published story, first in the 1820s in retelling by Captain Riley himself, then by Archibald Robbins, a member of his crew, and then in the 2004 account Skeletons on the Zahara: A True Story of Survival by American writer Dean King. The original Authentic Narrative of the Loss of the American Brig Commerce by the "Late Master and Supercargo James Riley is quoted by Abraham Lincoln as one of the six most influential books he read in his youth and was republished as Sufferings in Africa.
