= Willshire, Ohio =

- Village
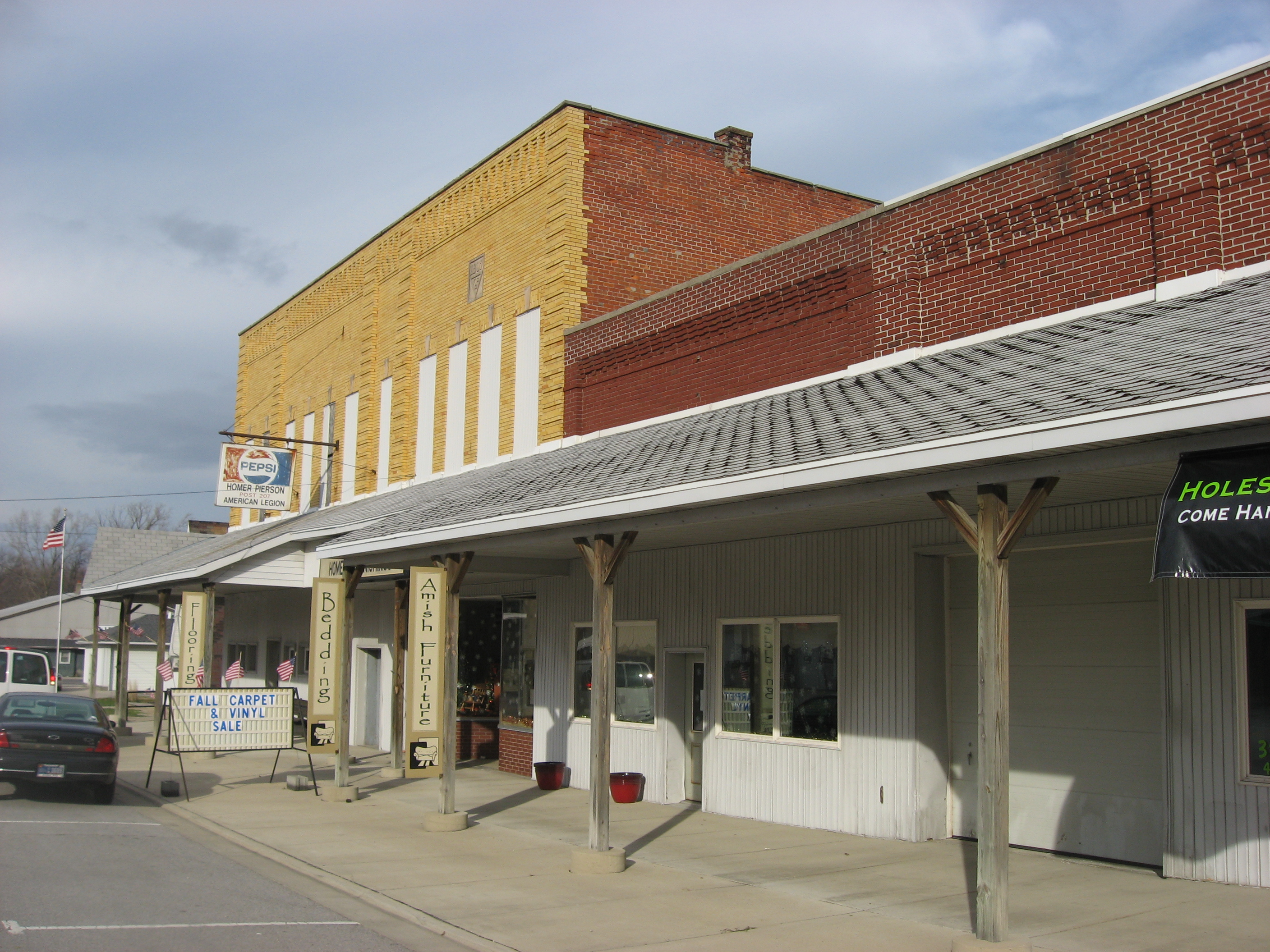
- Businesses in Willshire's downtown

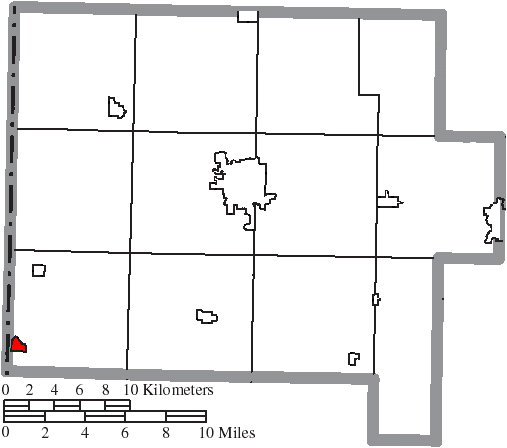
- Location of Willshire in Van Wert County

- Location within the state of Ohio Willshire, Ohio (the United States)
- Coordinates: 40°44′52″N 84°47′34″W
- Country: United States
- State: Ohio
- County: Van Wert
- Township: Willshire

Area
  - Total: 0.36 sq mi (0.92 km^{2})
  - Land: 0.35 sq mi (0.91 km^{2})
  - Water: 0 sq mi (0.00 km^{2})
- Elevation: 801 ft (244 m)

Population (2020)
  - Total: 405
  - Density: 1,147.3/sq mi (442.99/km^{2})
- Time zone: UTC-5 (Eastern (EST))
  - Summer (DST): UTC-4 (EDT)
- ZIP code: 45898
- Area code: 419
- GNIS feature ID: 2399703

Willshire is a village in Van Wert County, Ohio, United States. The population was 405 at the 2020 census. It is included within the Van Wert, Ohio Micropolitan Statistical Area.

Willshire is located 0.5 mi (0.8 km) from the Ohio/Indiana State line. St. Mary's River flows along the east edge of village.

== History ==
Willshire was founded by Captain James Riley in 1822, and is named for the English man who saved him while he was a captive in Africa, William Willshire. A post office has been in operation at Willshire since 1822. Willshire served as the first county seat for Van Wert County.

== Geography ==
According to the United States Census Bureau, the village has a total area of 0.37 square miles (0.96 km^{2}), all land.

== Demographics ==
Historical population
Census	Pop.	Note	%±
1850	147		—
1860	131		−10.9%
1870	268		104.6%
1880	508		89.6%
1890	566		11.4%
1900	560		−1.1%
1910	653		16.6%
1920	546		−16.4%
1930	506		−7.3%
1940	513		1.4%
1950	567		10.5%
1960	601		6.0%
1970	623		3.7%
1980	564		−9.5%
1990	541		−4.1%
2000	463		−14.4%
2010	397		−14.3%
2020	405		2.0%
U.S. Decennial Census

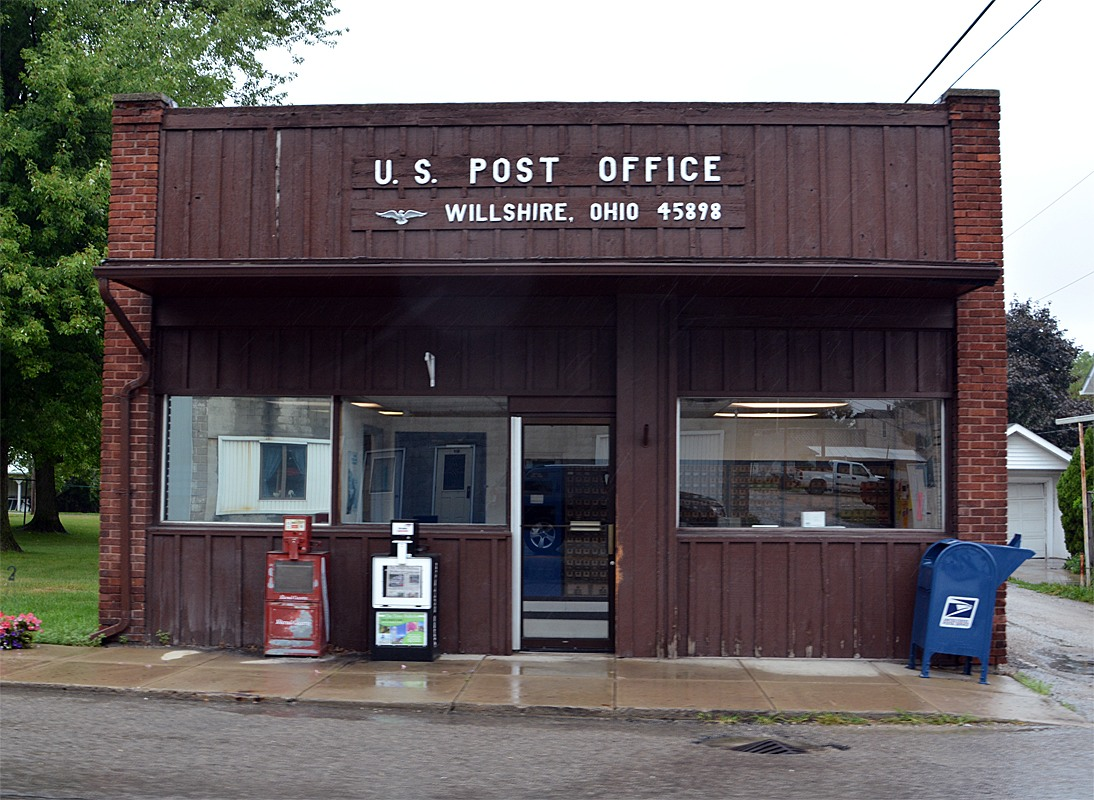
Willshire post office

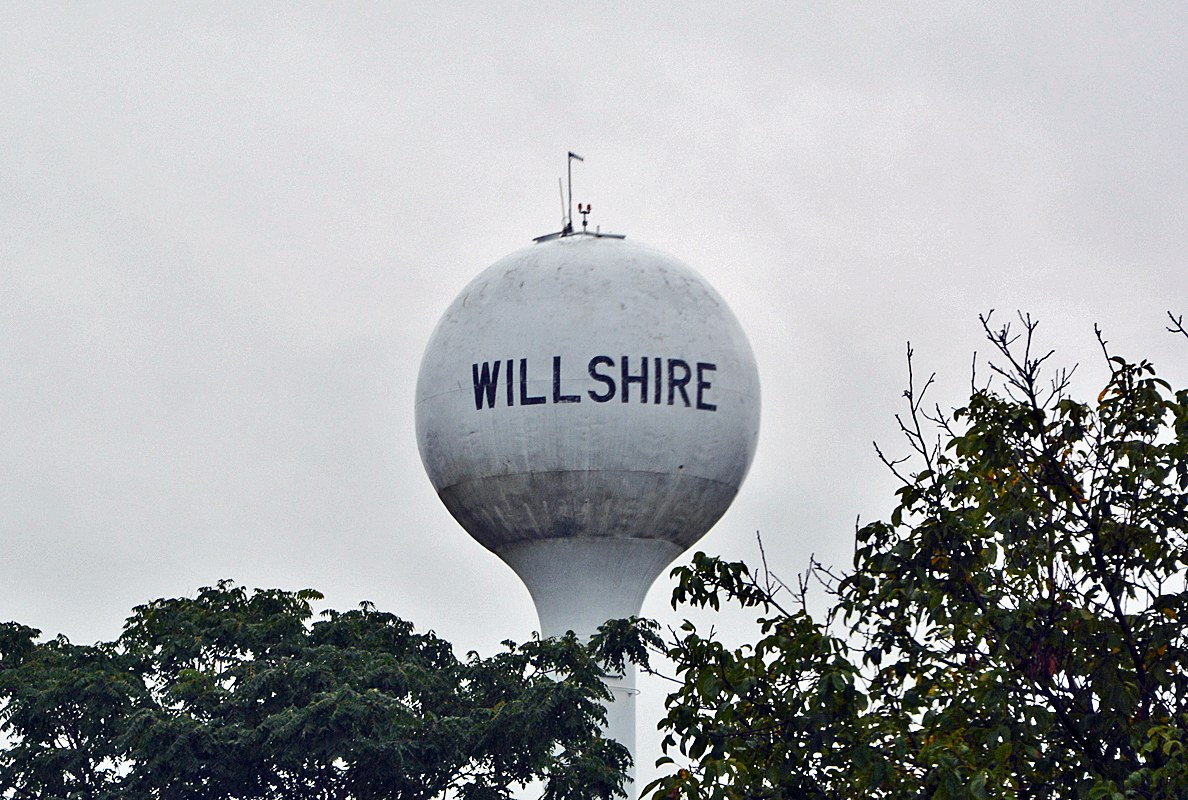
Willshire water tower

=== 2010 census ===
As of the census of 2010, there were 397 people, 162 households, and 109 families living in the village. The population density was 1,073.0 inhabitants per square mile (414.3/km^{2}). There were 199 housing units at an average density of 537.8 per square mile (207.6/km^{2}). The racial makeup of the village was 97.7% White, 1.0% African American, 0.5% Native American, 0.3% Pacific Islander, and 0.5% from two or more races. Hispanic or Latino of any race were 0.8% of the population.

There were 162 households, of which 28.4% had children under the age of 18 living with them, 53.1% were married couples living together, 9.3% had a female householder with no husband present, 4.9% had a male householder with no wife present, and 32.7% were non-families. 29.6% of all households were made up of individuals, and 10.5% had someone living alone who was 65 years of age or older. The average household size was 2.45 and the average family size was 3.06.

The median age in the village was 41.1 years. 25.2% of residents were under the age of 18; 5.8% were between the ages of 18 and 24; 23.9% were from 25 to 44; 27% were from 45 to 64; and 18.1% were 65 years of age or older. The gender makeup of the village was 49.6% male and 50.4% female.

=== 2000 census ===
As of the census of 2000, there were 463 people, 192 households, and 124 families living in the village. The population density was 1,221.1 inhabitants per square mile (471.5/km^{2}). There were 207 housing units at an average density of 545.9 per square mile (210.8/km^{2}). The racial makeup of the village was 98.92% White, 0.22% Asian, 0.22% from other races, and 0.65% from two or more races. Hispanic or Latino of any race were 0.65% of the population.

There were 192 households, out of which 30.2% had children under the age of 18 living with them, 52.6% were married couples living together, 9.4% had a female householder with no husband present, and 34.9% were non-families. 30.2% of all households were made up of individuals, and 11.5% had someone living alone who was 65 years of age or older. The average household size was 2.41 and the average family size was 3.02.

In the village, the population was spread out, with 25.1% under the age of 18, 7.6% from 18 to 24, 32.8% from 25 to 44, 20.7% from 45 to 64, and 13.8% who were 65 years of age or older. The median age was 36 years. For every 100 females there were 106.7 males. For every 100 females age 18 and over, there were 104.1 males.

The median income for a household in the village was $40,625, and the median income for a family was $50,536. Males had a median income of $31,818 versus $23,281 for females. The per capita income for the village was $18,425. About 4.9% of families and 5.9% of the population were below the poverty line, including 10.1% of those under age 18 and 3.7% of those age 65 or over.

== Education ==
Parkway Local Schools in Rockford, Ohio.

Willshire has a public library, a branch of the Brumback Library.
