= Robert Adams (sailor) =

American travel writer

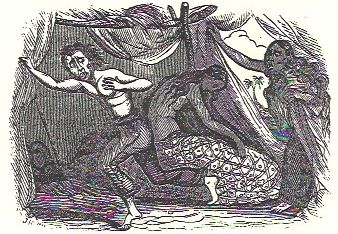

Robert Adams (born c. 1790) was a twenty-five-old American sailor who claimed to be enslaved in North Africa for three years, from 1810 to 1814. During this time, he claimed to have visited Timbuktu, which would have made him the first Westerner to reach the city, though his narrative is dubious. Upon his stated liberation and return to Europe, Adams' story was published in two heavily edited and divergent accounts, most notably The Narrative of Robert Adams in 1816.

Because his story was sanctioned by some of the most distinguished men in England, including members of government, who had a noted financial interest in Africa, his narrative(s) gained credibility despite "its most glaring absurdities."

Widely cited as an example of white slavery, today, both accounts are widely known to have been fabrications, lending to the dismissal of Adam's story within general history discussions and recordings.

== Early life ==
Robert Adams was an American of mixed black and white ancestry. It was written that he was "born up the river of New York, where his father lived when he quitted America;" and that his mother was a Mulatto. However, there is no record of a man under his known aliases or fitting his general description in Hudson during this period. Joseph Dupuis, the British Consul in Mogador who eventually ransomed Adams, wrote of Adams' appearance:

"The appearance, features, and dress of this man...so perfectly resembled those of an Arab, or rather a Shilluh, his head being shaved and his beard being scanty and black, that I had difficulty at first in believing him to be a Christian."

Dupuis wrote that Adams left America to avoid being prosecuted for refusing to legitimize his relationship with a young woman. However, nothing else is known of his early life until 1810 when, under the name "Benjamin Rose," he signed onto the ship Charles as a merchant seaman. While he used the name "Benjamin Rose" leading up to his time on the Charles, he exclusively went by the name "Robert Adams" after his release from slavery. It is unknown which of these names was his real one, though, at the time, it was not uncommon for sailors, especially "distressed seamen", to change their names.

== Adventure ==
=== Shipwreck ===
As Adams recounts in his Narrative, the ship sailed from New York City on June 17, 1810 (or May 7, 1810, as he recounted in Cádiz), led by captain John Horton. The ship, carrying flour, rice, and salted provisions, was bound for Gibraltar.

Along with Adams, the crew included Stephen Dolbie (mate), Thomas Williams, Martin Clarke, Unis Newsham, Nicholas (a Swede), John Stephens, John Matthews, and James Davison.

Adams stated that, after 26 days, the ship arrived at Gibraltar, where the cargo was discharged. There, the crew added another crewman, Unis Nelson. According to Adams, the ship sat in Gibraltar for about a month and proceeded after Captain Horton decided to go to the Isle of May for salt. However, it soon became clear that the captain was going on a trading voyage down the coast instead.

After three weeks at sea, Adams said he overheard two older crew members, Newsham and Matthews, who had been on the coast before, state that the captain was lost. For eight or nine days after that, the ships fought heavy winds until, on October 11, around 3:00 am, the ship struck some reef in Cape Blanco, about four hundred miles north of Senegal. Despite two crew members being unable to swim, there were no deaths.

=== Life as a slave ===
As day broke, Adams claims the entire crew was surrounded by a group of about 35 Moors, who imprisoned them. Luckily, the Moors also had an imprisoned Frenchman who was able to communicate with Captain Horton, who also spoke French. The crew, according to Adams, was stripped naked and forced to dig holes in the sand to sleep, so they could keep cool.

Adams claimed that Captain Horton fell ill and was killed with a sword by the Moors, who were frustrated that they could not communicate with him despite having the Frenchman as a translator. Robert Adams said that, across three years of being enslaved in northern Africa, he passed through the hands of at least five different owners.

His first owners were the Moors, who captured the shipwrecked sailors of the Charles. After about 12 days, Adams said that the Moors divided the prisoners among themselves, with Adams and Newsham being assigned to about twenty Moors who traveled on foot, with four camels. He said they traveled southwest, crossing the desert at an estimated rate of 15–20 miles a day, under great hardship, with scarcity of food and water. He claimed they were often forced to drink a mix of water and camel urine to stay alive in the arid conditions.

At one point in the journey, Stevens says that his group of Moors was overtaken by a larger group of black Africans, who took the Moors and the enslaved people as prisoners, including Adams. They again traveled great distances, first to the Africans' village. According to Adams' account, he and an enslaved Portuguese, 18-year-old John Stevens, were taken to Timbuktu around July 1812. Adams never provides any parameters for Stevens' captivity but expresses that they were treated as honored guests of the king rather than as enslaved people and were free to move about as they pleased within the city. They were considered an exotic oddity by the locals, and Adams later recounts that people used to come from far-off lands to stare at them.

Eventually, Adams' stay as a guest ended, and he was traded to a group of Moors who sold tobacco. Several days after making their trade, Adams set off farther east and eventually north with his third group of captors. Adams suffered his second great desert crossing, once again drinking camel urine to survive and avoid dehydration. Eventually, the Moors reached a village of tents, where Adams was put to work for several months tending goats and sheep. At some point during this phase of his enslavement, Adams' master had promised to take him to Mogador and trade him to the British consul, thus helping him attain freedom. However, his master later went back on his word, and Adams rebelled as a result, refusing to care for the animals. This angered his master, who later sold him to someone else.

Adams stated that his fourth master was a man with two wives. Adams was given to one of the wives as her personal slave. The second wife later enlisted Adams' assistance to care for her goats. In payment, she allowed Adams to "rest" in her tent. This relationship continued for months, and upon his master's knowledge of the affair, Adams was traded for blankets and dates.

His fifth master took him farther north to a village settlement where he met other Westerners, including some of his former companions from the Charles. One of the white men had already renounced his Christian faith to attain freedom and, shortly after, two of his sailing companions from the Charles also renounced their faith. Not long after, the British consul, Joseph Dupuis, ransomed Adams, thus securing his freedom.

=== Freedom ===
After trading for Adams, the British consul Dupuis took him first to Agadir, then to Mogador, where Adams stayed for nearly seven months. He first appeared in the historical record here, with the date October 6, 1813. He was sent north to Tangier to the American Consul-General, James Simpson.

After this, Adams sailed to Cádiz, Spain, where he hoped to connect with a ship headed for the United States. Unfortunately, he arrived two days late. He recounted his story to the American Samuel A. Storrow, who published this "Cadiz Narrative" in 1817.

Subsequently, Adams went to Gibraltar, where he was able to travel by ship to Holyhead on the Isle of Anglesey, Wales. Adams later ended up in London, where he survived as a beggar.

In November 1815, Adams was sought out by Simon Cock of the Company of Merchants Trading to Africa, who had been led to him by a traveler who recognized Adams from Cádiz. Intrigued by the prospect of speaking to someone who had been to Timbuktu, Cock brought Adams to the company's office. There, Adams agreed to recount his story in exchange for finances and security to travel home to New York. Cock and company questioned Adams and assembled a narrative of this account; it was published as The Narrative of Robert Adams in 1816.

== Narratives ==
Two versions of Adams' story were published. The Company of Merchants Trading to Africa (the African Company) published the first version based on interviews held with Adams at their London offices. This version was titled The Narrative of Robert Adams and included an introduction, notes, and other supporting material. Simon Cock was its primary editor, and Joseph Dupuis added notes based on his encounter with Adams. The book was published by John Murray in 1816. The Narrative is reminiscent of Barbary slave narratives, which were written by other shipwrecked sailors who had been taken captive and enslaved in Northern Africa (Barbary corsairs did not capture him, and he spent his captivity in the Sub-Saharan region south of the Barbary coast). The one notable difference in the Narrative of Robert Adams is that Adams describes his visit to the legendary city of Timbuktu, much coveted by Europeans then. Adams was the first Westerner ever to give a complete account of Timbuktu. As Frank T. Kryza writes, "No European explorer had been there and returned since the Middle Ages."

According to Cock's introduction to the Narrative, Adams sailed home in December 1815, omitting much of his payment, as well as his royalties from the book, but promising to return in the spring. Due to the dangerous nature of trans-Atlantic crossings in the winter, he gave Cock the "particulars of his family" to verify claims on his earnings. However, the Company of Merchants Trading to Africa's records do not show any money was ever paid to, or held for, Adams or his family. From this point, Adams vanishes from the historical record.

The second version, known as the "Cadiz Narrative", was written up by Samuel A. Storrow, a "gentleman of Boston" whom Adams met in Cádiz. This version was published as "Interiour of Africa" in the North American Review in May 1817, with an introductory note from editor Jared Sparks. In July 1817, Sparks reviewed the African Company's version, noting the discrepancies between the Cádiz account and the London version and calling Adams' tale a "fiction."

== Significance ==
The legends of the gold of Timbuktu spread after Mansa Musa, King of the Empire of Mali, set out in the year 1324 on a hajj, or journey to Mecca, showering gold on everyone he met. Ibn Battuta, a famed Moroccan traveler, visited Mali for several months from 1352 to 1353 and confirmed that there was abundant gold in the kingdom. These accounts spread throughout Africa and Europe, with many European countries coveting gold from the Malian city. The only people not looking for Timbuktu were the Americans because the United States was such a young country then.

At the time, Timbuktu was a major center of trading, focusing on salt, books, and gold, which were all very in demand at the time. Goods coming from the Mediterranean shores and salt from Tegaza in the north were traded in Timbuktu for gold, which came from the immense gold mines of the Boure and Banbuk. The city's prosperity attracted black African and Arab scholars, merchants, and traders from North Africa. The fact that the city was a major center for trading goods for gold only increased its fame, and this very trade made the city enormously wealthy.

The following explorers attempted many failed expeditions to the remote city of Timbuktu: the American John Ledyard, the Englishman Simon Lucas, the Irishman Major Daniel Houghton, the Scotsman Mungo Park, the German Frederick Hornemann, an Englishman named Nicholls, and the Swiss explorer Johann Ludwig Burckhardt. They all failed in one way or another, primarily by disappearing in the middle of the expedition or dying before reaching the city. Most did not return home.

Robert Adams' tale of his visit to Timbuktu was highly significant for two reasons: (1) it is a tale of a Westerner finally managing to arrive at the famed city, long coveted for its supposed wealth and extensive reserves of gold, and (2) because he was said to have arrived there by accident, and not through an organized exploration.

Despite the controversy regarding the veracity of Adams' story, publishing his Narrative was deemed a triumph for British science and exploration. Though Adams was said to have been an American, his tale was told in England, and it was there that the Narrative was published, granting an international victory to England.

In contemporary times, Adams' tale is often cited as an example of white slavery. However, given that he was stated to be a mulatto in his tale, given that there is no record accounting for him or his family on either side of the Atlantic, and due to numerous other discrepancies in his tale, his story is accepted as having been fabricated.

== Controversy ==
Adams's account does not match what is now known of Timbuktu and is regarded as a probable fabrication.

No trace of either Adams or his family has ever been found. No family of his name was known in the Hudson, nor had Adams ever been heard of in the area. In addition, the collector of New York, who certified ships, verified that no vessel resembling Adams' description of the Charles had ever left his stated port.

Lending to doubts in Adams' story was also that he had no firm national, racial, personal, language, or name identity, allowing him to pass through his own story unnoticed. For example, he was both "Robert Adams" and "Benjamin Rose," and he spoke English, Arabic, and "Negro." There are also various noted holes in Adams' story. For example, there is no reason why he was allowed to roam Timbuktu freely for six months. It is also noted that Adams was induced, by Simon Cock, to answer questions about the region that had stumped Europeans for generations. He had an answer to every question the Europeans asked him.

Raising more doubt is the manner in which Cock "found" Adams, a then destitute beggar, wandering the streets of London in 1815, and how an illiterate person, who learned nothing from books, knew the exact number of days of his journeys, the precise number of miles he traveled each day, and the precise directions of all his travels on foot. It is notable that it was a well-established fact that no wrecks occurred south of Cape Bajado at that time. Adams' illiteracy is at odds with the fact that sailors were substantially literate during this period.

Also lending doubt to Adams' story is the "artlessness," considered necessary for poor storytellers, often giving them a sense of truth. Michel de Certeau wrote of such narratives when he linked the history of writing history to the legitimization of political power, a practice found in "Western" cultures, which used the act of writing as a tool of colonialism; writing histories while minimizing or eradicating the traditions of native peoples. For example, Dick said of Adams:

"In Adams we find an individual relating travels and adventures, which are indeed singular and extraordinary, but are told with the utmost simplicity and bear strong internal marks of truth. Placed in a wide and untravelled region, where a mere narrator of fables might easily persuade himself that no one would trace or detect him, we find Adams resisting the temptation (no slight one for an ignorant sailor) of exciting the wonder of the credulous, or the sympathy of the compassionate, by filling his story with miraculous adventures, or overcharged pictures of suffering. In speaking of himself he assumes no undue degree of importance. He is rather subordinate to the circumstances of the story, than himself the prominent feature of it; and almost every part of his Narrative is strictly in nature, and unpretending."

Critics paint Adams as a "found narrator" who is not only unable to narrate a "continuous and straight-forward story" but who also could only answer questions put to him, first by Dupuis in 1810 in Africa, and then in 1815–16 in London, meaning the editors constructed his "story" from fragments. This, argues critics, was done to the point in which Cock brought in a group of "scientific and respectable gentlemen" to interview Adams to verify details and geographical descriptions of Africa.

Adams' story was deemed fabricated, to the point that it was denounced in the North American Review in 1817, which delivered its critique only after assessing both narratives. The critique stated:

"In our last number we published a notice of this book, to gether with a similar narrative, which was taken at Cádiz several months previously to this, expressing at the same time our suspicion, that the whole of that part, which related to the interiour, and particularly to the city of Tombuctoo, was a fabrication. We propose now to examine the subject more at large, and to bring forward such reasons as have in duced us from the beginning to regard the story as a fiction, and a gross attempt to impose on the credulity of the publick. To us, indeed, this has appeared so obvious, that we should not think it worthy of any serious examination, had it not excited so much interest, and gained universal belief in England...We have not time to pursue Adams through all the im probabilities, inconsistencies, and contradictions of his story. We have mentioned some of the more important only, and such as could not possibly arise from defect of memory or observation..."

Despite its discrepancies, it is surmised that Adams' story found an audience due to "sympathy and curiosity of Africa" at the time."

== See also ==
- James Riley (captain)
