= African Association =

British club dedicated to the exploration of West Africa

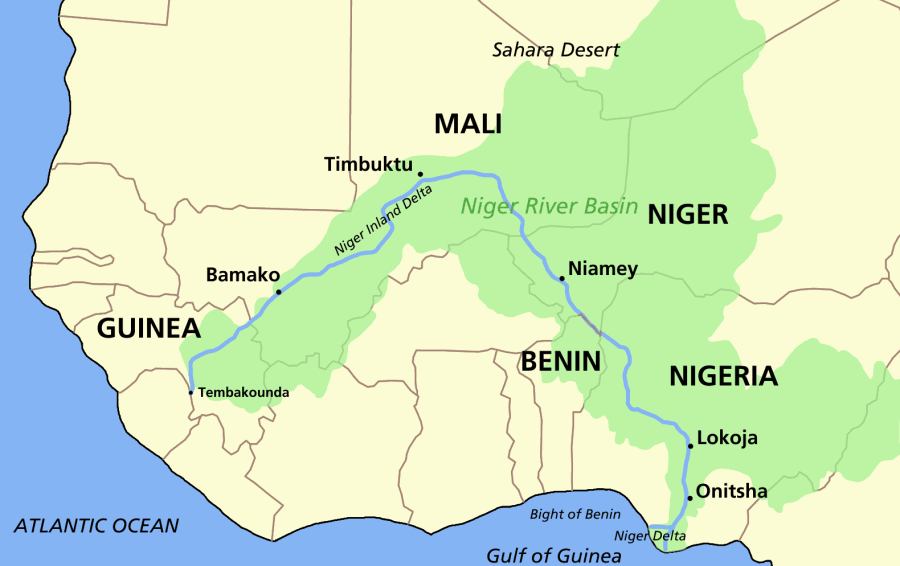
The source of the Niger River and the location of Timbuktu weren't known to Europeans.

The Association for Promoting the Discovery of the Interior Parts of Africa (commonly known as the African Association), founded in London on 9 June 1788, was a British club dedicated to the exploration of West Africa, with the mission of discovering the origin and course of the Niger River and the location of Timbuktu, the "lost city" of gold. The formation of this group was effectively the "beginning of the age of African exploration".

Organized by a dozen titled members of London's upper-class establishment and led by Sir Joseph Banks, the African Association felt that it was the great failing of the Age of Enlightenment that, in a time when men could sail around the world, the geography of Africa remained almost entirely uncharted (leading to the European-centric nickname, the "Dark Continent"). The Ancient Greeks and Romans knew more about the interior of Africa than did the British of the 18th century.

Motivated by desires for scientific knowledge and seeking opportunities for British commerce, the wealthy members each pledged to contribute five guineas per year to recruiting and funding expeditions from England to Africa.

== Background and incentives ==
The Mali Empire, from the 13th to 15th centuries, dominated the region which stretched from the West African coast between the Gambia and Senegal rivers almost to Sokoto in the east, and from 240 kilometres (150 miles) north of Timbuktu to the headwaters of the Niger. From Timbuktu flowed exports of gold and slaves in such quantities that the city took on the reputation in the outside world of possessing endless wealth. To Europeans fascinated by the discovery of new worlds, Timbuktu was too great a temptation to resist.

The Scotsman James Bruce had ventured to Ethiopia in 1769 and reached the source of the Blue Nile. His account of his travels provoked enthusiasm for further exploration into Africa by Europeans, and the men of the African Association were especially inspired to take action toward their own goals.

The location and course of the Niger River were almost completely unknown by Europeans in the 18th century, and most of their maps charting it were mere guesses. According to Davidson Nicol,

The most popular description from the 16th to 18th century was one in which the river rose from a lake near the Equator in the centre of Africa, the Lacus Niger. From this point it was supposed to flow northwards almost in a straight line to reach another large lake, the Lacus Bornu. Before reaching this, it was said to flow underground for a distance variously given as being between 18 and 60 miles [29 and 97 kilometres]. After Lake Bornu, it took a bend of 90 deg. and flowed westwards through another lake, Sigisma, or Guarde, to break eventually after another lake system into four rivers, amongst which were the Senegal and the Gambia, which all emptied into the Atlantic at the westernmost point of Africa.

Almost all the European theories of the river's course incorrectly hypothesized that it flowed east to west. Up to this point, no European had ever seen the river itself. In fact, many Europeans were not even convinced of its existence, though it had been well-known and well-traveled by Muslims for hundreds of years. The Niger had long been the major highway of commerce between the kingdoms of Africa's interior and traders from as far away as Iraq, and offered significant trade opportunities for Europe. According to Peter Brent's Black Nile,

The state that controlled the Niger traffic controlled the flow of trade; with the western Sahara route disused, shipments loaded or unloaded at Timbuctu could be carried along the central and eastern desert routes connecting the Niger with the Mediterranean countries. Domination of the Niger clearly was worth fighting for....

== The explorers and expeditions ==
=== John Ledyard ===
The first explorer recruited for travel to Africa was an American named John Ledyard. He had traveled around the world with Captain Cook and been acquainted with Thomas Jefferson before attempting a voyage across Russia, Siberia, and North America. Having failed to complete his journey, he called on Sir Joseph and the African Association, who thought him a perfect fit for their enterprise.

After setting sail from England on 30 June 1788 he arrived in August at Cairo. While preparing for his westward journey inland in search of the Niger, however, he fell ill and, trying to relieve his "bilious complaint", inadvertently poisoned himself with a fatal dose of sulphuric acid.

=== Simon Lucas ===
While Ledyard was still traveling, the African Association had enlisted Simon Lucas to attempt a mission from the northern end of the continent, starting at Tripoli. He spoke fluent Arabic and, having spent time in Morocco, was already friendly with the Tripolitanian ambassador. After arriving in Tripoli in October 1788, Lucas found guides to take him across the Libyan Desert but their journey was continually delayed by tribal wars blocking the route. Soon his guides abandoned him, and he was forced to limp back to England. He had, however, acquired some valuable information about the southern Libyan region.

Henry Beaufoy, the Association's recordkeeper, wrote down in the Proceedings of 1790 what little information had been gleaned from these two ill-fated journeys: that the Niger was reputed to be practically non-navigable, and what was known about Bornu and the edges of the Sahara. The club's curiosity had been further stimulated and they quickly renewed their search for explorers.

=== Daniel Houghton ===
In autumn of 1790, an Irish major named Daniel Houghton was commissioned to proceed from the mouth of the river Gambia on Africa's western coast, moving inland towards (hopefully) the Niger. He penetrated farther into Africa than any European before him. From the highest navigable point on the Gambia he continued on foot northeast toward Bundu, where the local authorities delayed his passage. Houghton eventually made his way as far as the north Saharan village of Simbing, 260 kilometres (160 miles) north of the Niger and 800 kilometres (500 miles) short of Timbuktu, but in September 1791, he was lured into the desert, robbed, and killed.

In May 1792 the African Association decided to capitalize on their discoveries and enlisted the support of the British government. They authorized their committee to make "whatever application to Government they may think advisable for rendering the late discoveries of Major Houghton effectually serviceable to the Commercial Interests of the Empire." A British presence on the Gambia would "strengthen the bonds of trade", so they proposed to install James Willis as consul in Senegambia. He was to develop good relations with the king of Bambouk by a gift of muskets, thereby opening up communication between the Niger and the Gambia and make inroads for trade with all the "gold-rich lands of the interior which undoubtedly lined the Niger’s banks".

=== Mungo Park ===
Mungo Park, a Scottish country doctor, was to travel with Willis to Senegambia, but when Willis’ departure was held up by bureaucratic and logistical problems, Park left England on the trade ship Endeavour and arrived on the Africa coast on June 4, 1795.

Park followed Houghton's route along the Gambia, and after surviving near-fatal encounters in Muslim territory he reached the land of the friendly Bambara people, who helped guide him to the Niger. The doctor was the first European to lay eyes on the Niger and the first to record that it did in fact flow inland to the east. He vowed to follow the river until it led him to Timbuktu, but the intense heat and besetting of thieves stopped him, and he had to return to England. Upon his return he was an instant national hero, and membership in the African Association swelled dramatically.

Mungo Park's travels and discoveries had the greatest impact upon Western knowledge of the African continent to that point. Frank T. Kryza (The Race for Timbuktu, 2006), writes:

News of Park’s accomplishments thrilled the African Association (and indeed all of England). He was the first white man to penetrate the forbidding interior of Africa for the sole purpose of finding out what lay there, and to come back alive. He invented a new and glorious calling, creating an adventurous species of hero: the lone, brave African explorer: the African traveler. This beau ideal soon captured the imagination, fed the fantasies, and filled the literature of Europe.

Park's expedition lasted two and a half years, and he published the account of the mission in his book, Travels into the Interior Districts of Africa (1799), which was devoured by readers across Europe. Park would take attempt a second expedition to find Timbuktu in 1805, but died before returning. The Niger had been found and its direction recorded, but its final termination had not been discovered. The "golden city" itself, was discovered by Park, but he died before he was able to share his discovery with the world and so it remained ‘undiscovered’.

=== Friedrich Hornemann ===
During Park's first journey, Banks had recruited Friedrich Hornemann to make another trip to Africa. He left in summer of 1797 and planned to travel the Cairo path across the Sahara toward Timbuktu while disguised as a Muslim. After finally joining a caravan from Cairo in 1800, he was never heard from again. Nearly 20 years later other explorers learned that Hornemann had died of dysentery after apparently reaching the Niger.

=== Johann Ludwig Burckhardt ===
Refusing to give up their quest, the African Association sent out a Swiss explorer, Johann Ludwig Burckhardt in 1809, tasking him to follow the same route from Cairo. Under orders to maintain a Muslim appearance, Burckhardt spent eight years traveling in Syria, learning the language and customs while waiting for a caravan to form. Just as some Arab merchants were ready to depart for the interior in 1817, the perfectly disguised "Euro-Muslim" died of dysentery before leaving Cairo.

=== Henry Nicholls ===
The most bizarre story of the African Association was that of Henry Nicholls in 1804. Kryza writes, "Having failed in assaults from the north (Tripoli), the east (Cairo), and the west (Gambia), the membership now proposed that an effort be made from the south. The site chosen from which to strike inland was a British trading post in the Gulf of Guinea". In the cruelest of ironies, the river mouth that emptied into the Gulf, from whence Nicholls was to set out in search of the Niger, was precisely the end of the Niger itself—only the Europeans did not know it yet. The starting point of the expedition was in fact its destination. By 1805 Nicholls had died, probably of malaria.

Meanwhile, England was preoccupied with its rivalry with France, and the government decided to take on a larger role in Africa's exploration in order to establish a commercial dominance there before the French. Sir Joseph Banks was growing ill, and slowly the African Association's influence began to diminish. "The torch was passed from the private to the public sector," though the Association continued its involvement in British exploration until it was absorbed by the Royal Geographical Society in 1831.

== The Influence ==
No explorer sent expressly by the African Association ever did find Timbuktu, though it was a major in the Royal African Corps named Alexander Gordon Laing who finally walked through its gates in 1826. The findings of the Association's recruits, however, accomplished much for European knowledge of Africa and its people. Peter Brent describes the common perception of Africa in the years preceding the African Association:

Jungle, desert, mountain and savannah swam into one disagreeable continuity...all the peoples and sub-divisions of the peoples, all the cultures and languages and religions, were forced by the European imagination into one mould. Out of it stepped the "native," the "savage," offering the blood of sacrifice to grinning gods, dancing in lunatic abandon around flames and...making a meal of his enemies.

In contrast, according to Brent, "the explorers themselves had no such view of Africans, no simple picture that rejected African reality and denied to Africans their full humanity." Mungo Park's description in particular contributed to a balanced perspective. George Shepperson writes that, beyond Park's romanticized travel exploits, "his writing indicated that Africans were human beings with their own cultures and commerce (and not monstrous creatures), with whom constructive relations would be possible."

This "humanizing" of the African people in the minds of Europeans was no doubt a boon to the abolition of the slave trade, since many of the African Association's members were abolitionists and had ties to William Wilberforce. "By the beginning of the 19th century," Brent wrote, "the attack on the whole appalling business had sharpened, and Africa had become the subject of the day. And still, despite everything, the European ignorance about most of the continent’s interior remained almost unaltered. It was a situation that had to be put right."

== See also ==
- Palestine Association
