= Scorpion Soup =

- Hardcover edition
- Author: Tahir Shah
- Cover artist: Rachana Shah
- Language: English
- Subject: Various
- Genre: Fiction
- Publisher: Secretum Mundi Publishing
- Publication date: June 8, 2013
- Publication place: United Kingdom
- Media type: Print (Hardback)
- Pages: 136
- ISBN: 978-0-9572429-1-3
- Preceded by: Timbuctoo

Scorpion Soup is a limited edition collection of stories by the travel writer and novelist Tahir Shah. The book was released on June 8, 2013 by Secretum Mundi Publishing.

== Overview ==
The collection is unusual in that all 18 stories link into one another, starting with a first person story about a fisherman, and returning to that same character. Inspired by the Arabian Nights, Shah experiments with interwoven layers, allowing one tale to flow into the next in a technique known as the Frame story. As occurs in the Arabian Nights, there is often no ending to one story before the next begins. The book has been inspired and is an homage to his grandfather, Ikbal Ali Shah.

== The stories of Scorpion Soup ==
- The Fisherman
- Idyll
- Capilongo
- Mittle-Mittle
- The Tale of the Rusty Nail
- The Shop That Sold Truth
- Frogland
- The Book of Pure Thoughts
- The Fish’s Dream
- Scorpion Soup
- The Clockmaker’s Bride
- The Most Foolish of Man
- The Man Whose Arms Grew Branches
- The Hermit
- Cat, Mouse
- The Singing Serpents
- The Princess of Zilzilam

== Illustrations ==
Scorpion Soup is illustrated with fold out maps from the Atlas Maior by the great seventeenth century Dutch cartographer Joan Blaeu.

== Reviews ==
- Stories within stories: A review of Tahir Shah’s ‘Scorpion Soup’ in The Toronto Review of Books.
- Review: Scorpion Soup in Bookfabulous blog.
- Book Review in Mystical Faction blog.
- Like a Moth to a Flame in The Uncustomary book review.
- An Intriguing Story within a Story in What Nikki reads.
