= Ras Nouadhibou =

Peninsula

Native name: Ras Nouadhibou رأس نواذيبو Cabo Blanco Cap Blanc
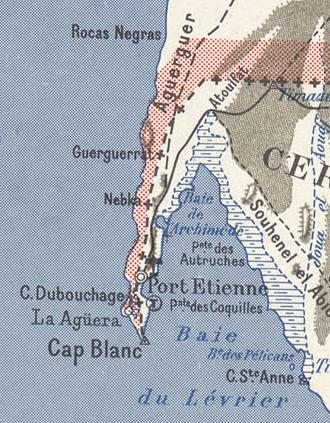
- 1958 map, showing what was then called Cap Blanc, divided between Spain and France

- Location within Mauritania

Geography
- Location: Africa
- Coordinates: 20°46′17″N 17°2′50″W
- Adjacent to: Atlantic Ocean; Dakhlet Nouadhibou
- Length: 60 km (37 mi)
- Width: 12 km (7.5 mi)

Administration
- Mauritania and Western Sahara

Ras Nouadhibou (Arabic: رأس نواذيبو) is a 60-kilometre (37 mi) peninsula or headland divided by the border between Mauritania and Western Sahara on the African coast of the Atlantic Ocean. Since colonial times, it has internationally been known as Cabo Blanco in Spanish or Cap Blanc in French (both meaning "White Headland").

== Geography ==
The headland forms the western limit of Dakhlet Nouadhibou Bay. It is divided between Mauritania and Western Sahara. On the western side lies the ghost town of La Güera; on the eastern side, less than 1 mile (1.6 km) from the border, lies Mauritania's second-largest city Nouadhibou (formerly Port Etienne). Although it is not the westernmost point of Africa, due to the Earth's tilt it is at least twice a year the last place in Africa where the sun sets.

=== Environment ===
==== Birds ====
The headland has been designated an Important Bird Area (IBA) by BirdLife International because it supports significant populations of wintering water birds, including ruddy turnstones, slender-billed and lesser black-backed gulls, and Caspian and Sandwich terns.

==== Monk seals ====
Cabo Blanco in the Atlantic Ocean along with the island of Gyaros in the eastern Mediterranean are the only places in the world where Mediterranean monk seals preserve the structure of a colony. In 1997, two-thirds of the colony died off, but there has been gradual recovery since.

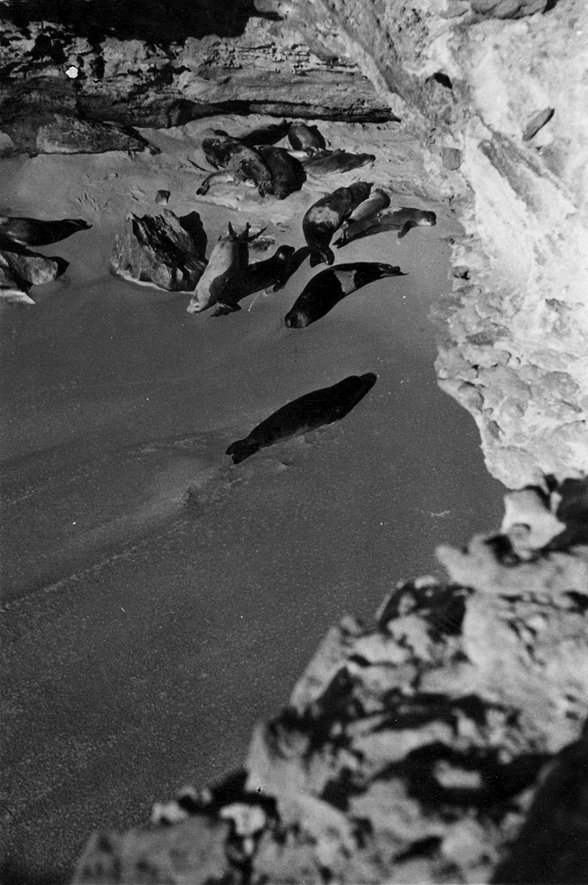
A monk seal colony on Ras Nouadhibou in 1945

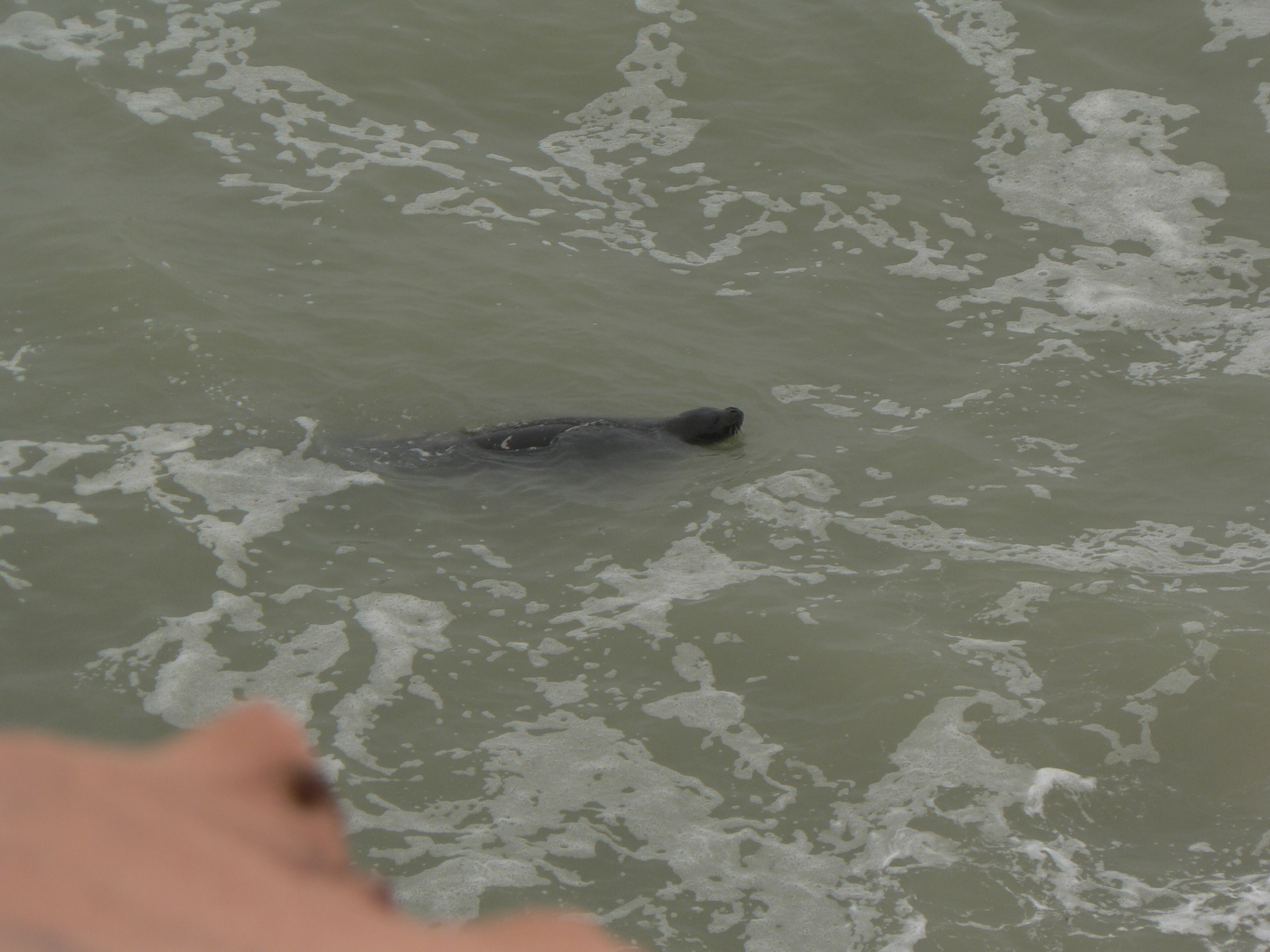
A seal swims at Ras Nouadhibou

The Mediterranean monk seal's (Monachus monachus) former range extended throughout the Northwest Atlantic Africa, Mediterranean and Black Sea, coastlines, including all offshore islands of the Mediterranean, and into the Atlantic and its islands: Canary, Madeira, Ilhas Desertas, Porto Santo, as far west as the Azores. Vagrants could be found as far south as Gambia and the Cape Verde islands, and as far north as continental Portugal and Atlantic France.

Today, the cape hosts the largest surviving single population of the species, and the only remaining site which still seems to preserve a colony structure. In the summer of 1997, two-thirds of its seal population were wiped out within two months, extremely compromising the species' viable population. While opinions on the precise causes of this epidemic remain divided (possible causes being a morbillivirus or a toxic algae bloom,) the mass die-off emphasized the precarious status of a species already regarded as critically endangered throughout its range.

While still far below the early 1997 count, numbers in this all-important location have since started a gradual recovery. Currently, the population in this location is estimated at 270 individuals, down from some 310 in 1997, but still the largest single colony by far. The threat of a similar incident that could wipe out the entire population remains.

== History ==
Portuguese sailing explorers first reached the location they called Cabo Branco in 1441. The Spanish interest in Western Africa, in the desert coast of the Sahara, resulted from fishing activities carried out from the Canary Islands by Spanish fishermen, who also hunted and traded seal. The Spanish fished and whaled off the Sahara coast from Dakhla to Ras Nouadhibou from 1500 to the present, ranging from whaling humpback whales and likely North Atlantic right whales and whale calves, mostly in Cape Verde, the Guinea gulf in Annobón, and the São Tomé and Príncipe islands.

These fishing activities have had a negative impact on wildlife and caused the disappearance or endangerment of many species of marine mammals and birds.

The Spanish originally claimed the land from 20° 51' N (near Cap Blanc) to 26° 8' N (near Cape Bojador) in 1885. This protectorate was governed from the Canary Islands in 1887. France would later claim the Western Sahara. At a joint convention held in 1900, the French and Spanish settled the boundary, dividing the area between Spanish Sahara and French West Africa. Today, the same border separates Western Sahara from Mauritania. However, the western side is currently policed by Mauritania, as neither Morocco nor the Polisario Front occupies the area.

A lighthouse was constructed on the cape in 1910.

== In literature ==
- Captain James Riley's captivity memoir, Sufferings in Africa (1815), recounts his and his men's experiences after beaching their ship at what is thought to be Cabo Blanco.
- Robert Adams's Narrative recounts a similar experience.
- The Pharaon from The Count of Monte Cristo sinks between here and Cape Bojador.
- Cape Blanco is mentioned briefly in the novel Moby Dick.
- Also referenced in Sir Arthur Conan Doyle's short story, J. Habakuk Jephson's Statement.
