= Friedrich Hornemann =

German explorer (1772–1801)

Friedrich Conrad Hornemann (15 September 1772 – 1801) was a German explorer in Africa.

Hornemann was born in Hildesheim, a city in Lower Saxony, Germany, located about 30 km southeast of Hannover. He was a young man when, early in 1796, he offered his services to the African Association of London as an explorer in Africa. The African Association sent him to the University of Göttingen to study Arabic and otherwise prepare for an expedition from the east into the unknown regions of North Africa. In September 1797 he arrived in Egypt, where he continued his studies. When the country was invaded by the French, he was confined in the citadel of Cairo to preserve him from the fanaticism of the populace. Liberated by the French, he received the patronage of Bonaparte. On 5 September 1798 he joined a caravan returning to the Maghreb from Mecca, attaching himself to a party of Fezzan merchants who accompanied the pilgrims. As an avowed Christian would not have been permitted to join the caravan Hornemann assumed the character of a young mamluk trading to Fezzan. He then spoke, but indifferently, both Arabic and Turkish, and he was accompanied as servant and interpreter by Joseph Freudenburg, a German convert to Islam, who had thrice made the pilgrimage to Mecca. Travelling by way of the oases of Siwa and Aujila, a black rocky desert was traversed to Temissa in Fezzan. Murzuk was reached on 17 November 1798.

Here Hornemann lived until June 1799, going thence to the city of Tripoli, whence in August of the same year he despatched his journals to London. He then returned to Murzuk. Nothing further is known with certainty concerning him or his companion. In Murzuk Hornemann had collected a great deal of trustworthy information concerning the peoples and countries of the western Sahara and central Sudan, and when he left Tripoli it was his intention to go directly to the Hausa country, which region he was the first European definitely to locate. "If I do not perish in my undertaking", he wrote in his journal, "I hope in five years I shall be able to make the Society better acquainted with the people of whom I have given this short description." The British consul at Tripoli heard from a source believed to be trustworthy that about June 1803 Jusef (Hornemann's Muslim name) was at Caina, i.e. Katsina, in Northern Nigeria, in good health and highly respected as a marabout. A report reached Murzuk in 1819 that the traveller had gone to Noofy (Nupe), and had died there. Hornemann was the first European in modern times to traverse the north-eastern Sahara, and up to 1910 no other explorer had followed his route across the Jebel-es-Suda from Aujila to Temissa.

The original text of Hornemann's journal, which was written in German, was printed at Weimar in 1801; an English translation, The Journal of Frederick Hornemann's travels, from Cairo to Mourzouk : the Capital of the Kingdom of Fezzan, in Africa, with maps and dissertations by Major James Rennell, appeared in London in 1802. A French translation of the English work, made by order of the First Consuls and augmented with notes and a memoir on the Egyptian oases by L. Langlès, was published in Paris in the following year. The French version is the most valuable of the three. Consult also the Proceedings of the African Association (1810), and The Geographical Journal November 1906.
