= Simon Lucas =

British explorer for the African Association

Simon Lucas (fl.c.1766–1799) was an English diplomat and explorer for the African Association.

== Life ==
The son of a vintner in Greyfriars, London, who was admitted to St. Paul's School, he was sent to Cádiz while still young, to be trained in commerce. He was captured on his return voyage by a Sallee rover, and enslaved in Morocco.

After three years' captivity Lucas went to Gibraltar. Edward Cornwallis, Gibraltar's governor, sent him back to Morocco as a vice-consul. He spent 16 years there.

In 1785 Lucas returned to England, and was appointed oriental interpreter at court. He undertook a journey in Africa for the Association for Promoting African Exploration, set up in 1788. He left England in August 1788 with the intention of crossing the desert from Tripoli to Fezzan, in what is now Libya. The plan was to collect information in Fezzan, and from traders, on the interior, and to return home by way of The Gambia or the Guinea coast.

At the end of October 1788, Lucas landed at Tripoli, and was received by Ali I Pasha. A revolt on the intended route delayed his journey, but two sharifs offered him safe conduct. Lucas started off on a mule, in an armed company with 18 others persons, in February 1789. They reached the ruins of Lebida, and then within a week "Menrata" (apparently Mesurata, i.e. Misrata).

Adverse conditions meant the journey planned by Lucas had to be scaled back. He obtained information from one of the sharifs, who had travelled as factor in the slave-trade for the king of Fezzan, by trading a copy of a map of Africa for accounts of Fezzan, the Bornou empire, and Nigritia.

Lucas turned back ar Memoon on 20 March 1789, reaching Tripoli on 6 April, and England on 26 July. He was succeeded in his African Association position by Daniel Houghton, and became consul in Tripoli in 1793.

== Works ==
Lucas's account of Africa was published in the Reports of the African Association.
