= Camel urine =

Liquid by-product of metabolism in camels

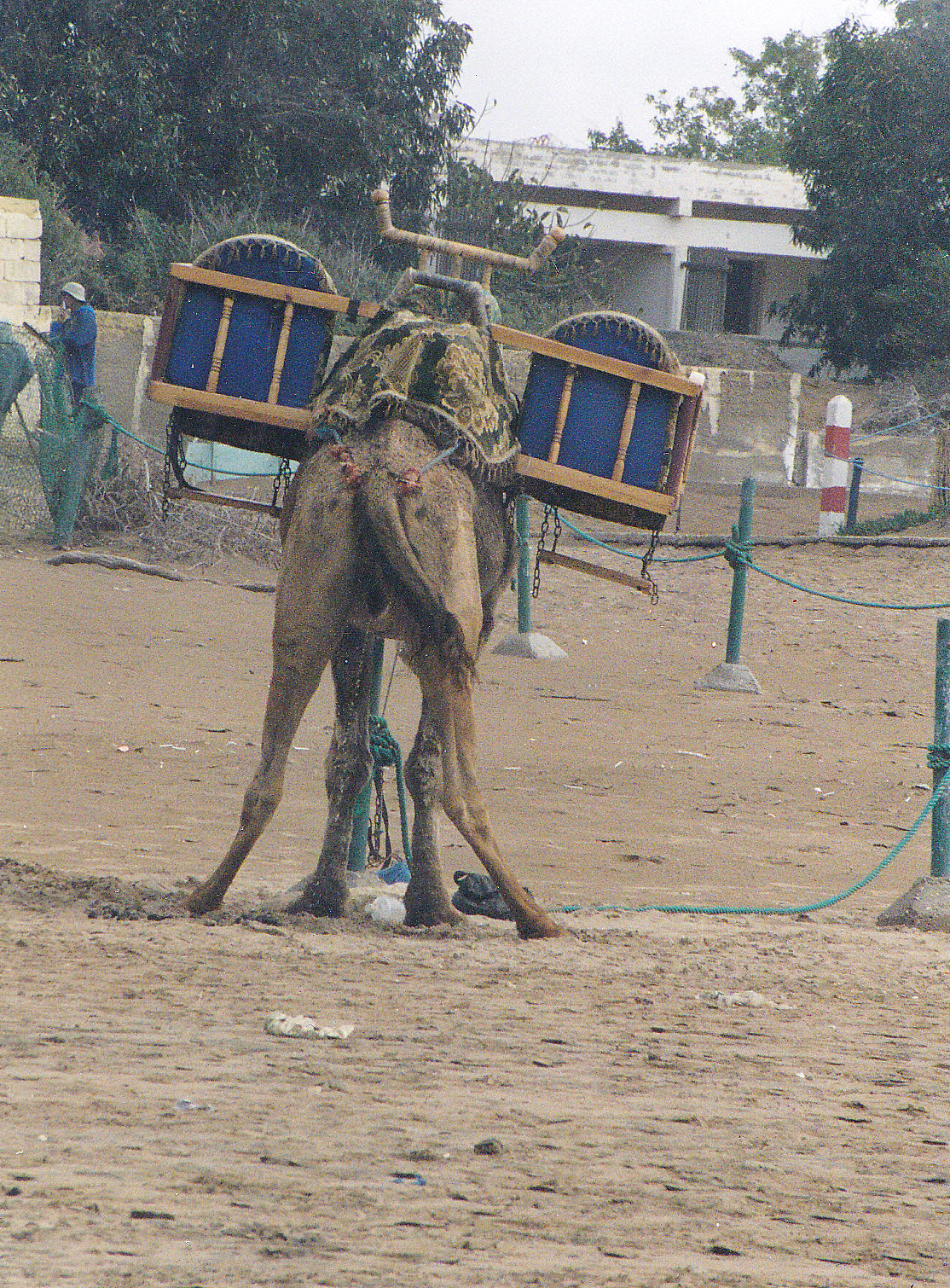
A urinating camel

Camel urine is a liquid by-product of metabolism in a camel's anatomy. Urine from camels has been used in medicine for centuries, being a part of Ayurvedic, and Islamic prophetic medicine. According to the World Health Organization, the use of camel urine as a medicine lacks scientific evidence. After the spread of MERS-CoV infections, the WHO urged people to refrain from drinking "raw camel milk or camel urine or eating meat that has not been properly cooked".

== Composition ==
Camel urine comes out as a thick syrup.

The kidneys and intestines of a camel are very efficient at reabsorbing water. Camel kidneys have a 1:4 cortex to medulla ratio. Thus, the medullary part of a camel's kidney occupies twice as much area as a cow's kidney. Secondly, the camel's renal corpuscles have a smaller diameter, which reduces surface area for filtration. These two major anatomical characteristics enable camels to conserve water and limit the volume of urine in extreme desert conditions.

Each kidney of an Arabian camel has a capacity of around 0.86 litres and can produce urine with high chloride concentrations. Like the horse, the dromedary has no gall bladder, an organ that requires water to function. Consequently, bile flows constantly. Most food is digested and absorbed into the bloodstream from the small intestine. Any remaining liquids and roughage move into the large intestine.

== Use in traditional medicine ==
=== Ayurveda ===
In the Caraka-Samhita, camel urine is mentioned as being slightly bitter. It recommends it as a remedy for hiccups, cough, and hemorrhoids. However, in the Yogacandrika, camel urine is referred to as having a remedial effect on various abdominal ailments. Furthermore, camel urine is prescribed for alleviating inflammation or edema, as per the Kāśyapa Samhitā.

=== Islamic prophetic medicine ===
A hadith in Book 4 (Ablution) of al-Bukhari's collection narrated by Anas ibn Malik was used to promote the consumption of Arabian camel urine as a medicine. The climate of Medina did not suit some people, so Muhammad ordered them to follow his shepherd and drink his camel's milk and urine (as a medicine). So they followed the shepherd and drank the camel's milk and urine till their bodies became healthy. The authentic hadith also states "Some people of ‘Ukl or ‘Uraina tribe came to Medina and its climate did not suit them ... So the Prophet ordered them to go to the herd of Milch camels and to drink their milk and urine (as a medicine). ... So they went as directed and after they became healthy". Bukhari also narrated an otherwise identical version of this Hadith, without the mention of "urine". The event has also been recorded in Sahih Muslim, History of the Prophets and Kings and Kitāb aṭ-ṭabaqāt al-kabīr.

Indian Islamic scholar Mohammad Najeeb Qasmi notes various theories proposed by Hanafi and Shaafi’e scholars for a canonical understanding of the implications. This book refers to topical application of milch camel urine as the actual word of the saying has the word Azmadu which means to apply a layer of something. However, Bachtiar Nasir, an Islamic scholar, advocated for and defended the consumption of camel urine, claiming the mixture of camel urine and milk has medicinal benefits.

In Middle Eastern societies, camel urine is consumed as medicine, but some see its use as najis—ritually unclean according to Islam Law. However, in the Arabian Peninsula, bottled camel urine is still sold and consumed as prophetic medicine.

=== Medieval times ===
Avicenna in The Canon of Medicine noted that a mixture of camel milk and urine can be beneficial for some diseases such as dropsy and jaundice.

=== Modern research ===
In Yemen, camel urine is consumed and used for treating ailments, though it has been widely denounced. Some salons are said to use it as a treatment for hair loss. The camel urine from a virgin camel is priced at twenty US dollars per liter, with herders saying that it has curative powers. It is traditionally mixed with milk.

Certain preclinical studies have claimed that camel urine possesses various therapeutic advantages, including antimicrobial, anti-inflammatory, anticancer properties, and potential cardiovascular benefits. For example, in 2012, a study conducted at the Department of Molecular Oncology of King Faisal Specialist Hospital and Research Center, and published in the Journal of Ethnopharmacology, found that camel urine contains anti-cancerous agents that are cytotoxic against various, but not all, human cancer cell lines in vitro.

A study published on the World Health Organization's Eastern Mediterranean Health Journal found that camel urine showed no clinical benefits in cancer patients, with two of the participants developing brucellosis. Given the lack of scientific evidence supporting the use of camel urine as a traditional medicine, it is advisable to discontinue its promotion.

In 2017, a joint study by King Faisal University and the University of Hong Kong found that experimental infections of dromedaries with MERS-CoV did not show any evidence of virus in the urine. Therefore, the camel urine is an unlikely source of virus transmission to humans.

== See also ==
- Urophagia
- Zoonosis
