= James Riley (captain) =

American ship captain (1777–1840)

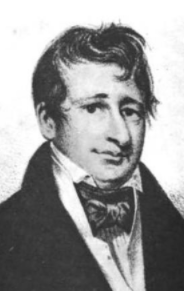
- Born: October 27, 1777; Middletown, Connecticut
- Died: March 13, 1840 (aged 62); At sea
- Occupations: Ship captain, writer
- Spouse: Phebe Miller (m. 1802)
- Children: 5

James Riley (October 27, 1777 – March 13, 1840) was the captain of the United States merchant ship Commerce.

== Early life ==
James Riley was born in Middletown, Connecticut on October 27, 1777. At age 15, he began serving as a cabin boy on a trading vessel in the West Indies. By age 20 he had become a ship captain.

He married Phebe Miller in January 1802, and they had five children.

== Sufferings in Africa ==
Riley led his crew through the Sahara Desert, after they were shipwrecked off the coast of contemporary Morocco in August 1815, and wrote a memoir about their ordeal. This true story describes how they came to be shipwrecked and their travails in the Sahara. The book, published in 1817 and originally titled Authentic Narrative of the Loss of the American Brig 'Commerce' by the 'Late Master and Supercargo' James Riley, is modernly republished as Sufferings in Africa.

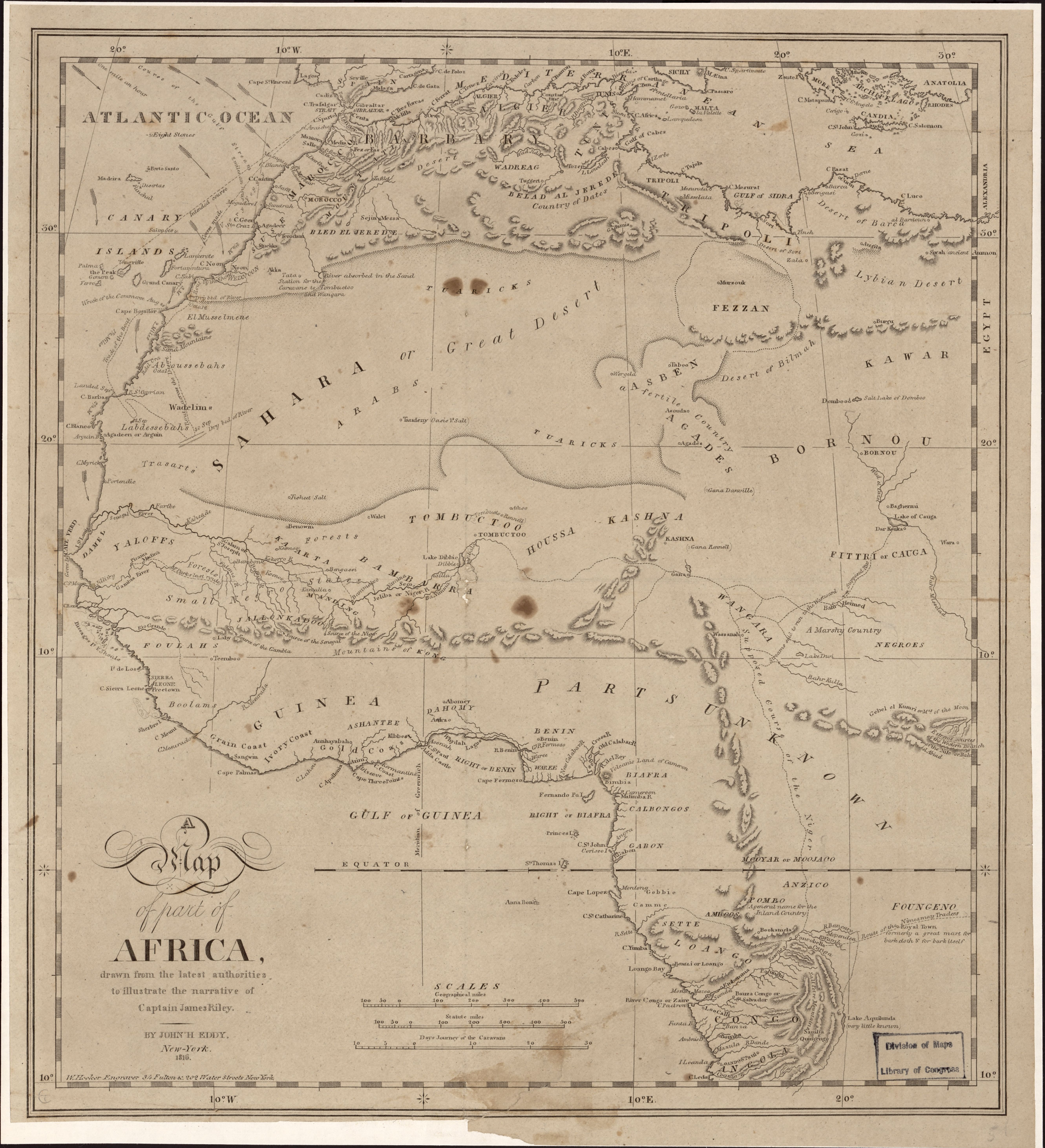

== Aftermath ==
He died March 13, 1840, on his vessel the Brig William Tell which he was sailing from New York to "St. Thomas in the Caribbean" (Note: The relevant "Saint Thomas" is not clearly specified in available sources: it may be Saint Thomas Island, now in the U.S. Virgin Islands.) "of disease caused by unparalleled suffering more than twenty years previous during his shipwreck and captivity on the desert of Sahara".

In 1851, eleven years after Riley's death at sea, the publishing firm of G. Brewster issued the book Sequel to Riley's Narrative: Being a Sketch of Interesting Incidents in the Life, Voyages and Travels of Capt. James Riley [...].

== Influence ==
Riley founded the midwestern village of Willshire, Ohio, which he named for William Willshire, the man who redeemed him from slavery.

Abraham Lincoln, who later became president of the United States, listed Sufferings in Africa as one of the three most influential works that shaped his political ideology, particularly his views on slavery. The others were the Bible and The Pilgrim's Progress (1678).

== Published accounts ==
- Carte d'une partie de l'Afrique dessinée d'après les dernières découvertes pour servir à l'intelligence de la relation du capitaine James Riley, New York: John H. Eddy, cartographe; Collin, graveur; 1816 [Bibliothèque nationale de France / Gallica].
- Riley, James (2000). Suffering Africa - Astonishing Enslaved African. Lyons Press. ISBN 1585740802. Reissue of the original.
- King, Dean (2004). Skeletons on the Zahara: A True story of survival. Little, Brown. ISBN 0316835145.
- "'I found him to be a very intelligent and feeling man': Enslaved James Riley Encounters an Arab Trader, 1815". History Matters: The U.S. Survey Course. Brief summary of the historical context of Riley's ordeal, as introduction to an extract from Narrative of the Loss of the American Brig "Commerce", an 1817 edition of Riley's memoir.
- Maislish, David (2005). White Slave: Based on the Journal of James Riley; Wrecked with His Crew Off the Coast of Africa, Enslaved and Seeking Redemption in the Desert (First ed.). Pen Press. ISBN 978-1-904754-98-5. Based on the original account, rewritten for modern readers; with additional explanatory material.
- Winchester, Simon (2010). Atlantic: Great Sea Battles, Heroic Discoveries, Titanic Storms, and a Vast Ocean of a Million Stories. Harper. pp. 239. ISBN 978-0-06-170258-7.

== See also ==
- Robert Adams (sailor) – American travel writer
- Barbary slave trade – Slave markets in North Africa
- Captivity narrative – Genre of propaganda literature
- History of Western Sahara
- Slave narrative – Autobiographical accounts of enslaved persons
