= Slave narrative =

Autobiographical accounts of enslaved persons

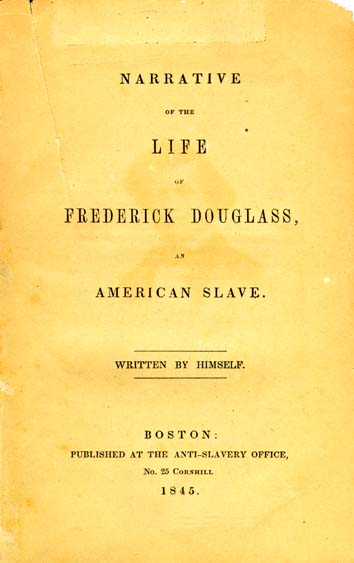
Narrative of the Life of Frederick Douglass, one of the most famous slave narratives

The slave narrative is a type of literary genre involving the (written) autobiographical accounts of enslaved persons, particularly black Africans enslaved in the Americas, though many other examples exist. Over six thousand such narratives are estimated to exist; about 150 narratives were published as separate books or pamphlets. In the United States during the Great Depression (1930s), more than 2,300 additional oral histories on life during slavery were collected by writers sponsored and published by the Works Progress Administration, a New Deal program. Most of the 26 audio-recorded interviews are held by the Library of Congress.

Some of the earliest memoirs of captivity known in the English-speaking world were written by European colonists and later Americans, captured and sometimes enslaved in North Africa by local Arab Muslims, usually Barbary pirates. These were part of a broad category of "captivity narratives". Beginning in the 17th century, these included accounts by European colonists and later American settlers in North America who were captured and held by American Indian tribes. Several well-known captivity narratives were published before the American Revolution, and they often followed forms established with the narratives of captivity in North Africa. North African accounts did not continue to appear after the Napoleonic Era; accounts from North Americans, captured by western Indian tribes migrating west continued until the end of the 19th century.

== As a literary genre ==
The development of slave narratives from autobiographical accounts to modern fictional works led to the establishment of slave narratives as a literary genre. This large rubric of this so-called "captivity literature" includes more generally "any account of the life, or a major portion of the life, of a fugitive or former slave, either written or orally related by the slave himself or herself". Whereas the first narratives told the stories of fugitive or freed slaves in a time of racial prejudice, they further developed into retrospective fictional novels and extended their influence until common days. Not only maintaining the memory and capturing the historical truth transmitted in these accounts, but slave narratives were primarily the tool for fugitive or former slaves to state their independence in the 19th century, and carry on and conserve authentic and true historical facts from a first-person perspective. They go further than just autobiographies, and are moreover "a source for reconstructing historical experience". The freed slaves that wrote the narratives are considered as historians, since "memory and history come together". These accounts link elements of the slave's personal life and destiny with key historical phenomena, such as the American Civil War and the Underground Railroad.

In simple, yet powerful storylines, slave narratives follow in general a plot common to all of them: starting from the initial situation, the slave in his master's home, the protagonist escapes in the wilderness and narrates the struggle for survival and recognition throughout his uncertain journey to freedom. After all, these narratives were written retrospectively by freed slaves and/or their abolitionist advocates, hence the focus on the transformation from the dehumanized slave to the self-emancipated free man. This change often entailed literacy as a means to overcome captivity, as the case of Frederick Douglass highlights. The narratives are very graphic to the extent that extensive accounts of e.g. whipping, abuse and rape of enslaved women are exposed in detail (see Treatment of slaves in the United States). The denunciation of the slave owners, in particular their cruelty and hypocrisy, is a recurring theme in slave narratives, and in some examples denounced the double standards (e.g. in Douglass's narrative, his slave owner Hopkins is a very religious, but also brutal man).

According to James Olney, a typical outline looks the following way:

A. An engraved portrait, signed by the narrator.

B. A title page that includes the claim, as an integral part of the title, "Written by Himself" (or some close variant: "Written from a statement of Facts Made by Himself"; or "Written by a Friend, as Related to Him by Brother Jones"; etc.)

C. A handful of testimonials and/or one or more prefaces or introductions written either by a white abolitionist friend of the narrator (William Lloyd Garrison, Wendell Phillips) or by a white amanuensis/editor/author actually responsible for the text (John Greenleaf Whittier, David Wilson, Louis Alexis Chamerovzow), in the course of which preface the reader is told that the narrative is a "plain, unvarnished tale" and that naught "has been set down in malice, nothing exaggerated, nothing drawn from the imagination"—indeed, the tale, it is claimed, understates the horrors of slavery.

D. A poetic epigraph, by preference from William Cowper.

E. The actual narrative:

1. a first sentence beginning, "I was born ... ," then specifying a place but not a date of birth;
2. a sketchy account of parentage, often involving a white father;
3. description of a cruel master, mistress, or overseer, details of first observed whipping and numerous subsequent whippings, with women very frequently the victims;
4. an account of one extraordinarily strong, hardworking slave often "pure African"-who, because there is no reason for it, refuses to be whipped;
5. record of the barriers raised against slave literacy and the overwhelming difficulties encountered in learning to read and write;
6. description of a "Christian" slaveholder (often of one such dying in terror) and the accompanying claim that "Christian" slaveholders are invariably worse than those professing no religion;
7. description of the amounts and kinds of food and clothing given to slaves, the work required of them, the pattern of a day, a week, a year;
8. account of a slave auction, of families being separated and destroyed, of distraught mothers clinging to their children as they are torn from them, of slave coffles being driven South;
9. description of patrols, of failed attempt(s) to escape, of pursuit by men and dogs;
10. description of successful attempt(s) to escape, lying by during the day, travelling by night guided by the North Star, reception in a free state by Quakers who offer a lavish breakfast and much genial thee/thou conversation;
11. taking of a new last name (frequently one suggested by a white abolitionist) to accord with new social identity as a free man, but retention of first name as a mark of continuity of individual identity;
12. reflections on slavery.

F. An appendix or appendices composed of documentary material bills of sale, details of purchase from slavery, newspaper items-, further reflections on slavery, sermons, anti-slavery speeches, poems, appeals to the reader for funds and moral support in the battle against slavery.

There is no consensus about what exact type of literature slave narratives are, whether they can be considered as a proper genre, comprised in the large category captivity narrative, or are autobiographies, memoirs, testimonials, or novels; nonetheless, they play a big part in keeping up the memory of slavery and in approaching a topic that was considered as a taboo for a long time – especially since many denied and still deny the existence of slavery. Given the participation in the 19th century of abolitionist editors (at least in the United States), influential early 20th-century historians, such as Ulrich B. Phillips in 1929, suggested that, as a class, "their authenticity was doubtful". These doubts have been criticized following better academic research of these narratives, since the late 20th-century historians have more often validated the accounts of slaves about their own experiences.

== North American slave narratives ==
Slave narratives by African slaves from North America were first published in England in the 18th century. They soon became the main form of African-American literature in the 19th century. Slave narratives were publicized by abolitionists, who sometimes participated as editors, or writers if slaves were not literate. During the first half of the 19th century, the controversy over slavery in the United States led to impassioned literature on both sides of the issue.

To present the reality of slavery, a number of former slaves, such as Harriet Tubman, Harriet Jacobs, and Frederick Douglass, published accounts of their enslavement and their escapes to freedom. Lucy Delaney wrote an account that included the freedom suit waged by her mother in Missouri for their freedom. Eventually some 6,000 former slaves from North America and the Caribbean wrote accounts of their lives, and over 100 book-length accounts were published from formerly enslaved people worldwide.

Before the American Civil War, some authors wrote fictional accounts of slavery to create support for abolitionism. The prime example is Uncle Tom's Cabin (1852) by Harriet Beecher Stowe. The success of her novel and the social tensions of the time brought a response by white Southern writers, such as William Gilmore Simms and Mary Eastman, who published what were called anti-Tom novels. Both kinds of novels were bestsellers in the 1850s.

=== Tales of religious redemption ===
From the 1770s to the 1820s, slave narratives generally gave an account of a spiritual journey leading to Christian redemption. The authors usually characterized themselves as Africans rather than slaves, as most were born in Africa.

Examples include:

- Ukawsaw Gronniosaw, A Narrative of the Most Remarkable Particulars in the Life of James Albert "Ukawsaw Gronniosaw", an African Prince, Bath, England, 1772
- Olaudah Equiano, The Interesting Narrative of the Life of Olaudah Equiano, London, 1789
- Venture Smith, A Narrative of the Life and Adventures of Venture, a Native of Africa: But Resident Above Sixty Years in the United States of America, New London, 1798
- Jeffrey Brace, The Blind African Slave, Or Memoirs of Boyrereau Brinch, Nicknamed Jeffrey Brace, as told to Benjamin F. Prentiss, Esq., St. Albans, Vermont, 1810; edited and with an introduction by Kari J. Winter, Madison, WI: University of Wisconsin Press, 2004, ISBN 0-299-20140-6
- John Jea, The Life, History, and Unparalleled Sufferings of John Jea, the African Preacher, 1811
- Greensbury Washington Offley, A Narrative of the Life and Labors of the Rev. G. W. Offley, a Colored Man, Local Preacher and Missionary, 1859

Some more recent narratives, such as Petro Kilekwa's Slave Boy to Priest: The Autobiography of Padre Petro Kilekwa (1937), followed a similar theme.

==== Islamic slave narratives ====
By contrast, some slave narratives demonstrate the resiliency of Muslim spiritual identity while enslaved by Christian masters. These narratives tend to highlight the civilised, often aristocratic and scholarly background of their subjects, to emphasise their respectability and defy efforts at racial dehumanisation; and similarly, also tend to discuss their subjects' African Islamic (usually Fulani) background, to demonstrate that they have a civilisation of their own (in contrast to Christian redemption narratives, who answer racist dehumanisation by having black people achieve redemption through white Christians).

The slave narratives of Ayuba Suleiman Diallo are one such example. Educated as an Islamic scholar in the Fulani state of Futa Toro, Diallo was captured and sold to the Royal Africa Company in 1730, and thereafter brought to Maryland as a slave. During his enslavement, Diallo continued to practice Islam; and his aristocratic blood, education, literacy in multiple languages, and cultivated manner impressed elite audiences in America and Britain, challenging efforts to dehumanise him and his race. He was freed and returned to his homeland in 1734. James Oglethorpe—once governor of the Royal Africa Company—was moved by Diallo's suffering; and when he founded Georgia, he introduced a ban on slavery in 1735 (known popularly as the Georgia Experiment). Two contemporary slave narratives of Diallo's life exist: a biography by Thomas Bluett, titled Some Memories of the Life of Job, the Son of the Solomon; and a firsthand memoir, within Francis Moore's Travels Into the Inland Parts of Africa.

Other examples include:

- Abdur-Rahman Ibrahim ibn Sori: A Fulani prince and Islamic scholar from Futa Djallon, enslaved in 1788 on a tobacco plantation in Mississippi. His story caught the attention of abolitionist newspaper editor Andrew Marschalk, whose articles about ibn Sori gained national attention. In 1826, Sultan Abdur-Rahman of Morocco petitioned for ibn Sori's freedom; and Secretary of State Henry Clay convinced President John Quincy Adams to free ibn Sori in 1829. His narrative (as published in Marschalk's articles) were also a boon to the American Colonisation Society, and ibn Sori would live out the rest of his days in Liberia. His narrative was adapted into a PBS film—Prince Among Slaves—in 2007.
- Omar ibn Said: A Fulani Islamic scholar from Futa Toro, notable for his taqiyah (secret practice of Islam). He publicly presented as a Christian for much of his life; but his manuscripts including his autobiography—The Life of Omar ben Saeed, Called Morro, a Fullah Slave in Fayetteville, N.C. Owned by Governor Owen (which opens with Surah al-Mulk, contains passages praising Muhammad, and interprets Jesus in ways that align with Islam)—either allude or outright reveal that he had kept his Islamic faith in secret. As with the previous examples, his multilingual education and scholastic credentials were an important part of his life and narrative—while enslaved, he also wrote texts on history and theology, some of which was in service to Christian missionaries in Africa.
- Yarrow Mamout

=== Tales to inspire the abolitionist movement ===
From the mid-1820s, writers consciously chose the autobiographical form to generate enthusiasms for the abolitionist movement. Some writers adopted literary techniques, including the use of fictionalized dialogue. Between 1835 and 1865 more than 80 such narratives were published. Recurrent features include: slave auctions, the break-up of families, and frequently two accounts of escapes, one of which is successful. As this was the period of the forced migration of an estimated one million slaves from the Upper South to the Deep South through the internal slave trade, the experiences of auctions and separation of families were common to many.

Examples include:

- Juan Francisco Manzano, Autobiography of a Slave, Havana, 1835
- William Grimes, Life of William Grimes, the Runaway Slave, New York, 1825
- Solomon Bayley, A Narrative of Some Remarkable Incidents in the Life of Solomon Bayley, Formerly a Slave in the State of Delaware, North America, 1825
- Mary Prince, The History of Mary Prince, a West Indian Slave, London, 1831
- Charles Ball, Slavery in the United States: A Narrative of the Life and Adventures of Charles Ball, A Black Man, Lewistown, 1836
- Moses Roper, A Narrative of Adventures and Escape of Moses Roper from American Slavery, London, 1837
- "Recollections of Slavery by a Runaway Slave", The Emancipator, August 23, September 13, September 20, October 11, October 18, 1838
- Lunsford Lane, The Narrative of Lunsford Lane, Formerly of Raleigh, N.C. Embracing an Account of His Early Life, the Redemption by Purchase of Himself and Family from Slavery, and His Banishment from the Place of His Birth for the Crime of Wearing a Colored Skin, 1842
- Frederick Douglass, Narrative of the Life of Frederick Douglass, an American Slave, Boston, 1845
- Lewis and Milton Clarke, Narratives of the Sufferings of Lewis and Milton Clarke, Sons of a Soldier of the Revolution, During a Captivity of More Than Twenty Years Among the Slaveholders of Kentucky, One of the So-Called Christian States of North America, Boston, 1846
- William Wells Brown, Narrative of William Wells Brown, A Fugitive Slave, Boston, 1847
- Henry Box Brown, Narrative of the Life of Henry Box Brown, Boston, 1849
- Josiah Henson, The Life of Josiah Henson, Formerly a Slave, Now an Inhabitant of Canada, as Narrated by Himself, Boston, 1849
- Henry Bibb, Narrative of the Life and Adventures of Henry Bibb, an American Slave, New York, 1849
- James W. C. Pennington, The Fugitive Blacksmith, or Events in the History of James W. C. Pennington, London, 1849
- Henry Watson, Narrative of Henry Watson, A Fugitive Slave, Boston, 1848.
- Solomon Northup, Twelve Years a Slave, Auburn, and Buffalo, New York, and London, 1853
- John Brown, Slave Life in Georgia: A Narrative of the Life, Sufferings, and Escape of John Brown, a Fugitive Slave, Now in England, 1855
- The Life of John Thompson, A Fugitive Slave, Worcester, Massachusetts, 1855
- John Swanson Jacobs, The United States Governed by Six Hundred Thousand Despots, Sidney, Australia, 1855; University of Chicago Press, 2024.
- Harriet Jacobs (sister of John S.), Incidents in the Life of a Slave Girl, Boston, 1861
- Kate E. R. Pickard, The Kidnapped and the Ransomed, Being the Personal Recollections of Peter Still and his Wife "Vina", after Forty Years of Slavery, New York, 1856
- Jermain Wesley Loguen, The Rev. J. W. Loguen, as a Slave and as a Freeman, a Narrative of Real Life, 1859
- Ellen and William Craft, Running a thousand Miles for Freedom, or the Escape of William and Ellen Craft from Slavery, London, 1860
- John Andrew Jackson, The Experience of a Slave in South Carolina, London, 1862
- Jacob D. Green, Narrative of the Life of J. D. Green, a Runaway Slave from Kentucky, Huddersfield, 1864
- John M. Washington, Memorys [sic] of the Past, 1873. Published in Blight, David W., A Slave No More: Two Men Who Escaped to Freedom, Including Their Own Narratives of Emancipation. Orlando: Harcourt, Inc., 2007.
- Wallace Turnage, the second man whose narrative of emancipation was published in Blight, David W., A Slave No More: Two Men Who Escaped to Freedom, Including Their Own Narratives of Emancipation.

=== Tales of progress ===
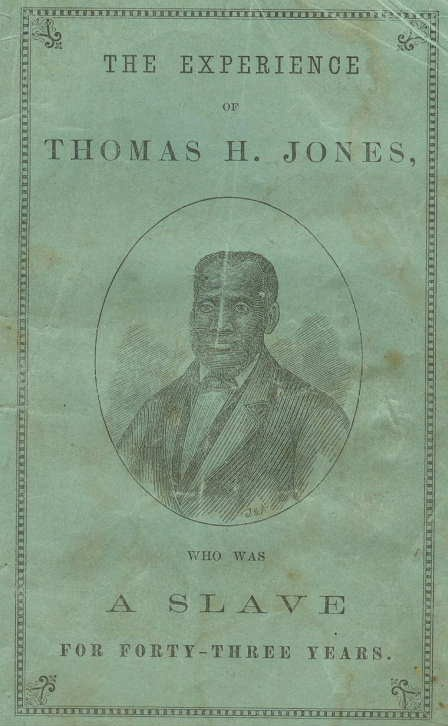
Slave narrative of Thomas H. Jones published in 1871

Following the defeat of the slave states of the Confederate South, the authors had less need to convey the evils of slavery. Some gave a sentimental account of plantation life and ended with the narrator adjusting to the new life of freedom. The emphasis of writers shifted conceptually toward a recounting of individual and racial progress rather than securing freedom.

Examples include:

- James Mars, The Life of James Mars, A Slave Born and Sold in Connecticut, Hartford, 1864
- Paul Jennings, A Colored Man's Reminiscences of James Madison, 1865
- William Parker, The Freedman's Story, published in The Atlantic Monthly, 1866
- Elizabeth Keckley, Behind the Scenes: Or, Thirty Years a Slave and Four Years in the White House, 1868
- William Still, The Underground Railroad, 1872, recounts the experiences of hundreds of slaves
- James Lindsay Smith, Autobiography of James L. Smith, 1881, published by the Norwich Bulletin
- Lucy Delaney, From the Darkness Cometh the Light, or, Struggles for Freedom, 1892 — this is unique as the only first-person account of a successful freedom suit
- Louis Hughes, Thirty Years a Slave: From Bondage to Freedom, Milwaukee, 1897
- Booker T. Washington, Up From Slavery, Garden City, New York, 1901
- Sam Aleckson, Before the War, and After the Union: An Autobiography, Boston, 1929

=== WPA slave narratives ===
During the Great Depression of the 1930s, the New Deal Works Projects Administration (WPA) employed writers and researchers from the Federal Writers' Project to interview and document the stories of African Americans who were former slaves. Most had been children when the Thirteenth Amendment was passed. Produced between 1936 and 1938, the narratives recount the experiences of more than 2,300 former slaves. Some interviews were recorded; 23 of 26 known audio recordings are held by the American Folklife Center of the Library of Congress. The last interview of a former slave was with Fountain Hughes, then 101, in Baltimore, Maryland, in 1949. He was a grandson of a slave owned by President Thomas Jefferson at Monticello.

=== North American slave narratives as travel literature ===
Slave narratives inherently involved travel and form a significant type of travel writing. As John Cox says in Traveling South, "travel was a necessary prelude to the publication of a narrative by a slave, for slavery could not be simultaneously experienced and written." Where many travel narratives are written by privileged travelers, slave narratives show people traveling despite significant legal barriers to their actions, and in this way are a distinct and essential element in how travel narratives formed the American character.

== North African slave narratives ==
In comparison to North American and Caribbean slave narratives, the North African slave narratives in English were written by British and American white slaves captured (often at sea or through Barbary pirates) and enslaved in North Africa in the 18th and early 19th centuries. These narratives have a distinct form in that they highlight the "otherness" of the Muslim slave traders, whereas the African-American slave narratives often call slave traders to account as fellow Christians.

Narratives focused on the central themes of freedom and liberty which drew inspiration from the American Revolution. Since the narratives include the recurrence of themes and events, quoting, and relying heavily upon each other it is believed by scholars that the main source of information was other narratives more so than real captivities. Female captives were depicted as Gothic fiction characters clinging to the hope of freedom, thus more relatable to the audience.

Examples include:

- A True and Faithful Account of the Religion and Manners of the Mahometans by Joseph Pitts (1663–1735) tells his capture as a boy age 14 or 15 by pirates while fishing off Newfoundland. His sale as a slave and his life under three different masters in North Africa, and his travels to Mecca are all described.
- Tyrkja-Gudda, 1952 and 2001
- Thomas Pellow, The History of the Long Captivity and Adventures of Thomas Pellow, In South Barbary, 1740
- A Curious, Historical and Entertaining Narrative of the Captivity and almost unheard of Sufferings and Cruel treatment of Mr Robert White, 1790
- A Journal of the Captivity and Suffering of John Foss; Several Years a Prisoner in Algiers, 1798
- History of the Captivity and Sufferings of Mrs Maria Martin who was six years a slave in Algiers; two of which she was confined in a dismal dungeon, loaded with irons, by the command of an inhuman Turkish officer. Written by herself. To which is added, a concise history of Algiers, with the manners and customs of the people, 1812
- Captain James Riley, Sufferings in Africa, 1815
- The Narrative of Robert Adams, An American Sailor who was wrecked on the West Coast of Africa in the year 1810; was detained Three Years in Slavery by the Arabs of the Great Desert, 1816
- James Leander Cathcart, The Captives, Eleven Years a Prisoner in Algiers, published in 1899, many years after his captivity
- Maria ter Meetelen, The Curious and Amazing Adventures of Maria ter Meetelen; Twelve Years a Slave (1731- 43), 1748

== Women's slave narratives ==
Narratives by enslaved women include the memoirs of Harriet Jacobs, Mary Prince, Mattie J. Jackson, and "old Elizabeth," among others.

In her narrative, Mary Prince, a Bermuda-born woman and slave discusses her deep connection with her master's wife and the pity she felt for the wife as she witnessed the "ill-treatment" the wife suffered at the hands of her husband. Prince was taught to read by Moravian missionaries. Literacy, however, was not a common theme for all enslaved women. The life story of "old Elizabeth" was transcribed from her oral account at the age of 97.

== Other slave narratives ==
As slavery has been practiced all over the world for millennia, some narratives cover places and times other than these main two. One example is the account given by John R. Jewitt, an English armourer enslaved for years by Maquinna of the Nootka people in the Pacific Northwest. The Canadian Encyclopedia calls his memoir a "classic of captivity literature" and it is a rich source of information about the indigenous people of Vancouver Island.

- Narrative of the Adventures and Sufferings of John R. Jewitt, only survivor of the crew of the ship Boston, during a captivity of nearly three years among the savages of Nootka Sound: with an account of the manners, mode of living, and religious opinions of the natives. Middletown, Connecticut, printed by Loomis and Richards, 1815

Macuncuzade Mustafa Efendi, an Ottoman qadi, poet, and slave owner who was captured by the Hospitaller fleet off Cyprus in 1597 and was enslaved in Hospitaller Malta until he was ransomed in 1600, wrote a narrative entitled Baz Kest-i Hakiri-i Malta Sergiizess-i Esiri-i Malta based on notes and poems he had composed while imprisoned. A manuscript copy of it made by a scribe named Omer in 1602 is preserved at the Hacı Selim Ağa Library in Üsküdar, and its text was published in the 20th century. It is regarded as an important primary source about slavery in Malta.

During the 19th and 20th centuries, the Embassies and legations of the Western countries on the Arabian Peninsula had secured the right to manumit any fugitive slave who sought refuge on the grounds of the embassy. Many fugitive slaves used this opportunity to seek freedom from slavery. When they applied for manumission, they provided a mini biography, which was a small slave narrative of their time of enslavement. One such example is from a fugitive from slavery in the Trucial States who sought manumission at the British Agents Office in Sharjah on 23 March 1925 (year 1343 by the Islamic calendar):

Statement made by Almas of Suwahil, aged 38. Recorded at Sharjah on 27th Shaban 1343 (= 23-3-25). "When I was 8 years old a man of Suwahil kidnapped me and sold me to a man of Khazrah of Batinah named Said. I remained with him for 3 years then he sold me to a man of Umm-ul-Qaiwain named Matful. The man engaged me in diving and after some years my master Matful died and I was transferred to his son Khalifah. Two years after the death of his father Khalifah invited a party of men of Umm-ul-Qaiwain, and asked them to give evidence to the fact that he has manumitted me for the sake of God and no one should molest me. Khalifah died and after his death his brother claimed to Hamad bin Ibrahim, Chief of Umm-ul-Qaiwain that I was his slave. The Sheikh directed us to the Sharia for a decision. My manumission was proved in Sharia Court and Sheikh Hamad heard the witnesses himself and signed the decision of the Sharia Court. Now my master’s brother is always threatening to re-enslave me. I am taking refuge with the High British Government and beg them to be kind enough to favour me with a Government Manumission Certificate so that I may be safe from threats and molestation".

These slave narratives were registered by the British Agents Office.

== Contemporary slave narratives ==
=== Nonfiction ===
A contemporary slave narrative is a recent memoir written by a formerly enslaved person, or ghost-written on their behalf. Modern areas of the world in which slavery occurs include the Sudan. Escape from Slavery: The True Story of My Ten Years in Captivity – and My Journey to Freedom in America (2003) by Francis Bok and Edward Tivnan, and Slave by Mende Nazer and Damien Lewis, describe slavery experiences in the Sudan.

=== Fictional ===
The Underground Railroad by Colson Whitehead takes place in an alternative version of the 19th century. Cora, a slave on a cotton farm in Georgia escapes via the Underground Railroad. The novel was well received. It was said to possess "the chilling, matter-of-fact power of the slave narratives collected by the Federal Writers' Project in the 1930s, with echoes of Toni Morrison's Beloved" and could be considered as a modern-tale fictional slave narrative.

== Neo-slave narratives ==
A neo-slave narrative — a term coined by Ishmael Reed while working on his 1976 novel Flight to Canada and used by him in a 1984 interview — is a modern fictional work set in the slavery era by contemporary authors or substantially concerned with depicting the experience or the effects of enslavement in the New World. The works are largely classified as novels, but may pertain to poetical works as well. The renaissance of the postmodern slave narratives in the 20th century was a means to deal retrospectively with slavery, and to give a fictional account of historical facts from the first-person perspective.

Examples include:

- Madison Smartt Bell, All Souls' Rising (1995), first of trilogy about the Haitian Revolution
- David Bradley, The Chaneysville Incident (1981)
- Octavia E. Butler, Kindred (1979)
- Noni Carter, Good Fortune (2010), young adult novel
- David Anthony Durham, Walk Through Darkness (2002)
- Ernest J. Gaines, The Autobiography of Miss Jane Pittman (1971)
- Alex Haley, Roots: The Saga of an American Family (1976)
- Marie-Elena John, Unburnable (2006)
- Edward P. Jones, The Known World (2003)
- Toni Morrison, Beloved (1987)
- William Styron, Confessions of Nat Turner (1967)
- Natasha Trethewey, Native Guard (2006)
- Margaret Walker, Jubilee (1966)
- Sherley Anne Williams, Dessa Rose (1986)
- Évelyne Trouillot, The Infamous Rosalie (2003)
- Manu Herbstein, Ama: A Story of the Atlantic Slave Trade (2001)
- Manu Herbstein, Brave Music of a Distant Drum (2011)
- Colson Whitehead, The Underground Railroad (2016)

== See also ==
=== Literature ===
- African-American literature
- Caribbean literature

=== Other ===
- Unchained Memories—HBO documentary with readings from slave narratives (2003)
- "Born a slave"
