= Turnage =

Turnage is a surname. Notable people with the surname include:

(Charles Scott Turnage) (1948-1988) United States Army, Awarded Silver Star, April 13th 1967 For Gallantry in Action.

- Allen H. Turnage (1891–1971), United States Marine Corps General
- Frederick E. Turnage (1936–2011), North Carolina city councillor and former mayor of Rocky Mount
- Jean A. Turnage (1926–2015), Chief Justice of the Montana Supreme Court
- Mark-Anthony Turnage (born 1960), English composer of classical music
- Sheila Turnage (fl. 2010s), American author
- Thomas K. Turnage (1923–2000), Major General and head of the Veterans Administration, husband of Poni Adams
- Wallace Turnage (1846–1916), escaped slave leaving behind a narrative that was published in the 2000s
- William Turnage (1942–2017), American conservationist and manager of Ansel Adams
