= Biography of a Slave =

1875 book by Charles Thompson

- Author: Charles Thompson
- Publication date: 1875

Biography of a Slave: Being the Experiences of Rev. Charles Thompson is an early record of the experience of slavery, or "slave narrative" in the American south. It was published in 1875, and has been extensively cited by present-day historians studying slavery. Thompson describes in detail his childhood experiences as a slave. The work has been described as a "witness text", written to provide a historical record of experience.

== Summary ==
Charles Thompson, an African-American born in Atala County, Mississippi, writes about his life as a slave. Thompson relates events which happened when he was about nine years old, after his owner, a man named Kirkwood, died. Kirkwood had owned many plantations, including the one where Thompson was born near a town called Rockford. Slaves on the plantations were being separated to prevent them from revolting or attempting to escape. At age thirty-seven his mother died. Ben, his uncle, hid from his owners so he could stay with his wife. He evaded the bloodhounds and even the owners walking through the cabin to try to find him when he was just hiding in a hind passage close to his wife. He finally surrendered when his owner agreed that he could be with his wife on another plantation.

Thompson goes on to describe his life as an adult slave, including being hired out to other plantations and teaching Christianity to his fellow slaves.

== The author ==
Charles Thompson was born near a town called Rockford, on March 3, 1833. His family belonged to a man named Kirkwood, a large slave owner with many different plantations. Thompson later became a preacher in the United Brethren Church.
