= John M. Washington (slave) =

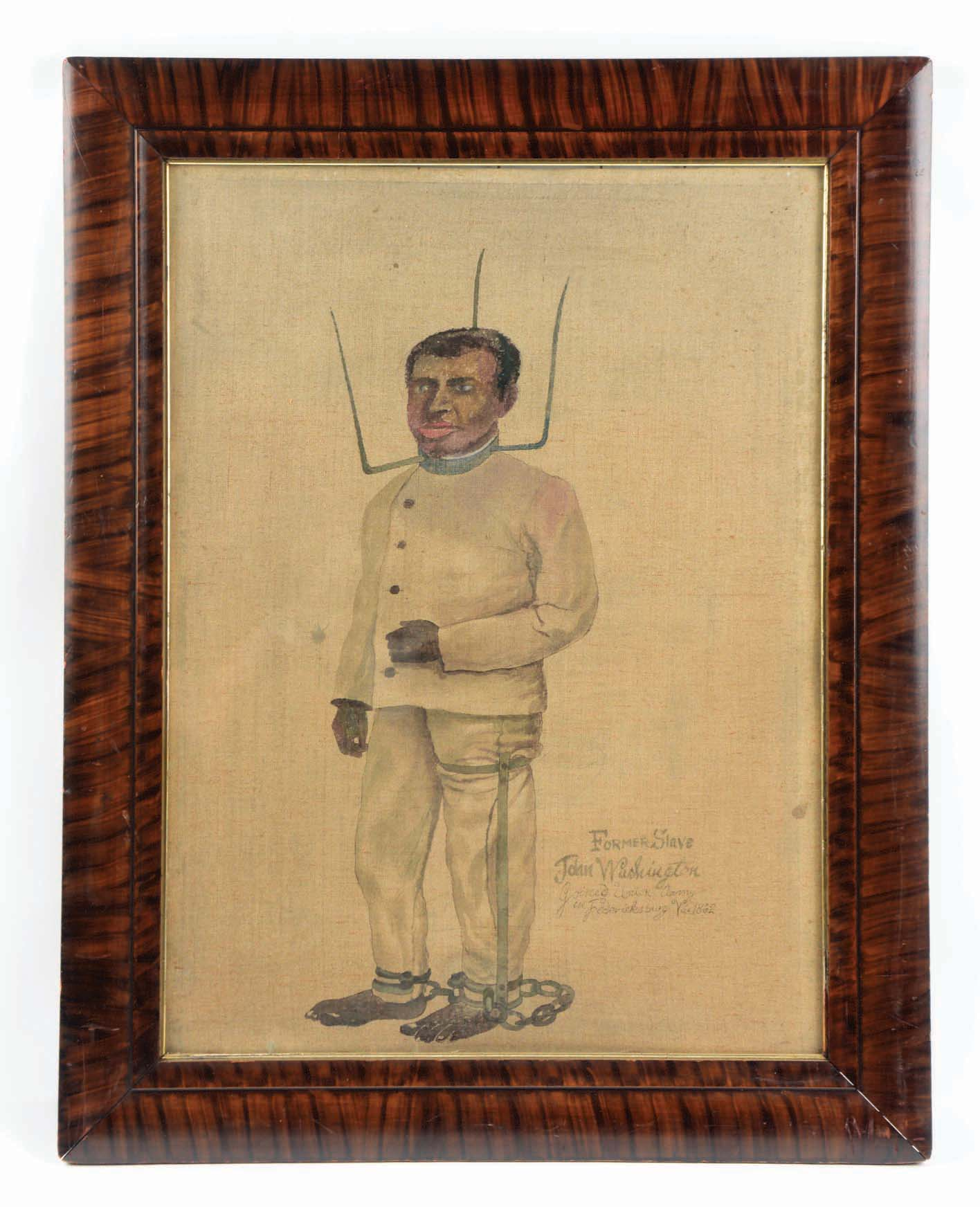
Oil on fabric. Titled lower right: "Former slave/John Washington / Joined Union Army / in Fredericksburg, Va. 1862". Probably 20th century work by Antonio Romano.

John M. Washington (May 20, 1838, Fredericksburg, Virginia – 1918, Washington, D.C.) was an American slave who was literate. After the American Civil War, he wrote one of the few slave narratives.

== Early life ==
He was born into slavery in Fredericksburg. His mother, Sarah, was rebellious and tried to escape several times during his childhood. The first time, she was punished by being hired out for a time as a field hand. Despite the hardships, she took the time to teach him to read and write. The second time she was caught trying to escape, she was separated from her family. A cruel headmaster of a boarding school, Dr. Rev. Phillips of Stuart Hall School, took her as his personal servant. After a sickness, Washington was briefly reunited with his mother in Staunton. However, he was sent back after a couple of weeks to Fredericksburg after Washington did not respond to Phillips' harsh discipline. Later, he would recall that he learned the "cruelty of the white man" while at Stuart Hall.

== Civil War ==
Soon after he returned to Fredericksburg, the Civil War broke out. When the Union temporarily occupied Fredericksburg in April 1862, Washington obtained his freedom. He was able to spy for a while for the Union Army. One of his biggest accomplishments as a spy was the outing of the Southern spy Belle Boyd. After the Union Army retreated, he was forced to escape to Washington, DC, leaving behind his wife; she later followed him.

== Post-war ==
After the end of the war, Washington penned one of the few escaped slave narratives, Memorys [sic] of the Past, in 1873. In 2007, Civil War historian David W. Blight published A Slave No More: Two Men Who Escaped to Freedom, Including Their Own Narratives of Emancipation, the two men being Washington and Wallace Turnage.

Washington died in his son's house in 1918. His family still lives in Washington, D.C.

== See also ==
- Education during the slave period in the United States

== Bibliography ==
- David W. Blight (2007). A Slave No More: Two Men Who Escaped to Freedom, Including Their Own Narratives of Emancipation. Houghton Mifflin Harcourt. ISBN 978-0-15-101232-9.
