= Kilekwa =

Kilekwa is a surname. Notable people with the surname include:

- Naomi Kilekwa (born 1984), Malawian politician
- Petro Kilekwa (late 1860s/early 1870s–1967), Zambian Anglican priest
