= Fula Americans =

Americans of Fula descent

Fulbe Americans
Template:Fulbé Americanabé
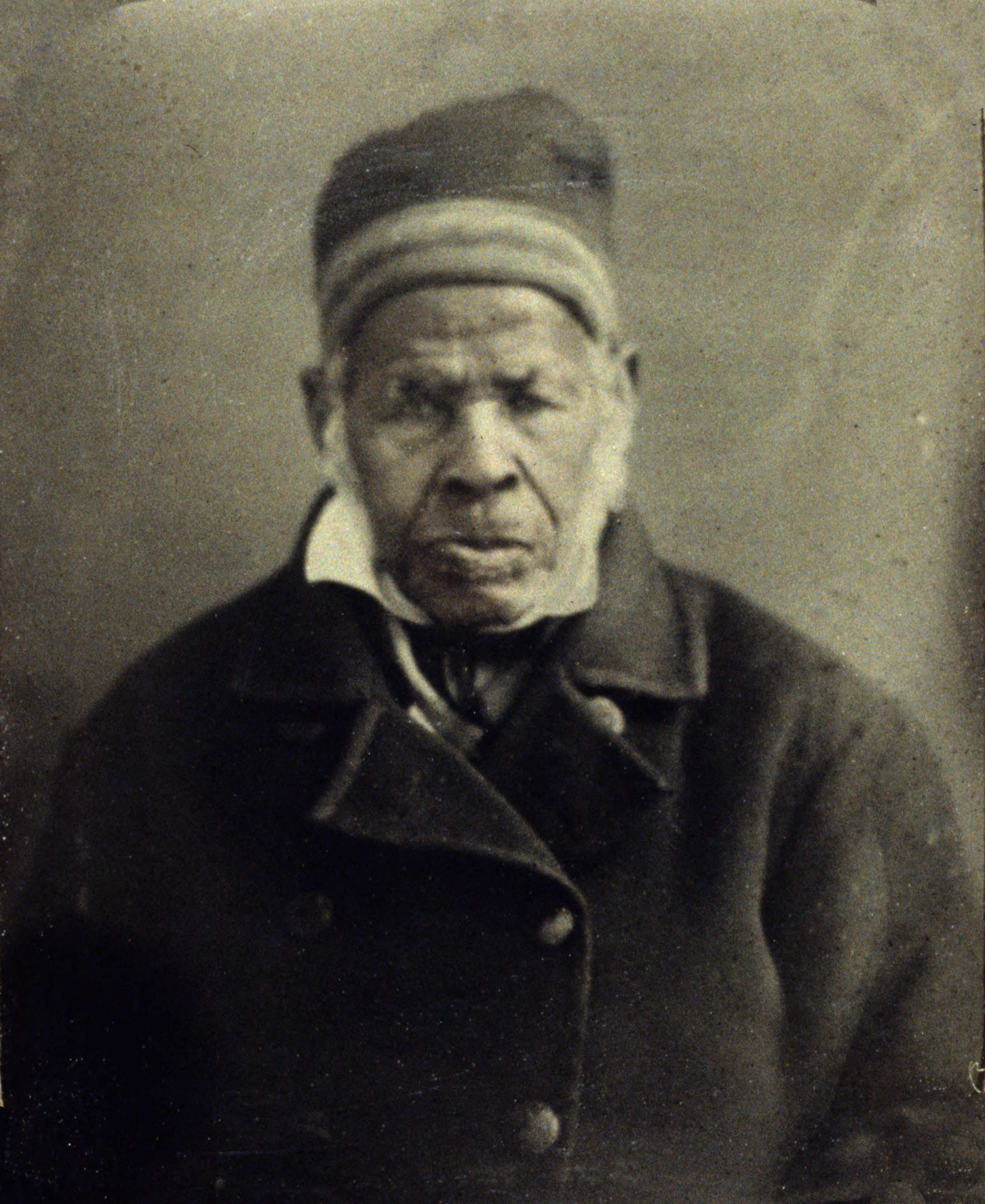
- Omar ibn Said

Total population
- 21,000

Languages
- English, French, Fulfulde, Arabic

Religion
- Islam

Fulbe Americans, Fulani Americans or Fula Americans are Americans of Fulbe (Fulani, Fulbe) descent.

The first Fulani people who were forcibly expatriated to United States from the slave trade came from several parts of West and Central Africa. Many Fulbe came of places as Guinea, Senegal, Guinea-Bissau, Sierra Leone, Nigeria and Cameroon. Recent Fulani arrivals immigrated to the United States during the 1990s and now make up a significant portion of the Muslim communities across America.

== Notable people ==
- Abdul Rahman Ibrahima Sori
- Ayuba Suleiman Diallo
- Hamidou Diallo
- Ira Aldridge
- Omar ibn Said
- Yarrow Mamout
- Bilali Mohammed – author of the Bilali Document

== See also ==
- Fula Christians
