= Born a slave =

Archaic phrase

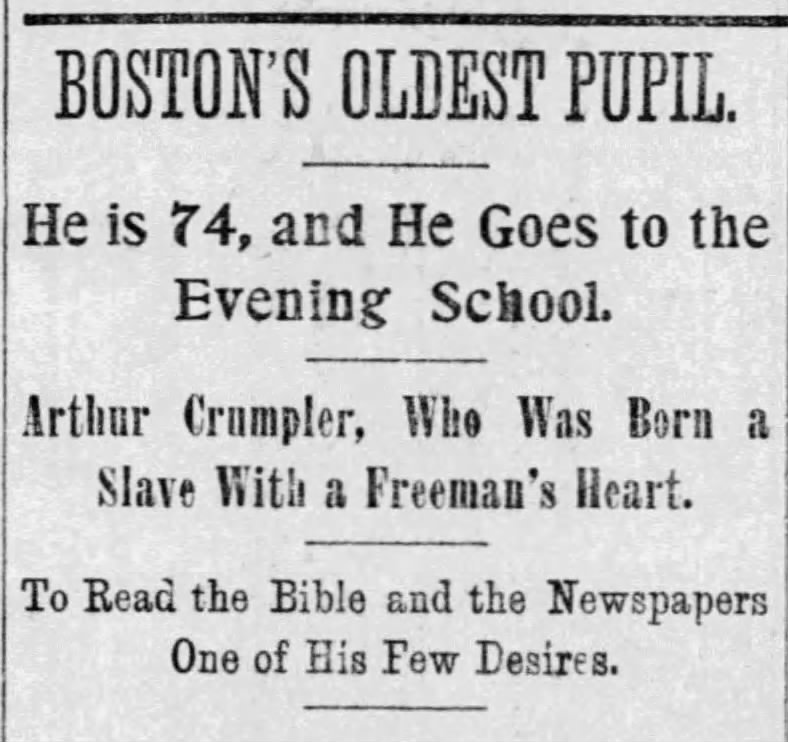
Arthur Crumpler, a formerly enslaved blacksmith born in Virginia, who had worked for the US Army as a contraband during the American Civil War and experienced wage theft because he could not read, was attending night school in Boston in 1898

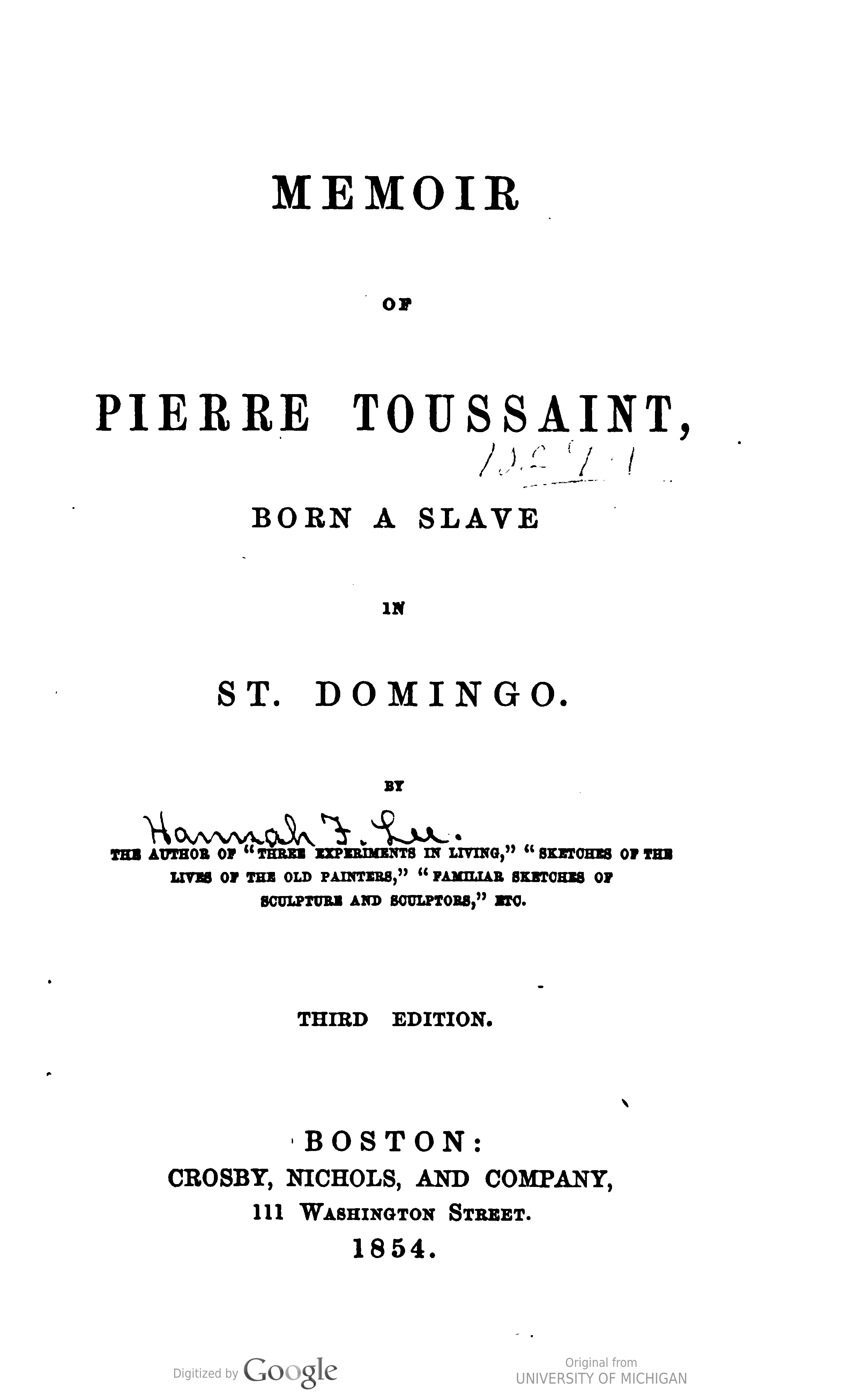
Memoir of Pierre Toussaint: Born a Slave in St. Domingo (1854) is a slave narrative that uses the phrase born a slave as part of the title.

Born a slave is an archaic stock phrase that was commonly used to describe people born enslaved under the system of chattel slavery in the Western Hemisphere but eventually granted legal personhood, either through escape, lawsuit, manumission, or mass emancipation. The phrase was used for both self-identification and by external narrators.

Over time, however, civil rights activists began to resist the use of the term as a fundamental misunderstanding of the inalienable rights of humanity. For example, in a 1916 homage to AME Church founder Richard Allen, a coreligionist wrote

It is said that Richard Allen was born a slave. That is untrue. No man is born a slave, and certainly Allen was not... Richard Allen, we say, was not a slave. No man owned his body, no man owned his soul, no man owned his thoughts. Richard Allen was not a slave. No man could enslave his soul, though one might have title to his body... Richard Allen was one of God's princes, noble in thought and great in action. This is illustrated by the fact that while still a slave in name, his word was everywhere taken at the very highest value. His word was indeed his bond.

Similarly, a 1908 obituary for Blind Tom concluded

It is true that "Blind Tom" was born a slave, deformed and black, to use the words of Henry Watterson. But within him was a soul that while living expressed itself by the Heaven-born Maid of Melody and charmed thousands of people during his lifetime, white and black alike; a soul that during life created sentiment for the Negro on earth, and one that will live in a world without end.

In a contemporary guide to writing about slavery, the NAACP of Culpeper, Virginia, advises: "No one was 'born a slave'; instead people were born with 'free' or 'slave' status" conferred upon them involuntarily.

In response to American law that automatically enslaved the children of the enslaved, the African American poet George M. Horton wrote in the early 19th century:

Alas! and am I born for this,
To wear this slavish chain?
Deprived of all created bliss,
Through hardship, toil, and pain?

Come, Liberty, thou cheerful sound,
Roll through my ravished ears;
Come, let my grief in joys be drowned,
And drive away my fears.

== See also ==
- Why Born Enslaved!
