= Solomon Bayley =

African American freed slave and writer

Personal details
- Born: c. 1771 Kent County, modern Delaware
- Died: c. 1839 Liberia

Solomon Bayley (c.1771—c. 1839) was a formerly enslaved African American who is best known for his 1825 autobiography entitled A Narrative of Some Remarkable Incidents in the Life of Solomon Bayley, Formerly a Slave in the State of Delaware, North America. Published in London, it is among the early slave narratives written by enslaved people who gained freedom before the American Civil War and emancipation. Bayley was born into slavery in Delaware. After escaping and being recaptured, he bought his freedom, including his wife and children. He worked as a farmer and at a sawmill. In their later years, he and his wife emigrated in 1827 to the new colony of Liberia, where he worked as a missionary and farmer. His short book about the colony was published in Delaware in 1833.

== From slavery to freedom ==
Bayley is believed to have been born about 1772 into slavery in Kent County, in what is now the state of Delaware). As with many African Americans who lived in the United States during the 19th century, neither his birth nor death were recorded in the U.S.; Bayley died in Liberia. Scholars such as Henry Louis Gates Jr. have made rough estimates of Bayley's birth and death years based on his autobiography and related materials. Bayley learned that his maternal grandmother was born in Guinea, where she was captured at the age of eleven, sold into slavery, and transported to the Thirteen Colonies in 1690. She had fifteen children in total.

Bayley's mother had thirteen children while the same family enslaved them. When a daughter of the family married a man from Delaware, she took Bayley's mother and father Abner, and the rest of the family with her to Delaware. After some time, they moved back to Virginia, and Bayley's family was widely dispersed in sales, with his father, sister Margaret, and brother Abner taken to Long Island in the West Indies and sold to Abner Stephen. His mother escaped with a young son and finally reached New Jersey. It was eighteen years before Bayley saw her again after he had gained his freedom.

Bayley was held in Delaware and trained as a cooper. Although the state legislature had passed a law forbidding the sale of enslaved people in Delaware to other states, in 1799, Bayley was sold as a young man to a man from Virginia. Bayley had already, since enslaved people could not marry, informally married Thamar, an enslaved woman on another Delaware plantation, and they had a nine-month-old son. His new enslaver took him to Virginia, but Bayley escaped as he was being transported there. He returned to Delaware, where he was briefly reunited with his wife, but knew he could not stay. He moved on to Dover and then to Camden, Delaware. After a time, his enslaver recaptured him.

Bayley sued in a Delaware court for his freedom, saying he had been illegally sold out of state. While the case was in court, his enslaver agreed to let Bayley buy his freedom for $80 (~$1,935 in 2025). As noted, his wife Thamar and their infant daughter Margaret were owned by another Delaware planter. Bayley first "hired out" his wife (with their child) from her enslaver, paying for her time to keep her with him. He worked to save money to buy her outright; and he paid her enslaver about $103 (~$2,931 in 2025) dollars.

After gaining their freedom, Bayley and his wife worked as tenant farmers. He started work in a sawmill to earn more money. Their son Spence had been sold earlier and was auctioned at a sale in 1813 after his enslaver's death. Prices had risen, and Bayley despaired of being able to buy him, but white men who knew Bayley from the Methodist church aided him in buying his son's freedom, at a price of more than $360 (~$10,244 in 2025).

As their children grew, Bayley apprenticed them to "good families" so that they could learn skills and gain an education. About this time, Bayley also arranged for his mother to come to them from New Jersey, and she lived with him to "a great age", as her mother had done.

In 1820, Bayley met Robert Hurnard, a Quaker and abolitionist from Essex, England, who was visiting Delaware. After hearing his life story, Hurnard encouraged Bayley to write about it and publish an account. He corresponded with Bayley for years afterward, and Hurnard wrote a preface for the memoir published in London in 1825.

In 1821, both Bayley's oldest and youngest daughters died, Margaret and Leah, respectively, several months apart; they were in their early 20s. In each case, he wrote about their faith in their last days.

== Emigration to Africa ==
Bayley learned about Paul Cuffee, a wealthy African-American shipbuilder in Boston, Massachusetts, who promoted free blacks emigrating to Africa. This idea appealed to Bayley, but Cuffee died before the project began.

In this period, the American Colonization Society was established in 1817 to encourage free blacks to emigrate to a colony established as Liberia in West Africa in the antebellum years. It was supported by both enslavers and abolitionists, who thought for different reasons that free blacks might have more opportunities in a society in Africa. Its members helped to support transportation costs for free blacks, and in the early years states such as Virginia and Maryland contributed to resettlement. While most free African Americans wanted to make their lives in the United States with rights that recognized their citizenship, some did emigrate.

Bayley and his wife Thamar were among them, going in 1827 after their children were grown. He served as a Methodist missionary and worked as a farmer. They lived near the main settlement of Monrovia. In 1833, he published a book about the colony, describing its products and society. In it, he expressed an ambivalent attitude toward the African natives, describing them as "benighted" and in need of Christianity. Still, he was also hopeful about the potential autonomy of African Americans in the colony.

== Enslaved people using the courts ==
In the 19th century, African Americans petitioned various levels of government on multiple issues. When necessary, they used the courts. Numerous individuals addressed the topics of personal freedom and economic discrimination in their appeals. To explain his thinking about using the legal avenues open to him, Solomon Bayley wrote: "I thought where the law made liberty the right of any man, he could not be wrong in trying to recover it." Bayley threatened to take his enslaver to court for transporting his family out of state and immediately selling them on arrival in Virginia. He was successful in gaining an out-of-court settlement that included his enslaver's accepting an arrangement whereby he could buy his freedom over time.

Other African Americans sometimes successfully petitioned the courts to right wrongs if their enslavers violated the law. Particularly in areas on the western frontier between enslaved and free states, for instance, in St. Louis, Missouri, and Louisiana, hundreds of enslaved people filed freedom suits, challenging the grounds of their enslavement and sometimes winning freedom. The legal justifications for the institution of slavery included exceptions. Enslaved people claimed the right to freedom based on Native American ancestry (where Native American slavery had been prohibited) or on enslavers knowingly holding them in free states past the limits set by those states' laws. For decades before the American Civil War, state courts often observed a precedent of "once free, always free", until the Dred Scott ruling by the United States Supreme Court.

== Works ==
Bayley's memoir, A Narrative of Some Remarkable Incidents in the Life of Solomon Bayley (1825), is one of the earliest of the genre known as slave narratives. Published in London in 1825, it is forty-eight pages in length. It was based in part on correspondence between Bayley and Hurnard. Bayley expresses his religious faith throughout his escape, his efforts to buy freedom for himself and his family and other trials. He was a Methodist who saw his life through a Christian perspective. His escape and recapture are covered in detail.

Yolanda N. Pierce has explored Bayley's memoir and four other slave narratives from the standpoint of slave agency. A.J. Raboteau noted that she said the plot line of most of them "constitutes a picaresque journey of incredible incidents, ... all governed by Divine Providence". Referring to Pierce's account, Raboteau notes that "These narratives describe a double journey from slavery to freedom, spiritual and physical. Their rhetorical structure frequently oscillates between an interpretive perspective that is (sometimes in the same paragraph) both African and Western." Pierce says that Bayley's narrative merges African and Western belief, creating a "liminal space" for Bayley "in which he does not have to abandon one to adopt the other".

Raboteau noted that Bayley was inspired to compassion by his Christian faith, drawing from it to grapple with challenges in slavery and as a free man. For instance, he belonged to the same Methodist class meeting as his wife's enslaver, who threatened to see Thamar and Bayley's infant daughter. Bayley wrote in his memoir that it was extremely difficult

to keep up true love and unity between him and me, in the sight of God: this was a cause of wrestling in my mind; but that scripture abode with me, 'He that loveth father or mother, wife or children, more than me, is not worthy of me; then I saw it became me to hate the sin with all my heart, but still the sinner love; but I should have fainted, if I had not looked to Jesus, the author of my faith'...

In 1833 Bayley published his "A Brief Account of the Colony of Liberia", based on his emigration to the African colony and worked there as a missionary. According to Raboteau, he expressed the "ultimate ambiguity", that "his duty as a Christian was to bring religion to the 'benighted' regions of Africa, while choosing to emigrate there as a true place of freedom, removed from the hell of American slavery."

== See also ==
- List of slaves

== Sources ==
- Bayley, Solomon (1825), A Narrative of Some Remarkable Incidents in the Life of Solomon Bayley, Formerly a Slave in the State of Delaware, North America, London: Harvey and Darton; posted at Documenting the American South, University of North Carolina
- Bayley, Solomon (1833), "A Brief Account of the Colony of Liberia", Wilmington, Delaware
- Dalleo, Peter T. (1997), "THE GROWTH OF DELAWARE'S ANTEBELLUM FREE AFRICAN AMERICAN COMMUNITY", in A HISTORY OF AFRICAN AMERICANS OF DELAWARE AND MARYLAND'S EASTERN SHORE, edited by Carole Marks, Wilmington, Delaware: University of Delaware, 1997. Retrieved 2007-07-13
- Gates, Henry Louis; Higginbotham, Evelyn Hooks, African American Lives, Oxford University Press US, 2004, ISBN 0-19-516024-X
- Newton, J. E. (1997), "BLACK AMERICANS IN DELAWARE: AN OVERVIEW", in A HISTORY OF AFRICAN AMERICANS OF DELAWARE AND MARYLAND'S EASTERN SHORE, edited by Carole Marks, Wilmington, Delaware: University of Delaware, 1997; Retrieved 2007-07-13
- Pierce, Yolanda. Hell Without Fires: Slavery, Christianity, and the Antebellum Spiritual Narrative, University Press of Florida, 2005; analysis of five early slave narratives, including that of Solomon Bayley
- Raboteau, A. J. (2002), "The African American Witness to the Sacred Gift of Life", Lecture at the Orthodox Peace Fellowship Conference, June, St. Tikhon's Monastery, South Canaan, Pennsylvania; Retrieved 2007-04-17.
- Raboteau, A. J. (2005), "Response to Papers on" Survival, Resistance, and Transmission: New Historiological and Methodological Perspectives for the Study of Slave Religion, in The North Star, Volume 8, Number 2; Retrieved 2007-08-18
