= Portrait of Yarrow Mamout =

1819 painting by Charles Willson Peale

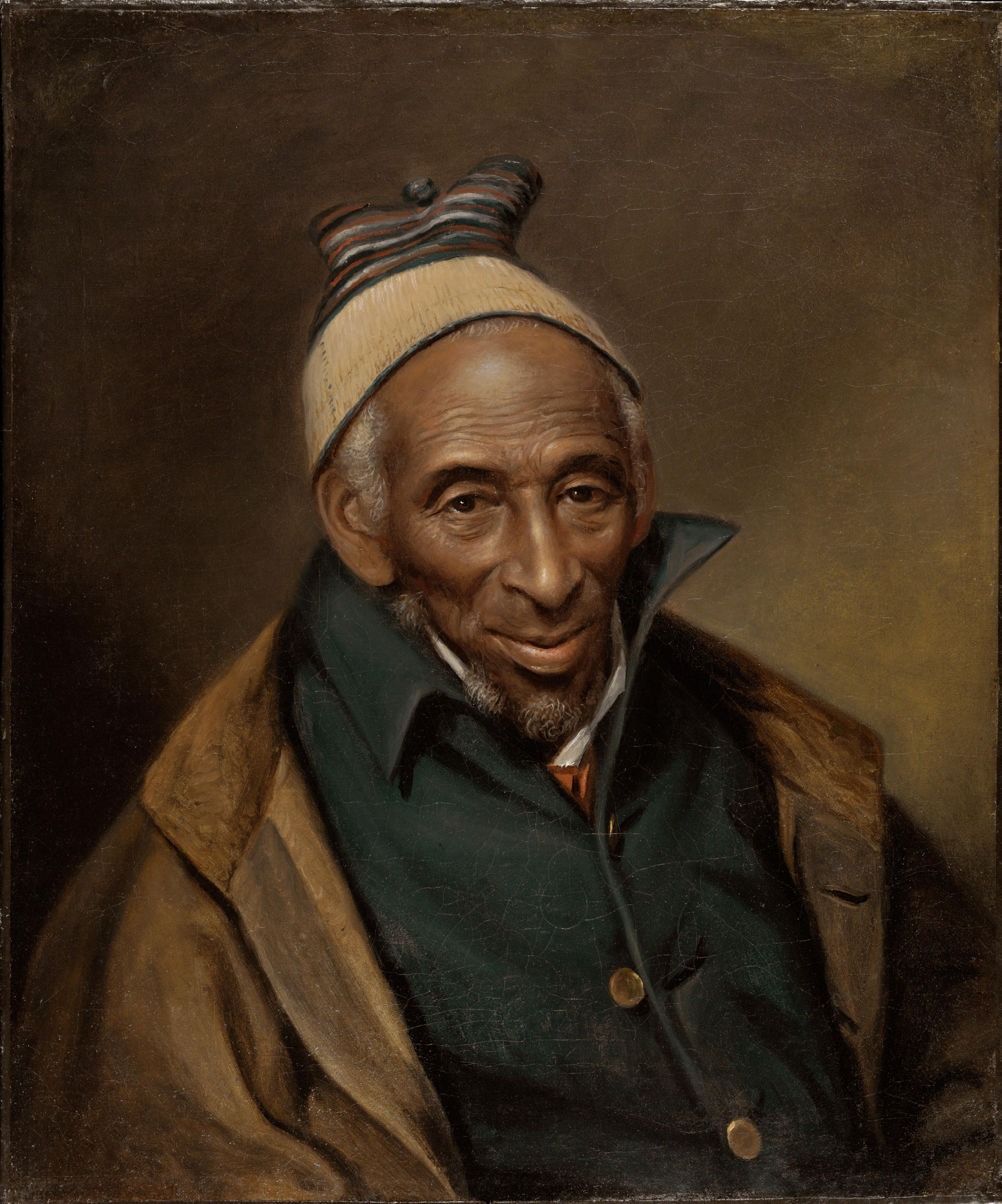
- Scan by Philadelphia Museum of Art
- Artist: Charles Willson Peale
- Year: 1819
- Subject: Yarrow Mamout
- Dimensions: 61 cm × 50.8 cm (24 in × 20.0 in)
- Location: Philadelphia Museum of Art
- Accession: 2011-87-1

Portrait of Yarrow Mamout is a portrait painting of Yarrow Mamout created by Charles Willson Peale in 1819. It is currently housed in the Philadelphia Museum of Art.

== Background ==
Charles Willson Peale was an American painter and museum founder who specialized in portraiture, painting over a thousand works in his lifetime. Yarrow Mamout was a formerly enslaved Guinean financier who lived in Georgetown, Washington, D.C. Soon after he had arrived in Washington D.C. from Philadelphia in November 1818, Peale was first made aware of Yarrow through Peale's nephew Joseph Brewer.

== Composition ==
Peale created the entire painting over the course of day, from January 30 to 31, 1819. The painting depicts a slouching Yarrow dressed in a greatcoat and a woolen hat with a cheerful expression.

== Provenance ==
27 years after Peale had died in 1827, his museum was dissolved and the painting of Yarrow, then misidentified as George Washington's slave William Lee, was sold to Charles S. Ogden for six dollars. Ogden later gave the painting to the Historical Society of Pennsylvania in 1892. In 1947, historian Charles Coleman Sellers, a descendant of Peale, corrected the identity of the sitter to Yarrow. In 2011, the Philadelphia Museum of Art acquired the artwork, where it is still kept.
