= Yarrow Mamout =

Guinean-American entrepreneur and property owner

- Mamadou Yarrow
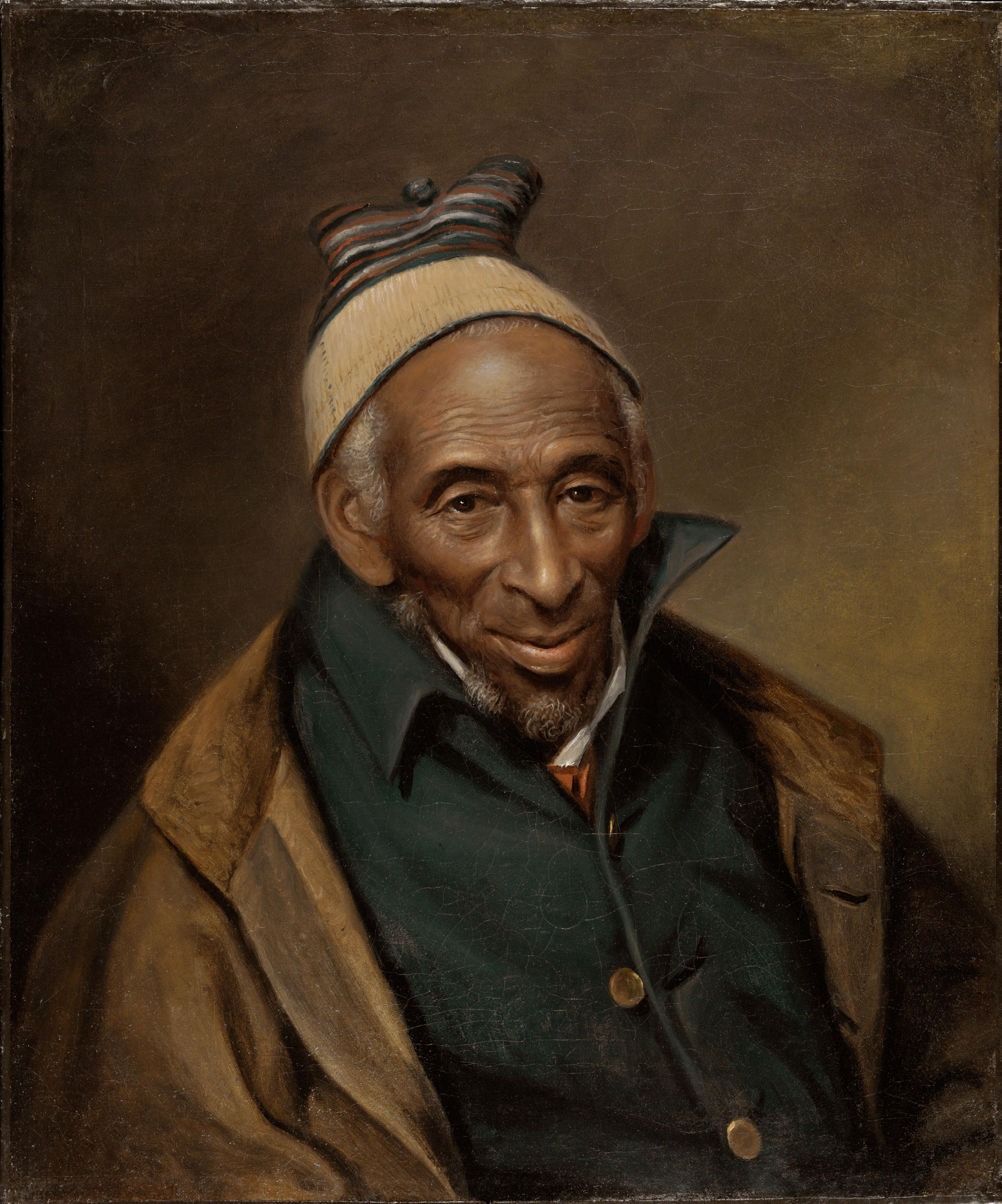
- Portrait of Yarrow Mamout by Charles Willson Peale, 1819
- Born: c. 1736; Guinea, West Africa
- Died: January 19, 1823 (age about 86); Georgetown, Washington D.C., United States
- Occupation: Entrepreneur

Yarrow Mamout, natively known as Mamadou Yarrow (c. 1736 – January 19, 1823), was a Guinean freedman, entrepreneur, and property owner in Georgetown, Washington, D.C. An educated Fulani Muslim, he gained his freedom in 1796 after 44 years held in bondage. James Alexander Simpson and Charles Willson Peale painted his portrait, Peale's being held in the Philadelphia Museum of Art.

== Early life ==
Yarrow was born in Guinea, West Africa, circa 1736. His birth name was probably Mamadou Yarrow (the name Yarrow Mamout was popularized through the diary of his portraitist, Charles Willson Peale). During the Atlantic slave trade, he was captured and enslaved, and taken to Annapolis, Maryland, from Guinea in 1752 on the slave ship Elijah. A member of the Fulani people, he spoke the Fula language and could read and write Arabic and rudimentary English. Historians believe that he came from a wealthy and educated Muslim family.

== Slavery ==
Upon his arrival in Maryland, Yarrow was sold to Samuel Beall, who owned a plantation in Takoma Park. He became Beall's house slave and later served his son, Brooke. By 1790, Yarrow had moved with Beall to Georgetown and begun hiring himself out for wages. According to contemporary sources, Beall required him to turn over wages he earned during the day but allowed him to keep wages he received for nocturnal work. He became a jack of all trades, working as a brickmaker, charcoal burner, basket weaver, cart driver, and stevedore, working long hours to earn enough money to buy his freedom.

After 44 years in slavery, Yarrow was freed at the age of 60 when Brooke Beall died in 1796, manumitted by his owners who believed he was too old to work anymore. He immediately spent £20 to buy and free his seven-year-old son, Aquilla, who had been born into slavery on a neighboring farm. Little is known of the boy's mother.

== Freedom ==
Yarrow amassed savings of $200 and became one of the first investors in the successful Columbia Bank of Georgetown. In 1800, he purchased a lot located at 3324 Dent Place NW in Georgetown, valued in a tax assessment at $30. He constructed a log house on the land. By 1816, the property had an assessed value of $500 (~$12,214 in 2025). Yarrow lived quietly on the dividends of his bank stock. He remained a devout, lifelong Muslim, praying regularly and avoiding the consumption of pork and liquor.

On March 23, 1821, Yarrow loaned $170.85 (~$4,132 in 2025) to a white merchant named William Hayman to help purchase a warehouse. Hayman defaulted on the loan after Yarrow's death, but Nancy Hillman, the daughter of Yarrow's sister, sued to recoup the loss in 1843. She received $300 from the foreclosure and sale of the warehouse in 1850.

Yarrow died on January 19, 1823, at the approximate age of 86. According to his obituary, penned by Charles Willson Peale, he was buried in the corner of his yard where he was accustomed to praying; however, a 2015 archaeological dig failed to unearth any remains. Peale's obituary was published in the Gettysburg Compiler and was reproduced in 38 newspapers across the United States, testifying to the unique life story of the enslaved African Muslim turned entrepreneur and property owner.

== Descendants ==
Two years after his father's death, Aquilla purchased a farm in Washington County, Maryland, and moved there with his wife, Mary "Polly" Turner, a midwife and former slave. The community of Yarrowsburg, Maryland, was named in her honor. Her great-grandnephew, Robert Turner Ford, graduated from Harvard University in 1927.

== Portraits ==
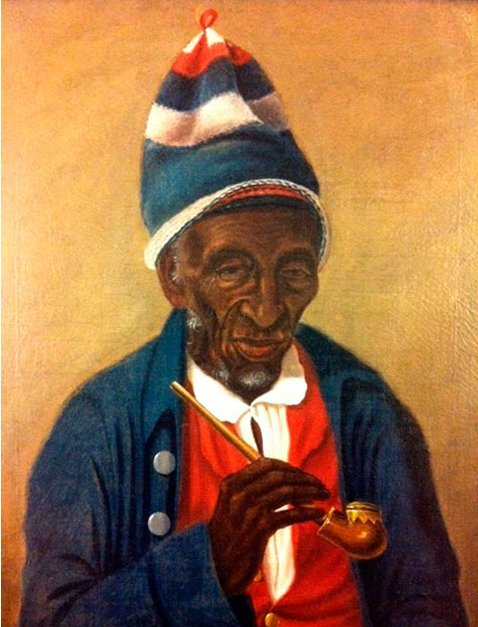
Portrait of Yarrow Mamout by James Alexander Simpson

There are two known portraits of Yarrow, painted by James Alexander Simpson and Charles Willson Peale. Painted in 1819, Peale's portrait showed Yarrow at the age of 83, though rumor put his age at 134. Simpson painted Yarrow's portrait in 1822. They are held in the permanent collections of the District of Columbia Public Library (Simpson) and the Philadelphia Museum of Art (Peale). Simpson's was exhibited at the National Portrait Gallery in 2016. In this portrait, Mamout wears a hat resembling a kufi.

== See also ==
- Omar Ibn Said
- Ayuba Suleiman Diallo
- Fula Americans
- Islam in the United States
- Trans-Saharan slave trade
