= Jacob D. Green =

Jacob D. Green (August 24, 1813 – unknown) was an African-American writer and lecturer. Born into slavery in Maryland, he wrote a slave narrative after escaping from his enslaver in 1848.

== Childhood ==
Jacob was born into slavery with 113 other slaves on a plantation in Queen Ann's County, Maryland, with only his mother as family. Judge Charles Earle put Jacob to work at age eight running chores and giving water to the other slaves. When Jacob was twelve, his mother was sold to a trader, and all he said about his mother was that she was a good slave. Similar to Mr. Cobb's saying, she said if you did what you're told and stay out of trouble your master would treat you well. Five years later he caught a white boy stealing from him and when they got into a fight, a man by the name of Mr. Burmey came in and broke up the fight beating Jacob and threatening to cut off his hands for hitting a white boy. This triggered a deep hatred within Jacob and when he finally got the chance, he managed to replace Mr. Burmey's smoking tobacco with gunpowder. No one ever suspected him of the deed, and he got his satisfying revenge.

== Adulthood ==
In Jacob's later years he did many "awful" things, but also made daring choices that would lead to his freedom. Jacob at one point in time stole a couple of sweet potatoes, his master found out and ordered him to deliver a letter which he was sure contained an order to lash him. Instead of going himself he found himself a loophole and got one of the other slaves to deliver the letter in his place, this caused the other man to be beat while he avoided it. However bad it was for his friendships, it certainly was beneficial to his welfare. Later (time unspecific), he left the barn door open and allowed eight of his masters horses escape on purpose. When his master questioned him later, he convinced his master that the other slaves must have done it. He was utterly convincing and his master believed him, and then set out to punish the other slaves. Although this caused Jacob personal pain for the suffering he caused his fellow slaves, he did not speak up.

Eventually Jacob fell in love with a slave girl named Mary, who was evidently not in love with him and had another lover named Dan. Jacob told her that if she didn't give up Dan and love him he would proceed to hang himself, Mary didn't care. He took a rope and pretended to string himself up, standing on a stool. He tried many ways to convince her he was dying but she took no interest. When he was finally ready to give up, a dog came out of nowhere and knocked the stool out from under him. Now that he was truly hanging, and unable to free himself, he called out for help in genuine fear. She sat sadistically and watched him slowly dying. After howling and yelling eventually the strength in his arms couldn't hold the rope off any longer and he blacked out. When he came to, Mary's master; a doctor stood over him. He never knew who cut the rope. Shortly after this, one of Mr. Burmey's sons forced himself on Mary. Her screams brought Dan onto the scene and without thinking, Dan plunged a pitchfork into the son's back killing him almost instantly. Realizing what he had done, Dan ran away into the nearby woods. After confessing to her master, Mary died that same day after drowning herself. A bounty of 1000 dollars was placed on Dan's head. Two months later, he was caught and taken to former Mr. Burmey's other two sons, Peter and John. The two brothers tied him down and burned him alive, slowly cooking him in a pile of crudely placed wood. In the same year both brothers incidentally perished in a fire, they were drunk as usual and locked themselves into a barn. That night the barn caught ablaze and devoured them, in an attempt to save her son's Mr. Burmey's wife broke into the barn, was struck on the head by a piece of falling timber and joined her boys in their fate. At age 20, Jacob's master had him marry another one of the slave girls. Five months after the marriage, she gave birth to a white boy. When Jacob inquired who the father was, she told him it was the master. Nonetheless, they were a happy couple and lived together for six years, having a total of two children. When the master's wife died, he sought the doctor's daughter to be his future wife. When they got married, she ordered any female slave who had ever been intimate with the master to be sold. Jacob was out running errands when his wife was sold, along with both their children.

== Bibliography ==
- Green, Jacob D. (1864). Narrative of the Life of J. D. Green, a Runaway Slave, from Kentucky, Containing an Account of His Three Escapes, in 1839, 1846, and 1848. Huddersfield: Henry Fielding.
