= James Alexander Simpson =

American painter

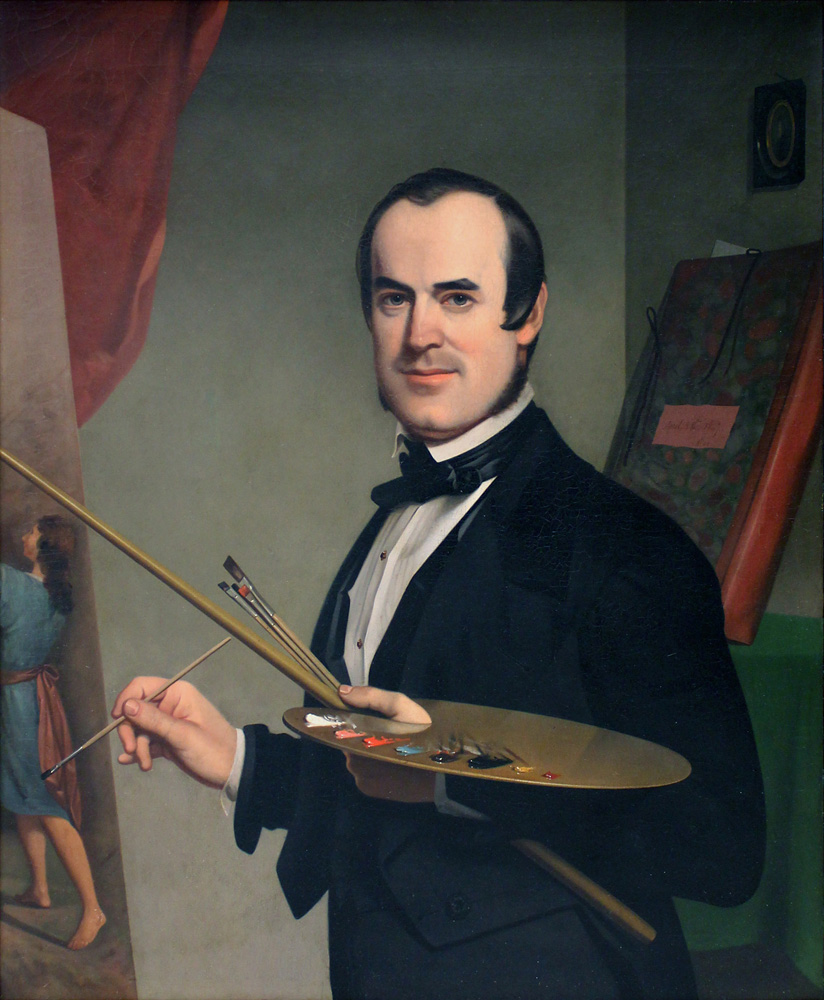
Self-Portrait, oil on canvas, 1847, in the collection of Georgetown University

James Alexander Simpson (1805 – May 1, 1880) was an American painter, best remembered today for his long association with Georgetown University.

== Life ==
Simpson was born in Georgetown, D.C. The details of his training are unknown. He embarked early on an artistic career; a letter by George Templeman to the Boston Athenaeum, written in August 1831, details the process by which he copied a portrait of the Marquis de Lafayette by Ary Scheffer some years previously, working in part from a live sitting with the Marquis. Beginning in 1830 he taught drawing and painting at Georgetown College, remaining on the faculty until 1865. In 1853 he showed his work at the Washington Metropolitan Mechanics Institute. He married twice; his first wife was Julia Franzoni, daughter of either Carlo or Giuseppe Franzoni, while his second, Sarah T. Gibson, was widow of the artist Richard R. Gibson. He moved to Baltimore in 1865, dying in that city fifteen years later.

== Work ==
Simpson has been described as a "primitive" painter, whose style is yet "sophisticated and not at all bombastic". He was active primarily as a portraitist, counting among his subjects William Henry Harrison, Stephen Decatur, and Georgetown cabinetmaker William King, Jr. His existing likenesses are generally considered quite characterful, and show a distinct artistic growth between his earlier and later works. His later paintings, too, show an awareness of the focus on Americana then coming into vogue in the broader artistic community. Reference is made in an obituary to historical and religious paintings, but none of these are known to have survived.

Simpson is well-remembered for his time teaching at Georgetown University; five landscape depictions of the campus which he produced in the late 1820s and early 1830s have been prominently displayed in Carroll Parlor and the president's office, and are used as the basis of advertising posters for the school. Other works in the university's art collection include portraits of Stephen Decatur, George Washington, and Francis Neale; a trompe-l'œil bookcase titled Library Door; and a self-portrait, dated 1847, which was accessioned from his heirs in 2009. Also in the collection is an engraved depiction of the Georgetown Observatory after Simpson's work.

Perhaps Simpson's most notable work is his portrait of Yarrow Mamout, done in 1822 amid rumors that Mamout was a centenarian. Long displayed in the Peabody Room of the Georgetown branch of the District of Columbia Public Library, it was placed on long-term loan to the National Portrait Gallery in 2016. The Gallery owns his 1840 portrait of George Shoemaker Inspecting Flour for the Port of Georgetown. Three portraits by Simpson, those of Rachel Bartholomew Davis, Thomas Davis, and Mary Ellen Stonestreet Hoffar, are owned by the Smithsonian American Art Museum. A pendant to the Mamout portrait, depicting "Guinea Sarah", is known to have existed at one time, but is currently unlocated; were it to be found, it would be the only extant oil painting of an African-American woman who was brought to America on a slave ship.
