= Greensbury Washington Offley =

American slave narrative author

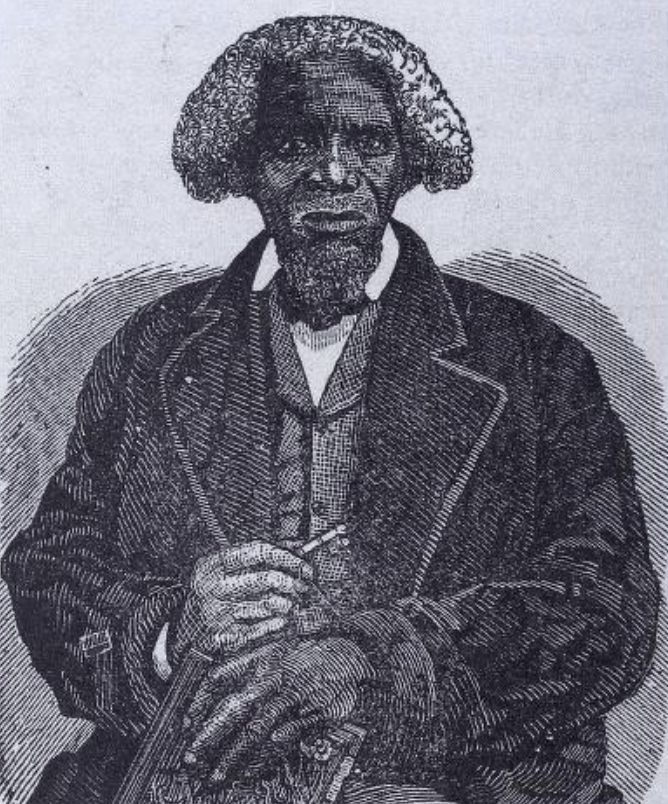
- Born: December 18, 1808; Centerville, Maryland, US
- Died: March 22, 1896 (aged 87); New Bedford, Massachusetts, US
- Occupation: Minister
- Writing career
- Pen name: G. W. Offley
- Language: English
- Subjects: Autobiography, slave narrative
- Notable works: A Narrative of the Life and Labors of the Rev. G. W. Offley, a Colored Man, Local Preacher and Missionary (1859); God's Immutable Declaration of His Own Moral and Assumed Natural Image and Likeness in Man (1875)

Greensbury Washington Offley (December 18, 1808 – March 22, 1896) was an American slave narrative author and minister. Born into slavery in Maryland and eventually freed, Offley wrote A Narrative of the Life and Labors of the Rev. G. W. Offley, a Colored Man, Local Preacher and Missionary (1859), one of only six slave narratives published in Connecticut.

== Early life ==
Offley was born into slavery in Centreville, Maryland, to a free black man from Maryland and an enslaved woman from Virginia (names unknown). Their master freed Offley's mother and ordered Offley and his sister to be freed at age 25. However, the master's heirs destroyed a codicil to the will that required Offley's younger brother be similarly freed at 25. Offley's father therefore purchased all three children as well as Offley's grandmother, braving murderous threats from their master's heirs. The heirs backed off, however, when Offley's mother threatened to cut her children's throats rather than see them enslaved.

The Offleys struggled economically as the family grew to five more children. Offley's father hired out Offley from the age of 9 to make brooms, weave baskets, chop wood, and gather oysters. He received no formal education but learned to read at the age of 19, taught by an itinerant black preacher and by a slaveholder's son whom he taught to wrestle and box. When Offley moved to Saint Georges, Delaware and began working in a hotel, a young white boy taught him to write in exchange for food.

== Preaching and writing ==
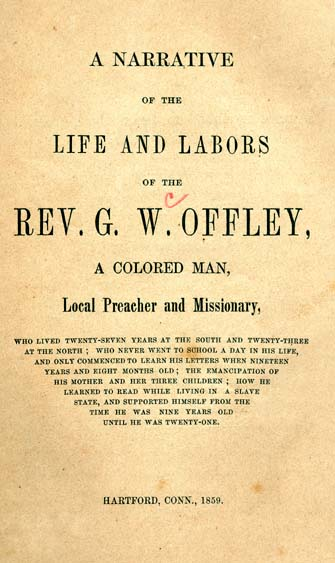
Cover of Offley's autobiography

In his 20s, Offley began moving north, working for railroads and hotels along the way. On November 15, 1835, he arrived in Hartford, Connecticut. On February 21, 1836, he had a conversion experience and became a Methodist Episcopal preacher. Between 1847 and 1849, he fundraised across Massachusetts and Connecticut for the Colored Methodist Zion Society to establish the Worcester Zion Church on Exchange Street. He also aided the Worcester Female Mutual Relief Society.

In 1850, Offley returned to Hartford as pastor of the Belknap Street Church, working alongside luminaries such as minister James W.C. Pennington and educator Ann Plato. In 1859, he wrote an autobiographical pamphlet recounting his youth up to his conversion. Printed by Case, Lockwood and Company of Hartford, A Narrative of the Life and Labors of the Rev. G. W. Offley, a Colored Man, Local Preacher and Missionary was endorsed by influential white ministers, including Horace Bushnell. Its generally "conciliatory" tone, regional audience (only 1000 copies were printed), and religious overtones made it a "relatively minor slave narrative."

In 1866, Offley was recorded as soliciting donations from the New England black community to fund church missionary work among the freedman in the border states. In 1867, Offley moved to New Bedford, Massachusetts, where he authored and published a short religious treatise entitled "God's Immutable Declaration of His Own Moral and Assumed Natural Image and Likeness in Man" (1875). Offley lived quietly on his farm for the rest of his life, dying on March 22, 1896. He was buried in Oak Grove Cemetery.

== Personal life ==
Offley married twice while living in Connecticut. In 1837, he married his first wife, Ann Offley, who died in the 1850s. He married Elizabeth Offley (born 1840) by 1860 according to census records. Little is known about either of his wives, and he had no known biological children. He did adopt one daughter, Adelaide Brown (1857–1927), whose mother was a Nipmuc.
