= Louis Hughes =

American author (1832–1913)

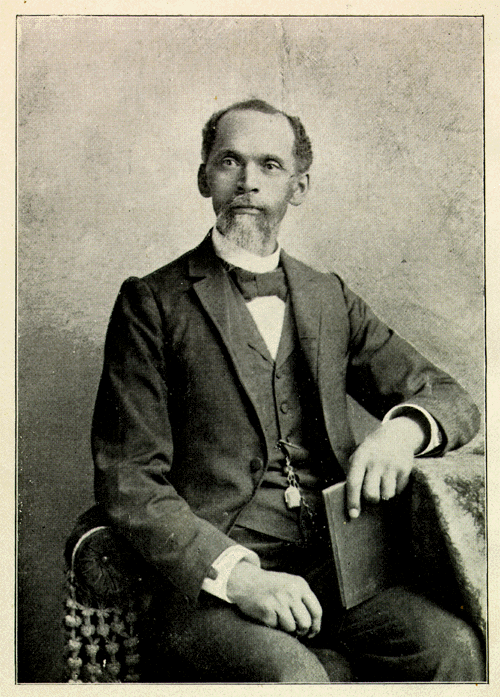
- Born: c. 1832
- Died: 1913
- Spouse: Matilda Hughes

Louis Hughes (c. 1832–1913) was an African-American slave born in Virginia. He is the writer of the memoir Thirty Years a Slave.

== Biography ==
Hughes was born in about 1832 to a Euro-American plantation owner and an African-American slave mother in Charlottesville, Virginia. He was a slave for over thirty years, spending most of that time in Tennessee. During that time, he learned in secret how to read and write. Thirty-three years after gaining freedom at the end of the Civil War, he wrote his memoir Thirty Years a Slave, published in 1897. It is considered an essential text for understanding the experience of slavery in western Tennessee.

== Early life ==
When Hughes was six years old, he was separated from his mother and sold in a Virginia slave market. In 1844, Edward McGee, a wealthy Mississippi planter, purchased young Hughes as a Christmas gift for his wife. He stayed with the family for twenty years. While in his youth, he worked as an errand boy and later became the family's butler in 1850 when they built a new home outside Memphis.

Though Hughes did not work daily in field labor, he did have bad experiences with Edward's wife, Madam McGee. "Some weeks it seemed I was whipped for nothing," Hughes recalled, "just to please my mistress' fancy." Hughes and his wife Matilda had twin girls while in slavery, but due to neglect of the children caused by a dispute between the Madam and Matilda, the children died, for which Hughes blamed the Madam. The conflict between Matilda and the Madam occurred because Matilda wished to sell her twins to a new enslavers in hopes that they would be able to survive, but Edward and the Madam refused to allow her to do so. Matilda was also unable to produce breast milk to nourish her children due to the brutality that the Madam had consistently inflicted upon her body. One day, after the Madam overheard an old slave woman singing a song of freedom, the Madam exclaimed, "Don't think you are going to be free; you darkies were made by God and ordained to wait upon us."

Three of his escape attempts ended with severe beatings, the scars of which he bore for the rest of his life, he said, on his body and soul. His fifth attempt was a success, in June 1865, the same month the Confederacy surrendered in his state.

== Free life ==
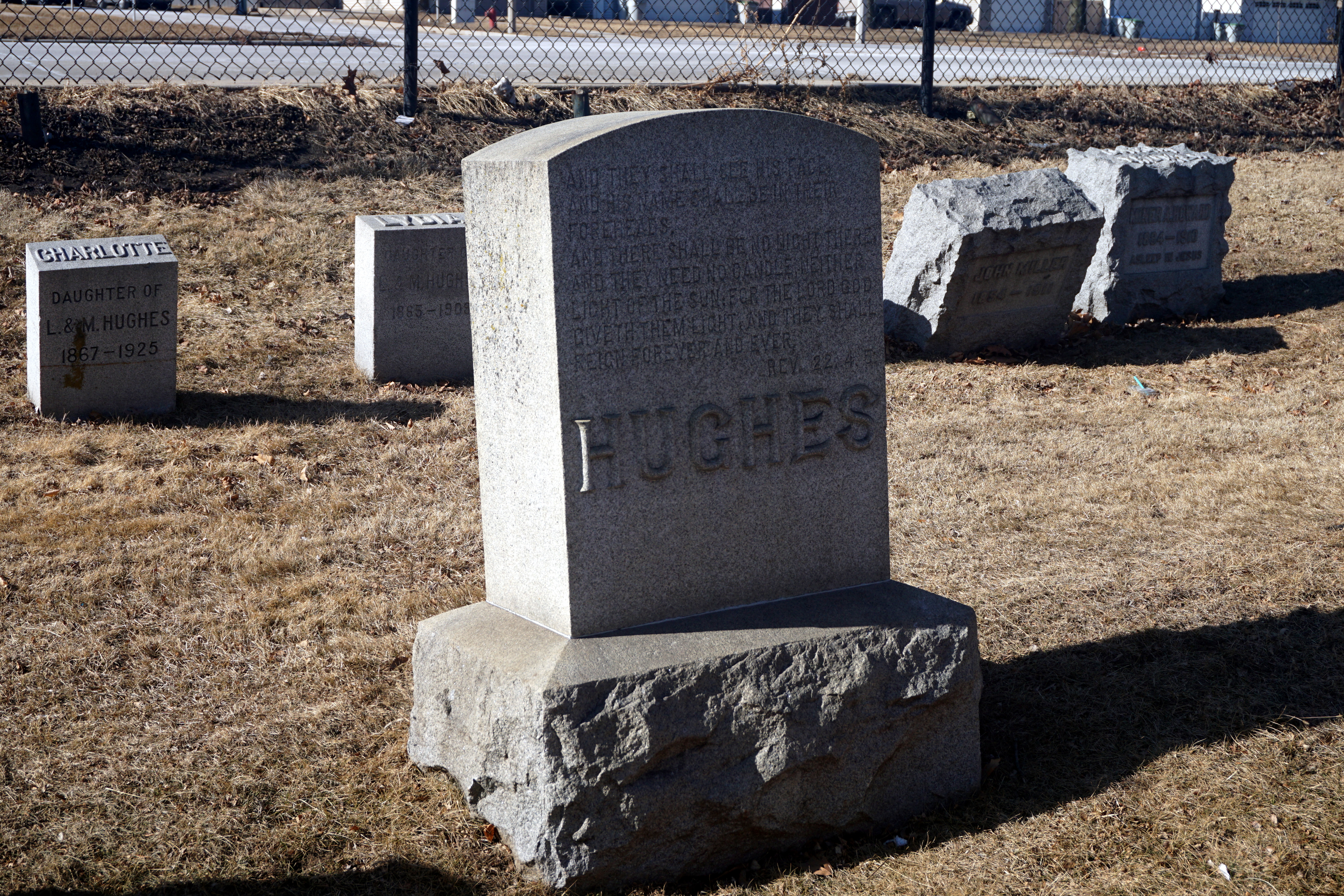
Matilda and Louis Hughes graves at Forest Home Cemetery

Hughes settled in Milwaukee with his wife Matilda, the cook from the McGees' household who escaped with him. Together they started a successful laundry business. From his learned medical experience from McGee, during his time as a slave, he pursued a career in nursing. In 1897, his autobiography was published and became an important source documenting a slave's perspective. By 1905, he was described as a janitor. In addition to the two children who died in and as a result of slavery, they had four more children born free, three girls and one boy.

Hughes died in Milwaukee 1913 and is buried at Forest Home Cemetery next to Matilda. His original house in Milwaukee on 9th Street was still standing as of 2020, but was unmarked, boarded up and "not long for this world".
