= Francis Moore (geographer) =

18th-century British travel writer

Francis Moore (baptized 1708, died in or after 1756) was a British travel writer of the 18th century.

Moore was born in Worcester, England, but few details are known about his early life. He came into prominence after publishing Travels into the Inland Parts of Africa in 1738. The abolitionist Thomas Clarkson attributed his commitment to the anti-slavery cause to reading the few experts on Africa of the time, including Moore.

== Account of Africa ==
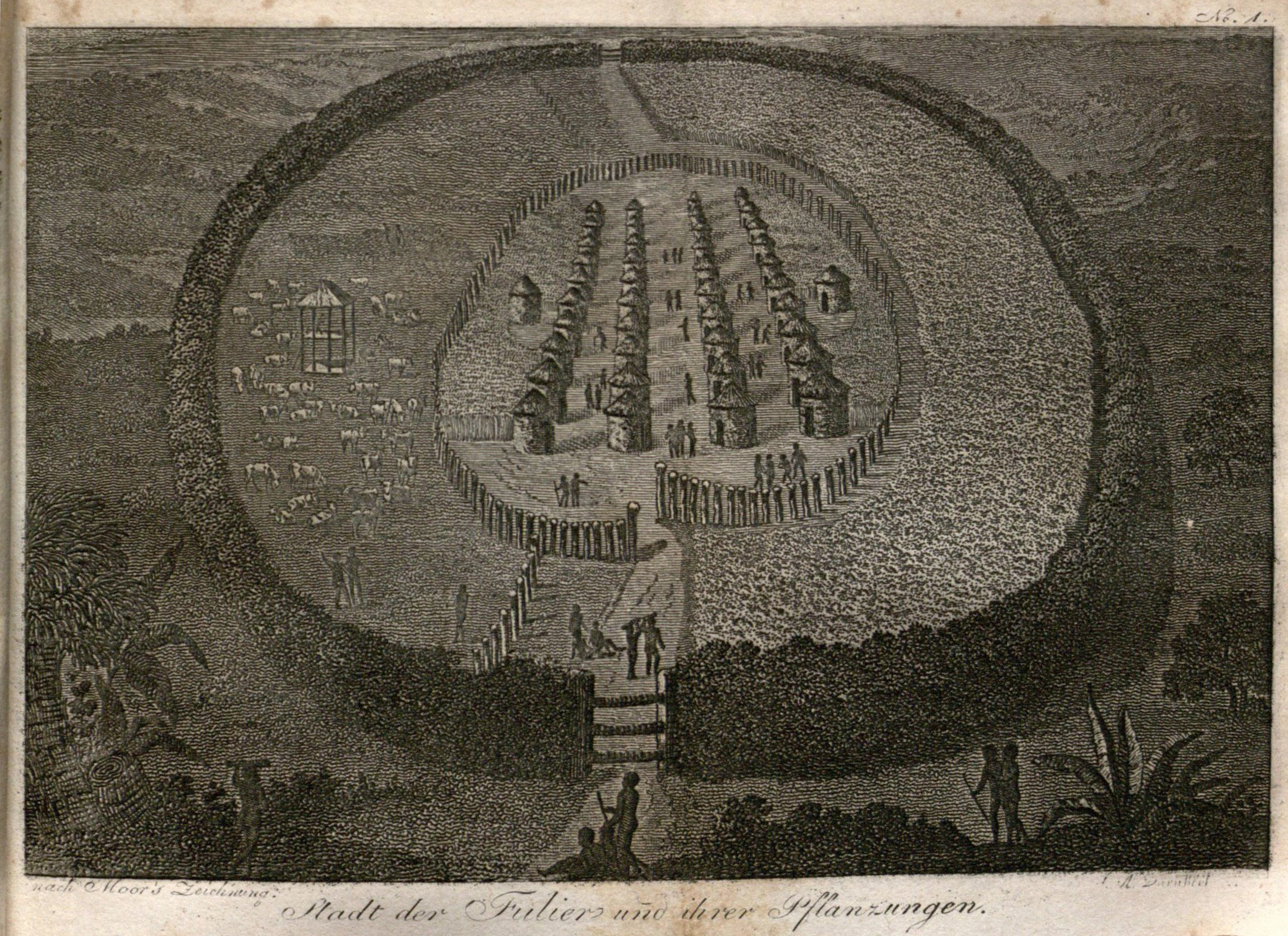
Fula Village and its Agricultural Products, unknown author after Francis Moore, 1802

Moore was appointed a writer (i.e., clerk) by the Royal African Company in 1730 and sailed for the company's Gambia River entrepôt on July of that year. He left the region in April 1735 after also serving as a factor (agent) for the company. Moore was one of the first Englishmen to travel into the interior of Africa, serving in and visiting numerous towns and trading posts along the Gambia River from its mouth to the Guinea Highlands, hundreds of miles inland.

Moore's observations were published as Travels Into the Inland Parts of Africa. The short account describes in rich detail the physical and cultural geography of the region before the intensification of the Atlantic slave trade and the resulting depopulation and economic disintegration. Moore's work and Richard Jobson's The Golden Trade were the only detailed accounts of Gambia before the colonial period.

Excerpts from Travels Into the Inland Parts of Africa were published in several subsequent volumes on exploration and the slave trade, including Samuel Johnson et al., The World Displayed (1740); Thomas Astley’s A New General Collection of Voyages and Travels (1745); and Elizabeth Donnan’s Documents Illustrative of the Slave Trade to America (1931).

== Association with Job ben Solomon ==
Moore related the saga of Job ben Solomon, also known as Ayuba Suleiman Diallo, in Travels Into the Inland Parts of Africa. Job was an African aristocrat taken by slavers in 1730 in an incident recorded by Moore. He was enslaved in Maryland until 1733, when he was sent to England after James Oglethorpe received a letter from him and purchased his freedom. After becoming well-known and respected in London society, Job returned to the Gambia, where he became re-acquainted with Moore.

== Account of the Georgia Colony ==
Moore sailed to the Province of Georgia in November 1735, only four months after returning to England from Gambia, with James Oglethorpe and over 200 colonists. It was a return trip for Oglethorpe, who had founded the colony in February 1733. Among those also on the voyage were newly ordained brothers John and Charles Wesley.

Moore served as Oglethorpe's secretary, and as storekeeper at Fort Frederica on the southern frontier of the Georgia colony. He served in the colony until 1743, visiting his homeland once before permanently returning to England the same year as Oglethorpe.

Moore’s early observations in the colony were published under the title A Voyage to Georgia. The account contains some of the most detailed information available on the Oglethorpe Plan and its implementation. Moore’s account of Georgia is silent on Oglethorpe’s emerging anti-slavery position; however, it seems likely that the two men discussed Africa and the slave trade at length, and this may have informed the latter’s views.

== Bibliography ==
- "Francis Moore." Oxford Dictionary of National Biography online edition (accessed March 9, 2016).
- Grant, Douglas. The Fortunate Slave. Oxford, UK: Oxford University Press, 1968.
- Hill, Matthew H. "Towards a Chronology of the Publications of Francis Moore’s Travels into the Inland Parts of Africa." History in Africa. 19 (1992): 353-68.
- Moore, Francis. A Voyage to Georgia. London: Jacob Robinson, 1744.
- Moore, Francis. Travels Into the Inland Parts of Africa. Second Edition. London: D. Henry and R. Cave, 1738.
- Wilson, Thomas D. The Oglethorpe Plan: Enlightenment Design in Savannah and Beyond. Charlottesville, Va.: University of Virginia Press, 2012.
