= Frederick E. Turnage =

Frederick E. Turnage (1936-2011) is the former mayor of Rocky Mount, North Carolina. Born in Rocky Mount, Turnage was educated by Rocky Mount City Schools and Wake Forest University, where he received his baccalaureate degree in 1958 and his jurisdoctorate in 1961. Later that year, Turnage was admitted to the North Carolina State Bar and began to practice law with a local firm in Rocky Mount. He was appointed Assistant Clerk of Superior Court of Nash County before he began the private practice of law at 149 North Franklin Street, where he maintained his law practice until his death.

Turnage was elected to the Rocky Mount City Council in 1971, and the following year he was named Mayor Pro Tem. Turnage was first elected Mayor of Rocky Mount in 1973, becoming the youngest person to hold that position. In 2003, Turnage was reelected to an unprecedented ninth consecutive term as Mayor of Rocky Mount; Turnage did not seek a tenth term of office, and left office in December 2007, replaced by David Combs, the first new mayor in 34 years.

Turnage was a past President of the North Carolina League of Municipalities, a role that highlighted his commitment to the interests of local governments. Turnage remained actively involved in community activities and organizations, several of which bestowed their highest honors upon Turnage.

He died on August 1, 2011, after a long battle with pancreatic cancer.
