= Thomas Bluett =

British judge

Thomas Bluett (c. 1690—1749) was a British clergyman and judge in Annapolis, Maryland.

Bluett gained lasting renown by his encounter with an enslaved muslim prince from Africa, Ayuba Suleiman Diallo (anglicised to Job Ben Solomon), in 1731. While in jail in Annapolis, Diallo was visited by Thomas Bluett. Bluett arranged to take Diallo to England and they set off in March 1733. En route, Diallo learnt some English, and in England Bluett and Diallo met up with Diallo's benefactor James Oglethorpe, of the Royal African Company. Diallo was provided lodgings in Limehouse, London, and also spent time visiting Bluett's country house in Cheshunt, Hertfordshire.

Bluett wrote Ayuba's biography "Some Memoirs of the Life of Job, the Son of Solomon, the High Priest of Boonda in Africa; Who was a Slave About Two Years in Maryland; and Afterwards Being Brought to England, was Set Free, and Sent to His Native Land in the Year 1734", which was published in London 1734. Bluett died in 1749.
