= Ama: A Story of the Atlantic Slave Trade =

Historical novel by Manu Herbstein

- First edition (print on demand)
- Author: Manu Herbstein
- Publication date: December 1, 2000
- ISBN: 978-1-585-86932-9

Ama: A Story of the Atlantic Slave Trade is the debut historical novel by Manu Herbstein (born 1936). It has been described as a work of faction that "successfully blends extensive and meticulous research with abundant imagination to transport the reader into the violent world of the Atlantic Slave Trade."

The book won the 2002 Commonwealth Writers' Prize for the Best First Book from Africa.

== Publication history ==
- 2005, Picador Africa, 374 pages, ISBN 1-77010-003-2 (print)
- 2001, E-Reads, 456 pages, ISBN 1-58586-932-5 (print on demand)

== Reviews ==
- Reviews are collected at www.ama.africatoday.com/reviews.htm.

== Prizes ==
Herbstein won the 2002 Commonwealth Writers Prize for Best First Book from Africa, the first time the award had been given to an electronic book.
