= Ayuba Suleiman Diallo =

Senegalese prince (1701–1773)

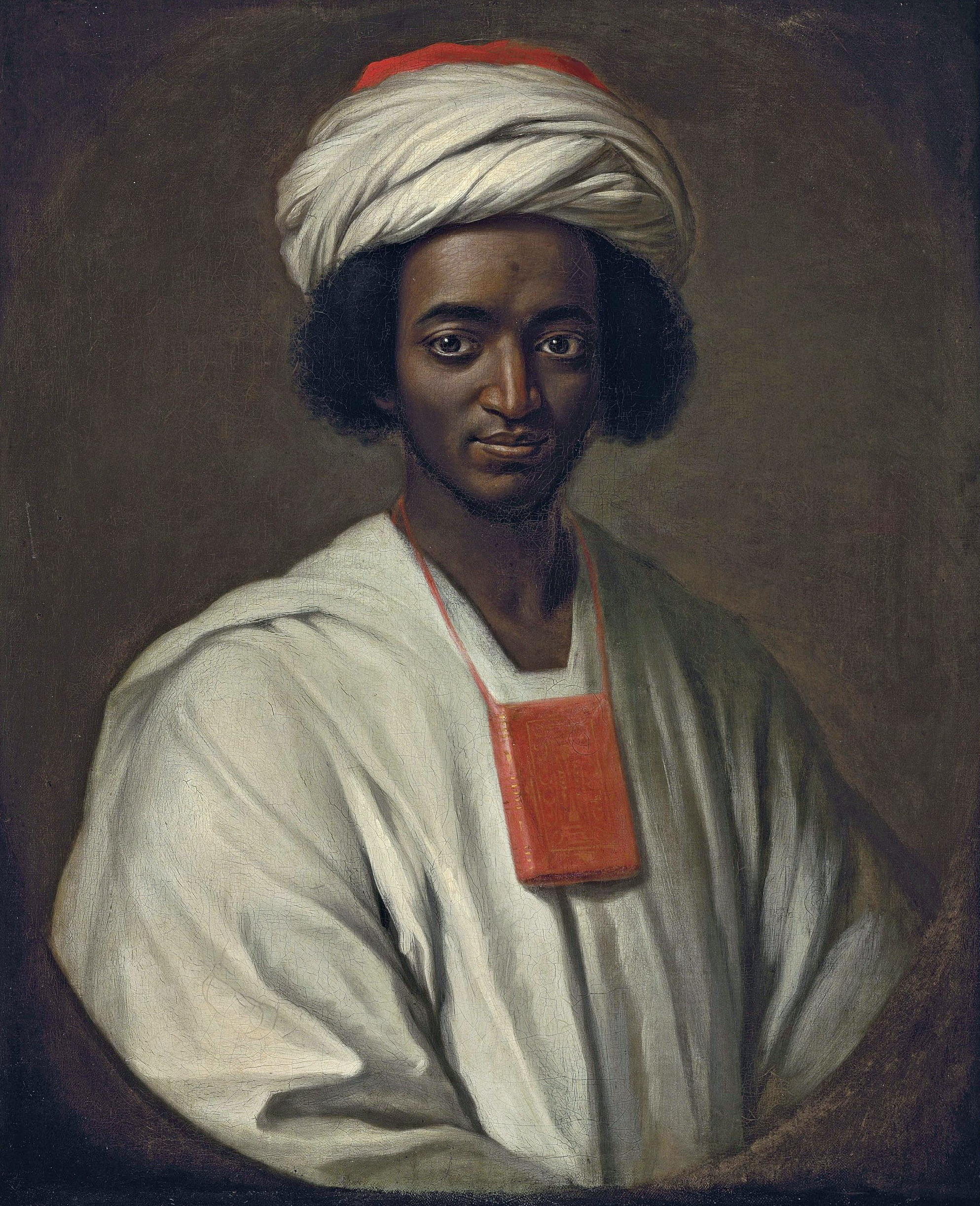
- Portrait by William Hoare, 1733

Personal life
- Born: 1701 Bundu (present-day Senegal)
- Died: 1773 (age 71–72)
- Other name: Job Ben Solomon

Religious life
- Religion: Islam
- Denomination: Sunni
- Jurisprudence: Maliki

Ayuba Suleiman Diallo (1701–1773), also known as Job Ben Solomon, was a prominent Fulani Muslim prince from Bundu in West Africa who was kidnapped and trafficked to the Americas during the Atlantic slave trade.

Ayuba's memoirs were published as one of the earliest slave narratives, in Thomas Bluett's Some Memories of the Life of Job, the Son of the Solomon High Priest of Boonda in Africa; Who was enslaved about two Years in Maryland; and afterwards being brought to England, was set free, and sent to his native Land in the Year 1734. However, this version is not a first-person account. A first-hand account of Ayuba's capture and eventual return home was printed in Francis Moore's Travels into the Inland Parts of Africa.

== Early life ==
Ayuba Suleiman Ibrahima Diallo was born c. 1701 in Bondu, (Note: Also spelled Bundu.) in present-day Senegal. His family were well-known religious leaders of the Muslim Fulbe people—Diallo's grandfather, Malik Sy, had founded Bondu, and his father, Suleiman Diallo, (Note: Also spelled Solomon or Soliman Dgiallo) was a religious and political leader. Bundu was founded during one of the early Fulani jihads against the Mandé people. Many of the Mandé people indigenous to the region were enslaved by the Fulani rulers of Bundu, such as Ayuba's father Suleiman Diallo. As a child, Ayuba was acquainted with Sambo, the prince of Futa, and the two studied the Quran and Arabic. Ayuba had married two wives who were previously his slaves and fathered several children by the end of the 1720s.

== Capture and enslavement ==
Diallo travelled to the coast in 1730, intending to purchase supplies, such as paper, and sell two Mandé (or Mandinka) slaves owned by his father to a factor working for the Royal African Company. While on the trip, Diallo and Loumein Ndiaye, a translator, (Note: Also known as Loumein Yoas.) were captured by the Mandinka in retaliation and sold into slavery.

The Mandinkas shaved the heads of Diallo and Loumein to make them appear as war captives, and thereby supposedly legitimately enslavable, as opposed to their actual condition of people captured in a kidnapping raid for the specific purpose of selling slaves for financial profit. The two men were sold to factors of the Royal African Company.

Ayuba subsequently convinced the slave ship captain, named Pike, that they had previously met when Ayuba himself was selling slaves. He convinced Pike of his high social status and explained that his father was capable of paying a ransom. Pike granted Ayuba leave to send word to Ayuba's family. A messenger was sent, but did not return in time. At the behest of Pike's superior, Captain Henry Hunt, the two captives (Ayuba and Loumein) were sent across the Atlantic to Annapolis, Maryland without further delay. Here, Diallo was delivered to another factor, Vachell Denton. At this time, his name was changed and Diallo became known as Job Ben Solomon, which is the biblical translation of his original name.

== In America ==
Ayuba was then purchased by a Mr. Tolsey of Kent Island, Maryland. Ayuba was initially put to work in the tobacco fields; however, after being found unsuitable for such work, he was placed in charge of the cattle. While in captivity, Ayuba used to go into the woods to pray. In 1731, after being humiliated by a child while praying, Ayuba ran away but was captured and imprisoned at the Kent County Courthouse. Unfortunately, Ayuba's rationale for escape was not understood until an African translator was located. Able to communicate his needs, Ayuba's owner set aside an area for undisturbed prayer upon Ayuba's return.

It was at the courthouse that Ayuba was discovered by a lawyer and Anglican priest, Thomas Bluett of the Society for the Propagation of the Gospel, who was travelling through on business. The lawyer was impressed by Ayuba's ability to write in Arabic. In the narrative, Bluett writes the following:

Upon our Talking and making Signs to him, he wrote a Line or two before us, and when he read it, pronounced the Words Allah and Mahommed; by which, and his refusing a Glass of Wine we offered him, we perceived he was a Mahometan, but could not imagine of what Country he was, or how he got thither; for by his affable Carriage, and the easy Composure of his Countenance, we could perceive he was no common Slave.

When another African who spoke Wolof, a language of a neighbouring African ethnic group, was able to translate for him, it was discovered that Ayuba had aristocratic blood. Encouraged by the circumstances, Tolsey allowed Ayuba to write a letter in Arabic to send to his father in Africa. Eventually, the letter reached the office of James Oglethorpe, Director of the Royal African Company. After having the letter authenticated by John Gagnier, the Laudian Chair of Arabic at the University of Oxford, Oglethorpe purchased Ayuba for £45.

== In England ==
According to his own account, Oglethorpe was moved with sentiment upon hearing the suffering Ayuba had endured as a slave. Oglethorpe sent Ayuba to the office of the Royal African Company in London. Bluett and Ayuba travelled to England in 1733. During the journey Ayuba learned to communicate in English. However emotionally swayed his letters claimed him to be, Oglethorpe was apparently not so conscientious as to leave instructions with the London office of the RAC concerning what to do with Ayuba upon his arrival in late April 1733.

Captain Henry Hunt (or perhaps his brother, William Hunt), one of the original factors in charge of Ayuba's enslavement, arranged for lodging in a country province. Yet Ayuba heard rumours that Hunt was planning to sell him to traders who claimed they would deliver him home. Ayuba, fearing yet more trickery, contacted Bluett and other men whom he had met en route to London. Bluett took Ayuba to his own home in Cheshunt, Hertfordshire, and promised not to sell him without letting him know. The RAC, following Oglethorpe's orders, made in part through persistent requests from interested men in London, subsequently paid all the expenses and purchase price of the bond for Ayuba. Ayuba beseeched Bluett once again, explaining that none of this guaranteed that he would not be enslaved once again. According to Bluett, all the honourable men involved had promised they would not sell Ayuba into slavery, so, though supposedly Ayuba was not under any threat, Bluett and other sympathizers paid "fifty-nine pounds, six shillings, and eleven pence half-penny" simply to ease Ayuba's anxiety. Englishmen in London and surrounding provinces who had met Ayuba collected money so that his "freedom in form", an official document seal made and sealed by the RAC. Bluett explained, "Job's Mind being now perfectly easy," he could fraternize with London's elite, obtaining many gifts and new friendships, while also being of service to Hans Sloane through his newly acquired ability to translate Arabic into English. His service to Sloane included organizing the collection of Arabic Manuscripts at the British Museum. While in England, Ayuba was in the company of many other prominent people, including the royal family and John Montagu, 2nd Duke of Montagu and his wife, Mary, Duchess of Montagu, which led to his induction into the Spalding Gentlemen's Society.

Though in England, Ayuba continued to pray regularly and observe his Islamic beliefs. He was said to have copied, by hand, the Quran three times from memory. His acquaintances made efforts to convert him to Christianity, however, gifting him an Arabic version of the New Testament. Ayuba was already familiar with the Christian belief system, agreeing with the role of Jesus as prophet, but he refuted the concept of the holy Trinity. He considered his monotheistic perception of religion to be incompatible with the Christian belief in "the father", "the son", and "the holy spirit". He found the term "trinity" is not mentioned in the New Testament. He also advised against assignment of human images to God's name, and for this reason, displayed a particular disdain for Roman Catholicism and what he regarded as its characteristic worship of idols.

In July 1734, Ayuba freely returned to the Gambia and later returned to his homeland. Of this, Bluett recaps:

About the latter End of July last he embark'd on Board one of the African Company's Ships, bound for Gambia, where we hope he is safely arrived, to the great Joy of his Friends, and the Honour of the English Nation.

However, Ayuba found that his father had died, and one of his wives, presuming that Ayuba had perished, had remarried. His homeland was ravaged by war, but being a prosperous individual, he was able to regain his old lifestyle.

His memoirs were published by Bluett in English and French. Ayuba was an extremely rare exception in the slave trade. Due to his education and wealth, he was able to escape legally the hardships of slavery and return home to Africa.

Ayuba faced later hardships, however. In June 1736, he was imprisoned or held as a parolee by the French. He may have been targeted by the French because of his alliances with the British. He was held perhaps for a year until local countrymen secured his release. He later sent letters to the London RAC to be given transit to visit London, but this request was turned down. Ayuba continued to press his acquaintances in London for Loumein's freedom. Due to Ayuba's commitment and the help of Bluett, Loumein was eventually released from slavery and returned to the Gambia region in 1738.

Ayuba's death was recorded in the minutes of the Spalding Gentlemen's Society in 1773.

== Portrait ==
A portrait of Diallo, wearing West African traditional clothing, by William Hoare of Bath was painted in 1733. Diallo, an Islamic scholar of aristocratic background, maintained his faith despite living in a Christian majority environment. He is depicted wearing a Quran around his neck and bearing a prayer mark on his forehead—evidence of his devout practice. Previously known only from a print, the original painting was purchased by the Qatar Museums Authority (QMA) at Christie's in November 2009.

The UK government imposed a temporary export bar on the painting because of its importance to British history and culture. The National Portrait Gallery, London launched an appeal to raise £554,937 to prevent its export. Most of this money was provided by the Heritage Lottery Fund and the Art Fund, and the Gallery launched a public appeal for the remaining £100,000. The money was raised to buy the work but the QMA agreed to lend it instead.

== See also ==
- List of enslaved people
- Trans-Saharan slave trade
