= Wallace Turnage =

American writer (1846–1916)

Wallace Turnage (c. 1846 – 1916) was an enslaved African American who recounted his story of repeatedly trying to escape brutal slaveowners before escaping to Union Army lines. He moved to New York City with his family and lived in economic poverty. He wrote a narrative about his life. It was published for the first time in 2007.

He was born in North Carolina, and was the son of a fifteen-year-old female slave and a white man. He was sold multiple times and made repeated attempts to run away, and succeeded. He lived in New York and New Jersey, working as a waiter, janitor, glass blower, and finally as a watchman.

His manuscript was passed on to his daughter, Lydia Turnage Connolly (1885 – 1984). After her death, it was another 20 years before it was published. In 2007, Civil War historian David W. Blight published A Slave No More: Two Men Who Escaped to Freedom, Including Their Own Narratives of Emancipation, the two men being Turnage and John M. Washington.

A historic marker in Mobile, Alabama, reads as follows:

In 1864, Wallace Turnage, a seventeen year old slave[,] was owned by a merchant, Collier Minge, whose house stood on this site. Turnage escaped wartime Mobile by walking 25 miles down the western shore of Mobile Bay. After surviving three weeks in the Fowl River estuary, he paddled a row boat into the Bay. In late August, 1864, he was take to Fort Gaines and freed. Turnage's heroic emancipation was one of the most dramatic for African Americans in the Civil War. He later lived in New York City where he wrote his rare narrative, discovered in 2003 and published in 2007 in the book, A Slave No More. Through bravery and determination on this, his fifth attempt to escape, Turnage seized his own freedom. ¶ The African American Heritage Trail of Mobile
