= Petro Kilekwa =

African Anglican priest and former slave (d. 1967)

Petro Kilekwa and some of his pupils, photo published 1949

Petro Kilekwa (also Chilekwa, late 1860s/early 1870s – 1967) was an African man who, after having been enslaved, became a teacher and later an Anglican priest. His autobiography, published in 1937, was titled Slave Boy to Priest: The Autobiography of Padre Petro Kilekwa.

== Biography ==
Kilekwa was born in Zambia, in a Bissa village, in the Mbisa tribe near Lake Bangweulu. He was born "Chilekwa"; Ki-, he says in his autobiography, "is a Swahili prefix". He was enslaved in the 1870s as a boy in what he called "the Maviti wars" (the term may point to "any brigand rather than to a specific ethnic group"). His mother was unable to pay his ransom — eight yards of calico cloth—and he was taken to the coast, headed for the Persian Gulf. However, the ship of his enslavers was stopped by the Royal Navy; HMS Osprey took them to Muscat. The group spent a month or so there, but then Kilekwa and another boy, Mambwala volunteered to serve on the Osprey and become seamen. They did odd jobs while the Osprey, looking for slave dhows, sailed throughout the Gulf and up the Euphrates to Basra (in present-day Iraq). One day, while most of the sailors were on shore in Bushehr, Persia, slavers tried to kidnap them but were prevented. They traveled as far as India and went sightseeing in Bombay. When the Osprey was to return to England, the two were transferred to HMS Bacchante; they were in Bombay again for the Golden Jubilee of Queen Victoria in 1887.

Kilekwa then went to Zanzibar, where the Universities' Mission to Central Africa took care of him. He was baptized and trained as a teacher. He married a woman, Beatrice Muyororo, with a similar background: she had also been enslaved and then set free by the British Navy, and like Kilekwa, she converted to Christianity and became a teacher. They taught together near Lake Malawi, where Kilekwa became a deacon and six years later a priest. He was ordained at the end of June 1917 with three others: Leonard Kangati, Lawrence Cisui, and Gilbert Mpalila.

By 1949, he was retired, living in Kiungani (in the Pwani Region of Tanzania) on "a small holding leased to him by the Government". He died in 1967, in his mid-nineties.
