= José Héctor Vázquez =

Spanish military officer

- Born: José Héctor Vázquez; 2 July 1903; Seville
- Died: 11 June 1977 (aged 73); Madrid
- Military career
- Allegiance: Nationalist Spain
- Branch: Spanish Army
- Service years: 1919–1973
- Rank: Lieutenant general
- Commands: Canary Islands
- Conflicts: Rif War; Spanish Civil War; Ifni War
- Awards: Military Medal
- Other work: Governor-General of Spanish Sahara (1958)

José Héctor Vázquez (Seville, 2 July 1903 – Madrid, 11 June 1977) was a Spanish military officer and colonial administrator, governor-general of Spanish Sahara.

== Biography ==
In 1919 he entered the Academia de Caballería de Valladolid, and in 1922 he was assigned as an ensign to the Hunters Regiment "Alfonso XIII". In 1923 he was promoted to lieutenant and took part in the Rif War, assigned to the Hunters Regiment "Alcántara" Nº 14 in Melilla; the unit was rebuilt after the Disaster of Annual. From there he joined the Mehal·la Khalifiana and in 1925 distinguished himself in the occupation of Morro Viejo, for which he was awarded the Military Medal. Promoted to captain, he was appointed riding teacher and in 1927 assigned to Seville.

He was part of the Spanish Olympic equestrian team. The Spanish coup of July 1936 surprised him in Berlin, as he was going to take part in the 1936 Summer Olympics. He returned to Spain and joined the Nationalist faction in the Spanish Civil War, placing himself under the command of Francisco García-Escámez in Pamplona. At the end of the Civil War he was promoted to lieutenant colonel and appointed professor at the Escuela de Estado Mayor. In 1949 he was promoted to colonel and in 1953 to brigadier general, when he was entrusted with the command of the Mixed Cavalry Brigade of Morocco.

In 1958, recently promoted to major general, he was assigned to the Ifni War, where he was appointed Governor-General of Spanish Sahara. In this capacity he was responsible for the agreement with the French general Gabriel Bourgund that allowed the expulsion of the rebels from the Moroccan Army of Liberation.

In January 1962 he was promoted to lieutenant general and appointed Captain General of the Canary Islands, a position he held until July 1969. In 1973 he moved to the reserve. He died in Madrid in 1977.

== Bibliography ==
- Canales Torres, Carlos; del Rey Vicente, Miguel (2010). Breve Historia de la guerra de Ifni-Sahara (in Spanish). Ediciones Nowtilus S.L. p. 288. ISBN 978-8497639729.
