= Mariano Gómez-Zamalloa y Quirce =

Spanish military officer

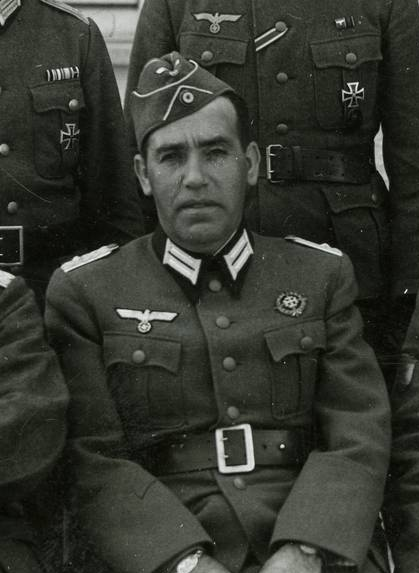
- Gómez-Zamalloa as an officer of the Blue Division, 1941–43
- Born: Mariano Gómez-Zamalloa y Quirce; 26 March 1897; A Coruña, Spain
- Died: 4 September 1973 (aged 76); Madrid, Spain
- Military career
- Allegiance: Kingdom of Spain (1909–1931); Spanish Republic (1931–1936); Nationalist Spain (1936–1941, 1942–1950); Nazi Germany (1941–1942)
- Branch: Spanish Army; German Army (Wehrmacht)
- Service years: 1909–41, 1942–68 (Spain); 1941–42 (Germany)
- Rank: General
- Units: Regulares; Blue Division
- Commands: Armoured Division No. 1 "Brunete"
- Conflicts: Rif War; Spanish Civil War; World War II; Ifni War
- Awards: Military Medal; Laureate Cross of Saint Ferdinand; Iron Cross 2nd Class; Grand Cross of the Royal and Military Order of Saint Hermenegild; Grand Cross of the Order of Cisneros; Grand Cross of the Imperial Order of the Yoke and Arrows
- Other work: Governor-General of Spanish West Africa (1957–1958)

Mariano Gómez-Zamalloa y Quirce (26 March 1897 – 4 September 1973) was a Spanish military officer and colonial administrator.

== Biography ==
Born into a military family, he entered the Toledo Infantry Academy in 1909. He received the rank of lieutenant in 1925 and participated in the Rif War as an officer in the Group "Ceuta" Nº 3 of the Regulares. At the time of the Spanish coup of July 1936, he held the rank of captain of the same regiment of the Regulares in Ceuta. He joined the Nationalist faction in the Spanish Civil War and at the head of a unit of the Regulares crossed the Strait of Gibraltar aboard the destroyer Churruca, disembarking in Cádiz and securing control of the city. Promoted to commander, he moved to Jerez de la Frontera, where he headed several columns composed of right-wingers and landowners with whom he participated in various military operations in the provinces of Cádiz and Seville, capturing Arcos de la Frontera and Olvera. Later his unit also participated in the advance towards Madrid, crossing Extremadura and the Tagus River valley. During the heavy fighting with the Spanish Republican Army for control of the capital, he fought in the Casa de Campo, Carabanchel, Ciempozuelos and the Battle of Jarama. In this battle he distinguished himself by his heroic action in the defense of Pingarrón; Gómez-Zamalloa was seriously wounded by enemy fire, with 19 war wounds and was mutilated in 87% of his body. For his conduct at Jarama, he was decorated with the Military Medal and with the Laureate Cross of Saint Ferdinand in 1940; he achieved the rank of lieutenant colonel the same year. From July 1941 he fought on the Eastern Front of World War II, in the ranks of the Blue Division (Spanish: División Azul, German: Blaue Division), or the 250th Infantry Division of the German Wehrmacht; he was assigned to the Pimentel Regiment. In 1942 he was awarded the Iron Cross 2nd Class. In May of the same year he was repatriated to Spain. (Note: Gómez-Zamalloa became the sub-commander of one of the regiments that made up the Blue Division.) On his return he was promoted to colonel and commanded the infantry battalion of the Ministry of the Army, the 1st Infantry Regiment of Madrid and the Guardia de Franco.

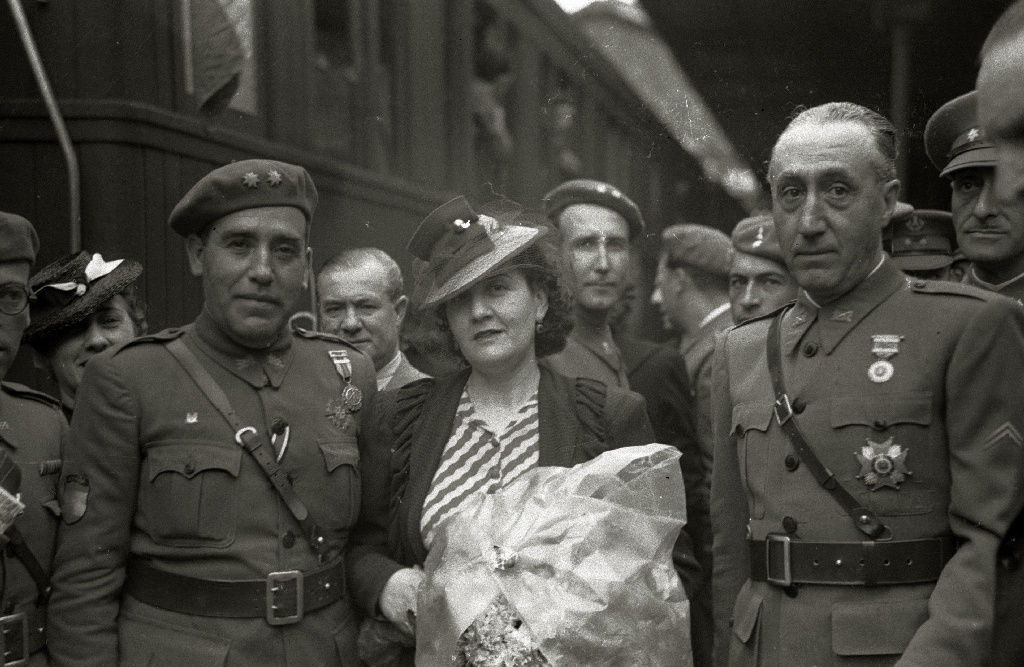
Gómez-Zamalloa (left) on his return from the Eastern Front, San Sebastián railway station (1942).

On 10 December 1955 he received the Grand Cross of the Royal and Military Order of Saint Hermenegild, and on 12 May 1956 he was appointed Military Governor of Gran Canaria. In June 1957 he was appointed Governor-General of the Province of Spanish West Africa, and after a reorganization he was Governor of the Province of Ifni. During his tenure the Ifni War broke out, and he managed to contain the offensive of the Moroccan Army of Liberation against the Spanish garrisons in Spanish Sahara and in Ifni, for which he was decorated with the Grand Cross of the Order of Cisneros on 1 October 1958. He was promoted to major general on 8 February 1959. He was appointed head of the Armoured Division No. 1 "Brunete" on 2 June 1959. In 1965 he received the Grand Cross of the Imperial Order of the Yoke and Arrows in 1965, and moved to the reserve in 1968. He died on 4 September 1973 from hepatic encephalopathy complicated by his war wounds.

== Bibliography ==
- Barriuso, Jaime; Sagarra, Pablo (2015). Soldado en cuatro guerras (in Spanish). Clásicos Galland. ISBN 9788416200115.
