= Federico Gómez =

Federico Gómez may refer to:

- Federico Gómez de Salazar, Spanish military officer
- Federico Agustín Gómez, Argentine tennis player
- Federico Gómez (pianist), Argentine pianist
- Fred Gómez Carrasco, American drug baron of Mexican descent
