= List of colonial governors of Spanish Sahara =

Governor of Spanish Sahara
- Gobernador del Sahara Español
- Coat of arms of Spanish Sahara

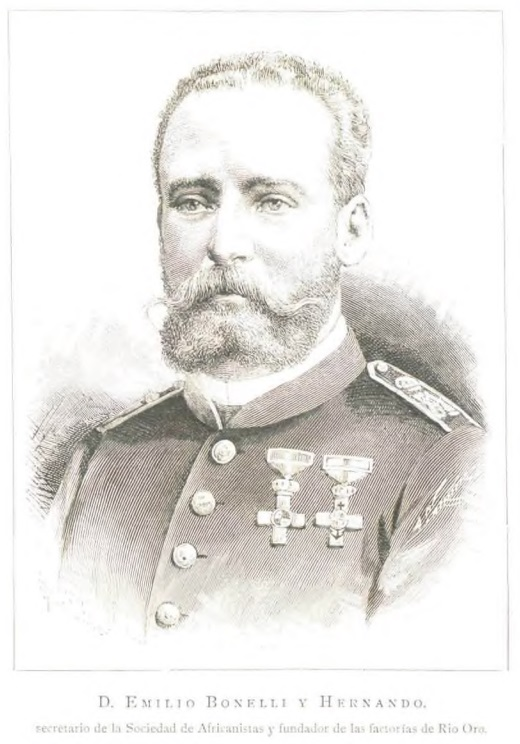
- Longest serving Emilio Bonelli; 3 November 1884 – bf. 1902
- Reports to: Head of State of Spain
- Seat: Villa Cisneros (1884–1940); El Aaiún (1940–1976)
- Formation: 3 November 1884; 142 years ago
- First holder: Emilio Bonelli
- Final holder: Federico Gómez de Salazar y Nieto
- Abolished: 6 February 1976; 50 years ago

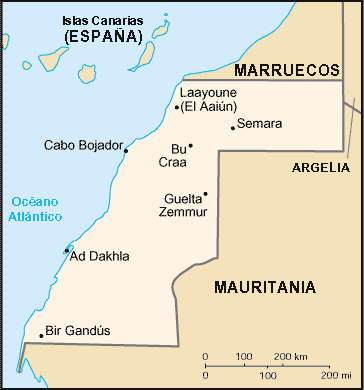
Map of Spanish Sahara.

The colonial governors of Spanish Sahara were the colonial administrators responsible for the territory of Spanish Sahara, an area equivalent to modern-day Western Sahara. The list covers the period from November 1884 to February 1976, when Spain announced it had transferred sovereignty to Morocco and terminated its administration of the territory.

== List ==
(Dates in italics indicate de facto continuation of office)

Tenure	Portrait	Incumbent	Notes
Spanish suzerainty
3 November 1884 to 10 July 1885		Emilio Bonelli, Commandant	
Royal Commissioner on the West Coast of Africa
10 July 1885 to 6 April 1887		Emilio Bonelli, Royal Commissioner	Arrived in Río de Oro on 26 August 1885
Political and Military Subgovernors of Río de Oro (subordinated to the captains-general of the Canary Islands)
6 April 1887 to bf. 1902		Emilio Bonelli, Subgovernor	
1902 to 1 December 1903		Ángel Villalobos, Subgovernor	
1 December 1903 to 1913		Francisco Bens, Subgovernor	Arrived in Río de Oro on 17 January 1904
Delegates of the High Commissioner in the Southern Zone of the Spanish protectorate in Morocco (subordinated to Spanish high commissioners in Morocco)
1913 to 7 November 1925		Francisco Bens, Delegate	Occupied Cape Juby (1916) and La Güera on Cabo Blanco (1920); founded the city of Villa Bens
7 November 1925 to 19 June 1932		Guillermo de la Peña Cusi, Delegate	
19 June 1932 to 30 August 1933		Eduardo Cañizares Navarro, Delegate	
30 August 1933 to 1 July 1934		José González Deleito, Delegate	
1 July 1934 to 29 August 1934		Benigno Martínez Portillo, Delegate	
Government delegates in the Sahara (subordinated to Spanish high commissioners in Morocco)
29 August 1934 to 4 May 1936		Benigno Martínez Portillo, Government Delegate	
4 May 1936 to 7 August 1936		Carlos Pedemonte Sabín, Government Delegate	Spanish coup of July 1936; start of the Spanish Civil War
7 August 1936 to 12 March 1937		Rafael Gallego Sainz, Government Delegate	
12 March 1937 to 17 May 1940		Antonio de Oro Pulido, Government Delegate	Founded the city of El Aaiún in 1938
Politico-Military Governor of Ifni and the Sahara and Delegate of the High Commissioner in the Southern Zone of the Spanish protectorate in Morocco (subordinated to Spanish high commissioners in Morocco)
17 May 1940 to 24 July 1946		José Bermejo López, Governor	
Governors of the Government of Spanish West Africa
24 July 1946 to 17 August 1949		José Bermejo López, Governor	
17 August 1949 to 29 March 1952		Francisco Rosaleny Burguet, Governor	
29 March 1952 to 26 February 1954		Venancio Tutor Gil, Governor	
26 February 1954 to 23 May 1957		Ramón Pardo de Santayana y Suárez, Governor	Apostolic Prefecture of Spanish Sahara and Ifni established on 5 July 1954, with Félix Erviti Barcelona OMI as the first apostolic prefect
23 May 1957 to 10 January 1958		Mariano Gómez-Zamalloa y Quirce, Governor	Served at the start of the Ifni War
Governors-general of Spanish Sahara
10 January 1958 to 22 July 1958		José Héctor Vázquez, Governor-General	Served at the end of the Ifni War
27 July 1958 to 6 October 1961		Mariano Alonso Alonso, Governor-General	
13 October 1961 to 21 February 1964		Pedro Latorre Alcubierre, Governor-General	
6 March 1964 to 5 November 1965		Joaquín Agulla y Jiménez-Coronado, Governor-General	
5 November 1965 to 26 November 1965		Adolfo Artalejo Campos, Governor-General	
5 December 1965 to 2 February 1967		Ángel Enríquez Larrondo, Governor-General	
18 February 1967 to 4 March 1971		José María Pérez de Lema y Tejero, Governor-General	Served at the time of the Zemla Intifada
4 March 1971 to 6 June 1974		Fernando de Santiago y Díaz de Mendívil, Governor-General	
6 June 1974 to 6 February 1976		Federico Gómez de Salazar y Nieto, Governor-General	Served at the time of the Green March
14 February 1976	Spain announces it has transferred sovereignty to Morocco		
26 February 1976	Spain terminates its administration		
27 February 1976	Sahrawi Arab Democratic Republic proclaimed by the Polisario Front		
14 April 1976	Spanish Sahara is partitioned and annexed by Morocco (claiming Southern Provinces) and Mauritania (claiming Tiris al-Gharbiyya)		
11 August 1979	Mauritanian part of the territory annexed by Morocco		

== See also ==
- International Court of Justice Advisory opinion on Western Sahara
- History of Western Sahara
- Moroccan Army of Liberation
- Spanish protectorate in Morocco
  - List of Spanish high commissioners in Morocco

== Bibliography ==
- Algueró Cuervo, José Ignacio (2006). El Sahara y España: claves de una descolonización pendiente (in Spanish). Idea. 84-96640-31-0.
- Diego Aguirre, José Ramón (1988). Historia del Sahara español (in Spanish). BPR Publishers.
