= List of colonial governors of Ifni =

This is a list of colonial heads of Ifni (1958–1969), a Spanish territory and later province on the Atlantic coast of Morocco. It was located across the Atlantic from the Canary Islands, and south of Agadir.

== Government delegate of Ifni ==
(Dates in italics indicate de facto continuation of office)

- 6 April 1934 – 1934: Osvaldo Fernando Capaz Montes (as commander) (b. 1874 – d. 1936)
- 6 September 1934 – 10 May 1935: Rodríguez de la Herranza
- 10 May 1935 – 15 August 1936: Juanjo Montero Cabañas
- 15 August 1936 – 15 October 1937: Rafael Molero Pimentel
- 16 October 1937 – March 1952: Juan Fernández Aceytuno y Montero
- March 1952 – 11 August 1957: José Martín Álvarez-Chas de Berbén (b. 1918 – d. 1957)
- 11 August 1957 – Aug 1957: José María Troncoso Palleiro
- August 1957 – March 1958: Francisco Mena Díaz (b. 1913 – d. 2007)

== Governor-general of Ifni ==
- 12 January 1958 – 12 February 1959: Mariano Gómez-Zamalloa y Quirce (b. 1897 – d. 1973)
- 12 February 1959 – 15 November 1961: Pedro Latorre Alcubierre (b. 1900 – d. 1995)
- 15 November 1961 – 3 May 1963: Joaquín Agulla y Jiménez-Coronado (b. 1902 – d. 1971)
- 3 May 1963 – 5 November 1965: Adolfo Artalejo Campos (b. 1905 – d. 1965)
- 11 November 1965 – 30 April 1967: Marino Trovo Larrasquito (d. 1967)
- 9 May 1967 – 25 June 1969: José Miguel Vega Rodríguez (b. 1913 – d. 1992)

== See also ==
- Ifni
- Ifni War
- Spanish protectorate in Morocco
- Spanish West Africa
