= Eduardo Cañizares Navarro =

Spanish military officer and politician (1899–1980)

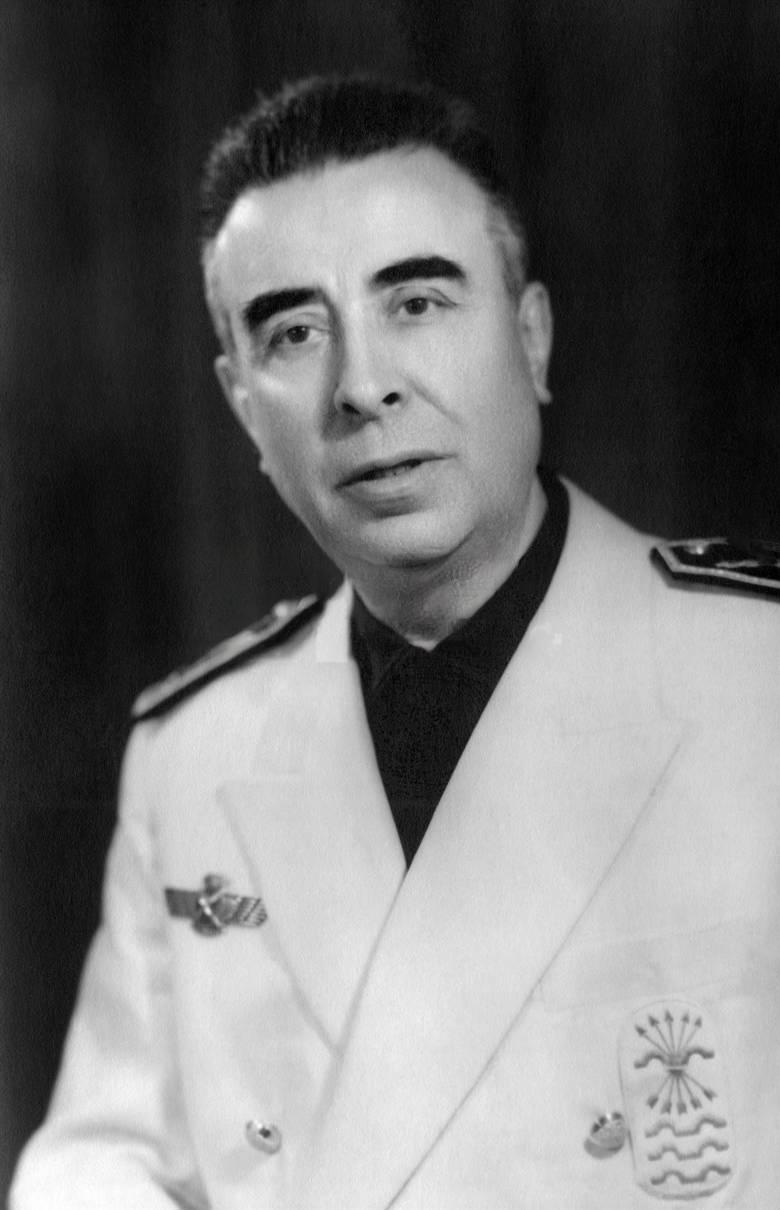
- Cañizares as civil governor of Soria, c. 1960

Civil Governor of Granada
- In office 28 February 1963 – 16 April 1966

Civil Governor of Soria
- In office 4 March 1960 – 28 February 1963

Subgovernor of Spanish Sahara
- In office 19 June 1932 – 30 August 1933
- Preceded by: Guillermo de la Peña Cusi
- Succeeded by: José González Deleito

Personal details
- Born: 21 April 1899 Spain
- Died: 5 December 1980 (aged 81) Madrid, Spain
- Party: FET y de las JONS
- Occupation: Military officer, politician

Eduardo Cañizares Navarro (21 April 1899 – 5 December 1980) a Spanish military officer and politician. He took part in the Spanish Civil War, during which he served as military governor of Badajoz and commanded several units. He subsequently served as civil governor of several provinces of Spain.

== Biography ==
A career military officer, he belonged to the infantry branch. On 19 June 1932, while holding the rank of infantry Major in the Aviation Service, he was appointed subgovernor of Spanish Sahara. He would hold the position between 1932 and 1933.

After the outbreak of the Civil War, he joined the Nationalist faction. He was eventually appointed military governor of Badajoz, assuming command of the Infantry Regiment "Castilla" No. 3 based in the city. After the departure of Colonel Juan Yagüe, Cañizares assumed responsibility for the Francoist Repression in Badajoz. In his position as governor, he managed to enjoy a great deal of autonomy from the Francoist authorities in Seville. A personal friend of Gonzalo Queipo de Llano, he would eventually break with him due to the great autonomy he enjoyed in his personal fiefdom of Badajoz.

During the conflict, he ended up joining the Falange. In April 1937 he was appointed commander of the "Badajoz" Division, later renamed the 21st Division. He would eventually reach the rank of colonel. In the summer of 1938 his unit suffered a severe defeat during the fighting at the Mérida Stock Exchange, with Cañizares being dismissed and prosecuted.

In 1948, he was appointed Head of the Esparto Service.

During the Francoist regime, he served as civil governor in Soria (1960–1963) and Granada (1963–1966).

He died in Madrid on 5 December 1980.

== Bibliography ==
- Diego Aguirre, José Ramón (1988). Historia del Sahara español (in Spanish). BPR Publishers.
- Engel, Carlos (2000). Historia de las divisiones del ejército nacional (in Spanish). Almena Ediciones.
- Martínez Bande, José Manuel (1981). La batalla de Pozoblanco y el cierre de la bolsa de Mérida (in Spanish). Madrid: Editorial San Martín.
- Moreno Gómez, Francisco (1985). La Guerra civil en Córdoba (1936–1939) (in Spanish). Córdoba: Alpuerto.
- Morillas, Javier (1988). Sáhara occidental, desarrollo y subdesarrollo (in Spanish). Prensa y Ediciones Iberoamericanas.
- Preston, Paul (2013) [2011]. El Holocausto Español. Odio y Exterminio en la Guerra Civil y después (in Spanish). Barcelona: Debolsillo.
- Ponce Alberca, Julio (2008). Guerra, Franquismo y Transición. Los gobernadores civiles en Andalucía (1936–1979) (in Spanish). Centro de Estudios Andaluces. ISBN 978-84-691-6712-0.
- Thomas, Hugh (1976). Historia de la Guerra Civil Española (in Spanish). Barcelona: Círculo de Lectores. ISBN 84-226-0874-X.
