= José Bermejo López =

Spanish military officer

- Born: José Bermejo López; 1894; Cartagena, Murcia
- Died: 1971 (aged 76–77)
- Military career
- Allegiance: Nationalist Spain
- Branch: Spanish Army
- Rank: Colonel
- Conflicts: Rif War; Spanish Civil War
- Other work: Governor of Spanish Sahara (1940–1949)

José Bermejo López (1894 in Cartagena, Murcia – 1971) was a Spanish military officer and colonial administrator.

== Biography ==
Bermejo entered the Spanish Army at an early age, where he made his professional career. At the time of the Spanish coup of July 1936 he was posted in Temsamane commune, in the Spanish protectorate in Morocco. After the outbreak of the military uprising, Bermejo joined the Nationalist faction and subsequently participated in the Spanish Civil War.

In May 1940, with the rank of colonel, Bermejo was appointed Politico-Military Governor of Ifni and the Sahara. During the time he held the position, he did an important work in Spanish Sahara, establishing the administrative capital in Sidi Ifni and dividing the territory into three districts. In 1945, he also created the weekly A. O. E. (acronym for África Occidental Española or "Spanish West Africa"), that would soon become the main periodical of the territory. In 1946 the Francoist regime made an administrative reform of the African territories, which became Spanish West Africa. Bermejo continued in his post (now as Governor of the Spanish West Africa), remaining there until August 1949.

He was subsequently assigned to the High Commission of Spain in Morocco, where he held various positions such as sub-delegate of Indigenous Affairs and delegate of Education and Culture. In 1958 he was appointed information advisor at the Spanish embassy in Tunisia, a position he held until 1965.

== Bibliography ==
- Diego Aguirre, José Ramón (1988). Historia del Sahara español (in Spanish). BPR Publishers.
- Moga Romero, Vicente (2004). Las heridas de la historia. Testimonios de la guerra civil española en Melilla (in Spanish). Bellaterra.
- Morillas, Javier (1988). Sahara occidental, desarrollo y subdesarrollo (in Spanish). Prensa y Ediciones Iberoamericanas.
- Pérez García, Guadalupe (2006). A.O.E. Semanario Gráfico de África Occidental Española. Historia y Comunicación Social (in Spanish). Vol. 11. Madrid: UCM. pp. 83–97. ISSN 1137-0734.
- Segura Valero, Gastón (2006). Ifni. La Guerra que silenció Franco (in Spanish). Martínez Roca.
