= Emilio Bonelli =

Spanish military officer

Don Emilio Bonelli y Hernando
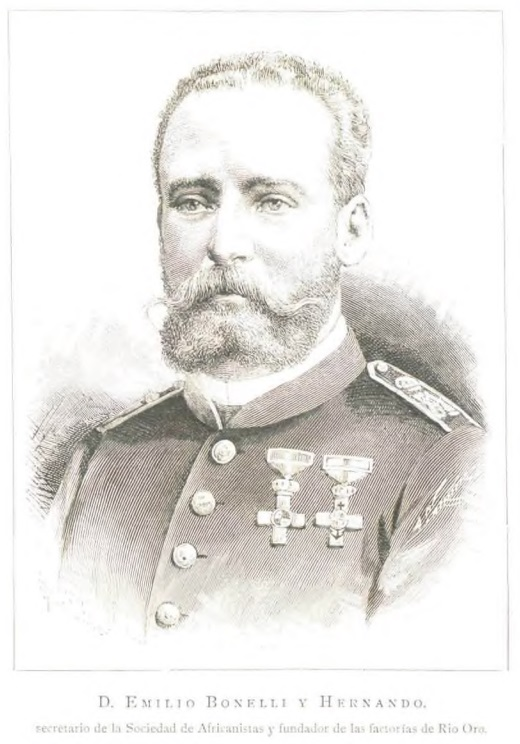
- Bonelli depicted in La Ilustración Española y Americana, 8 April 1885.
- Born: November 7, 1854; Zaragoza, Kingdom of Spain
- Died: November 28, 1926 (aged 72); Madrid, Kingdom of Spain
- Military career
- Branch: Spanish Army
- Service years: 1875–1882

Don Emilio Bonelli y Hernando (7 November 1854 in Zaragoza, Aragon – 28 November 1926 in Madrid) was a Spanish military officer, author, explorer, colonial administrator and Africanist.

== Biography ==
Bonelli entered the Spanish Army in 1875 and attended the Toledo Infantry Academy, achieving the rank of ensign in 1878. He left the Army in 1882, and undertook an expedition through the interior of Morocco, crossing the territory between Fez, Meknes and Tangier.

In 1884 Bonelli commanded an expedition to take the territory of Río de Oro (Oued Edhahab), occupying the Atlantic coast between Cape Bojador (Ras Bujadur) and Cape Blanco (Ras Nouadhibou) and founding Villa Cisneros (Dakhla). On 26 December 1884, the Kingdom of Spain declared 'a protectorate of the African coast', and on 14 January 1885 officially informed the other great powers in writing, thereby establishing Spanish Sahara. In July 1885, Bonelli was appointed by King Alfonso XII to the newly created position of Royal Commissioner on the West Coast of Africa (which would later be renamed as Political and Military Subgovernor of Río de Oro), managing to establish peace with tribes in the area.

In 1913 Bonelli was a founding member of the Liga Africanista Española, of which he was vice president.

== Works ==
Bonelli was the author of:

- El imperio de Marruecos y su constitución (1882)
- El Sahara (1887)
- Nuevos territorios españoles en África (1887)
- El problema de Marruecos (1910)

== Bibliography ==
- Blanco Vázquez, Luis (2012). Vestigios del pasado colonial español en Río de Oro (Sáhara Occidental). La línea de Fortines de Villa Cisneros (PDF). Hispania Nova: Revista de historia contemporánea (in Spanish). Getafe: Charles III University of Madrid. ISSN 1138-7319.
- Fernández Rodríguez, Manuel (1985). España y Marruecos en los primeros años de la Restauración (1875–1894) (in Spanish). Madrid: CSIC; Centro de Estudios Históricos. ISBN 84-00-06113-6.
- Ramírez Verdún, Pedro (2005). Emilio Bonelli Hernando. Teniente Coronel de Infantería. Ejército: de tierra español (in Spanish). p. 109. ISSN 1696-7178.
- Salom, Julio (2003). Los orígenes coloniales del Sahara occidental en el marco de la política española. Cuadernos de historia contemporánea (in Spanish). Madrid: Servicio de Publicaciones (Universidad Complutense de Madrid). pp. 247–272. ISSN 0214-400X.
