= Francisco Bens =

Spanish military officer (1867–1949)

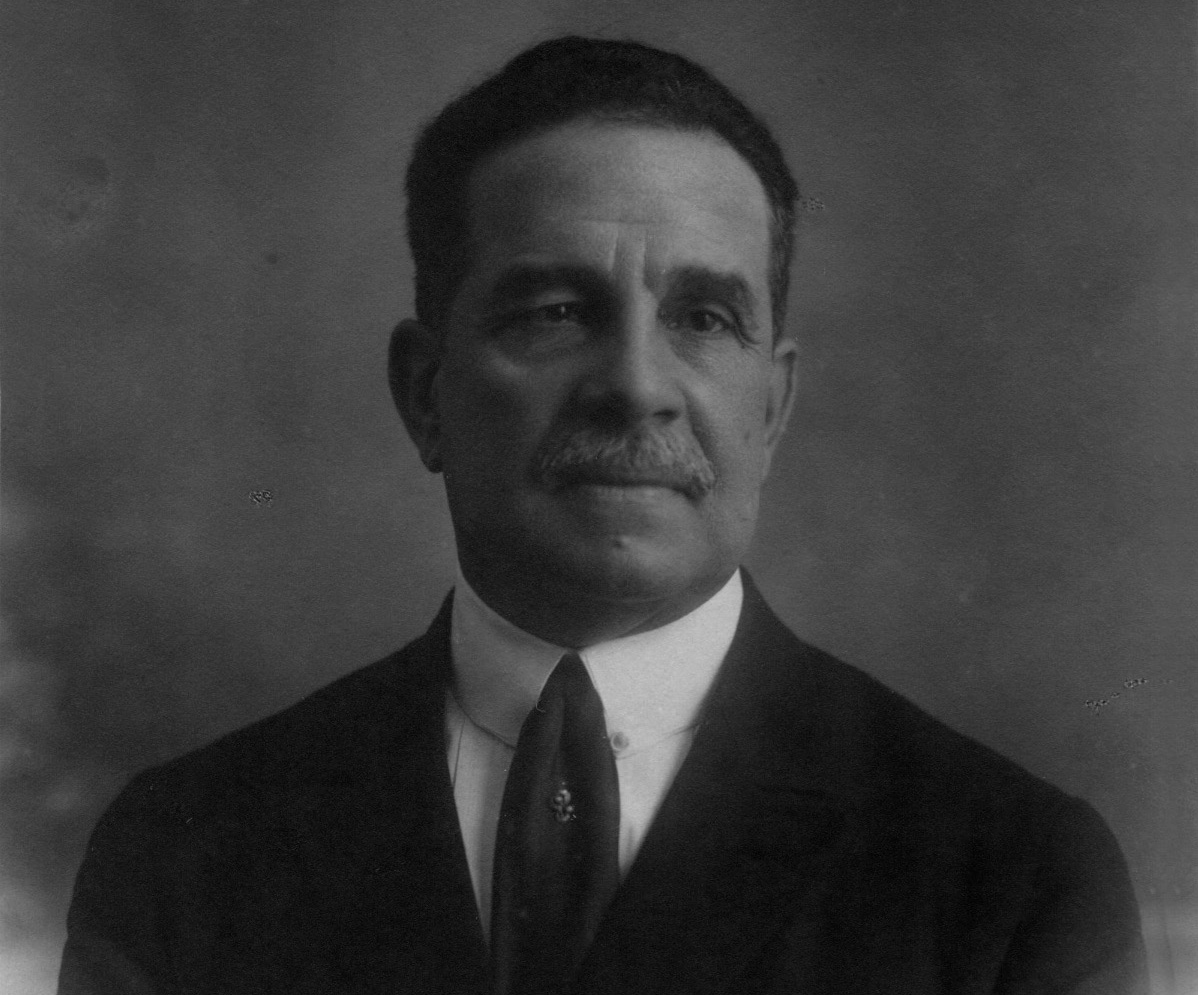
- Bens on 6 July 1922
- Born: Francisco Bens Argandoña; 28 June 1867; Havana, Cuba, Kingdom of Spain
- Died: 5 April 1949 (aged 81); Madrid, Spain
- Military career
- Allegiance: Kingdom of Spain
- Branch: Spanish Army
- Rank: General
- Conflicts: First Melillan campaign Cuban War of Independence
- Other work: Political-military governor in Spanish Sahara (1903–1925)

Francisco Bens Argandoña (28 June 1867 – 5 April 1949) was a Spanish military officer and colonial administrator. He served as one of the first governors of Spanish Sahara, and his work was instrumental in establishing Spanish control over the territory.

== Biography ==
At the age of fifteen, he entered the Military Academy in Havana, Cuba, graduating as a second lieutenant at eighteen. Transferred to the Spanish mainland, he took part in suppressing the republican uprising led by Brigadier Manuel Villacampa del Castillo in Madrid on 19 September 1886. In 1893, during the first Melillan campaign, he joined the relief force sent to Melilla, where Spanish troops were under siege by the Riffian tribesmen at the Fort of Cabrerizas Altas (the governor of Melilla, General Juan García y Margallo, had been killed during the fighting). In February 1896, he was sent to Cuba, where he participated in the Cuban War of Independence. His brave and hard-working performance earned him the distinction of four Crosses of Military Merit with Red Decoration. At the end of the war, in which Cuba achieved independence, he returned to Spain with the rank of captain.

In December 1903, he was appointed political-military governor of the colony of Río de Oro, and on 17 January 1904 he landed in the bay of Villa Cisneros. Spanish rule was precarious and was limited to the area of Villa Cisneros. Bens tries to attract the natives, while undertaking expeditions into the interior, with the purpose of making the Spanish presence not only theoretical but effective. In 1907, Bens went to Aargub, on the other side of the bay, and in 1910 he made an expedition of four hundred kilometers to Atar in the Adrar region, already under French colonial rule.

On 29 June 1916, he occupied Cape Juby as a protectorate (the main city would be named Villa Bens in his honor), and on 30 November 1920 he occupied La Güera on Cabo Blanco, after negotiating with local tribal notables. In 1916, he was promoted to lieutenant colonel in recognition of his significant merits and notable service in Río de Oro (typically, such extraordinary promotions were granted for "merits in war"). In 1925, holding the rank of colonel, he was relieved of his command in the province of Sahara. His work in the Sahara would have great importance in the subsequent occupation of the Sahrawi interior territory and in the consolidation of Spanish colonial rule.

He was subsequently promoted to honorary general, and at the time of his death on 5 April 1949, he held numerous decorations.

== Works ==
- (in Spanish) Mis memorias. Veintidós años en el desierto. 1947.

== Bibliography ==
- Algueró Cuervo, José Ignacio (2006). El Sahara y España: claves de una descolonización pendiente (in Spanish). Idea. 84-96640-31-0.
- Diego Aguirre, José Ramón (1988). Historia del Sahara español (in Spanish). BPR Publishers.
- Hodges, Tony (1983). Western Sahara: the roots of a desert war. L. Hill.
