= El Hamouti Mohand Elkhadir =

Moroccan anti-colonial activist (1936–1964)

- ⴰⵃⴰⵎⵓⵟⵉ ⵎⵓⵃⴰⵏⴷ ⵏ ⵔⵅⴰⴹⴰⵔ
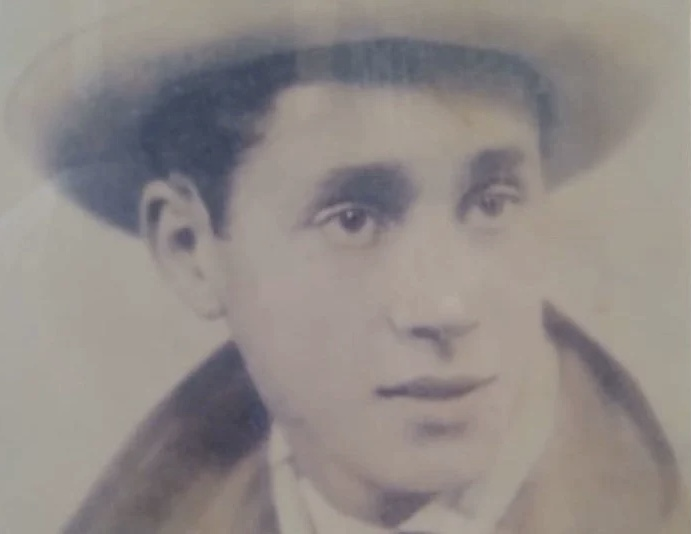
- El Hamouti, known as "The African Soldier"
- Born: February 1, 1936; Beni Ensar, Morocco
- Disappeared: 1964; Algeria
- Other name: The African Soldier
- Occupations: Businessman, freedom fighter, diplomat

El Hamouti Mohand Elkhadir (Berber languages: ⴰⵃⴰⵎⵓⵟⵉ ⵎⵓⵃⴰⵏⴷ ⵏ ⵔⵅⴰⴹⴰⵔ; born 1 February 1936 – disappeared in 1964), also known as "The African Soldier", was a Moroccan businessman, resistance fighter, and diplomat. He is known for his logistical, political, and military support for several national liberation movements across North Africa. He played a significant role as a coordinator of the Moroccan Army of Liberation in the Rif region and as a financier and supporter of the Algerian War of Independence.

== Early life and background ==
El Hamouti was born in Beni Ensar, in the Rif region of northern Morocco. He belonged to the Hamouti clan of the Mazzuja lineage, part of the larger Guelaya tribe. His father, Khader Muhand u Hamou, was a prominent trader who distributed goods from Melilla throughout the region.

From an early age, El Hamouti was involved in anti-colonial activities and embraced a strong Pan-Africanist and anti-imperialist ideology.

== Revolutionary activities ==
In the 1950s, El Hamouti combined his business ventures with revolutionary efforts. He joined the Moroccan Army of Liberation and organized armed and logistical operations against colonial authorities.

His residence in Beni Ensar served as a safe haven for FLN leaders such as Ahmed Ben Bella, Mohammed Boudiaf, Houari Boumédiène, and Abane Ramdane. He also used his fleet of ships—including the Victoria and Mirlo I & II—to smuggle arms from Melilla to Algeria.

In addition to his military role, he was involved in international diplomatic missions across Europe and the Middle East to garner support for North African liberation movements.

== Coordination in the Rif ==
El Hamouti became one of the key coordinators of the Army of Liberation in the Rif, handling arms logistics, communications between rebel fronts, and coordination with the Algerian resistance.

== Disappearance ==
After Algeria gained independence in 1962, he briefly returned to Morocco. During the outbreak of the Sand War in 1963 between Morocco and Algeria, he traveled back to Algeria on a mediation mission. He disappeared there in 1964 under unclear circumstances. Several sources suggest he may have been the victim of a political assassination.

== Legacy ==
El Hamouti is commemorated by historians and activists in the Rif, Morocco, and Algeria as a symbol of anti-colonial resistance and Maghrebi solidarity.

== See also ==
- Algerian War of Independence
- Sand War
- Rif
- Moroccan Army of Liberation
