= Spanish West Africa =

Spanish colony from 1946 to 1958

Spanish West Africa África Occidental Española (Spanish): غرب افريقيا الاسبانية (Arabic)
- 1946–1958
- Spanish Northwestern African possessions in 1912.
- Status: Federation of Spanish colonial possessions
- Capital: Sidi Ifni
- Common languages: Spanish; Arabic
- Religion: Roman Catholicism; Islam
- Head of State
  - 1946–1958: Francisco Franco
- Governor
  - 1946–1949 (first): José Bermejo López
  - 1957–1958 (last): Mariano Gómez-Zamalloa
- Historical era: Cold War
  - Established: 20 July 1946
  - Disestablished: 10 January 1958
- Currency: Spanish peseta
Preceded by
Spanish Morocco
Ifni
Saguia el-Hamra
Río de Oro
Succeeded by
Morocco
Ifni
Spanish Sahara

Spanish West Africa (Spanish: África Occidental Española, AOE) was a grouping of Spanish colonies along the Atlantic coast of northwest Africa. It was formed in 1946 by joining the southern zone (the Cape Juby Strip) of the Spanish protectorate in Morocco with the colonies of Ifni, Saguia el-Hamra and Río de Oro into a single administrative unit. Following the Ifni War (1957–58), Spain ceded the Cape Juby Strip to Morocco by the Treaty of Angra de Cintra, and created separate provinces for Ifni and the Sahara in 1958.

Spanish West Africa was formed by a decree of 20 July 1946. The new governor sat at Ifni. He was ex officio the delegate of the Spanish high commissioner in Morocco in the southern zone of the protectorate, to facilitate its government along the same lines as the other Spanish possessions on the coast. On 12 July 1947, Ifni and the Sahara were raised into distinct entities, but still under the authority of the governor in Ifni. On 10 and 14 January 1958, respectively, the Sahara and Ifni were raised into regular Spanish overseas provinces completely independent of one another.

== Governors ==
Overview of governors of Spanish West Africa
Tenure	Incumbent	Notes
24 July 1946 to 17 August 1949	José Bermejo López, Governor	
17 August 1949 to 29 March 1952	Francisco Rosaleny Burguet, Governor	
29 March 1952 to 26 February 1954	Venancio Tutor Gil, Governor	
26 February 1954 to 23 May 1957	Ramón Pardo de Santayana y Suárez, Governor	Apostolic Prefecture of Spanish Sahara and Ifni established on 5 July 1954, with Félix Erviti Barcelona OMI as the first apostolic prefect.
23 May 1957 to 10 January 1958	Mariano Gómez-Zamalloa y Quirce, Governor	Served at the start of the Ifni War.

=== Vice Governors ===
- 1947-1955: Rufino Pérez Barruecos
- 1956-1958: Manuel Mulero Clemente
