= Ifni =

Former Spanish colonial province in Morocco

Coordinates: 29°22′N 10°11′W

Territory of Ifni Territorio de Ifni (Spanish) إفني (Arabic) ⵉⴼⵏⵉ (Berber languages)
- 1860 (Note: The Sultanate of Morocco agreed to handle the place (of uncertain location) to Spain in the 1860 Treaty of Wad Ras. In the wake of the visit of a Spanish delegation to Fez in 1877, a joint Hispano-Moroccan committee was created in order to determine the location of Santa Cruz de la Mar Pequeña. This committee eventually misidentified Santa Cruz de la Mar Pequeña with Ifni, actually located about 480 kilometers north of the real fortress. The Moroccan Sultan Hassan I accepted the identification in 1883, even if the border delimitation did not take place at the time and the effective Spanish occupation did not take place until 1934.)–1969
- Coat of arms

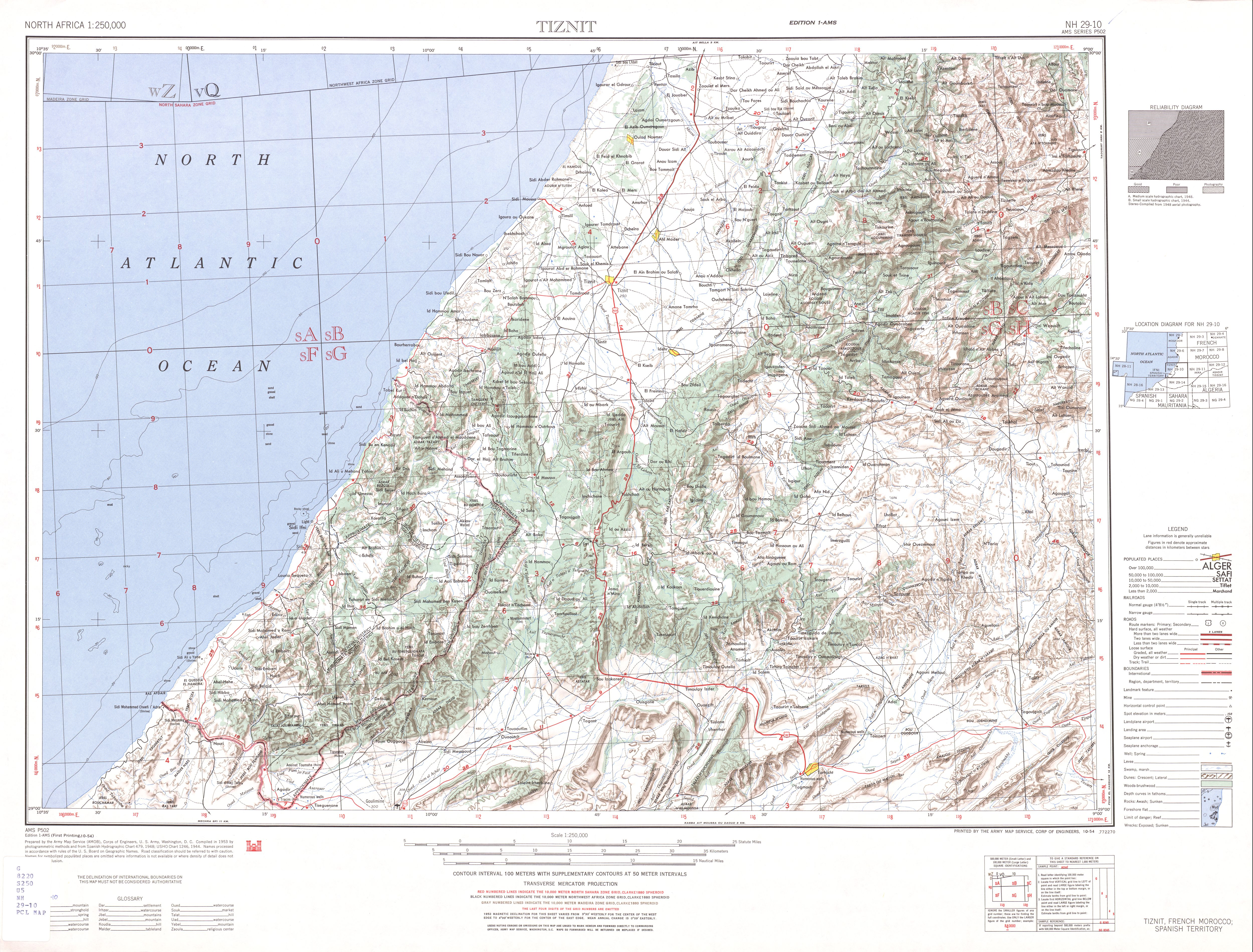
- Map showing the boundary of Ifni (Date on map: 1953)
- Status: Colony of Spain (1934–1946); Constituent of Spanish West Africa (1946–1958); Province of Spain (1958–1969)
- Capital: Sidi Ifni
- Common languages: Spanish; Moroccan Arabic
- Religion: Catholicism; Islam
- Head of State
  - 1934–1936: Niceto Alcalá-Zamora
  - 1936: Manuel Azaña
  - 1936–1969: Francisco Franco
- Government Delegate
  - 1934–1935 (first): Rodríguez de la Herranza
  - 1957–1958 (last): Francisco Mena Díaz
- Governor-General
  - 1958–1959 (first): Mariano Gómez-Zamalloa y Quirce
  - 1967–1969 (last): José Miguel Vega Rodríguez

Establishment
- Historical era: Interwar period, World War II, Cold War, Decolonisation of Africa
  - Treaty of Wad Ras: 26 April 1860
  - Established: 12 January 1934
  - Ifni War: 23 November 1957
  - Treaty of Angra de Cintra: 1 April 1958
  - Retroceded to Morocco: 30 June 1969
- Currency: Spanish peseta
Preceded by	Succeeded by
Sultanate of Morocco	Kingdom of Morocco

The Territory of Ifni (Spanish: Territorio de Ifni) was a Spanish province on the Atlantic coast of Morocco, south of Agadir and across from the Canary Islands. It had a total area of 1,502 km^{2} (580 sq mi), and a population of 51,517 in 1964. The main industry was fishing. The present-day Moroccan province in the same area is called Sidi Ifni, with its capital in the city of the same name, but encompassing a much larger territory.

== History ==
Spanish presence in the area can be traced to a settlement called Santa Cruz de la Mar Pequeña, founded in 1476. After attacks by the Berbers, the Spanish decided to focus on colonising other areas of North Africa and abandoned the region.

In the mid-19th century, when the European powers looked again to Africa for resources, Spain suddenly mooted an interest in its lost late medieval fortress in order to stake a claim to the southern part of Morocco. This served as a pretext for a short war with Morocco in 1859.

The territory and its main town of Sidi Ifni were ceded to Spain by the Sultanate of Morocco on 26 April 1860, but there was little interest in this colonial acquisition until 1934, when the Governor-General of Spanish Sahara took up residence. The airport had become a crucial stopover for flights between the mainland and the Canary Islands, and in 1938 a commercial route was established by airline Iberia linking Seville, Larache, Sidi Ifni, Cape Juby and Gando in the Canaries.

The origin of Ifni must be dated to 1934, after Colonel Osvaldo Capaz took possession of the area, on behalf of the Government of the Second Spanish Republic. At that time, there was only a small construction, an aduar called Amezdog, belonging to the El Mesti Kabyle of the Ait-Baamarani Berber tribe, and of which there are currently no remnants.

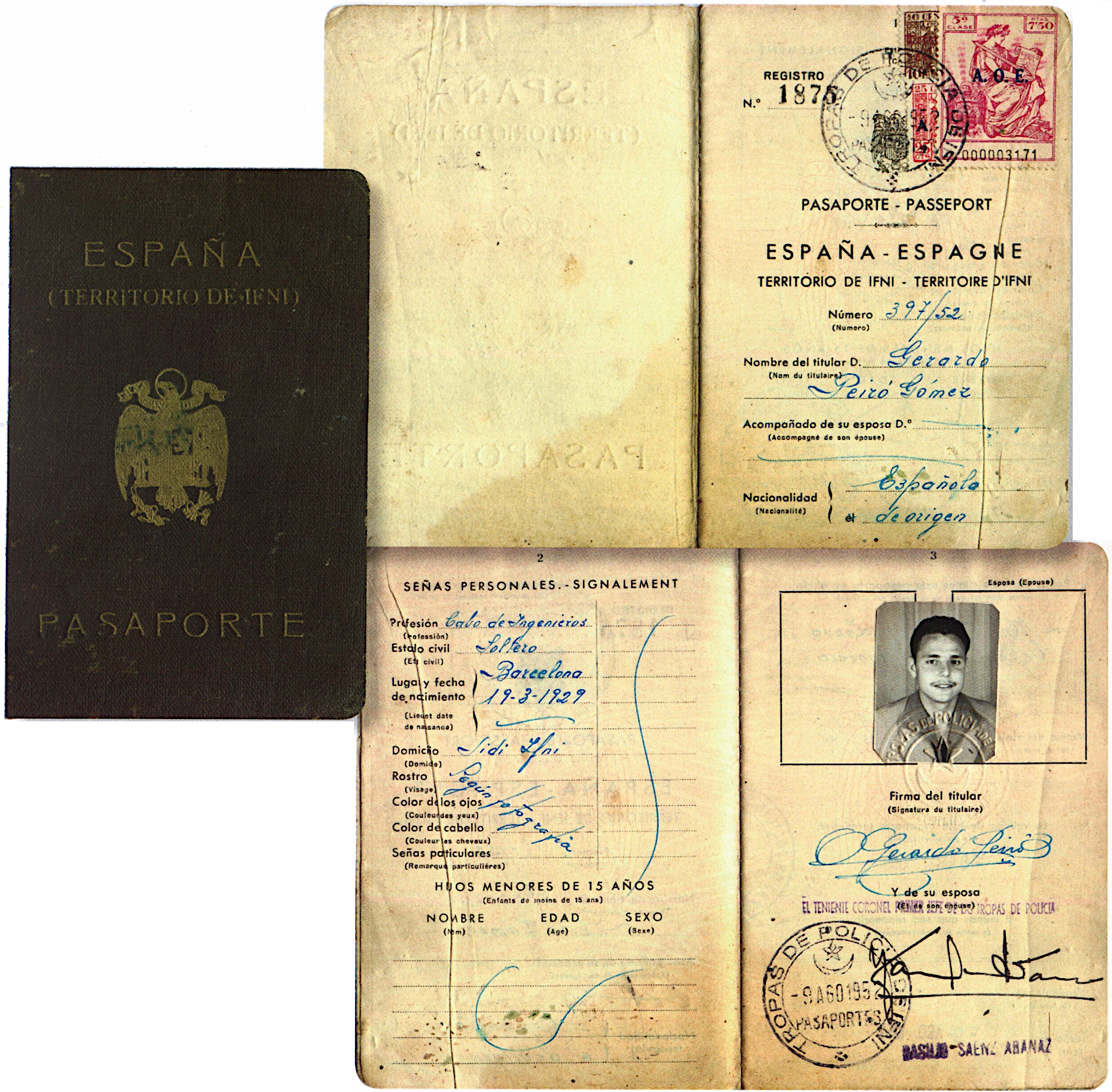
Passport issued in the Territory of Ifni, 1952.

Ifni's occupation took place after satisfactory contacts between Colonel Capaz and representatives of the population of the territory, with conversations carried out in Cape Juby on 27 March 1934. Then, on 4 April, after receiving authorization from the Spanish Government, said colonel embarked on the Canalejas gunboat towards Ifni. On that date, a three-engine unit dropped a letter from Capaz in the Arbaa de Mesti souk, announcing the agreements adopted and the next Spanish landing. The event was related thus by Francisco Hernández-Pacheco, who was part of the scientific expedition that traveled over the territory of Ifni shortly after:

Capaz landed on the beach of Sidi Ifni on April 6, accompanied only by Lieutenant Lorenzi and the signalman from Canalejas, Fernando Gómez Flórez. To meet the Spanish boat, a row-boat with local people left the beach, to which Capaz and his crew transferred, all of them landing safely on the beach. Capaz addressed a group of indigenous people who were waiting for him, from which some notable stood out, and who offered the Colonel a bowl of sour milk as a welcome sign. Later, on horseback, he ascended to the top of the coastal area and in the immediate hamlet of Amedog (sic) he ate. During the meal some groups of indigenous and notable people arrived, to whom Capaz explained simply and clearly the purposes and intentions of Spain. The locals left after the meal, convening to hold meetings to discuss the matter. The following morning they informed Colonel Capaz of Ifni's agreement to join Spain. Francisco Hernández-Pacheco, Physiographic and geological features of the Ifni territory.

Together with Amezdog, the Spanish presence was formalized in a ceremony attended by notable Baamaranis and Colonel Osvaldo Capaz.

In just three years it went from an occasional tent camp, and some barracks, to the construction of six hundred houses or buildings. Indeed, the population experienced spectacular growth in just a few years. By 1940 the urban structure was already well advanced in its streets, squares and main buildings. However, for some years communication with the metropolis was difficult. The city did not stop growing in all subsequent years. Even just three short years before the 1969 retrocession to Morocco, the most considerable urban expansion was concluded, on the other side of the Ifni river, in the neighborhood popularly known as "Barrio Agulla" or, more commonly, "Colominas" (name of the Spanish construction company of the neighborhood).

Borders of the Ifni territory before and after the war.

After Moroccan independence, the Moroccan Army of Liberation attacked the territory between November 1957 and July 1958. The attacks began on 23 November 1957, beginning the War of Ifni. However, the city was supplied by sea and air and protected by outposts. Initially, a good part of the military personnel were indigenous, especially those included in the Ifni Group of Shooters and in the Territorial Police. They were disarmed, demobilized, and promptly replaced. Except for a frustrated plan by the Moroccan irregular forces to eliminate the Spanish officers, the initial minor incidents and an attack, Sidi Ifni was not directly affected by the military events. These were developed in the interior of the territory. On the Spanish side, it was finally decided to establish a defensive perimeter that is denser and more difficult to infiltrate and, furthermore, easier to sustain and supply, near the city of Sidi Ifni (between 8 and 10 km from the city center, according to the zone) leaving most of arid territory that would have been much more costly to defend without appreciable advantage. Those defensive positions, quite numerous, and the dirt tracks that connect them, are still perfectly visible.

After the Ifni War, most of the territory became part of Morocco by the Treaty of Angra de Cintra. In 1958, the colony was declared a Spanish overseas province in order to forestall United Nations criticism of continued colonisation.

A fundamental aspect of Spanish political management in the area was the recognition and respect for the customs and traditions of the Baamarani population, as well as their religious beliefs. For example, Spain provided the means for the construction of mosques and for the Koranic education of Muslim schoolchildren. The prohibition of any kind of Christian religious proselytism was a perfectly known and respected principle.

On 30 June 1969, the Spanish government formally ceded what it kept from Ifni to Morocco, by virtue of the Retrocession Treaty signed in Fez on 4 January and ratified 22 April 1969, thus making the retrocession effective. After that, a difficult process of adaptation began, aggravated by an acute economic crisis and the imposition of the French-speaking administration.

== Postage stamps ==
Spain started issuing postage stamps to be used in Ifni in 1941, initially overprinting Spanish stamps with "TERRITORIO DE IFNI", then issuing new designs in 1943. Issues followed at the rate of about ten per year with the last on 23 November 1968. Ifni stamps are of particular interest for collectors, as there cannot be any new issues, and it is therefore possible to collect the complete series.

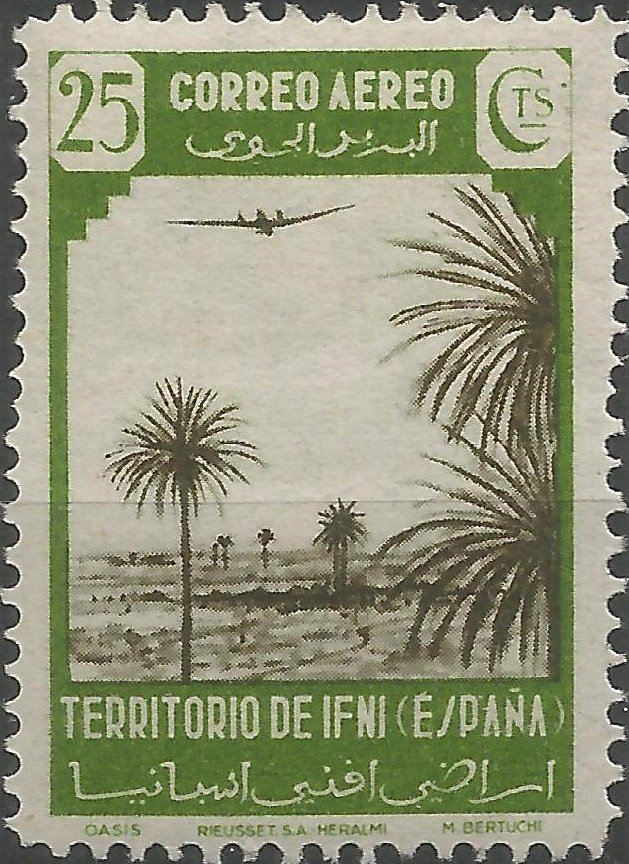
Stamp issued in 1943, shooting landscapes and aviation.

== See also ==
- List of colonial governors of Ifni
- Ifni War
- Spanish protectorate in Morocco
- Spanish West Africa
