= Supreme Council of Military Justice =

Former military justice body in Spain (1939–1987)

The Supreme Council of Military Justice (Spanish: Consejo Supremo de Justicia Militar, CSJM) was a body of military justice that existed in Spain. Created during the Francoist regime, it recovered the functions of other historical bodies. Currently its functions are exercised by the Fifth Chamber of the Supreme Court.

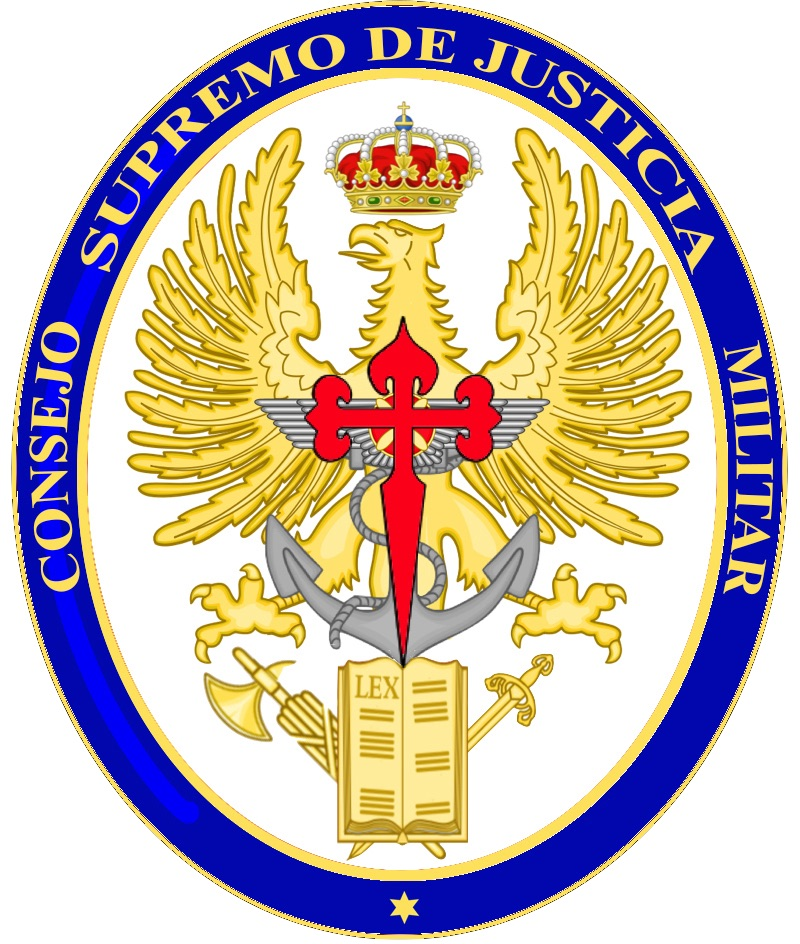
Emblem of the Supreme Council of Military Justice

== History ==
=== Background ===
Its origins date back to the time of the Hispanic Monarchy, when the Supreme Council of War was an advisory body that was closely connected to the Council of State. There is evidence of the existence of the Council of War since at least 1516. Over the following centuries it changed its name on numerous occasions, as did its powers over the Army and the Navy.

Between 1834 and 1869 it was called the "Supreme Court of War and Navy". During the following years its structure changed, and the Royal Decree of 13 February 1878 named it the Supreme Council of War and Navy. Its activity extended practically throughout the entire period of the Restoration. In 1931, after the proclamation of the Second Republic, it disappeared following the military reform of Manuel Azaña (Azaña Law), which transferred its functions and powers to the Sixth Chamber of the Supreme Court. This measure caused enormous unrest among the Armed Forces, who considered it an intrusion of civil power into the military sphere.

=== History of the body ===
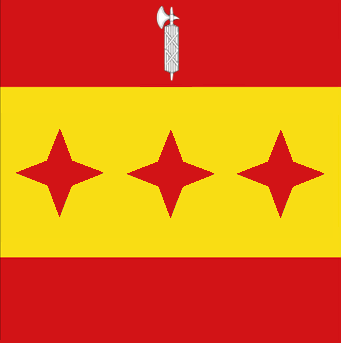
Insignia of the Lt. Gen. President of the Supreme Council of Military Justice (Note: As stipulated by the Royal Decree 1511/1977.)

Following the outbreak of the Civil War, a Military Court of Justice was organised within the Nationalist faction, which in 1939 (with the establishment of the Francoist regime) would lead to the creation of the Supreme Council of Military Justice (CSJM). This new body, which was part of the Army Ministry, recovered the powers of the former Supreme Council of War and Navy that had disappeared in 1931. It was chaired by Emilio Fernández Pérez. The formation of the entity meant a return of the powers of military justice to the strictly military sphere. It was based in the Palace of Fontalba, on La Castellana in Madrid, which is now occupied by the Attorney General's office.

On 3 June 1982, the CSJM, chaired by Federico Gómez de Salazar, issued a sentence against the military personnel who participated in the 1981 coup attempt (Case 2/81).

By Organic Law 4/1987, of 15 July 1987, the CSJM disappeared and its functions were assumed by the Fifth Chamber of the Supreme Court.

== See also ==
- Spanish Armed Forces during the period of Francoism
