= Federico Gómez de Salazar =

Spanish military officer

Federico Gómez de Salazar y Nieto
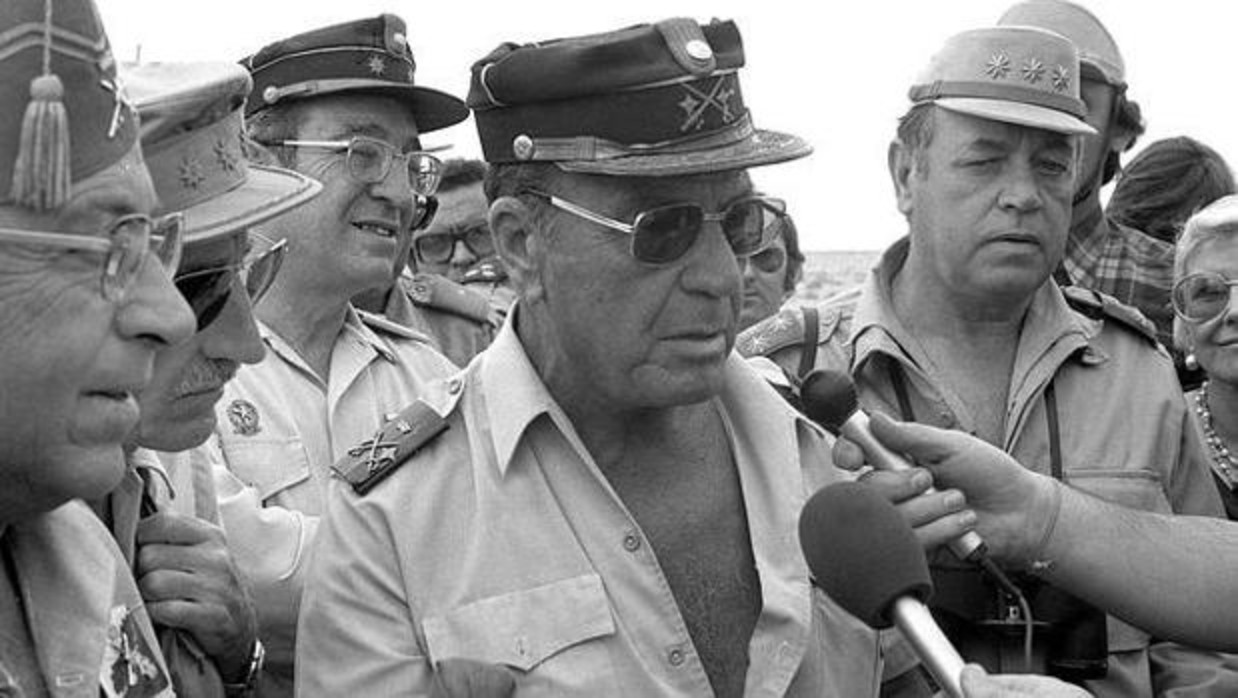
- Born: Federico Gómez de Salazar y Nieto; September 29, 1912; Toledo, Spain
- Died: January 24, 2006 (aged 93); Madrid, Spain
- Spouse: Maria Jesus Girón
- Children: 2
- Relatives: José Antonio Girón (father-in-law)
- Military career
- Allegiance: Nationalist Spain
- Branch: Spanish Army
- Service years: 1929–1982
- Rank: Lieutenant general
- Units: Regulares; Blue Division
- Commands: Armored Division No. 1 "Brunete"; I Military Region
- Conflicts: Spanish Civil War; World War II
- Awards: Military Medal; Grand Cross of the Royal and Military Order of San Hermenegild
- Other work: Governor-General of Spanish Sahara (1974–1976)

Federico Gómez de Salazar y Nieto (September 29, 1912 – January 24, 2006) was a Spanish military officer who fought for the Nationalist faction in the Spanish Civil War. He was Governor-General of Spanish Sahara when Morocco organized the Green March in 1975, and chaired the Supreme Council of Military Justice which tried the Spanish Armed Forces personnel who participated in the 1981 coup attempt.

== Biography ==
Gómez de Salazar entered the General Military Academy of Zaragoza in 1929, where he was trained by General Francisco Franco, obtaining the rank of ensign in 1932 and lieutenant in 1933. He was promoted to captain on March 24, 1937, being assigned to the Group "Ceuta" Nº 3 of the Regulares.

He participated in the Spanish Civil War, in which the Military Medal was granted to him for conduct displayed in the Regulares. He also fought on the Eastern Front of World War II, in the ranks of the Blue Division (Spanish: División Azul, German: Blaue Division), or the 250th Infantry Division of the German Wehrmacht; he was assigned to the 262nd Regiment.

In 1944, he was promoted to the rank of commander, obtaining the diploma of General Staff of the Army in 1946, and later, the diploma of General Staff of the Navy. In 1957, he was promoted to lieutenant colonel and, in 1965, to colonel. He was promoted to general in 1970, major general in September 1973, and to lieutenant general in May 1976.

Gómez de Salazar was named Governor-General of Spanish Sahara in June 1974. He achieved great public notoriety when, on 6 November 1975, he faced the Green March; the event, organized by King Hassan II of Morocco, saw approximately 350,000 unarmed Moroccan civilians invading the territory. There, he would have to organize a preventive defense, estimating that in case of violence, there would be about 30,000 casualties. He took responsibility after an emergency evacuation and demilitarization operation after the signing of the Madrid Accords, a process that would conclude in January 1976.

In 1976, back in Spain and being assigned to the General Staff, Gómez de Salazar presided over the Council of War which tried the defendants belonging to the clandestine Military Democratic Union (Unión Militar Democrática, UMD), held at Hoyo de Manzanares (Madrid) from 8 March. In January 1977 he was appointed Captain General of the I Military Region (Madrid), a position in which he remained until September 1978.

On 23 September 1981, he joined the Tribunal set up by the Supreme Council of Military Justice to try the participants of the 1981 Spanish coup d'état attempt (Case 2/81), having to assume its presidency due to illness of previous President, Lieutenant General Luis Álvarez Rodríguez, and continued in the role until he moved to the reserve, on 3 March 1982.

== Units and destinations ==
Among the units in which Gómez de Salazar served are the 37th Infantry Regiment, the Regulares of Ceuta, the General Staff of the 31st Division, the Central General Staff, the military attachés of the Spanish embassies in Turkey, Greece and Iran, the Infantry Regiment of Badajoz and the Higher School of the Army. Likewise, he was chief of the General Staff of the Captaincy General of Canary Islands and head of the División Mecanizada «Brunete» n.º 1. He later worked as a professor at the Infantry Academy, the General Staff College, and the Naval War College.

== Marriage, offspring and death ==
He was married to Maria Jesus Girón, daughter of José Antonio Girón, with whom he had two children.

He died in Madrid on 24 January 2006, at the age of 93.
