= Treaty of Angra de Cintra =

1958 treaty between Spain and Morocco

- Type: Bilateral treaty
- Signed: 1 April 1958
- Location: Bay of Cintra, Río de Oro
- Parties: Spain and Morocco

The Treaty of Angra de Cintra, signed by Spain and Morocco on 1 April 1958, ended the Spanish protectorate in Morocco and helped end the Ifni War.

The Spanish foreign minister, Fernando María Castiella y Maíz, and his Moroccan counterpart, Ahmed Balafrej, as well as their respective secretaries, met on the Bay of Cintra (Note: Many sources incorrectly place the conference in Sintra, Portugal.) in the Spanish colony of Río de Oro between 31 March and 2 April in utmost secrecy to negotiate an end to the clashes between Spain and Moroccan-supported rebels that had begun in October 1957. The resulting treaty was signed on 1 April.

On 30 June 1958, the Moroccan Army of Liberation (which was not a part of the regular Moroccan army) declared a ceasefire, bringing to an end the Ifni War.

== Terms ==
By the terms of the treaty, Spain would return to Moroccan control the southern zone of its protectorate, which it had retained even after handing over the northern zone in 1956. This zone, called Cabo Juby or the Tarfaya Strip, lay between the river Draa and the parallel 27° 40′ north.

The agreement did not give a timeline for the evacuation of Spanish troops from either the northern or southern zone of the old protectorate, but merely expressed both parties' commitment to total evacuation.

The outermost parts of Ifni which were effectively ceded in 1958, though not included in the treaty.

The Territory of Ifni, which was surrounded by Moroccan territory, was not ceded at Angra de Cintra, since it was a colony under Spanish sovereignty rather than a protectorate. It was, however, greatly reduced in size, since its outlying regions, occupied by the Ait Ba Amran tribe were abandoned (although this was not specified in the treaty). The city of Sidi Ifni itself was only ceded to Morocco in 1969.

Likewise, the agreement of Cintra did not touch upon any of Morocco's other territorial claims against Spain, either in the Sahara or the Mediterranean.

== Transfer ==
The transfer took place on 10 April in the administrative capital of Villa Bens (Tarfaya). The Moroccan heir apparent, the future Hassan II, was present at the ceremony.

On 15 April, Spain circulated a note verbale to the United Nations asserting that with the Treaty of Angra de Cintra it had completely fulfilled its declaration of 7 April 1956 terminating its protectorate.
