= Demographics of Western Sahara =

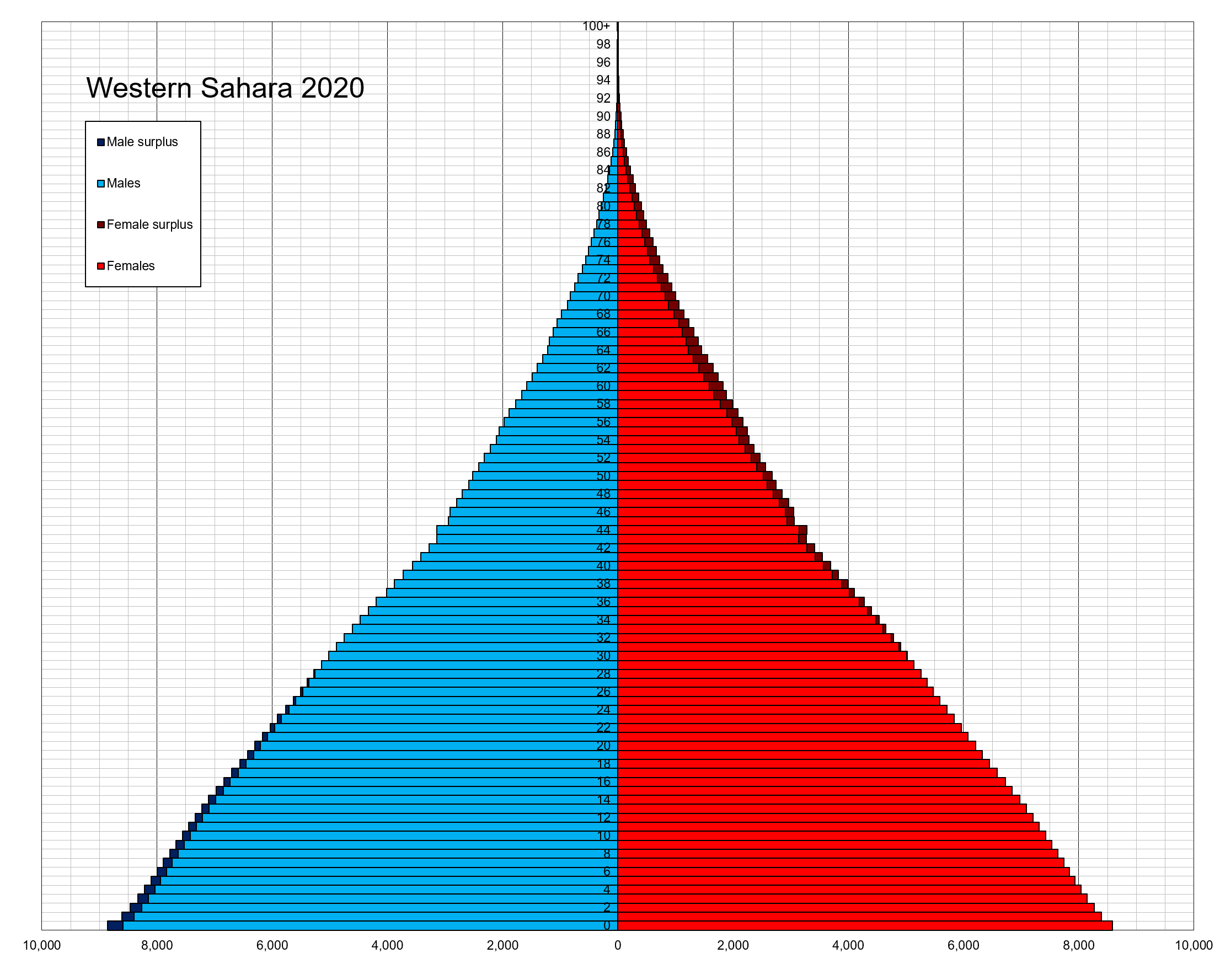
Western Sahara population pyramid in 2020

All demographic data of Western Sahara is widely regarded as being extremely prone to error. It is among the world's most sparsely populated territories and the last official census there was conducted by Spain in 1974. Currently, Western Sahara's political status is disputed between Morocco and the Sahrawi Arab Democratic Republic, which is governed by the Polisario Front. About 80% of Western Sahara is under Moroccan occupation, while the Sahrawi Arab Democratic Republic controls the rest of the territory that lies to the east of the Moroccan-built Berm. The entirety of Western Sahara is classified by the United Nations as a non-self-governing territory that is still awaiting decolonization.

Hundreds of thousands of Moroccan settlers have migrated into occupied Western Sahara since the Green March in 1975. As of 2015, it is estimated that Moroccan settlers account for at least two thirds of Western Sahara's entire population of 500,000 people. Under international law, Morocco's settlement schemes in the occupied territory constitute a direct violation of Article 49 of the Fourth Geneva Convention.

The dominant religion in Western Sahara is Sunni Islam. Major ethnic groups include Arabs and Berbers. The most common languages in the territory are Hassaniya Arabic and Moroccan Arabic.

== Demographics ==
The following demographic statistics are from the CIA World Factbook, unless otherwise indicated.

=== Languages ===
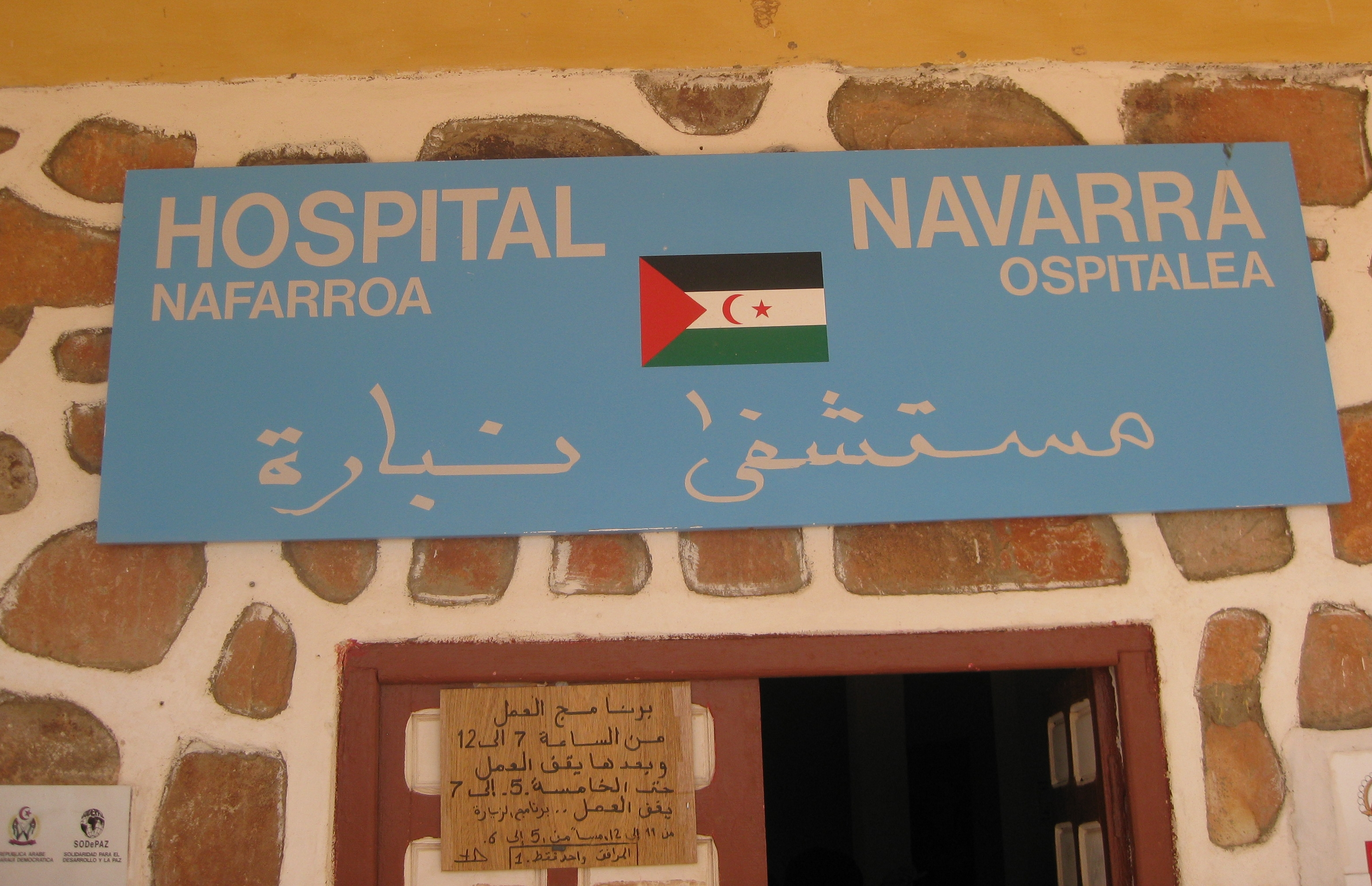
Trilingual sign in Spanish, Basque, and Arabic, at Navarra Hospital in Tifariti.

Modern Standard Arabic and Spanish are the official languages of the Polisario Front, based in Tindouf, Algeria. Hassaniya, an Arabic dialect, is the native language spoken in Western Sahara and in the refugee camps in Tindouf in Algeria. There is also a significant presence of Berber language speakers in the northern parts of the territory of Western Sahara.

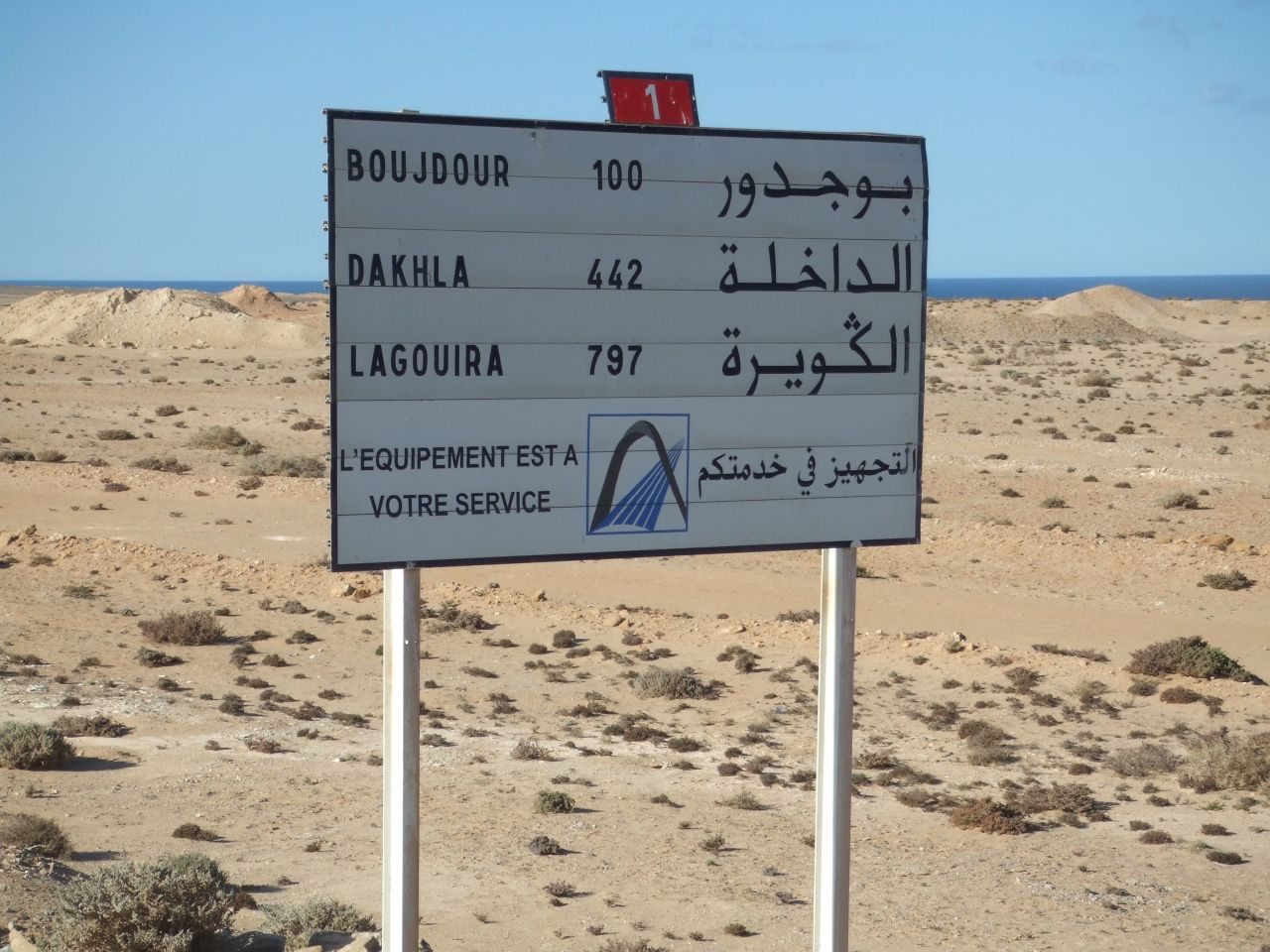
Bilingual road sign in French and Arabic, Western Sahara.

Hassaniya, primarily spoken at home, is dominated by the Moroccan dialect spoken in the streets, workplace, and schools. This is because the great majority of the population consists of Moroccans who settled in Western Sahara. French is also commonly used by the Moroccan occupation. In the urban areas Moroccan Arabic is now spoken, as Morocco occupies most of the territory of Western Sahara and all of its cities, and considers it an inseparable part of the country. The Moroccan constitution stipulates two official languages for the Kingdom of Morocco, including Western Sahara: Berber (Tamazight) and Arabic.

Spanish is common among Sahrawi people and especially among the Sahrawi diaspora, with the Sahrawi Press Service, official news service of the Sahrawi Arab Democratic Republic, being available in Spanish since 2001 and the Sahara Film Festival, Western Sahara's only film festival, showing mainly Spanish-language films. Spanish is used to document Sahrawi poetry and oral traditions and has also been used in Sahrawi literature. Despite Spanish having been used by the Sahrawi people for over a century, the Cervantes Institute does not provide support or Spanish-language education to Sahrawis in Western Sahara and the Sahrawi refugee camps in Algeria. A group of Sahrawi poets known as 'Generación de la Amistad saharaui' produces Sahrawi literature in Spanish.

=== Urbanization ===
Morocco supported rapid urbanization to facilitate surveillance and security. Today, most of the population lives in the two-thirds of the area west of the berm (Moroccan-occupied) that divides the territory. About 40% of that populace resides in Laayoune.

Urbanization rate: 80+%

=== Religions ===
Sunni Islam is the major religion in Western Sahara. Sunni Muslims constitute about 99.9% of the population. Prior to 1975, there were over 20,000 Roman Catholics in Western Sahara, but as of 2007 there were only around 100.

=== Nationality ===
Noun: Western Saharan(s), Sahrawi(s), Sahraoui(s)
adjective: Western Saharan and Sahrawi, Sahraouian

=== Population ===
1990: 191,707
2000: 244,943
2010: 491,519
2020: 652,271.

Demographics of Western Sahara, Data of FAO, year 2005; Number of inhabitants in thousands.

=== Age structure ===
2020 est.
Age	%	male	female
0-14	36.29%	119,719	116,997
15-24	19.44%	63,852	62,954
25-54	34.9%	112,301	115,313
55-64	5.27%	16,095	18,292
65 years and over	4.1%	11,802	14,946

=== Population growth rate and Birth rate ===
The population growth rate has slowed from 3.097% (2011 est.) to 2.54% (2020 est.), as the birth rate has decreased from 39.54 (2010 est.) to 28 births/1,000 population (2020 est.).

=== Death rate ===
1990 est.: 23 deaths/1,000 population

2000 est.: 16.11 deaths/1,000 population

2010 est.: 11.49 deaths/1,000 population

2020 est.: 7.7 deaths/1,000 population

=== Net migration rate ===
1990 est. : 2 migrant(s)/1,000 population

2000 est.: -6.05 migrant(s)/1,000 population

2020 est.: 4.9 migrant(s)/1,000 population

Morocco has a policy of subsidizing Moroccan settlers in the territory.

=== Infant mortality rate ===
1990 est.: 177 deaths/1,000 live births

2000 est.: 133.59 deaths/1,000 live births

2010 est.:

- total: 61.97 deaths/1,000 live births
- male: 67.13 deaths/1,000 live births
- female: 56.6 deaths/1,000 live births

2020 est.:

- total: 47.9 deaths/1,000 live births
- male: 52.5 deaths/1,000 live births
- female: 43.1 deaths/1,000 live births

=== Life expectancy at birth ===
	1990 est.	2000 est.	2010 est.	2020 est.
total population	40 years	49.81 years	54.32 years	64.5 years
male	39 years	48.65 years	52 years	62.1 years
female	41 years	51.33 years	56.73 years	67 years

=== Sex ratio ===
at birth: 1.04 male(s)/female

0-14 years: 1.02 male(s)/female

15-24 years: 1.01 male(s)/female

25-54 years: 0.97 male(s)/female

55-64 years: 0.88 male(s)/female

65 years and over: 0.79 male(s)/female

total population: 0.99 male(s)/female (2020 est.)

=== Total fertility rate ===
1990: 7.3 children born/woman

2000: 6.64 children born/woman

2010: 4.37 children born/woman

2020: 3.65 children born/woman

=== Literacy ===
definition: NA
total population: 50%
male: 75%
female: 25%

== Refugees ==
The events triggered by the Moroccan and Mauritanian joint invasion of Western Sahara at the end of 1975 are directly linked to the large displacement of the Saharawi population, most of whom live as refugees in south-west Algeria. The major bulk of Saharawis became refugees during the war between the Polisario Front and Morocco. The south-western desert region near Tindouf offered a potential safe region. Algeria, in its rivalry with Morocco, offered the Sahrawis a safe place to settle and actively supported the Polisario.

The next Saharawi exodus, although on a smaller scale, took place in 1979 when Mauritania withdrew from the conflict and Morocco annexed the rest of Western Sahara. Exact figures cannot be provided for the numbers that fled the territory in those two waves, but the estimations are between 1/3 and 2/3 of the total population at that time. The current size of the population in the refugee camps is believed to be around 165,000.

Used by the Algerian government, this figure is the most widely quoted by NGOs and is also used by the UNHCR and the World Food Programme to raise funds for food aid to the refugees. In the 2004 WFP meeting in Rome, the number of refugees was officially recognized at 158,000.

== See also ==
- Legal status of Western Sahara
- Demographics of Morocco
