= Federico Gómez (pianist) =

Argentine pianist

Federico Gómez Di Pasquo (born 1989) is an Argentine pianist.

Gómez started to play piano in 2007. From 2008 to 2014 he was student of Pía Sebastiani. In 2014, he enters the Argentine Conservatorio Nacional Superior de Música as a student of Ana María Floriani; in the same year he graduates as Professor of Music. I

In 2014, Gómez attended the Instituto Universitario Nacional del Arte (UNA) where he studied a Musical Arts major with teachers like Ana Laura Stampalia and Alfredo Corral. Gómez participated in master classes of Antonio de Raco, Carmen Piazzini, Jordi Mora, Luis Ascot, Boris Giltburg, Silvia Kersenbaum, Miguel Ángel Scebba, and he was selected to participate in the Dispotraining master class by Ingrid Zur and Jörg Heyer.

In 2014, Gómez obtained the 1st place award in the VIIº Fundación Catedral Piano Contest, and received an honorific mention in the 2nd edition of the "Concurso Pianistas Musicarte XXI". In 2015, Gómez received the 2nd Place Award in the 3rd National Piano Competition "Festival de Pianistas" in La Scala de San Telmo. He obtained the 1st Place Award of te XXIIIº National Piano Competition "Ciudad de Necochea" in the Centro Cultural "Andres Ferreyra".

Gómez also has participated in the VIIIº Festival Cervantino en la Ciudad de Azul, in the Rómulo Raggio Museum; in the Ciclo Joven de Música de Cámara, in the La Plata Argentine Theater, in the Consejo Profesional de Ciencias Económicas, in the National Library of the Argentine Republic, Jorge Luis Borges Hall; in the Museo de Arte Hispanoamericano Isaac Fernández Blanco, en la Asociación de Amigos de la Música in Zárate, Buenos Aires, in Radio Nacional, Radio Ciudad "La Once Diez", in Aleph del Centro Cultural Recoleta Auditorium, in General La Madrid (Asociación Amigos del Complejo Cultural, Evelina Aitala Hall), in Vidriera de DGEART, and Gómez was invited to participate in the 4th Festival Pianístico de la Ciudad de Azul, performing in Casa Ronco.
