= Ifni War =

1957–58 war between Morocco and Spain

- Part of the decolonisation of Africa
- Borders of the Ifni territory before and after the war.
Date	23 November 1957 – 30 June 1958 (8 months and 1 week)
Location	Ifni, Spanish Sahara, Morocco
Result	Franco−Spanish military victory; Moroccan political victory; Treaty of Angra de Cintra
Territorial changes	Areas of Ifni annexed by Morocco; Cape Juby ceded to Morocco by Spain; Sidi Ifni retained by Spain until 1969

Belligerents
(Francoist Spain) Spain; (Francoist Spain) West Africa; (French Fourth Republic) French Union (1958); (French Fourth Republic) Mauritania	Morocco; Army of Liberation; Allied Sahrawi tribes

Commanders and leaders
(Francoist Spain) Francisco Franco (Francoist Spain) Mariano Gómez-Zamalloa y Quirce (Francoist Spain) José Héctor Vázquez (France) Gaston Defferre (France) High Commissioner Gaston Cusin (France) General Gabriel Bourgund	(Morocco) Ben Hammu

Strength
15,300 men: 10,300 Spanish troops; 5,000 French troops; 150 aircraft	30,000 men

Casualties and losses
190 dead 500 wounded 80 missing	800–1,000 dead
- 7 civilian deaths

The Ifni War, sometimes called the Forgotten War (la Guerra Olvidada) in Spain, was a series of armed incursions into Spanish West Africa by Moroccan insurgents that began in November 1957 and culminated with the abortive siege of Sidi Ifni.

The city of Sidi Ifni had been ceded to the Spanish Empire in 1860 at the end of the Hispano-Moroccan War. After Morocco achieved independence in 1956, it sought to claim Spain's remaining possessions in West Africa. Violent demonstrations against Spanish rule broke out in Ifni in April 1957, and in October Moroccan militias began converging near the territory. Moroccan forces attacked in November, forcing the Spanish to abandon most of the territory and retreat to a defensive perimeter around Ifni. Supplied by the Spanish Navy from the sea, the Spanish garrison was able to resist the siege, which lasted into June 1958. In Spanish Sahara, Moroccan units, now reorganised as the Moroccan Army of Liberation, engaged in heavy fighting with Spanish forces at El Aaiún and Edchera. By February 1958, a joint Spanish and French offensive had driven the Moroccans out of Spanish Sahara.

Hostilities ceased in April 1958 (although small skirmishes still occurred) with the Treaty of Angra de Cintra, signed by the Spanish and Moroccan governments, by which Cape Juby and most of the Ifni territory were transferred to Morocco. The city of Sidi Ifni remained in Spanish possession until 1969, when, under international pressure, it was relinquished to Morocco.

== Background ==
Spanish and French protectorates in Morocco and Spanish Sahara, 1912.

Morocco ceded the city of Sidi Ifni to the Spanish Empire at the conclusion of the Hispano–Moroccan War in 1860 under the Treaty of Wad Ras, but Spain did not occupy the city until 1934. The following decades of Franco-Spanish collaboration resulted in the establishment and extension of the Spanish protectorate in Morocco south of the city to Cape Juby. In 1946, Spain's coastal and inland colonies were consolidated as Spanish West Africa.

When Morocco regained independence from France and Spain in 1956, the country expressed a keen interest in all of Spain's remaining colonial possessions in Morocco, claiming that they were historically and geographically all part of Moroccan territory. Sultan Mohammed V encouraged efforts to re-capture the land and personally funded anti-Spanish guerillas to claim Ifni back for Morocco.

== Outbreak ==
Violent demonstrations against Spanish rule erupted in Ifni on 10 April 1957, followed by civil strife and widespread killings of those loyal to Spain. In response, Spanish dictator Francisco Franco dispatched two battalions of the Spanish Legion, Spain's elite fighting force, to El Aaiún in Saguia el-Hamra in June.

Spanish military mobilisation resulted in the Royal Moroccan Army converging near Ifni. On 23 November 1957, two villages on the outskirts of Sidi Ifni, Goulimine and Bouizakarne, were occupied by 1,500 Moroccan soldiers (Moujahidine).

The encirclement of Ifni was the beginning of the Ifni War. Two more Legion battalions reached Spanish Sahara before the opening of hostilities.

=== Storming of Ifni ===
On 21 November, Spanish intelligence in Ifni reported that attacks were imminent by Moroccans and local tribes operating out of Tafraout. Two days later, Spanish lines of communication were cut, and a force of 2,000 Moroccans stormed Spanish garrisons and armories in and around Ifni.

Although the Spaniards repulsed the Moroccan drive into Sidi Ifni, two nearby Spanish outposts were abandoned in the face of Moroccan attacks and many others remained under heavy siege.

==== Tiluin ====
At Tiliuín, 60 Tiradores de Ifni (locally recruited indigenous infantry with Spanish officers and specialist personnel) struggled to hold off a force of several hundred Moroccans. On 25 November, a relief attempt was authorised. Five CASA 2.111 bombers (Spanish-built variants of the Heinkel He 111) bombed enemy positions, while an equal number of CASA 352 transports (Spanish-built versions of the Junkers Ju 52/3m) dropped a force of 75 paratroopers into the outpost. The following months saw Spanish troops retreat from the territory to a defensive perimeter around Sidi Ifni.

On 3 December, soldiers of the Spanish Legion's 6th Battalion (VI Bandera) arrived, breaking the siege and retaking the airfield. All military and civilian personnel were then evacuated overland to Sidi Ifni.

==== Telata ====
The relief of Telata was less successful. Leaving Sidi Ifni on 24 November aboard several old trucks, a platoon of the Spanish Legion paratroop battalion under Captain Ortiz de Zárate made slow progress through difficult terrain. This problem was compounded by frequent Moroccan ambushes, which by the next day had left several men wounded and forced the Spaniards off the road. On 26 November, food ran out. The Spanish, low on ammunition, resumed their advance, only to dig in again in the face of repeated enemy attacks.

The Spanish dropped rations by air, but Spanish casualties continued to mount. One of the dead was Ortiz de Zárate. On 2 December, a column of infantry, among them the erstwhile defenders of Telata, broke through the Moroccan lines and managed to escape encirclement. The survivors of the paratroop detachment reached Sidi Ifni once more on 5 December. The company had suffered two dead and fourteen wounded.

=== Siege of Sidi Ifni ===
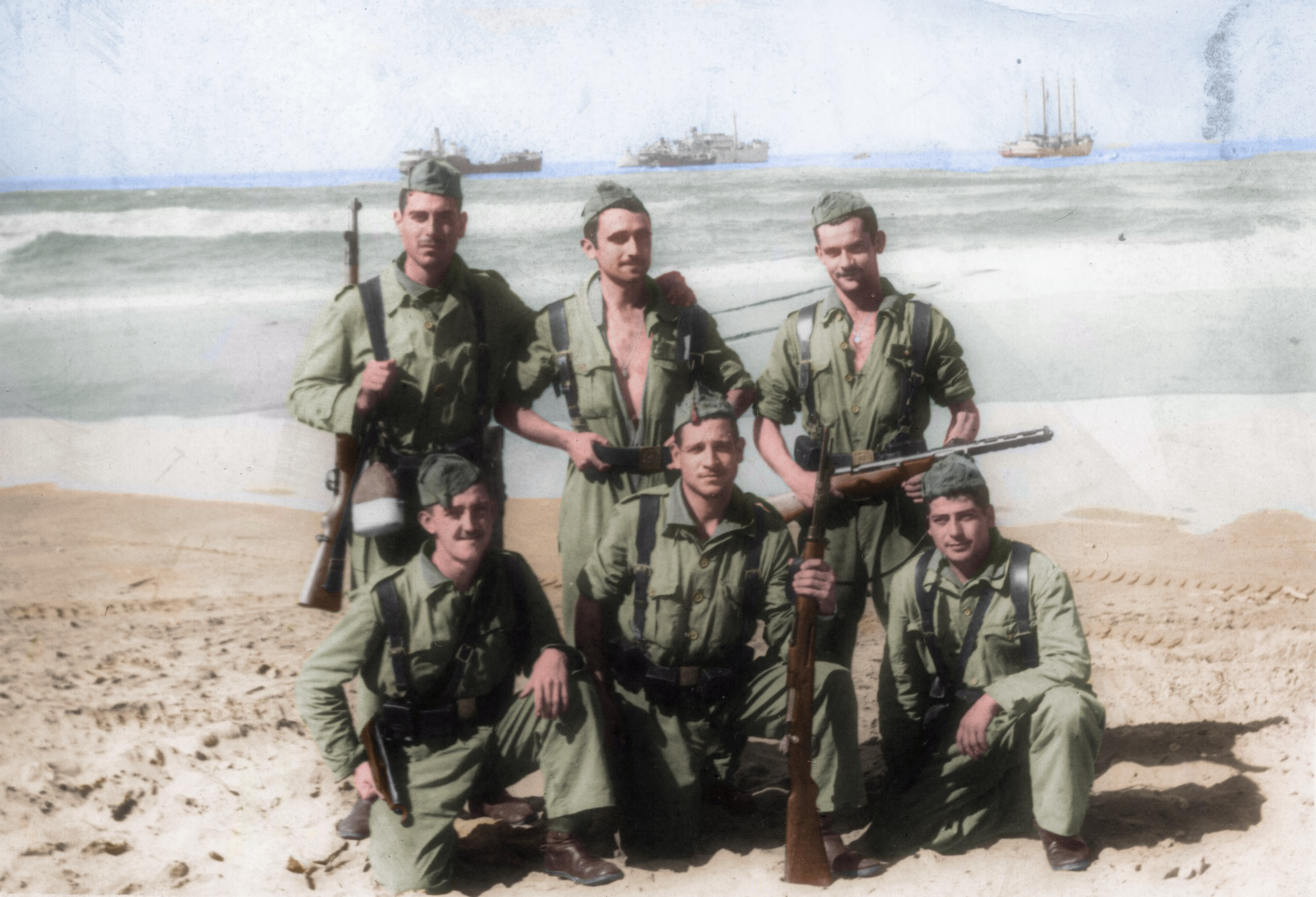
Six Spanish non-commissioned officers, most of them corporals, stand on the main beach of Sidi Ifni, moments after having disembarked (31 December 1957).

Initial Moroccan and local tribal attacks had been generally successful. In the space of a fortnight, the Moroccans and their tribal allies had asserted control over most of Ifni, isolating inland Spanish units from the capital. Simultaneous attacks had been launched throughout Spanish Sahara, overrunning garrisons and ambushing convoys and patrols.

Consequently, Moroccan units, resupplied and greatly reinforced, tried to surround and besiege Sidi Ifni, hoping to incite a popular uprising. However, the Moroccans underestimated the strength of the Spanish defences. Supplied from the sea by the Spanish Navy and protected by kilometres of trenches and forward outposts, Sidi Ifni, boasting 7,500 defenders by 9 December, proved impregnable. The siege, lasting into June 1958, was uneventful and relatively bloodless, as Spain and Morocco both concentrated resources on Saharan theatres.

=== Battle of Edchera ===
In January 1958, Morocco redoubled its commitment to the Spanish campaign, reorganising all Moroccan Army units in Spanish territory as the "Saharan Liberation Army".

On 12 January, a division of the Saharan Liberation Army attacked the Spanish garrison at El Aaiún. Beaten back and forced into retreat by the Spaniards, the Moroccan Army turned its efforts to the southeast. Another opportunity presented itself the next day at Edchera, where two companies of the 13th Legionnaire Battalion were conducting a reconnaissance mission. Slipping unseen into the large dunes near the Spanish positions, the Moroccans opened fire.

Ambushed, the Legionnaires struggled to maintain cohesion, driving off attacks with mortar and small arms fire. The 1st Platoon stubbornly denied ground to the Moroccans until heavy losses forced it to withdraw. Bloody Moroccan attacks continued until nightfall, and were fiercely resisted by the Spanish, who inflicted heavy casualties on the Moroccans. By nightfall, the Moroccans were too scattered and depleted of men to continue their assault, and retreated into the darkness.

=== Operation Écouvillon ===
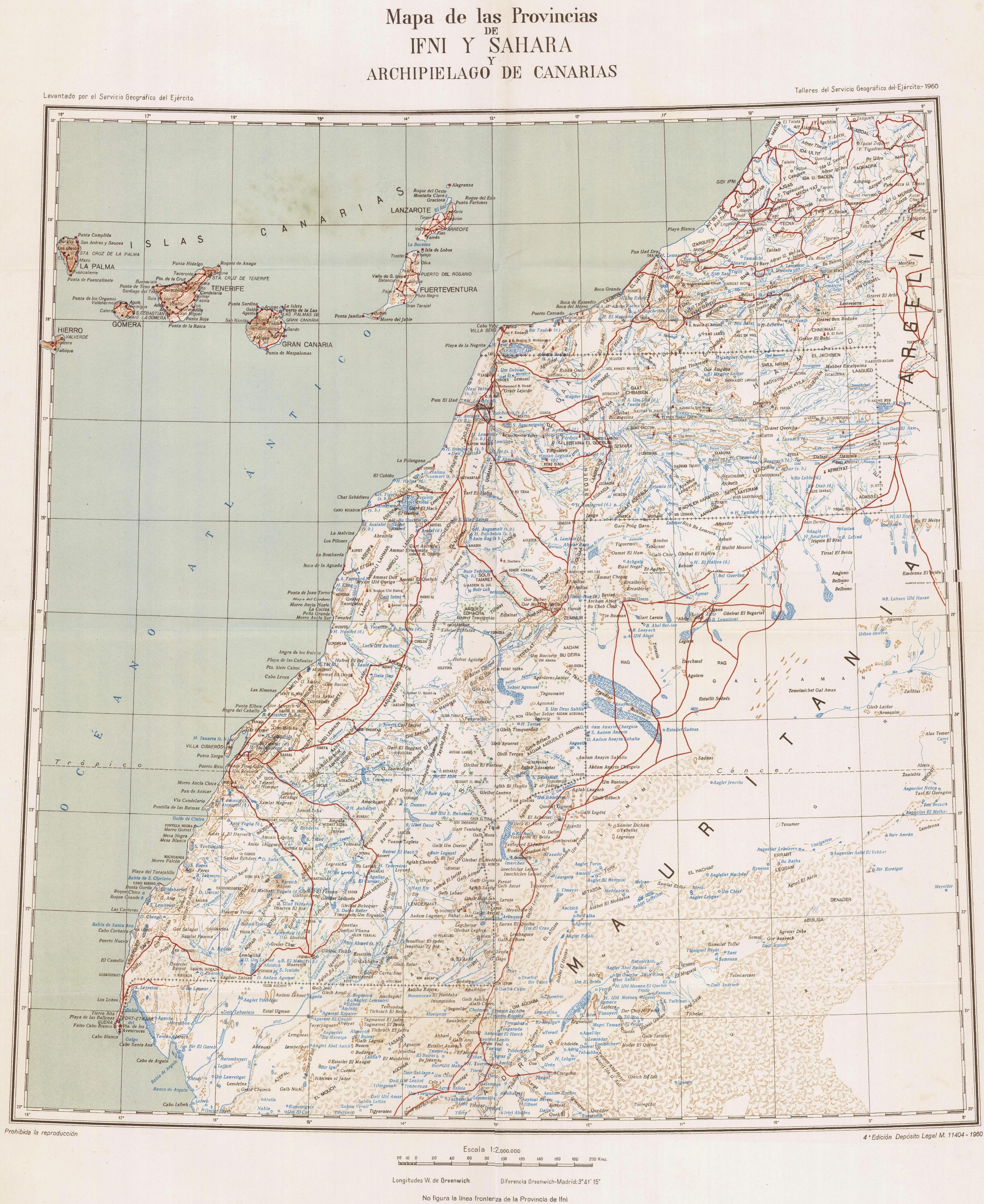
Map of Spanish Sahara, Ifni, and the Canary Islands, 1960.

In February 1958, a Franco-Spanish combined force launched an offensive that broke up the Moroccan Liberation Army. Between them, France and Spain deployed a joint air fleet of 150 planes. The Spanish were 9,000 strong and the French 5,000.

First to fall were the Moroccan mountain strongholds at Tan-Tan. Bombed from above and rocketed from below, the Liberation Army suffered 150 dead and abandoned its positions.

On 10 February, the 4th, 9th, and 13th Spanish Legion battalions, organised into a motorised group, drove the Moroccans from Edchera and advanced to Tafurdat and Smara.

The Spanish army at El Aaiún, in conjunction with French forces from Fort Gouraud, struck the Moroccans on 21 February, destroying Saharan Liberation Army concentrations between Bir Nazaran and Ausert.

== Aftermath ==
UN General Assembly Resolution 2072 (XX)
- Date: 16 December 1965
- Meeting no.: 1398
- Code: A/RES/2072(XX)
- Subject: Ifni and Spanish Sahara
- Result: Adopted

On 2 April 1958, the governments of Spain and Morocco signed the Treaty of Angra de Cintra which was named after the large bay in the area.

Morocco obtained the region of Tarfaya (Cape Juby), between the Draa River and the parallel 27°40′, and Ifni (although legally Morocco only gained full control over the territory in 1969), excluding the colony of Spanish Sahara.

Spain retained possession of Sidi Ifni until 1969, when, while under some international pressure (resolution 2072 of the United Nations from 1965), it returned the territory to Morocco. Spain kept control of Spanish Sahara until the 1975 Green March prompted it to sign the Madrid Accords with Morocco and Mauritania; it withdrew from the territory in 1976 and Western Sahara was partitioned between Morocco and Mauritania.

== Bibliography ==
- Santamaría, Ramiro. Ifni-Sahara, la guerra ignorada ("Ifni-Sahara, the Ignored War") Dyrsa, Madrid, 1984. The history of the Ifni war told by a specialised journalist in the Western Sahara.
- Casas de la Vega, Rafael. La última guerra de Africa ("The last war of Africa") Servicio de Publicaciones del Estado Mayor del Ejército, Madrid, 1985. Military analysis of the war by a Spanish general.
- Mariñas Romero, Gerardo. "La Legión española en la guerra de Ifni-Sahara" ("The Spanish Legion in the Ifni-Sahara War"). Defensa, nº 117 (1988). Article about the intervention of the Spanish Legion in the Ifni war.
- Belles Gasulla, José. Cabo Jubi-58. Memorias de un teniente de infantería en la campaña Ifni-Sahara ("Cape Jubi-58: Memoirs of an infantry lieutenant in the Ifni-Sahara campaign") Servicio de Publicaciones del Estado Mayor del Ejército, Madrid, 1990. Testimony of a Spanish officer.
- Diego Aguirre, José Ramón. "Ifni, la última guerra colonial española" ("Ifni, the last Spanish colonial war"). Historia 16, nº 167 (1990). Analysis of the Ifni war with unpublished documents.
- Diego Aguirre, José Ramón. La última guerra colonial de España: Ifni-Sahara, 1957–1958 ("The last colonial war of Spain: Ifni-Sahara, 1957–1958"). Algazara, Málaga, 1993. ISBN 978-8487999178 History of the Ifni war.
- Simón Contreras, Miguel. "Ifni y Sahara, hoy" ("Ifni and Sahara, today"). Ejército, nº 633 (1992). An officer of the Spanish Army revisits the battleground .
- Tamburini, Francesco. "Ifni-Sahara, 1957–1958: una guerra coloniale dimenticata" ("Ifni-Sahara, 1957–1958: a forgotten colonial war"). Eserciti e Storia, no. 42, a. VII, July–August 2007.

== See also ==
- List of Spanish colonial wars in Morocco
- Green March
- Sahrawi nationalism
