= Military Medal (Spain) =

- Front side of the Medalla Militar
- Type: Medal
- Awarded for: Distinguished valor
- Presented by: Spain
- Eligibility: Military personnel only
- Status: Active
- Established: 1918
- First award: Rif War

Precedence
- Next (higher): Laureate Cross of Saint Ferdinand (Royal and Military Order of Saint Ferdinand)
- Next (lower): Cruz de Guerra

The Military Medal (Spanish: Medalla Militar) is a high military award of Spain to recognise battlefield bravery.

The medal was established in 1918 by Alfonso XIII of Spain. Since then it is awarded to members of the Spanish military service independent of rank.

== Notable recipients ==
=== Spanish Civil War ===
- Emilio Mola
- Adolf Galland (Condor Legion)
- Mohamed Meziane
- Werner Mölders (Condor Legion)
- Walter Oesau (Condor Legion)
- Wilhelm Ritter von Thoma (Condor Legion)
- Wolfram Freiherr von Richthofen (Condor Legion)
- Günther Lützow (Condor Legion)
- Hans von Funck

=== Rif War ===
- Philippe Pétain (Commander-in-Chief of French Forces)
- Francisco Franco
