= Moroccan Army of Liberation =

Organisation of militias fighting for Moroccan independence from France and Spain

The Army of Liberation (Moroccan Arabic: جيش التحرير, romanized: Jish Etteḥrir; Berber languages: Aserdas Uslelli) was an organization of various loosely united militias fighting for the independence of Morocco from the French-Spanish protectorate.

It was founded in 1955 as an attempt to organise the various factions of rural Moroccan armed resistance after the assassination of the Tunisian labor unionist Farhat Hached and the forced exile of King Mohamed ben Youssef.

== History ==
=== Founding ===
It was founded in 1955 as an attempt to organise the various factions of rural Moroccan armed resistance that swept the country as a result of the assassination of Farhat Hached and the exile of king Mohamed ben Youssef. Abdelkrim El Khattabi played an important role in the instigation of the army, through commanders such as Abbas Messaadi and Sellam Amezian.

=== Ifni War ===
In 1956, units of the Army, which started to move its staff from North Spanish Morocco, began infiltrating Ifni and other enclaves of Spanish Morocco, as well as Spanish Sahara (today Western Sahara), to claim them as being part of Morocco. Initially, they received important backing from the Moroccan government. In the Spanish Sahara, the Army rallied Sahrawi tribes along the way, and triggered a large-scale rebellion. In early 1958, the Moroccan king reorganized the Army of Liberation units fighting in the Spanish Sahara as the "Saharan Liberation Army", also known as 'the Southern Liberation Army' (Armée de Libération du Sud), sometimes abbreviated as ALS. The ALS had prestigious leaders such as Abderrahmane Youssoufi, Fqih Basri and Bensaid Aït Idder.

The revolt in the Spanish Sahara was put down in 1958 by a joint French and Spanish offensive. Upon their retreat, the guerrilla fighters were, surprisingly, hindered by the regular Moroccan Army, which allowed Spanish and French forces to neutralize them. The King of Morocco then signed an agreement with the Spanish, where Spain returned the province of Tarfaya (until that agreement, part of Spanish Sahara) to Morocco. Part of the Army of Liberation was absorbed into the Moroccan armed forces.

Morocco sees the Army of Liberation battles in Western Sahara, and the fighting under Moroccan flag of Sahrawis as a proof of Western Sahara's loyalty to the Moroccan crown, whereas sympathizers to the Polisario Front view it only as an anti-colonial war directed against the Spanish. Sahrawi veterans of the Army of Liberation today exist on both sides of the Western Sahara conflict, and both the Kingdom of Morocco and the Sahrawi Arab Democratic Republic celebrate it as part of their political history. Some parents of founder members of Polisario were members of the Army of Liberation, most notably the father of Mohammed Abdelaziz the president of Polisario and the Sahrawi Arab Democratic Republic, who is living in Morocco and is a member of CORCAS..

== See also ==
- Ifni War
- Military history of Morocco
- El Hamouti Mohand Elkhadir – Moroccan anti-colonial activist (1936–1964)
