= Spanish Sahara =

Former Spanish colony and province

Coordinates: 25°N 13°W

Spanish Possessions in the Sahara (1884–1958) Posesiones españolas en el Sahara الممتلكات الإسبانية للصحراء المغربية Province of the Sahara (1958–1976) Provincia del Sahara إقليم الصحراء
- 1884–1976
- Coat of arms (1955–1975)

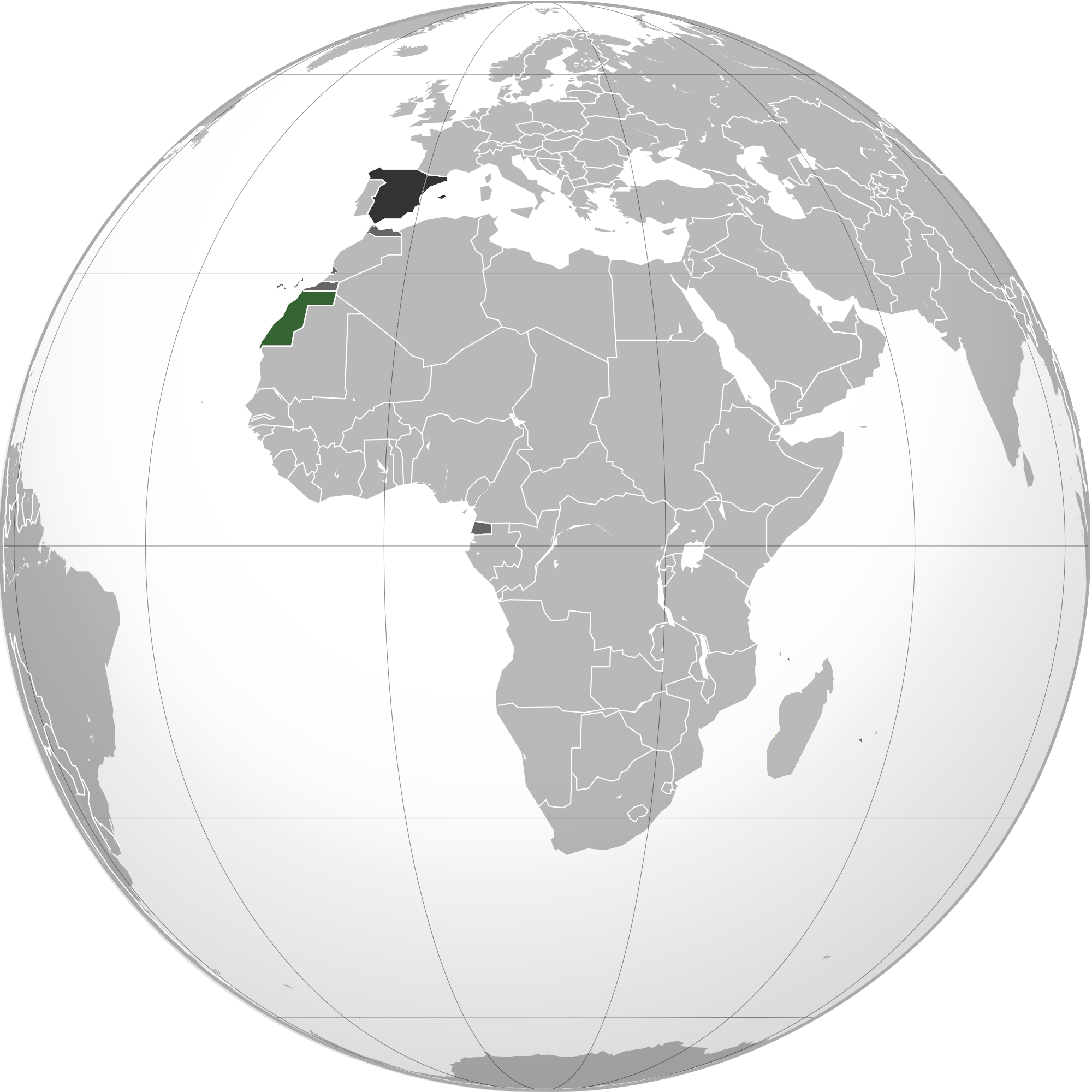
- Spanish Sahara Other Spanish possessions Spain
- Status: Colony (1884–1958); Province (1958–1976)
- Capital: Villa Cisneros (1884–1940); El Aaiún (1940–1976)
- Official languages: Spanish
- Common languages: Hassaniya Arabic
- Governor-General
  - 1884–1902 (first): Emilio Bonelli
  - 1974–1976 (last): F. Gómez de Salazar
- History
  - Berlin Conference: 26 December 1884
  - Madrid Accords: 14 November 1975
  - SADR established: 27 February 1976

Area
  - Total: 272,000 km^{2} (105,000 sq mi)

Population
  - 1970: ≈ 15,600 Europeans
  - 1974: ≈ 66,925 Sahrawis
- Currency: Spanish peseta
Preceded by
Sahrawis
Succeeded by
Moroccan-occupied Western Sahara
Tiris al-Gharbiyya
Sahrawi Republic
- Today part of: Western Sahara

Spanish Sahara (Spanish: Sahara Español; Arabic: الصحراء الإسبانية, romanized: aṣ-Ṣaḥrā' al-Isbānīyah), officially the Spanish Possessions in the Sahara from 1884 to 1958, then Province of the Sahara between 1958 and 1976, was the name used for the modern territory of Western Sahara when it was occupied and ruled by Spain between 1884 and 1976. It had been one of the most recent acquisitions as well as one of the last remaining holdings of the Spanish Empire, which had once extended from the Americas to the Spanish East Indies.

Between 1946 and 1958, the Spanish Sahara was amalgamated with the nearby Spanish-protected Cape Juby and Spanish Ifni to form a new colony, Spanish West Africa. This was reversed during the Ifni War when Ifni and the Sahara became provinces of Spain separately, two days apart, while Cape Juby was ceded to Morocco in the peace deal.

Spain gave up its Saharan possession following international pressure, mainly from United Nations resolutions regarding decolonisation. There was internal pressure from the native Sahrawi population, through the Polisario Front, and the claims of Morocco and Mauritania. After gaining independence in 1956, Morocco laid claim to the territory as part of a claimed historic pre-colonial territory. Mauritania also claimed the territory for a number of years on a historical basis.

In 1976, Mauritania and Morocco invaded the territory, now known as Western Sahara, but the Polisario Front, promoting the sovereignty of an independent Sahrawi Arab Democratic Republic, fought a guerrilla war against both, forcing Mauritania to relinquish its claim in 1979. The war against Morocco continued until 1991, when the United Nations negotiated a ceasefire and has tried to arrange negotiations and a referendum to let the population vote on its future. Today, Morocco occupies about two-thirds of the territory, while the Sahrawi Arab Democratic Republic controls the rest. Spain continues to be the de jure administering power of Western Sahara.

== Name ==
Officially the territory was called the province of Sahara from 1958 to 1976. However, before 1958 it was divided into three administrative zones, Rio De Oro, the "occupied zone" and the Southern Protectorate.

== History ==
=== Beginning ===
Since the 18th century, Spanish fishermen from the Canary Islands had been coming to the shores of Western Sahara, where fish are plentiful. At the end of the 19th century, several Africanist societies, like the Spanish Association for the Exploration of Africa, were formed to explore and colonize this still largely unknown territory. These associations formed a lobby group to put pressure on the Spanish government of Canovas de Castillo to provide government assistance to their ventures. They were assisted in this by large business interests, who hoped to capitalize on the trans Saharan caravan trade and exploit the fishing resources of the coast of Rio de Oro. They also received support from King Alfonso in the form of a donation. The Spanish also feared the French in Arguin or the British North West Africa Company may claim the region and undermine Spanish interests in Morocco and the Canaries. Despite his personal misgivings regarding the venture, due to the various reasons above, De Castillo proceeded to claim the Saharan coast for Spain at the Congress of Berlin.

=== Occupation and annexation ===
Spanish and French protectorates in Morocco and Spanish Sahara, 1935

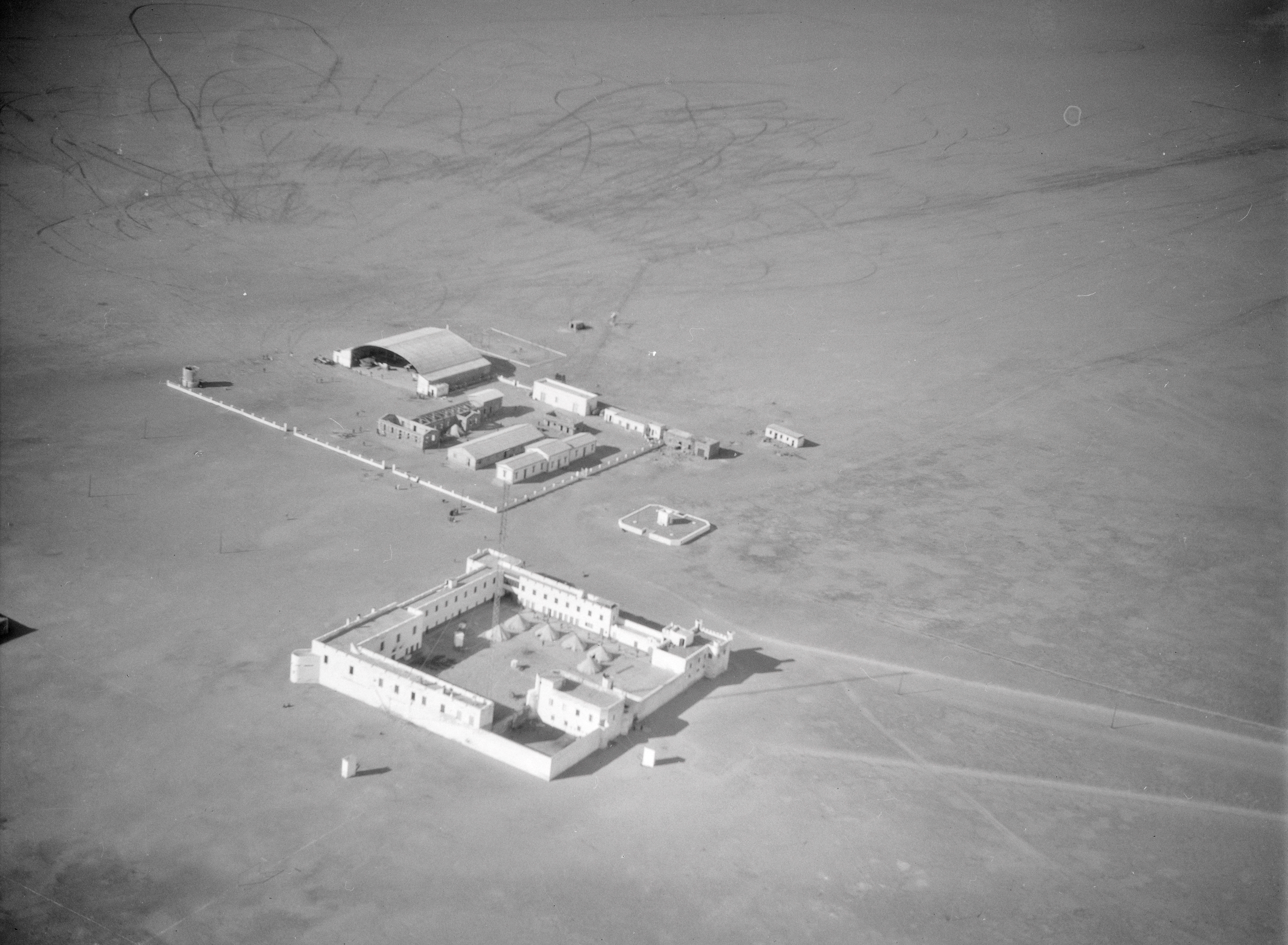
Villa Cisneros fortress and aircraft booth, 1930 or 1931

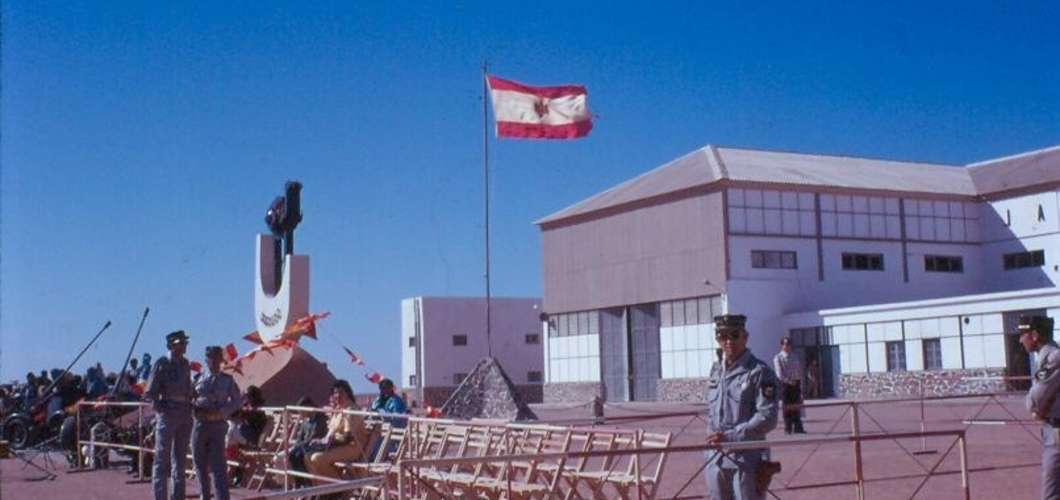
Spanish barracks in El Aaiún, 1972

In September 1881, the Sociedad Pesquerías Canario-Africanas built a pontoon in the Rio de Oro bay after they were ceded the Dakhla peninsula by local leaders. In 1884, fearing a British or French takeover of the region the Sociedad Española de Africanistas y Colonistas sent Emilio Bonelli to the Saharan coast to negotiate with the tribes to establish a Spanish presence. On 28 November 1884, Bonelli signed a treaty with three representatives of the Oulad Bou Sbaa which authorised the establishment of trading posts in Río de Oro, Cape Blanc and Angra de Cintra.

Using Bonelli's treaty as justification, the Africanistas persuaded the Spanish government to declare a protectorate over Rio de Oro, Cape Blanc and Angra de Cintra in December 1884. Their claim was later ratified at the Berlin Conference the following month. However the Spanish only settled in Rio de Oro. Construction of a fort was begun in January 1885 by the Spanish Africa Commercial Company at Rio de Oro. However it was later abandoned in May due to an attack from the Oulad Delim. However Canovas de Castillo pledged to the Cortes to maintain the Spanish presence, and the fort was reoccupied by a detachment of soldiers commanded by Captain Jose Chacon in June. They rebuilt the fort, naming it Vila Cisneros after the Cardinal Cisneros. To protect the newly founded settlement a garrison of 25 troops were left there, who would be relieved every three months by a supply ship from the Canary islands. Despite this the Oulad Delim attacked again in 1887, 1892 and 1894, only stopping in 1895 after an agreement with Sheikh Ouled Laroussi, a powerful leader in the tribe. To further cement Spanish control on 10 July 1885, Spain proclaimed a protectorate over the coast from Cape Bojador to Cape Blanc under the authority of the Overseas Ministry. Bonelli was appointed the Royal Commissioner, who would administer the protectorate, make treaties with the natives and command all armed forces within it. A further decree in 1887 extended Spanish jurisdiction 150 miles inland, declared the region a Spanish colony and transferred authority to a "politico-military sub governor" resident in Vila Cisneros and subordinate to the Captain General of the Canary Islands. In the summer of 1886, under the sponsorship of the Spanish Society of Commercial Geography (Sociedad Española de Geografía Comercial), Julio Cervera Baviera, Felipe Rizzo (1823–1908) and Francisco Quiroga (1853–1894) traversed the territory, and made topographical and astronomical observations. At the time, geographers had not mapped the territory and its features were not widely known. Their trek is considered the first scientific expedition in that part of the Sahara. They managed to reach the salt pans of Idjil and there on 12 July 1886 signed a treaty with the Emir of Adrar and Saharawi chieftains which ceded to Spain control over vast areas of desert. However Spain could never assert these claims due to diplomatic weakness and a lack of resources to actually occupy these vast areas.

On 27 June 1900 France and Spain signed the Treaty of Paris, which defined the border between the Spanish Sahara and French Mauritania. These borders were clarified by a convention in 1904, where Spain lost vast claims in Southern Morocco. The 1904 convention also recognized Spain's right to Santa Cruz de Mar Pequena, arbitrarily located at Ifni and given fixed frontiers. Hoping to compensate Spain for this loss of territory, France recognized unconditional Spanish sovereignty in Seigua El Hamra. In 1912 Morocco became a French Protectorate after the Treaty of Fez, which meant a final treaty regarding the Spanish possessions was now required. A final convention on 12 November 1912 demarcated the final borders between the French and Spanish Zones in Morocco. In this convention the Spanish zone was relegated to a small strip of coastline and a portion of the Rif Mountains in the North. The Spanish also lost influence in the South, only being given a protectorate over an area sandwiched between the Draa river and parallel 27° 40'. This was known as the Spanish Southern Morocco. It was separated from the de jure Spanish Ifni by French ruled territory. However it further confirmed direct Spanish sovereignty over Seigua El Hamra.

=== Ma El Ainin ===
Despite the vast size of the territories gained by Spain, its presence remained restricted to the settlement of Vila Cisneros and two small settlements on the Saharan coast, established in 1916 and 1920 respectively. It was the French, far more aggressive, who advanced into the Sahara and Mauritania southwards from Algeria and northwards from Senegal. In 1898, the Sahrawi marabout Ma El Ainin built the city of Smara five miles south of the Saigua El Hamra with the assistance of the Sultan of Morocco. Alarmed by the French and Spanish presence in the region, he urged the Saharan tribes to resist colonial incursions. In this endeavor he was assisted by Sultan Abd al Aziz of Morocco, who provided him arms and financial support in exchange for protecting Morocco's southern frontier. In 1905, responding to a plea from its Emir Bakar, Ma El Ainin sent his son to the Tagant region to assure him that arms would be provided from Morocco. However Bakar was killed in battle against the French in 1904. El Ainin also may have been behind the assassination of Xavier Coppolani, the French commissioner of Mauritania, at Tidjikdja on 12 May 1905. This was seen as a victory by El Ainin, who believed that the war would now go in their favor. This was followed up by a victory by forces commanded by the uncle of the Sultan, Moulay Idris, against French units in Tagant in October 1906. They began sieging the outpost of Tidjikdja, which had to be called off after a French relief column broke through in December 1906. After this defeat Ma El Ainin went to Morocco to seek additional support. However he found that the Abd al Aziz's resolve against the Europeans was weakening, seen with his acceptance of the Act of Algeciras, which placed Morocco's ports, police and finances under Franco-Spanish control. Furthermore, when the French occupied Oudja in March 1907 and French troops landed in Casablanca, he was unable to offer any resistance. This resulted in El Ainin declaring his support for the Sultan's brother Abd al Hafid when he rose in rebellion in August 1907. However El Ainin was dismayed when Abd al Hafid also recognized the Act of Algeciras in 1909. El Ainin also faced a renewed French threat to the south, as French forces under Colonel Henri Gouraud swept northwards, seizing Adrar. Ma El Ainin was forced to abandon Smara and settled in Tiznit, where he proclaimed himself Sultan in June 1910. He gathered a six thousand strong army and marched out to take the capital of Fez and depose the Sultan. However his army was defeated by French forces under General Moinier on 23 June. He fled back to Tiznit and died on 28 October 1910.

=== French victory ===
Ahmed al-Hiba, one of Ma al-'Aynayn's sons, was proclaimed Sultan in 1912. Assisted by the various tribal rebellions that occurred against Abd al Hafid after he signed the Treaty of Fez in March 1912, Al Hiba marched on Marrakech. In August, he made a triumphant entry into Marrakech at the head of 10,000 men, where the notables of the city acknowledged him as Sultan. Three days before the capture of Marrakech, Abd al Hafid had abdicated and was replaced by his French supported brother, Moulay Yusuf. However a French Army under Colonel Mangin defeated al Hiba on 6 September and entered Marrakech. Al Hiba fled south into the Sous, where he held out until 1913 when French troops under General Lyautey captured Agadir and Taroudant. He then fell back to the anti Atlas mountains, where a guerrilla struggle continued intermittently until 1934.

During the First World War, the Germans and Turks attempted to arm the nomads against the French. A German submarine delivered weapons in 1916, but the crew was captured shortly afterward at Cape Juby by the Spanish. Al-Hiba, pushed back into the Anti-Atlas Mountains, died in 1919; his brother, Merebbi Rebbu, took command of the resistance. Throughout all this the rebels had used Spanish territory as a base from which to launch their attacks against the French in Algeria, Mauritania and Morocco, with little interference from the Spanish.

=== Assertion of Spanish control ===
From the demarcation of the boundaries of the colony with the French, the Spanish made very little effort to expand into the interior of their nominal colony. Despite this there was an effort by Governor Francisco Bens to expand Spanish control through assuring the tribes of the peaceful intentions of the Spanish, in contrast to the aggressive French. This effort was only partially successful, with Bens occupying Tarfaya (later Vila Bens in 1946) in 1916 and La Guera in 1920. However he was unsuccessful in attempting to occupy Ifni in 1911 and Tarfaya in 1914. In both cases he was ordered to desist by the Spanish government. This was down mainly to a lack of support from the government in Madrid, who feared acting independently of the French and was more focused with occupying Northern Spanish Morocco. At the time of Bens' departure in 1920 there were 703 Spanish soldiers in the colony, with the bulk of them being based in Tarfaya to protect the newly built aerodrome. They were supported by six planes of the Air Force from 1928. Furthermore, in 1926 a native Saharan police force based on the French groupes nomades was founded. In 1932 a penal colony was founded at Vila Cisneros. After briefly considering a handover of the Sahara to the League of Nations in 1931 the Republican government of Spain pursued a more aggressive colonial policy. This can be seen with their decision to finally occupy Ifni in 1934. After occupying Ifni a detachment of Saharan auxiliaries under the command of Captain Galo Bullon and Lieutenant Carlos de la Gandara set out from Tarfaya, occupying the town of Daora on 1 May and Smara on 15 May. By the end of 1934 the Spanish had fully occupied their erstwhile colony, agreeing with the French to send out regular patrols to police the Sahrawi tribesmen.

=== The Forgotten Colony (1934–1958) ===
After securing Spanish rule in 1934 the Republican government decreed that the High Commissioner for Morocco would double as the Governor General of Ifni and the Sahara. Furthermore, the budget for Ifni and Sahara would be annexed into the budget of Spanish Morocco. With the outbreak of the Spanish civil war the Delegate to the Sahara, Antonio de Oro, immediately defected to the Nationalists. The war only had a minimal impact in the Sahara, with the Nationalists not recruiting heavily from the Sahrawis.

The Sahrawi way of life changed little under Spanish administration: they remained nomadic pastoralists with their own traditions, including customary assemblies (djemaa), and their own legal system (Islamic Sharia and customary law). The Spanish presence itself was limited to a few small towns where trade with the nomads took place. Slavery was still prevalent across the territory; this was ignored by the Spanish who wished to maintain good relations with the nomads, although escaped slaves were given asylum in the Spanish settlements. However, Spanish rule saw changes in Sahrawi society, with the end of tribal raiding resulting in prosperity for many tribes like the Oulad Tidrarin. Furthermore, tribes like Oulad Delim maintained their martial traditions by joining the Tropas Nomadas. The barter economy was also replaced with money during this period. The town of El Aaiún was founded in 1940 after the discovery of a significant aquifer.

Throughout the Spanish colonial period, Spanish settlers were few in number, never exceeding 15,000. This was further hampered by the fact that from 1947 all non Sahrawis needed various permits to visit, work or settle in the territory. Many worked in the fishing industry along the coast, where fish were plentiful, but they could not compete with the fishermen of the Canary Islands, who were more organized and closer to the open sea. Additionally, many Spaniards worked in the colonial administration or public works. However, the majority served in the army or the Foreign Legion, which maintained order in the territory.

In World War II, some in the Spanish government wanted to extend the borders of the colony into Mauritania, using the 1886 treaty with the Emir of Adrar as justification. This was part of a wider proposal to expand the Spanish Empire in Africa at the expense of the French. However this did not happen due to a lack of interest, Axis reversals in Africa and the poverty of Spain in the aftermath of the Civil War. In 1947, fearing Moroccan nationalism, Spain established Spanish West Africa (África Occidental Española), consisting of Ifni and Western Sahara. The Tarafaya strip was not included, despite the Governor General of Spanish West Africa being responsible for its administration in his role as Delegate of the High Commissioner. The only real industries were fishing and the harvesting of seaweed. Additionally, Spain was gradually becoming more aware of the vast mineral resources in the territory, with the INI carrying out research expeditions after 1952.

=== Ifni War (1956–1958) ===
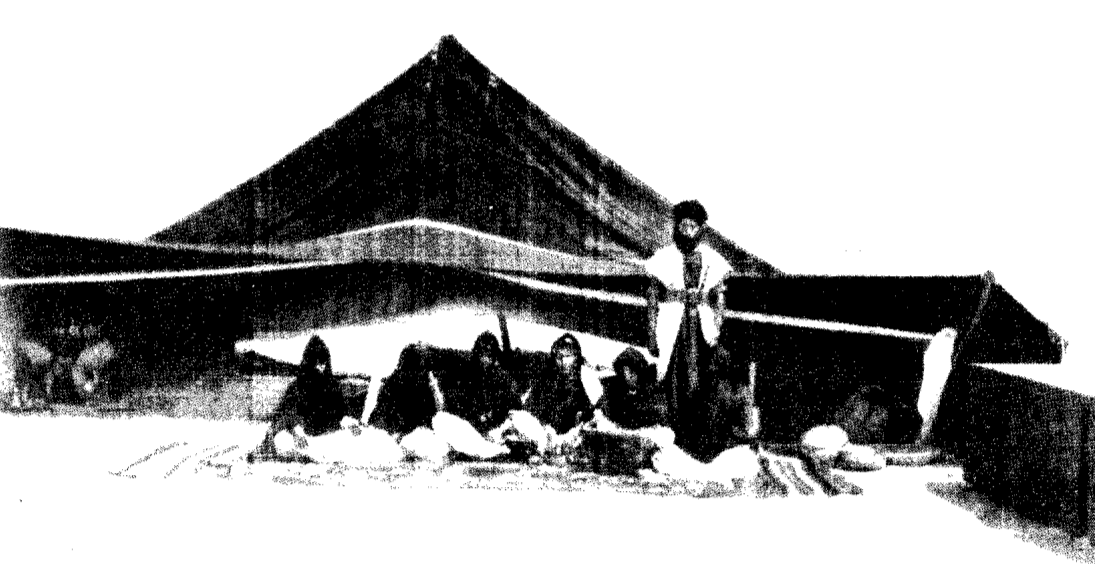
Sahrawi family in Spanish Sahara between 1970 and 1974

In March 1956 Morocco became independent from France. Spain followed suit in April 1956, recognizing it's territorial integrity and ceding the Northern Zone of the Protectorate. However Franco was reluctant to abandon Cape Juby, Ifni and the Sahara, believing in the "civilizing mission", wanting to keep the territory as a base for the Foreign Legion and wanting to mollify Army officers who had only reluctantly accepted the withdrawal from Morocco. However nationalist developments in the North had reached Southern Morocco, with the Moroccan Army of Liberation taking over much of the Souss and Anti Atlas Mountains, endangering Spanish control over Ifni and the Sahara. They also used Spanish territory as a base to launch attacks on French troops in Mauritania. In response the French Minister for Defence, Gaston Deferre, with the approval of the Spanish, ordered French troops to pursue the guerillas into the Spanish Sahara.

The Army of Liberation had encouraged the tribes of the Ifni and Sahara to revolt against Spanish rule, with 25 Sahrawis joining the Liberation Army. This effort was successful, with many tribes in the Sahara joining the revolt. In 1957, the Liberation Army nearly occupied the small territory of Ifni, north of Spanish Sahara, during the Ifni War. The Spanish sent a regiment of paratroopers from the nearby Canary Islands and repelled the attacks. With the assistance of the French, Spain soon re-established control in the area through Operaciones Teide-Ecoubillon (Spanish name) / Opérations Ecouvillon (French name).

=== Territorial dispute (1958–1973) ===
Spain tried to suppress resistance politically. It forced some of the previously nomadic inhabitants of Spanish Sahara to settle in certain areas, and the rate of urbanisation was increased. In 1958, Spain united the territories of Saguia el-Hamra and Río de Oro to form the overseas province of Spanish Sahara, while ceding the province of the Cape Juby strip (which included Villa Bens) in the same year to Morocco.

In the 1960s, Morocco continued to claim Spanish Sahara. It gained agreement by the United Nations to add the territory to the list of territories to be decolonised. In 1969, Spain ceded Ifni to Morocco, but continued to retain Spanish Sahara.

In 1967, Spanish rule was challenged by the Harakat Tahrir, a Sahrawi movement created by Muhammad Bassiri. In 1970, Spain suppressed the Zemla Intifada.

In 1973, the Polisario Front was formed in a revival of militant Sahrawi nationalism. The Front's guerrilla army grew rapidly, and Spain lost effective control over most of the territory by early 1975. Its effort to found a political rival, the Partido de Unión Nacional Saharaui (PUNS), met with little success. Spain proceeded to co-opt tribal leaders by setting up the Djema'a, a political institution loosely based on traditional Sahrawi tribal leaders. The Djema'a members were hand-picked by the authorities, but given privileges in return for rubber-stamping Madrid's decisions.

Morocco asserts that the territory was under Moroccan royal sovereignty at the time when the Spanish claimed it in 1884. To back its claims the country cites two sixteenth-century treaties, the Treaty of Alcáçovas and the Treaty of Cintra, between Spain and Portugal, where both countries recognize that the authority of Morocco extended beyond Cabo Bojador. Other treaties extending the authority further south are also raised, like the one between the Sharifian Sultanate and Spain of 1 March 1767 or the Anglo-Moroccan Agreement of 13 March 1895. However, the International Court of Justice found in their Advisory opinion on Western Sahara of 1975 that those treaties only proved ties of allegiance (Bay'ah) between this territory and the Kingdom of Morocco, and were not legal ties extending to sovereignty over the territory.

In the winter of 1975, just before the death of its long-time dictator Generalissimo Francisco Franco, Spain was confronted with an intensive campaign of territorial demands from Morocco and, to a lesser extent, from Mauritania. These culminated in the Marcha Verde ('Green March'), where a mass demonstration of 350,000 Moroccans coordinated by the Moroccan government advanced several kilometres into the Western Sahara territory, bypassing the International Court of Justice's Advisory opinion on Western Sahara that had been issued three weeks prior. After negotiating the Madrid Accords with Morocco and Mauritania, Spain withdrew its forces and citizens from the territory.

Morocco and Mauritania took control of the region. Mauritania later surrendered its claim after fighting an unsuccessful war against the Polisario Front. In the process of annexing the region, Morocco started fighting the Polisario Front, and after sixteen years, the UN negotiated a cease-fire in 1991. Today, the sovereignty of the territory remains in dispute between Morocco and the Sahrawi people, and referendum has not been possible to date due to dispute over who can vote.

== Present status ==
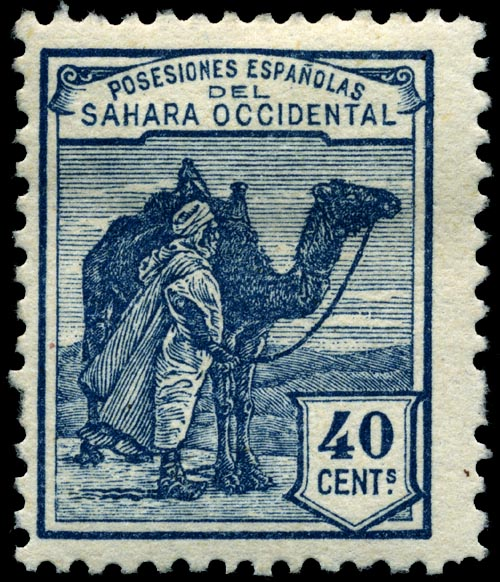
Postage stamp issued in 1924

Western Sahara is listed by the United Nations (UN) as a non-decolonized territory and is thus included in the United Nations list of non-self-governing territories. Under international law, Western Sahara is not a legal part of Morocco, and it remains under the international laws of military occupation. Officially, the Kingdom of Spain remains as Western Sahara's de jure administering power as affirmed by the criminal division of the Spanish National High Court ruling in 2014. This position is shared by the United Nations, the African Union, and several legal jurists. Additionally, Spain continues to administer the Western Saharan airspace.

Moroccan settlers currently make up more than two thirds of the inhabitants of the territory. Under international law, Morocco's transfer of its own civilians into occupied territory is in direct violation of Article 49 of the Fourth Geneva Convention.

UN peace efforts have been directed at holding a referendum on independence among the Sahrawi population, but this has not yet taken place. The Sahrawi Arab Democratic Republic has been recognized by 84 UN member states and the African Union (of which it is a founding member).

== See also ==
- List of colonial governors of Spanish Sahara
- International Court of Justice Advisory Opinion on Western Sahara
- History of Western Sahara
- Moroccan Army of Liberation
- Southern Provinces
- Tiris al-Gharbiyya
- Sahrawi Arab Democratic Republic
- Spanish West Africa
