= Tioughza =

Tioughza ⵜⵢⵓⵖⵣⴰ تيوغزة
- Rural commune and town
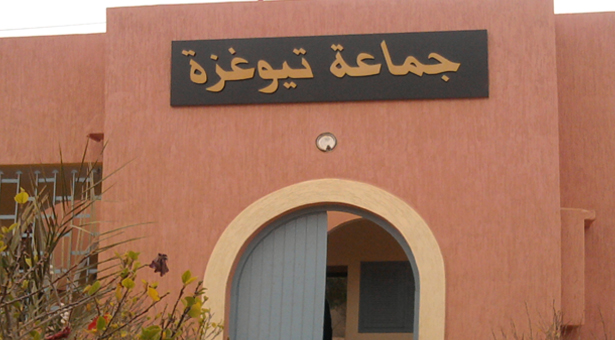
- Interactive map of Tioughza
- Country: Morocco
- Region: Guelmim-Oued Noun
- Province: Sidi Ifni

Population (2004)
  - Total: 12,268
- Time zone: UTC+0 (GMT)

Tioughza is a small town and rural commune in Sidi Ifni Province of the Guelmim-Oued Noun region of Morocco. At the time of the 2004 census, the commune had a total population of 12,268 people living in 2,168 households.
