= Sebt Ennabour =

Coordinates: 29.42201°N 9.56624°W

- Rural commune and town
- Interactive map of Sebt Ennabour
- Country: Morocco
- Region: Guelmim-Oued Noun
- Province: Sidi Ifni

Population (2004)
  - Total: 8,329
- Time zone: UTC+0 (GMT)

Sebt Ennabour is a small town and rural commune in Sidi Ifni Province of the Guelmim-Oued Noun region of Morocco. At the time of the 2004 census, the commune had a total population of 8,329 people living in 1,350 households.
