= Tan-Tan =

Town in Guelmim-Oued Noun, Morocco

Tan-Tan ⵟⴰⵏⵟⴰⵏ
- City
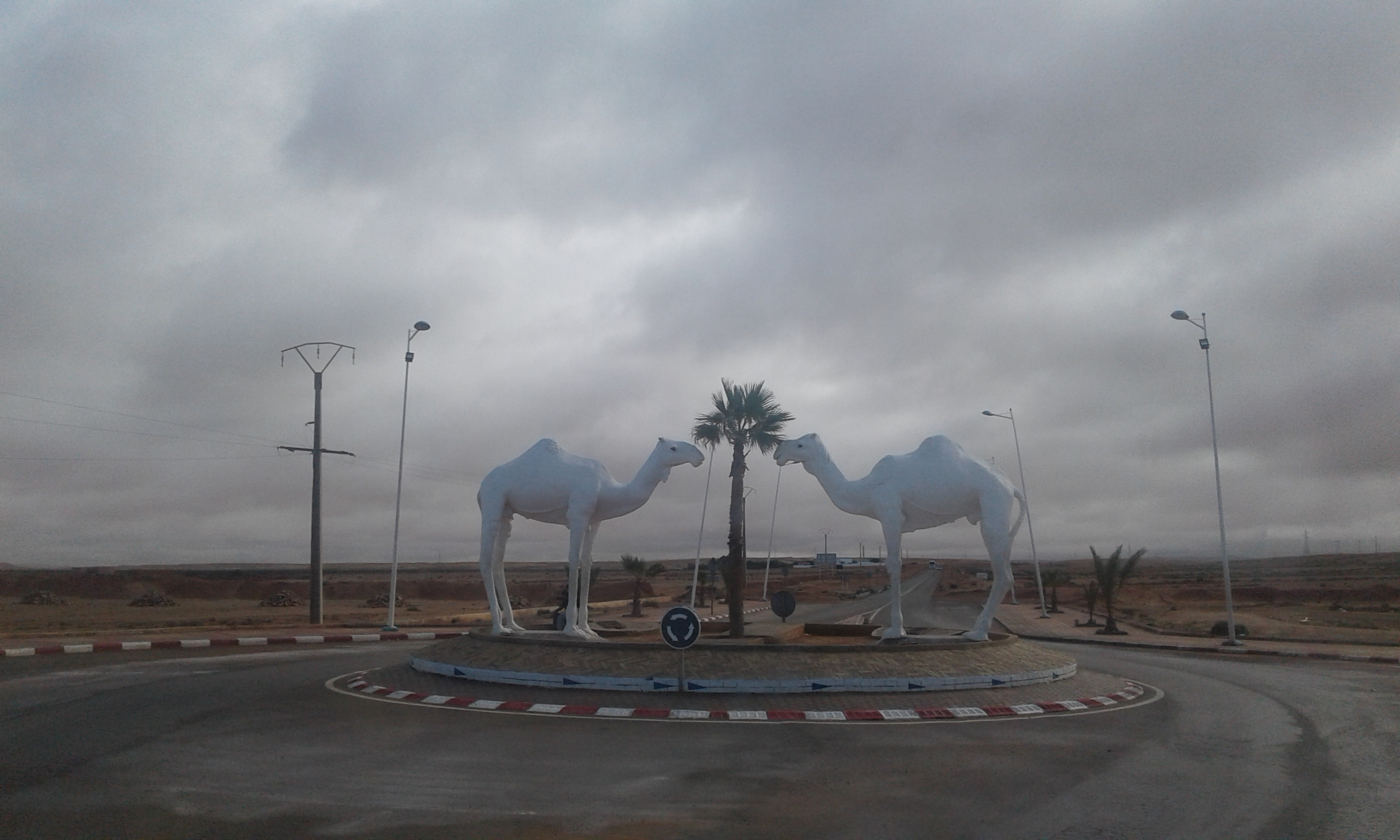
- Two camel statues mark the entrance to Tan-Tan, 2009
- Interactive map of Tan-Tan
- Coordinates: 28°26′N 11°06′W
- Country: Morocco
- Region: Guelmim-Oued Noun
- Province: Tan-Tan
- Elevation: 51 m (167 ft)

Population (2014)
  - Total: 73,209
- Time zone: UTC+0 (GMT)

Tan-Tan (Arabic: طانطان, romanized: Ṭānṭān; Berber languages: ⵟⴰⵏⵟⴰⵏ, romanized: Ṭanṭan) is a city in Tan-Tan Province in the region of Guelmim-Oued Noun in southwestern Morocco. It is a desert town with a population (2014 census) of 73,209. It is the largest city in the province and second largest city in the region after the capital Guelmim. It is located on the banks of the wadi Oued Ben Khelil, which flows into the Draa River 15 kilometres (9.3 mi) north of the town. The Draa River at 1,100 kilometres (684 mi) is the longest in Morocco and flows into the Atlantic Ocean soon after the confluence with the wadi. The town also has an airport, Tan Tan Plage Blanche Airport.

== Etymology ==
The popular origin of the name is an example of onomatopoeia. The name comes from the well called Ḥāṣī Ṭānṭān literally "well of Tan-Tan", which representatives of most Sahrawi tribes like the Reguibat, Laaroussien and the Ait Lahcin of the Tekna would camp around. The well is called this because when buckets were lowered into the water into it would make the sound ṭān-ṬĀN when they hit it.

== History ==
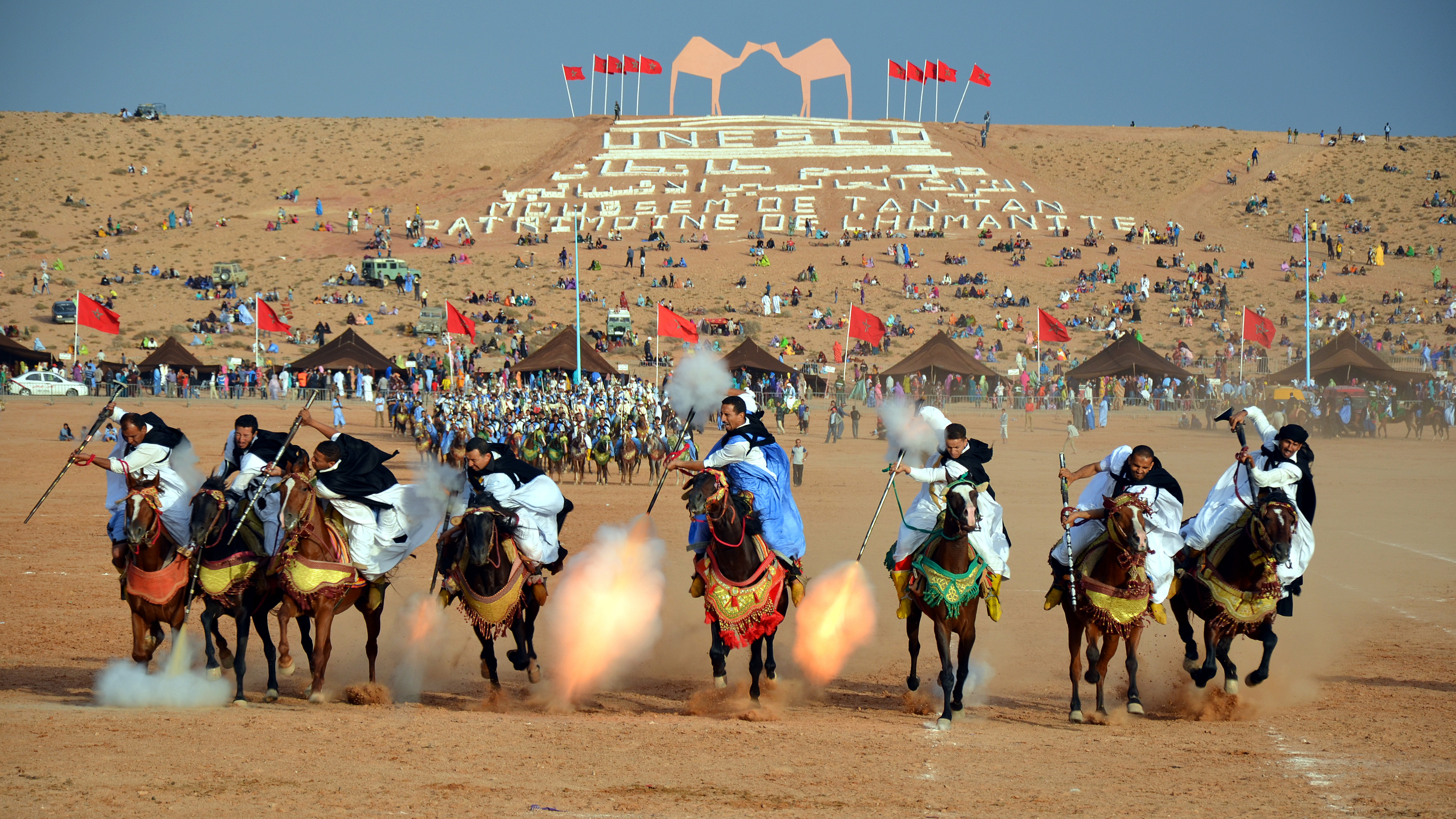
Sahrawi tribal men performing fantasia at the Tan-Tan (Moussem) Festival in Tan-Tan, Morocco

The quartz figurine Venus of Tan-Tan was found in a river terrace deposit on the north bank of the Draa River. Dated between 200,000 and 500,000 BCE, it is considered one of the oldest human-form sculptures in the world, although its formation may actually be natural.

== Port ==
The nearby port, known as Tan-Tan Plage in French; Port of Tan-Tan in English; and El Ouatia, or الوطية in Arabic is about 25 kilometres (16 mi) west of Tan-Tan on the Atlantic Ocean. With a population in 2004 of 6,294 it is the second-largest settlement in the province and ninth-largest in the region. Both Tan-Tan and Tan-Tan Plage are on Morocco's main highway, the N1.

== Climate ==
Tan-Tan has a hot desert climate (Köppen climate classification BWh). While usually strongly moderated by the cold offshore Canary Current, occasional easterly winds from the Sahara Desert interior bring exceptionally hot temperatures to the maritime areas of southern Morocco. These winds being frequent in autumn and seasonal lag from warming sea temperatures cause October afternoons to average warmer than the July counterparts. The varying timing of the hot inland winds causes a vast difference between the individual monthly mean maxima and the many months in which brief temperatures above 40 °C (104 °F) may occur. Even the coldest winter nights remain well above freezing due to the Atlantic influence.

Climate data for Tan-Tan (1991–2020)
Month	Jan	Feb	Mar	Apr	May	Jun	Jul	Aug	Sep	Oct	Nov	Dec	Year
Record high °C (°F)	30.4 (86.7)	36.6 (97.9)	38.5 (101.3)	40.7 (105.3)	44.0 (111.2)	45.0 (113.0)	47.6 (117.7)	48.2 (118.8)	42.8 (109.0)	40.6 (105.1)	36.1 (97.0)	30.4 (86.7)	48.2 (118.8)
Mean daily maximum °C (°F)	20.7 (69.3)	21.4 (70.5)	23.1 (73.6)	22.5 (72.5)	23.3 (73.9)	24.2 (75.6)	25.6 (78.1)	26.9 (80.4)	26.6 (79.9)	26.5 (79.7)	24.1 (75.4)	21.7 (71.1)	23.9 (75.0)
Daily mean °C (°F)	16.2 (61.2)	17.0 (62.6)	18.4 (65.1)	18.5 (65.3)	19.5 (67.1)	20.8 (69.4)	22.1 (71.8)	23.1 (73.6)	22.6 (72.7)	22.0 (71.6)	19.5 (67.1)	17.4 (63.3)	19.8 (67.6)
Mean daily minimum °C (°F)	11.7 (53.1)	12.5 (54.5)	13.7 (56.7)	14.5 (58.1)	15.6 (60.1)	17.3 (63.1)	18.5 (65.3)	19.2 (66.6)	18.5 (65.3)	17.5 (63.5)	15.0 (59.0)	12.9 (55.2)	15.6 (60.1)
Record low °C (°F)	4.9 (40.8)	6.0 (42.8)	7.7 (45.9)	8.7 (47.7)	11.4 (52.5)	12.5 (54.5)	15.5 (59.9)	15.8 (60.4)	14.5 (58.1)	10.6 (51.1)	7.7 (45.9)	7.5 (45.5)	4.9 (40.8)
Average precipitation mm (inches)	14.3 (0.56)	17.0 (0.67)	13.1 (0.52)	3.8 (0.15)	3.5 (0.14)	1.4 (0.06)	0.5 (0.02)	5.0 (0.20)	2.3 (0.09)	11.8 (0.46)	13.8 (0.54)	14.1 (0.56)	100.6 (3.96)
Average precipitation days (≥ 1.0 mm)	2.9	2.5	2.4	1.0	0.6	0.4	0.1	0.5	0.4	1.7	2.4	2.9	17.8
Source: NOAA, (February record high)

== See also ==
- Tan-Tan Moussem
- Xlinks Morocco-UK Power Project – Proposed electricity interconnector between Morocco and Great Britain
