= Sbouya =

Coordinates: 29°49′N 9°33′W

- Rural commune and town
- Interactive map of Sbouya
- Country: Morocco
- Region: Guelmim-Oued Noun
- Province: Sidi Ifni

Population (2004)
  - Total: 5,028
- Time zone: UTC+0 (GMT)

Sbouya is a small town and rural commune in Sidi Ifni Province of the Guelmim-Oued Noun region of Morocco. At the time of the 2004 census, the commune had a total population of 5028 people living in 806 households.
