= Sidi M'Bark =

Coordinates: 29.29867°N 9.825005°W

- Rural commune and town
- Interactive map of Sidi M'Bark
- Country: [[|]]
- Region: Guelmim-Oued Noun
- Province: Sidi Ifni

Population (2004)
  - Total: 9,876
- Time zone: UTC+0 (WET)
  - Summer (DST): UTC+1 (WEST)

Sidi M'Bark is a small town and rural commune in Sidi Ifni Province of the Guelmim-Oued Noun region of Morocco. At the time of the 2004 census, the commune had a total population of 6932 people living in 1166 households.
