= Boutrouch =

Coordinates: 29.33499°N 9.275495°W

- Rural commune and town
- Interactive map of Boutrouch
- Country: Morocco
- Region: Guelmim-Oued Noun
- Province: Sidi Ifni

Population (2004)
  - Total: 4,496
- Time zone: UTC+0 (GMT)

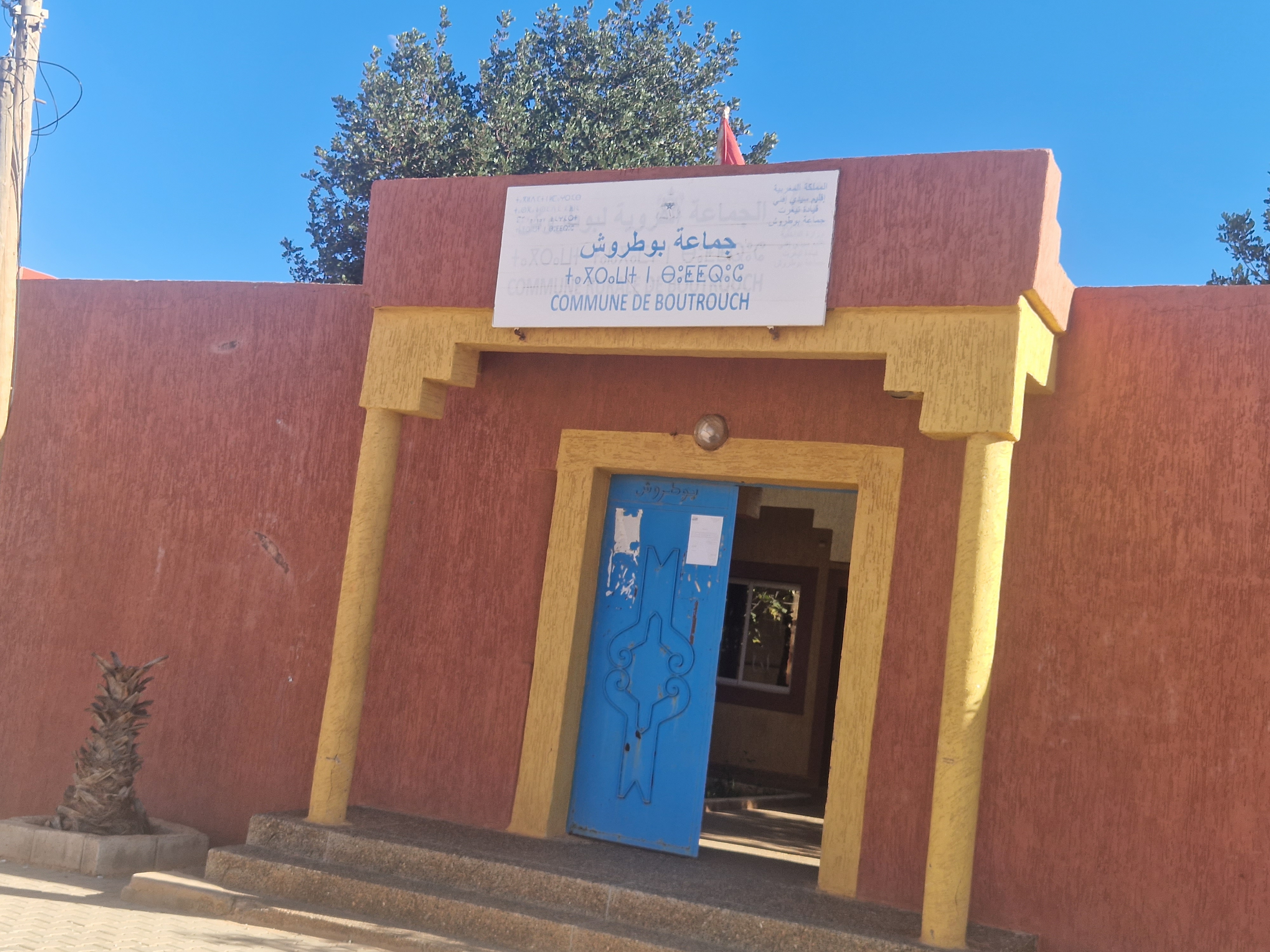
The main gate of Boutrouch commune

Boutrouch is a rural commune in Sidi Ifni Province of the Guelmim-Oued Noun region of Morocco. At the time of the 2004 census, the commune had a total population of 4496 people living in 714 households.

== Villages ==
- ID ALI OU AHMED
- AFRA
- IMAOUNE
- ID HMOU AADI
- ID AADI OU M'BAREK
- ID AHMED OU LHCEN
- ID ALI OU BLAID
- ID ALI OU AHMED
- ID BAHA OU SALEH
- ID BELLA OU BELLA
- ID BOUBKER
- ID BOUHYA
- ID BOUZMANE
- ID BRICHE
- ID HAMMOU AADI
- ID HASSI
- ID KAROUM
- ID LHAJ ALI
- ID LHCEN OU MASSOUD
- ID MBARK
- ID MHMED
- ID MIMOUNE
- ID MOUSSA
- ID SAID OUBERKA
- ID SIDI MBARK
- ID YAZZAL
- ID ZEDDOU
- IMACHIOUNE
- IMAOUNE
- IMRZGUELLI
- IZEROUALN
- OUAOUGCHRIR:ASSAKA
- RAGZA
- TAFRAOUTE IGRA
- TAGRIANTE
- TANNADINE
- TAOURIRT
- TIZAGHARINE
- TOURGHT
- TOUZOUMTE
- ANAMER
