= Mesti =

Mesti or Mestis may refer to:

- Imset, one of the sons of Horus, whose name is sometimes transcribed Mesti
- Mesti, Morocco a small village of the Guelmim-Oued Noun
- Mestis, a league of hockey in Finland
