= Chbika =

- Rural commune and town
- Interactive map of Chbika
- Coordinates: 28°28′44″N 11°20′52″W
- Country: Morocco
- Region: Guelmim-Oued Noun
- Province: Tan-Tan

Population (2004)
  - Total: 541
- Time zone: UTC+0 (GMT)

Chbika is a small coastal town and rural commune in Tan-Tan Province of the Guelmim-Oued Noun region of Morocco. It is located just to the south of the Port of Tan-Tan, west of the city. At the time of the 2004 census, the commune had a total population of 541 people living in 108 households.
