= Anfeg =

Coordinates: 29.421499°N 9.192015°W

- Rural commune and town
- Interactive map of Anfeg
- Country: Morocco
- Region: Guelmim-Oued Noun
- Province: Sidi Ifni

Population (2004)
  - Total: 8,093
- Time zone: UTC+0 (GMT)

Anfeg is a small town and rural commune in Sidi Ifni Province of the Guelmim-Oued Noun region of Morocco. At the time of the 2004 census, the commune had a total population of 8093 people living in 1428 households.
