= Abteh =

Coordinates: 27.897005°N 11.154395°W

- Rural commune and town
- Interactive map of Abteh
- Country: Morocco
- Region: Guelmim-Oued Noun
- Province: Tan-Tan

Population (2004)
  - Total: 390
- Time zone: UTC+0 (GMT)

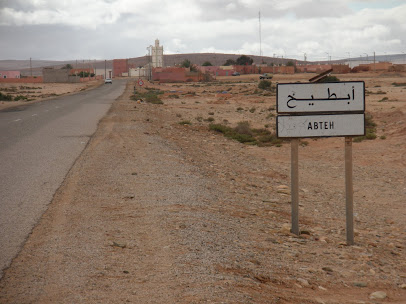
Arrival sign at Abteh, Morocco

Abteh is a small town and rural commune in Tan-Tan Province, Guelmim-Oued Noun, Morocco. At the time of the 2004 census, the commune had a total population of 390 people living in 75 households.
