= Msied =

Coordinates: 28°01′N 10°49′W

- Rural commune and town
- Interactive map of Msied
- Country: Morocco
- Region: Guelmim-Oued Noun
- Province: Tan-Tan Province

Population (2004)
  - Total: 1,023
- Time zone: UTC+0 (GMT)

Msied is a small town and rural commune in Tan-Tan Province, Guelmim-Oued Noun, Morocco. At the time of the 2004 census, the commune had a total population of 1023 people living in 189 households.
