= Mirleft =

Coordinates: 29.6081°N 9.9698°W

Mirleft ⵎⵉⵔⵍⵍⴼⵜ مير اللفت
- Rural commune and town
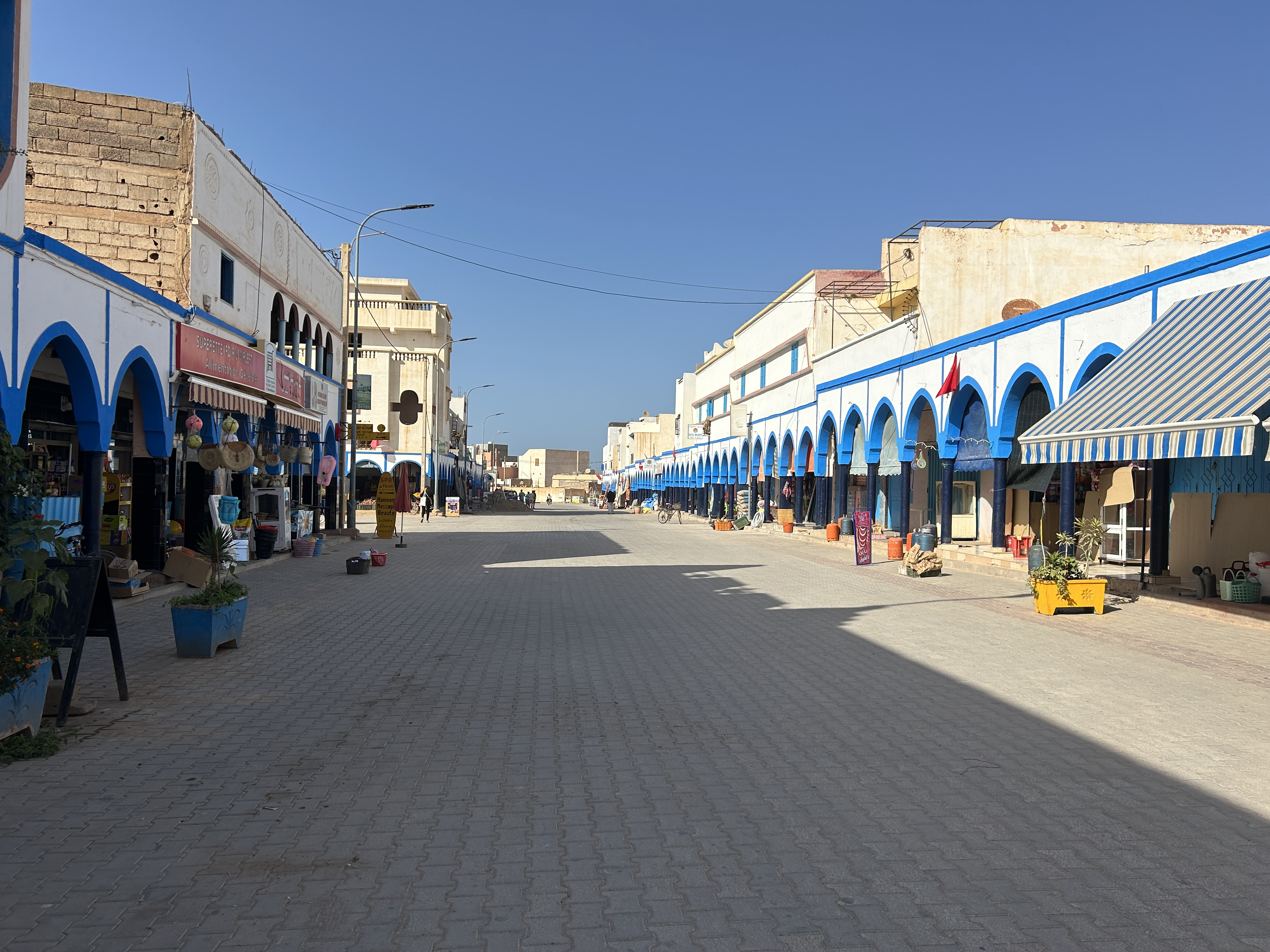
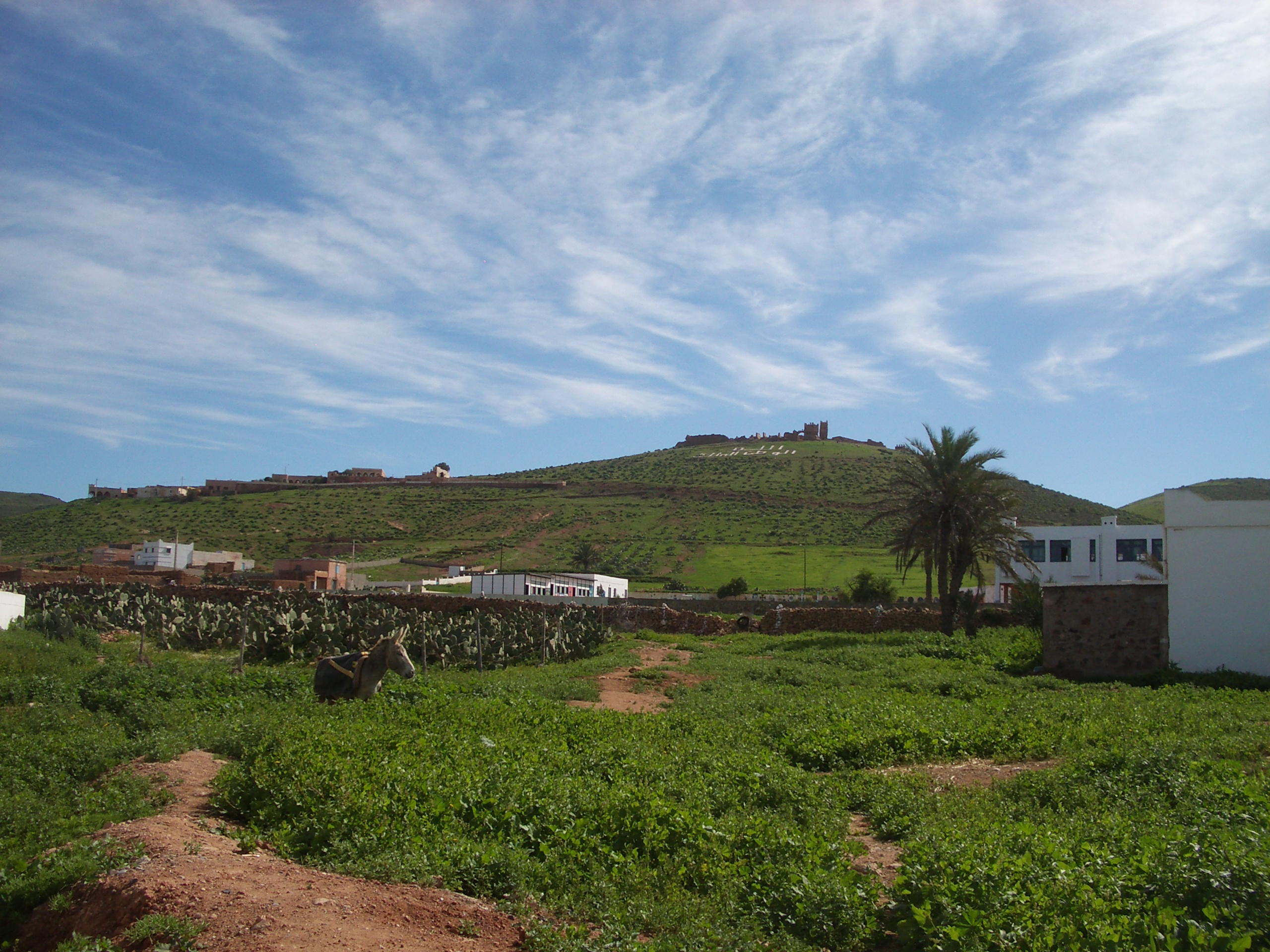
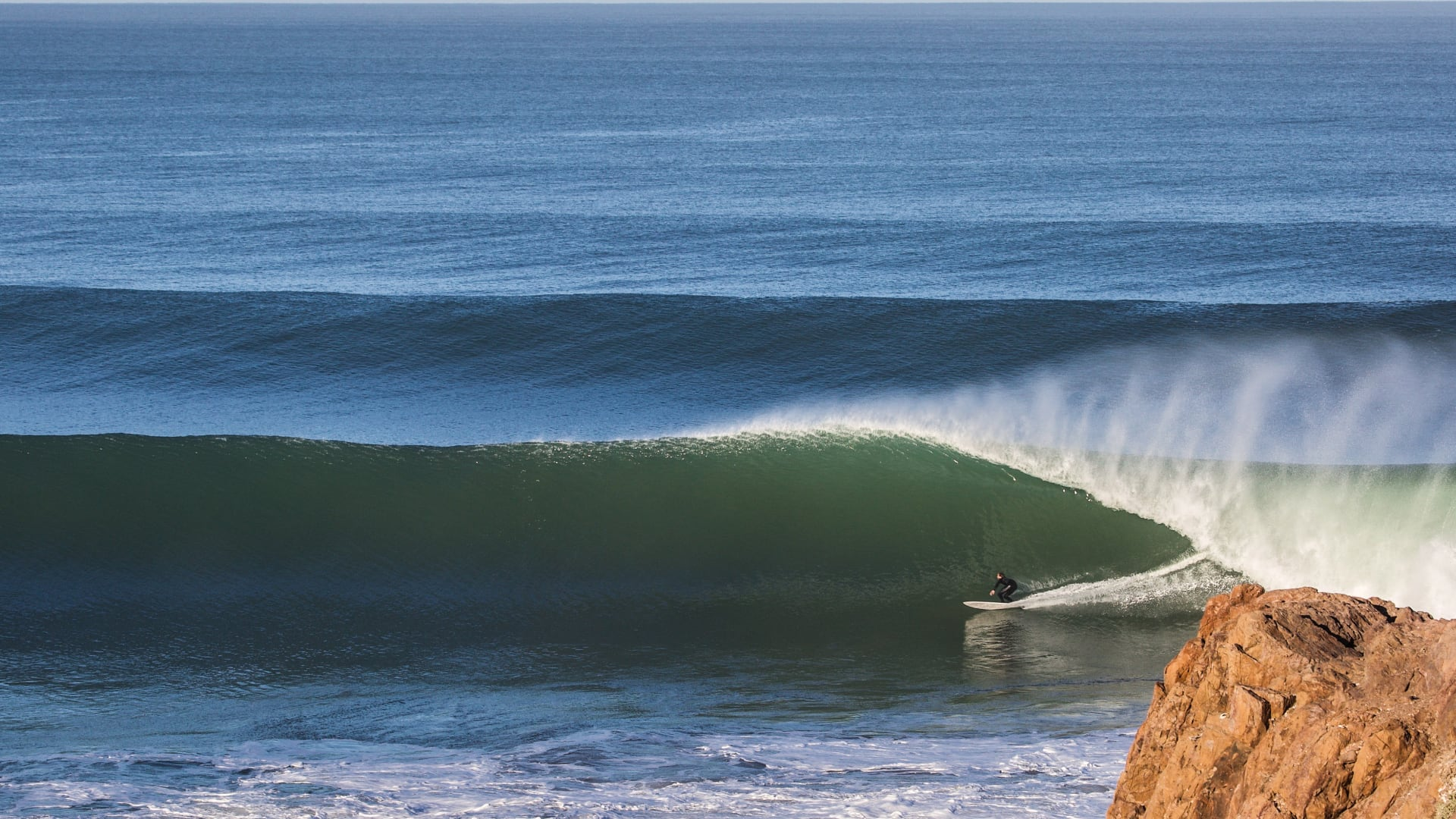
- Interactive map of Mirleft
- Country: Morocco
- Region: Guelmim-Oued Noun
- Province: Sidi Ifni

Population (2004)
  - Total: 7,026
- Time zone: UTC+0 (GMT)

Mirleft (Berber languages: ⵎⵉⵔⵍⵍⴼⵜ; Arabic: مير اللفت) is a small coastal town and rural commune in Sidi Ifni Province of the Guelmim-Oued Noun region of Morocco. At the 2004 census, the commune had a total population of 7026 people living in 1303 households.

== Description ==
Mirleft is perched on top of the gigantic ocher-colored cliffs bordering the Atlantic Ocean.

Fort Tidli, an abandoned military fort built in 1935, stretches along the ocean as well as the traditional town, where one can find various and varied local products such as argan oil, Moroccan pottery, and slippers.

Mirleft is known as a suitable spot for water sports (surfing, bodyboarding), thanks to its wind and regular rolls offering the ideal conditions for surfing, windsurfing and kitesurfing.

The waters of Mirleft are also known to be rich in variety and quantity of fish.

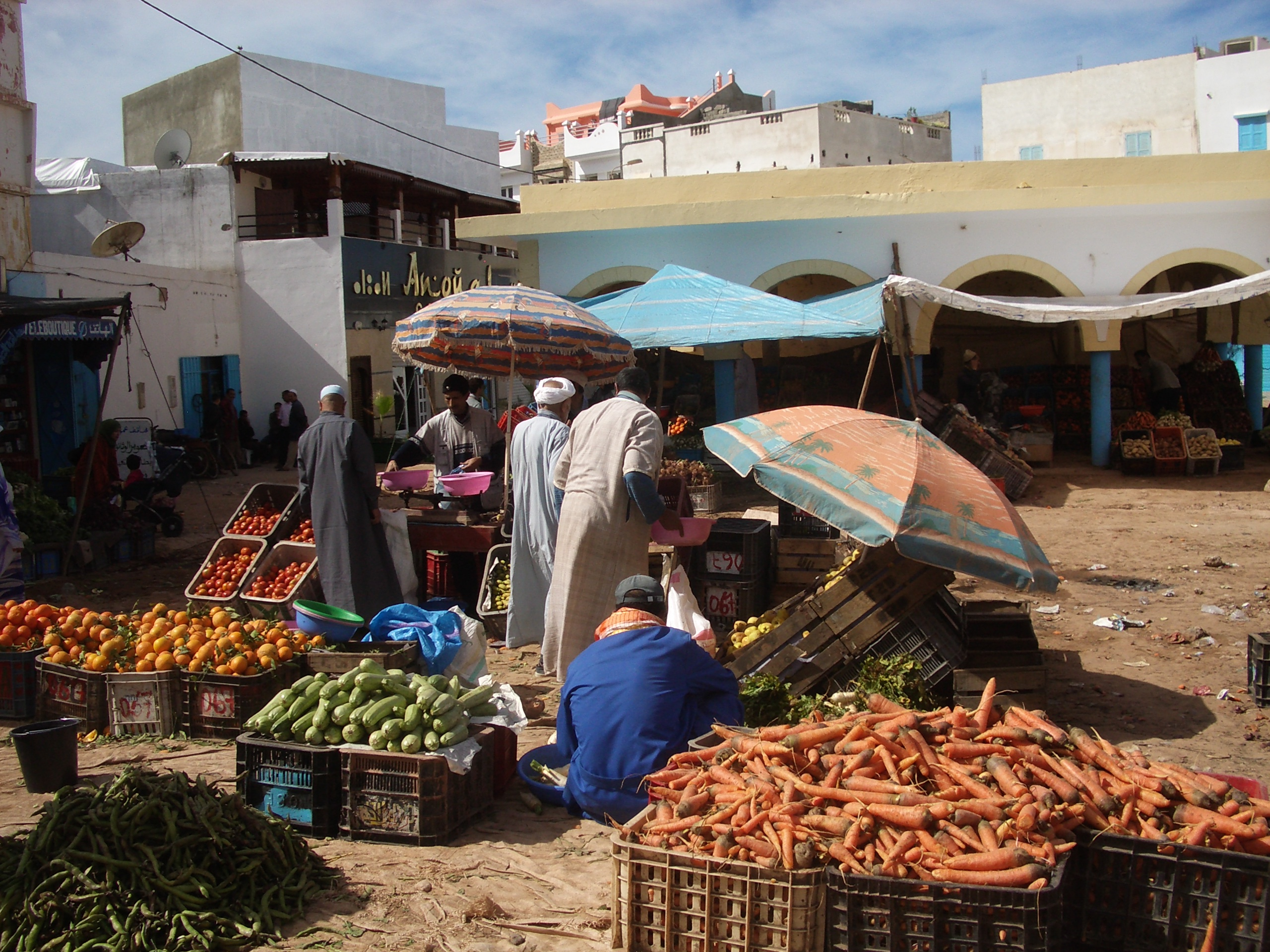
The market in Mirleft
