= Tnine Amellou =

Place in Guelmim-Oued Noun, Morocco

Coordinates: 29.29406°N 10.02573°W

- Rural commune and town
- Interactive map of Tnine Amellou
- Country: Morocco
- Region: Guelmim-Oued Noun
- Province: Sidi Ifni

Population (2004)
  - Total: 4,534
- Time zone: UTC+0 (GMT)

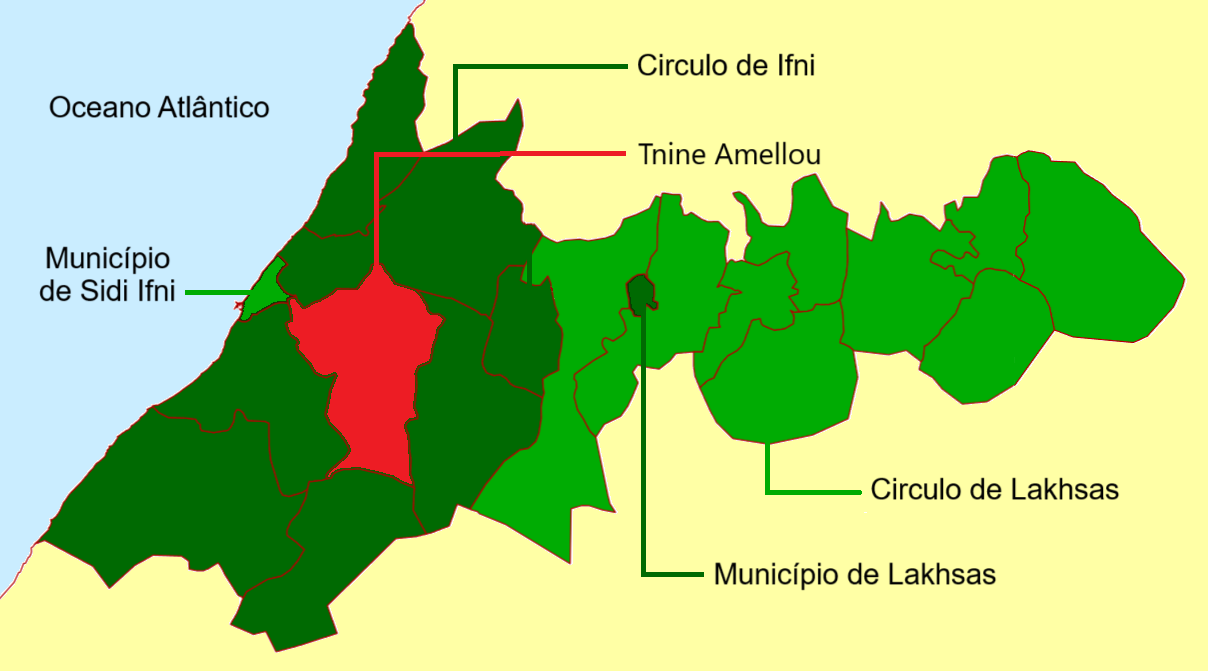
Location of Tnine Amellou in Sidi Ifni province

Tnine Amellou is a small town and rural commune in Sidi Ifni Province of the Guelmim-Oued Noun region of Morocco. At the time of the 2004 census, the commune had a total population of 4,534 people living in 709 households.
