= Sidi Abdallah Ou Belaid =

Coordinates: 29.271965°N 9.541965°W

- Rural commune and town
- Interactive map of Sidi Abdallah Ou Belaid
- Country: Morocco
- Region: Guelmim-Oued Noun
- Province: Sidi Ifni

Population (2004)
  - Total: 5,233
- Time zone: UTC+0 (GMT)

Sidi Abdallah Ou Belaid is a small town and rural commune in Sidi Ifni Province of the Guelmim-Oued Noun region of Morocco. At the time of the 2004 census, the commune had a total population of 5233 people living in 893 households.
