= Arbaa Ait Abdellah =

Coordinates: 29.390329°N 9.91429°W

- Rural commune and town
- Interactive map of Arbaa Ait Abdellah
- Country: Morocco
- Region: Guelmim-Oued Noun
- Province: Sidi Ifni

Population (2004)
  - Total: 3,921
- Time zone: UTC+0 (GMT)

Arbaa Ait Abdellah is a small town and rural commune in Sidi Ifni Province of the Guelmim-Oued Noun region of Morocco. At the time of the 2004 census, the commune had a total population of 3921 people living in 665 households.
