= Ait Erkha =

Coordinates: 29.337444°N 9.56082°W

Ait Erkha: أيت الرخا (Arabic); ⴰⵢⵜ ⵔⵅⴰ (Standard Moroccan Tamazight)
- Rural commune and town
- Interactive map of Ait Erkha
- Country: Morocco
- Region: Guelmim-Oued Noun
- Province: Sidi Ifni

Population (2004)
  - Total: 5,842
- Time zone: UTC+0 (GMT)

Ait Erkha is a small town and rural commune in Sidi Ifni Province of the Guelmim-Oued Noun region of Morocco. At the time of the 2004 census, the commune had a total population of 5842 people living in 949 households.
