= Tilemzoun =

Coordinates: 28.25226°N 11.049585°W

- Rural commune and town
- Interactive map of Tilemzoun
- Country: Morocco
- Region: Guelmim-Oued Noun
- Province: Tan-Tan

Population (2004)
  - Total: 771
- Time zone: UTC+0 (GMT)

Tilemzoun is a small town and rural commune in Tan-Tan Province, Guelmim-Oued Noun, Morocco. At the time of the 2004 census, the commune had a total population of 771 people living in 149 households.
