= Imi N'Fast =

Coordinates: 29.07761°N 10.10032°W

- Rural commune and town
- Interactive map of Imi N'Fast
- Country: Morocco
- Region: Guelmim-Oued Noun
- Province: Sidi Ifni

Population (2004)
  - Total: 2,781
- Time zone: UTC+0 (GMT)

Imi N'Fast (Arabic: إمي نفاست, ʔimī nfāst, [ʔimiː nafaːst]) is a small town and rural commune in the province of Sidi Ifni, Guelmim-Oued Noun region, Morocco. At the time of the 2004 census, the commune had a total population of 2781 people living in 412 households.
