= Tighirt =

Coordinates: 29.380951°N 9.44338°W

- Rural commune and town
- Interactive map of Tighirt
- Country: Morocco
- Region: Guelmim-Oued Noun
- Province: Sidi Ifni

Population (2004)
  - Total: 7,879
- Time zone: UTC+0 (GMT)

Tighirt is a small town and rural commune in Sidi Ifni Province of the Guelmim-Oued Noun region of Morocco. At the time of the 2004 census, the commune had a total population of 7879 people living in 1283 households.
