= Lakhsas =

Coordinates: 29.355833°N 9.755278°W

Lakhsas لَخْصـَــاصْ / ⵍⴰⵅⵚⴰⵚ
- Town
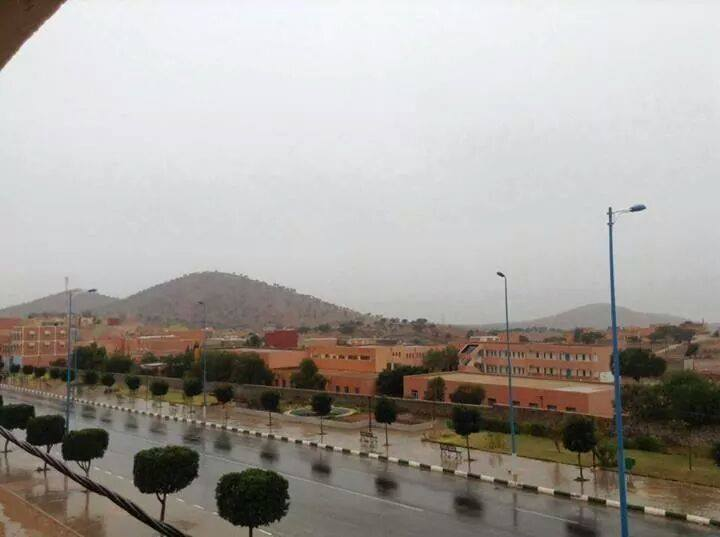
- Interactive map of Lakhsas
- Country: Morocco
- Region: Souss-Massa
- Province: Sidi Ifni

Population (2004)
  - Total: 4,194
- Time zone: UTC+0 (GMT)

Lakhsas is a town in Sidi Ifni Province, Guelmim-Oued Noun, Morocco. According to the 2004 census it had a population of 4194. It is known for Argan oil as other towns and cities in the region. Lakhssas is located on the first national road that lead to the south of the country.
