= Sidi H'Saine Ou Ali =

Coordinates: 29.34881°N 9.684855°W

- Rural commune and town
- Interactive map of Sidi H'Saine Ou Ali
- Country: Morocco
- Region: Guelmim-Oued Noun
- Province: Sidi Ifni

Population (2004)
  - Total: 6,960
- Time zone: UTC+0 (GMT)

Sidi H'Saine Ou Ali is a small town and rural commune in Sidi Ifni Province of the Guelmim-Oued Noun region of Morocco. At the time of the 2004 census, the commune had a total population of 6960 people living in 1262 households.
