= Ibdar =

Coordinates: 29.453356°N 9.315445°W

- Rural commune and town
- Interactive map of Ibdar
- Country: Morocco
- Region: Guelmim-Oued Noun
- Province: Sidi Ifni

Population (2004)
  - Total: 5,194
- Time zone: UTC+0 (GMT)

Ibdar is a small town and rural commune in Sidi Ifni Province of the Guelmim-Oued Noun region of Morocco. At the time of the 2004 census, the commune had a total population of 5,194 people living in 898 households.
