= Sidi Ifni Province =

Coordinates: 29°23′N 10°10′W

Sidi Ifni Province إقليم سيدي إفني ⵜⴰⵙⴳⴰ ⵏ ⵙⵉⴷⵉ ⵉⴼⵏⵉ
- Province
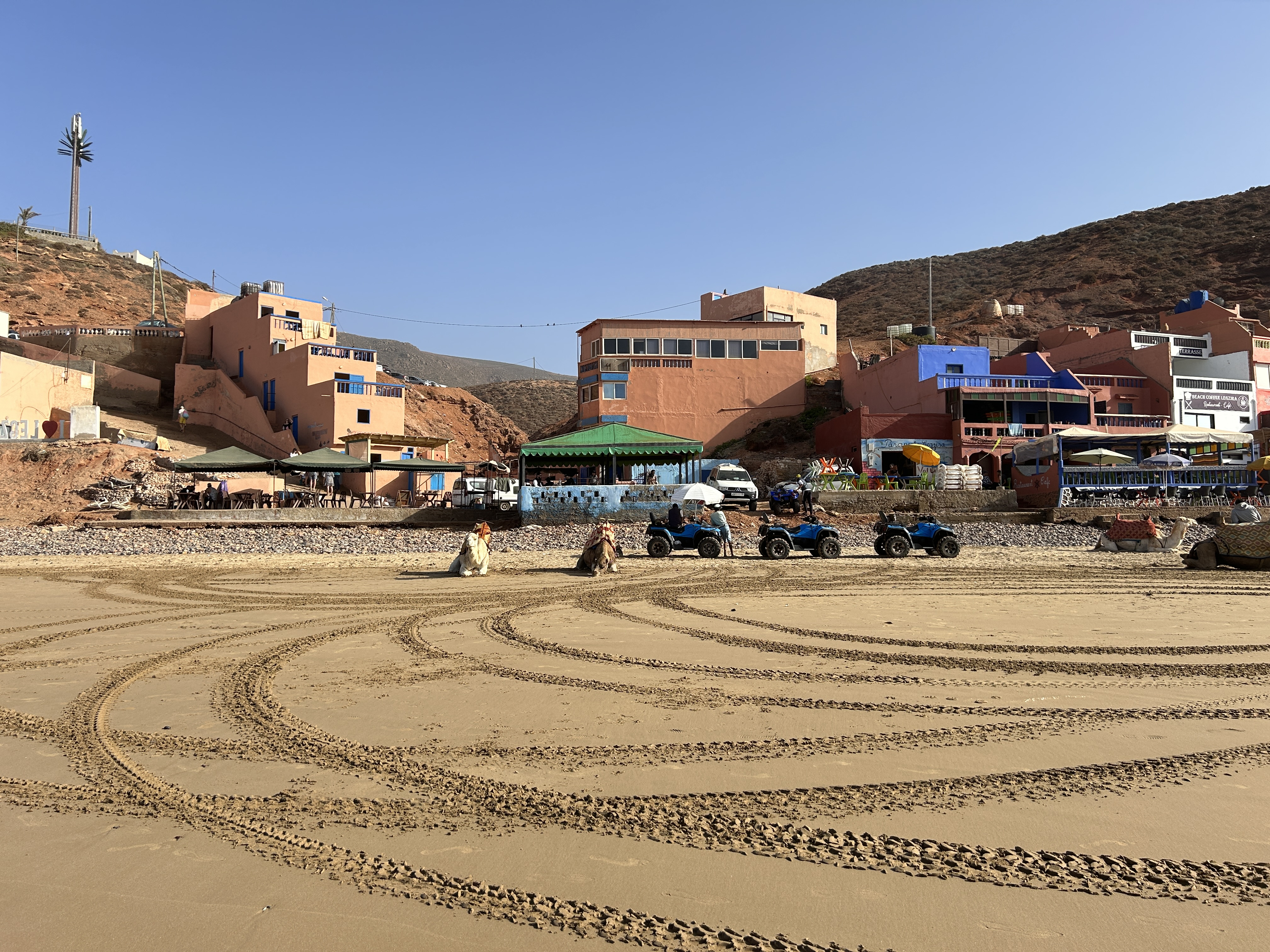
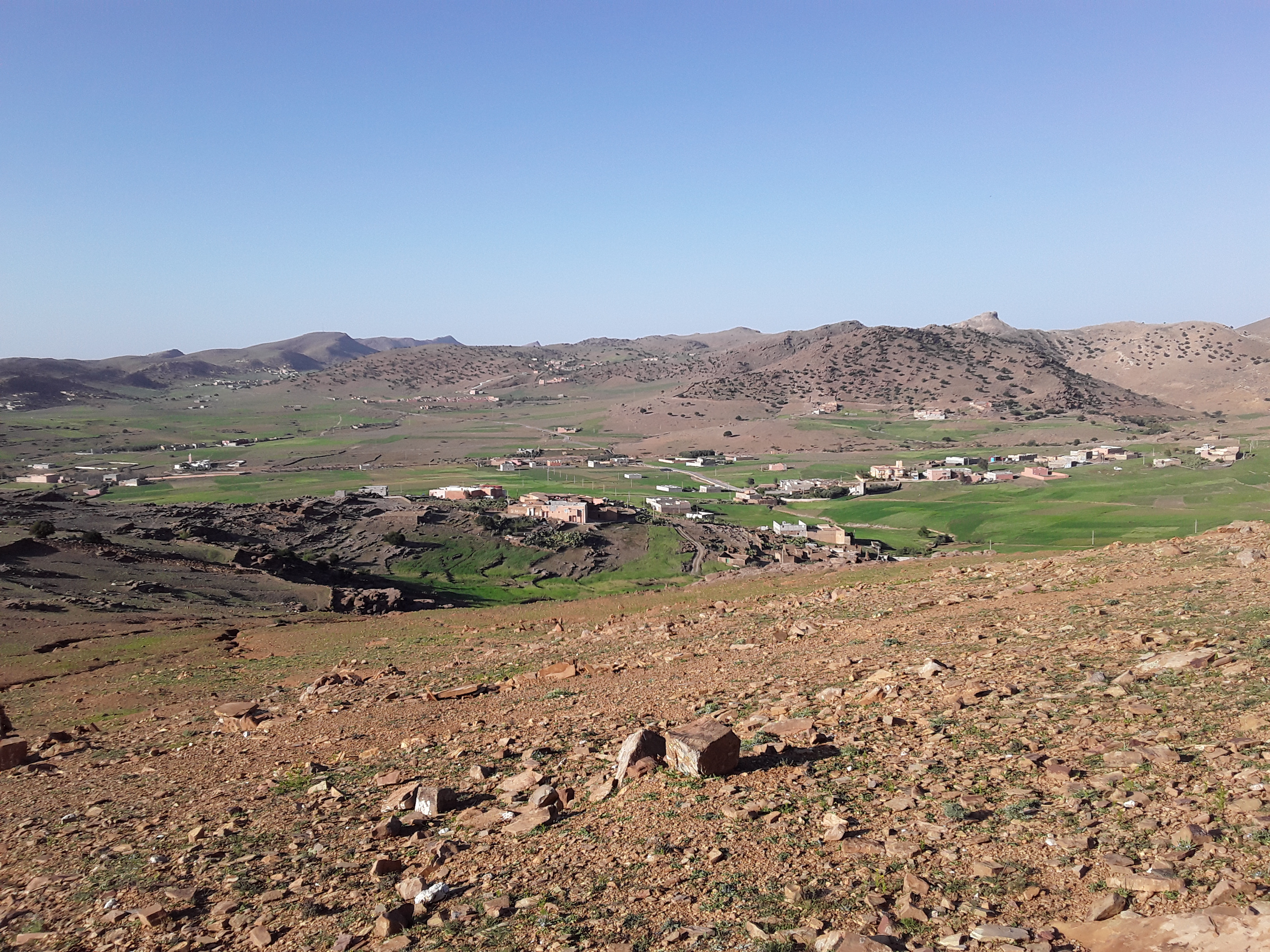
- Camels and Quads at Legzira Beach Shrine of Sidi Mohamed Ou Lahcen, Lakhsas Anti Atlas, Ait Erkha
- Interactive map of Sidi Ifni Province
- Country: Morocco
- Region: Guelmim-Oued Noun
- Seat: Sidi Ifni

Population (2024)
  - Total: 104,601

Sidi Ifni (Arabic: سيدي إفني; Standard Moroccan Tamazight: ⵙⵉⴷⵉ ⵉⴼⵏⵉ) is a province in the Moroccan region of Guelmim-Oued Noun. It was created in 2009 from the southern part of Tiznit Province, and recorded a population of 104,601 in the 2024 Moroccan census., the capital is Sidi Ifni.

Until 1969, most of its territory was part of the Spanish Territorio de Ifni.

The major cities and towns are:

- Sidi Ifni
- Mirleft
- Lakhsas

== Administrative divisions ==
Communes of Sidi Ifni Province

The province is divided into the following municipalities and communes:

=== Rural communes ===
Name	Geographic code	Households (2024)	Population (2024)
Ait Erkha	473.07.01.	1166	4490
Anfeg	473.07.03.	1220	3803
Arbaa Ait Abdellah	473.05.01.	679	2671
Boutrouch	473.07.05.	734	2693
Ibdar	473.07.07.	978	3323
Imi N'Fast	473.05.03.	449	1962
Mesti	473.05.05.	731	2533
Sbouya	473.05.09.	703	2772
Sebt Ennabour	473.07.09.	1512	6047
Sidi Abdallah Ou Belaid	473.07.11.	938	3524
Sidi H'Saine Ou Ali	473.07.13.	1321	4769
Sidi M'Bark	473.07.15.	1324	4898
Tangarfa	473.05.11.	1021	3895
Tighirt	473.07.17.	1614	5840
Tioughza	473.05.13.	2690	10007
Tnine Amellou	473.05.15.	831	3247

=== Municipalities ===
Name	Geographic code	Households (2024)	Population (2024)	Notes
Lakhsas	473.01.01.	1474	5603	
Mirleft	473.01.07.	2767	9828	Urban centre: Mirleft (7,257 inhabitants; 2,096 households)
Sidi Ifni	473.01.03.	6387	22696	
