= El Ouatia =

Coordinates: 28.496241°N 11.33268°W

El Ouatia: الوطية (Arabic); ⵍⵡⴰⵟⵢⴰ (Standard Moroccan Tamazight); Tan-Tan Plage
- Municipality and town
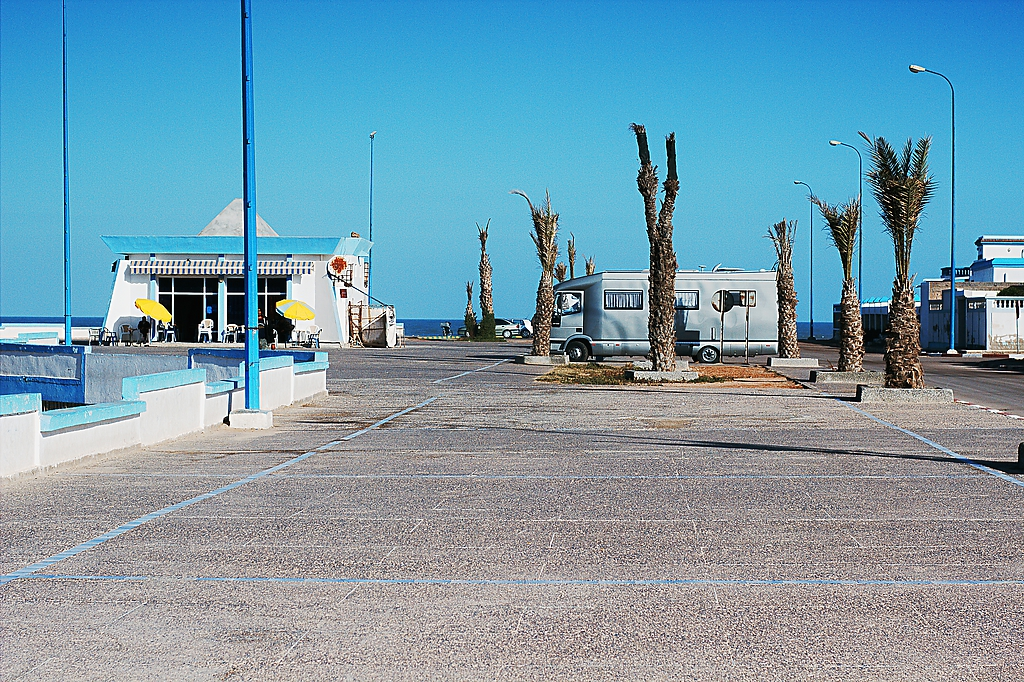
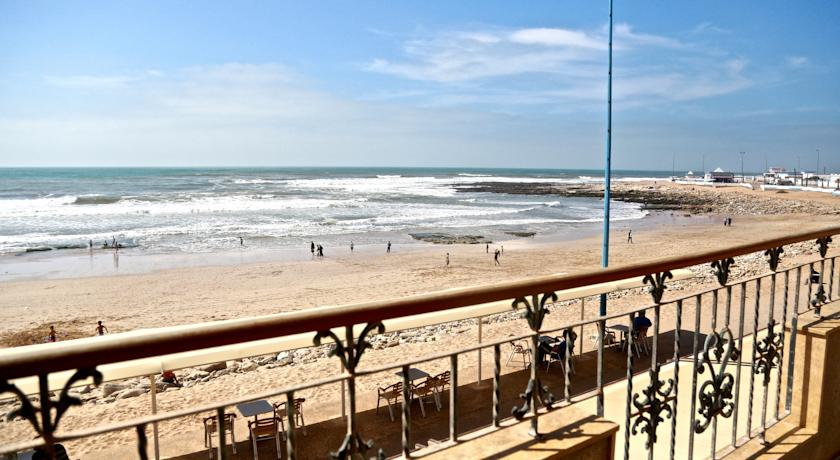
- Interactive map of El Ouatia
- Country: Morocco
- Region: Guelmim-Oued Noun
- Province: Tan-Tan Province

Population (2024)
  - Total: 14,258
- Time zone: UTC+0 (GMT)

El Ouatia, also known as Tan-Tan Plage (Tan-Tan Beach), is a town and municipality in Tan-Tan Province, Guelmim-Oued Noun region of Morocco. It is located about 25 km (15.5 mi) away from the city of Tan-Tan, and lies along the N1 Highway. At the time of the 2004 census, the commune had a total population of 6407 people living in 1592 households. It is one of Morocco's major fishing ports.
