= Tan-Tan Province =

Province in Guelmim-Oued Noun, Morocco

Coordinates: 28°26′N 10°06′W

Tan-Tan Province إقليم طانطان ⵜⴰⵙⴳⴰ ⵏ ⵟⴰⵏⵟⴰⵏ
- Province
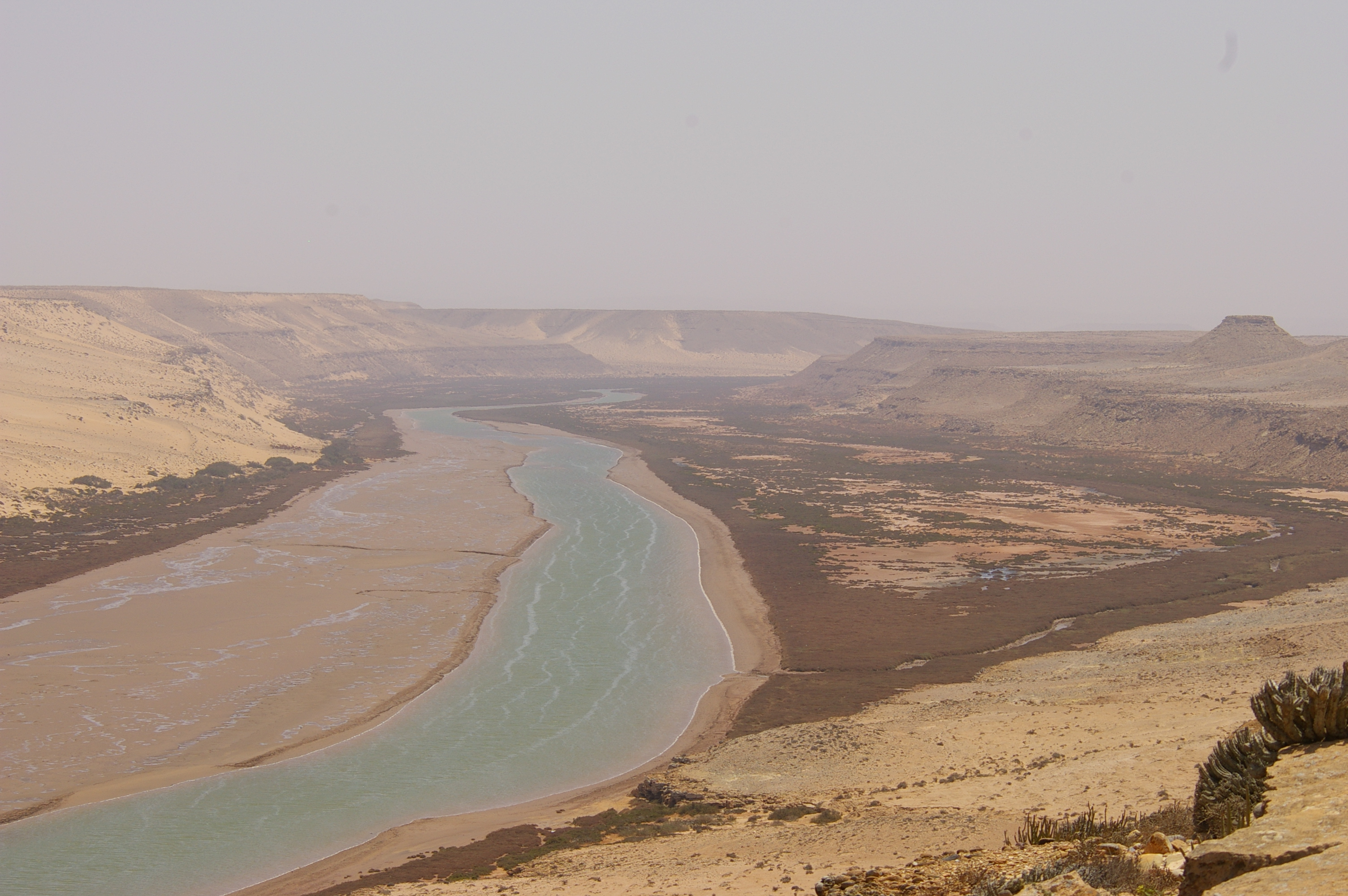
- The Draa river close to its mouth
- Interactive map of Tan-Tan Province
- Country: Morocco
- Region: Guelmim-Oued Noun
- Seat: Tan-Tan

Population (2024)
  - Total: 94,519

Tan-Tan Province (Arabic: إقليم طانطان, romanized: iqlīm ṭānṭān; Standard Moroccan Tamazight: ⵜⴰⵙⴳⴰ ⵏ ⵟⴰⵏⵟⴰⵏ, romanized: tasga n ṭanṭan) is a province in the Moroccan region of Guelmim-Oued Noun. Its population in 2024 was 94,519.

The major cities and towns are:

- El Ouatia
- Tan-Tan

== Subdivisions ==
The province is divided administratively into the following:

Name	Geographic code	Type	Households	Population (2004)	Foreign population	Moroccan population	Notes
Tan-Tan	521.01.01.	Municipality	12832	60698	8	60690	
El Ouatia	521.01.03.	Municipality	1592	6407	13	6394	
Msied	521.03.01.	Rural commune	189	1023	0	1023	
Tilemzoun	521.03.03.	Rural commune	149	771	0	771	
Abteh	521.05.01.	Rural commune	75	390	0	390	
Ben Khlil	521.05.03.	Rural commune	66	316	0	316	
Chbika	521.05.05.	Rural commune	108	541	1	540	
