= Mbarka Bouaida =

Moroccan politician

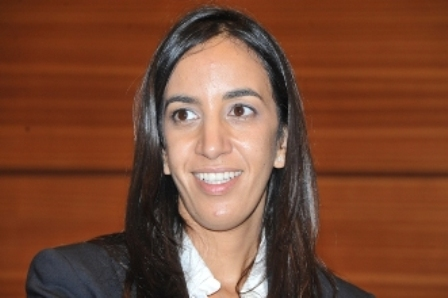
Mbarka Bouaida

Mbarka Bouaida (born 1975) is a Moroccan politician who served as Minister-Delegate of Foreign Affairs and Cooperation in the Benkirane government. In July 2019, she was elected president of the southeast region Guelmim-Oued Noun, the first woman elected as a Moroccan regional leader.

== Early life and education ==
Bouaida was born in 1975 in Laqssabi near Guelmim. She is of Sahrawi origin, of the Aït Lahcen tribe, part of the Tekna confederation.

Bouaida has a degree from the Graduate School of Management in Casablanca, and MBA from the University of Hull and a Masters in Communication from the University of Toulouse.

== Career ==
Bouaida was Director of Audit and Management Control for the Petrom Group from 2003.

Bouaida is a member of the National Rally of Independents and was elected under the women's quota to the House of Representatives to represent Anfa in 2007, making her the parliament's youngest member. She chaired the Committee of Foreign Affairs and the National Defence and Religious Affairs and was in charge of relations between the Moroccan and European Parliaments. In June 2009, she was also elected to the city council of Greater Casablanca.

Bouaida was elected to a second parliamentary term outside the women's quota in 2010. She was appointed Minister-Delegate for Foreign Affairs by King Mohammed VI on 10 October 2013. From 2017, she served as Secretary of State to the Minister of Agriculture and Fisheries.

Bouaida has been vice-president of the International Parliamentarian Forum for Democracy since September 2011 and is a Member of the North-South Centre of the Council of Europe. She is also the General Secretary of the Moustaqbal Association for Education. She was named "Young Global Leader" by the World Economic Forum in 2012. She also represents Morocco in the Euro-Mediterranean Parliamentary Assembly. In 2015, she led Morocco's delegation to the White House Summit on Countering Extreme Violence led by Joe Biden.

On 5 July 2019, Bouaida was elected regional leader of Guelmim-Oued Noun, the first woman in the country elected as a regional leader.
