= Sidi Ifni =

Sidi Ifni سيدي إفني ⵙⵉⴷⵉ ⵉⴼⵏⵉ Ifni
- City
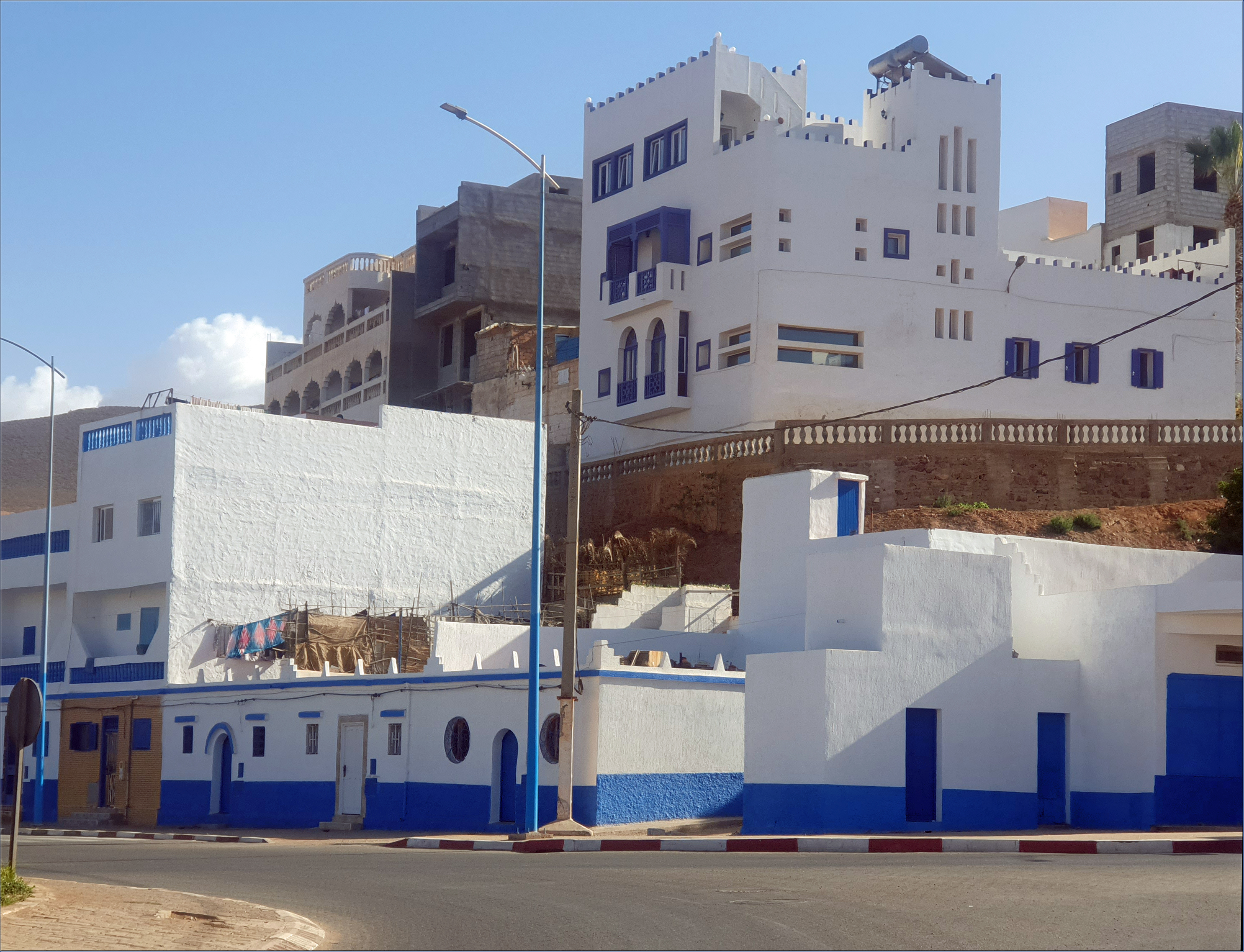
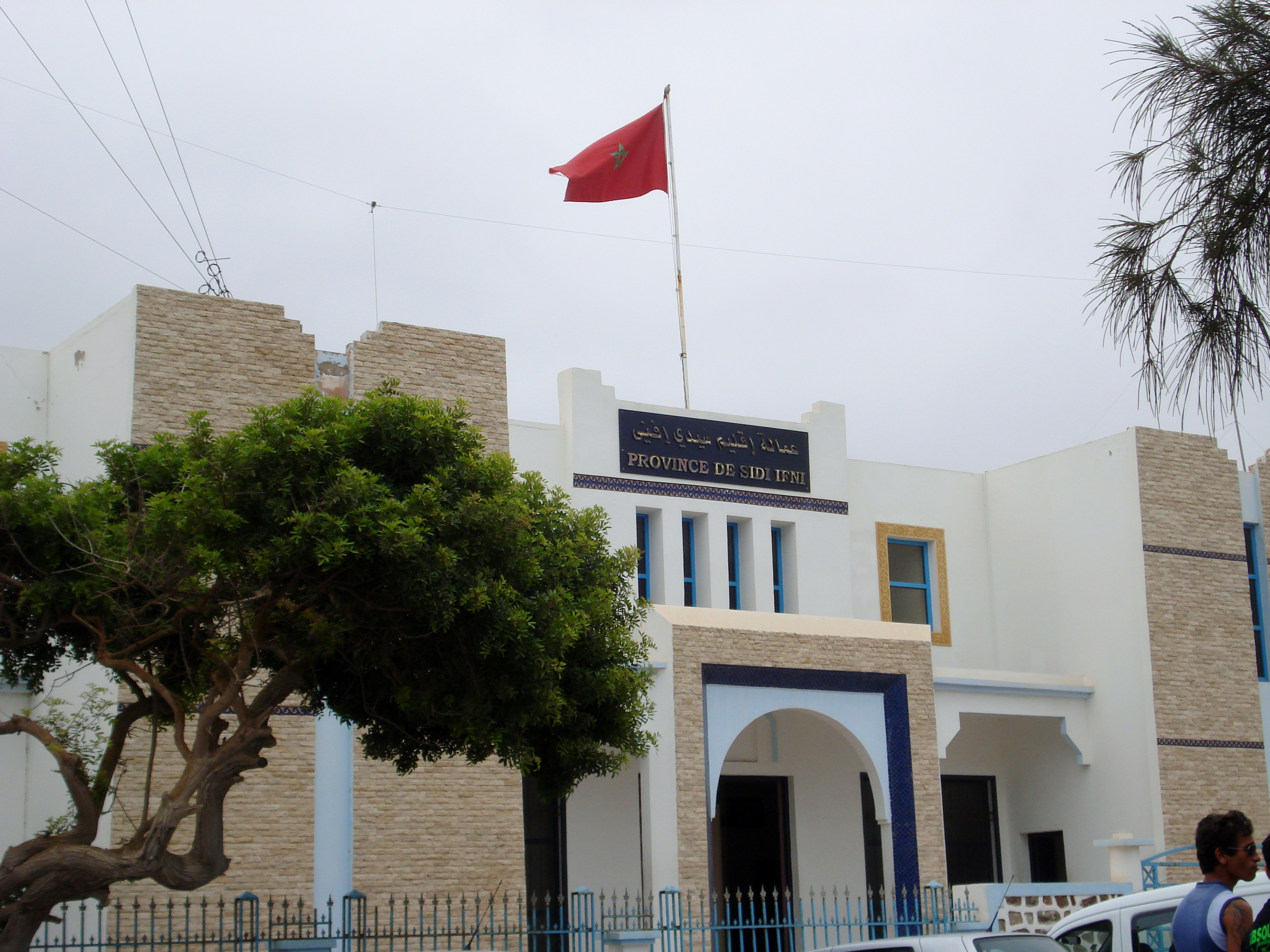
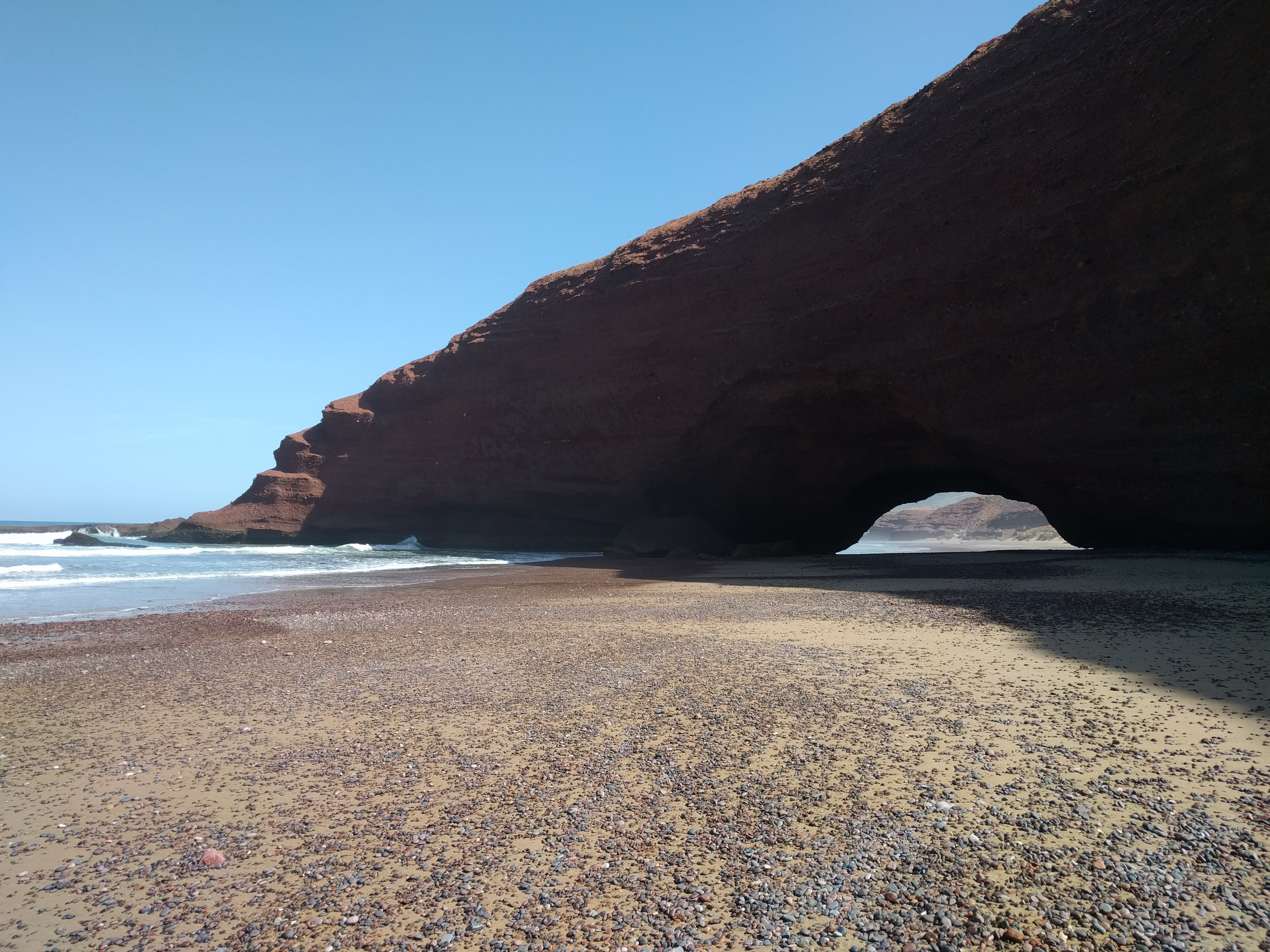
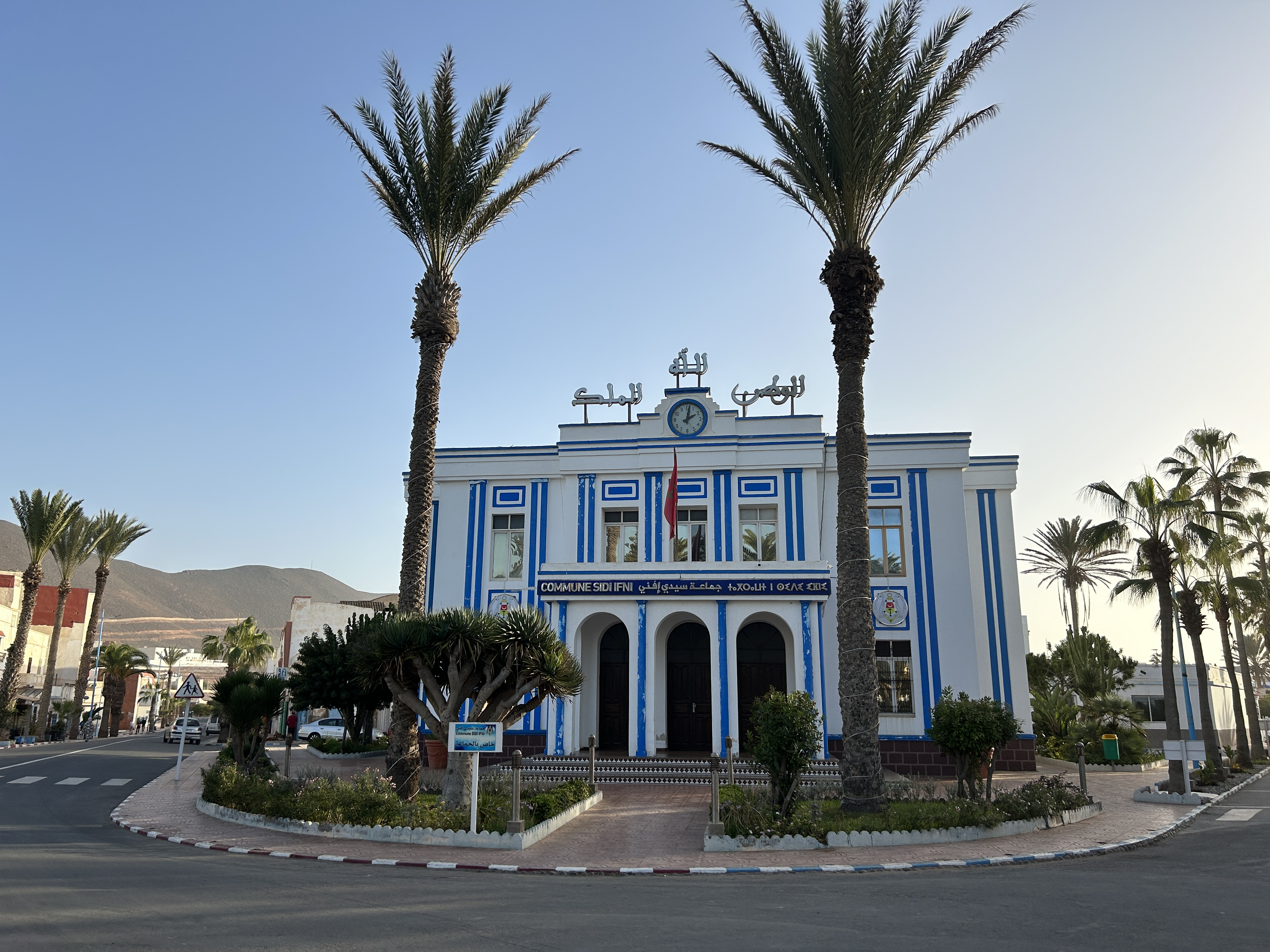
- Interactive map of Sidi Ifni
- Coordinates: 29°23′N 10°10′W
- Country: Morocco
- Region: Guelmim-Oued Noun
- Province: Sidi Ifni Province
- City: Sidi Ifni
- Elevation (seacoast settlement): 0 m (0 ft)

Population (2004)
  - Total: 20,051
- Demonym(s): ifneño, -ña
- Time zone: UTC+0 (GMT)
- Postal code: 85200

Sidi Ifni (Berber: Ifni, ⵉⴼⵏⵉ, Arabic: سيدي إفني) is a city located on the west coast of Morocco, on the shores of the Atlantic Ocean, with a population of 20,051 people. The economic base of the city is fishing. It was once a key enclave in Spain's Saharan territory.

It is located in Guelmim-Oued Noun region and serves as capital of Sidi Ifni Province.

Its inhabitants are Shilha from the Aït Baâmrane tribe. In 2000, an important fishing port was completed, which serves as a base for fish exports.

== History ==
The Aït Baâmrane tribe have long inhabited the small town and the surrounding region. The people worked in husbandry and traded with Europeans and northern Morocco, being intermediaries in the trans-Saharan trade.

In 1476, an enclave in the region of present-day Sidi Ifni was occupied by forces from the Spanish peninsula, which named its settlement there Santa Cruz de la Mar Pequeña. It remained in Spanish hands until 1524 when it was captured by forces of the Saadi Sultanate.

Historically, Sidi Ifni is claimed to be the location of Santa Cruz de la Mar Pequeña, which had been long pursued by Spain, who built a small coastal fortress there in the 15th century. Although the existence of the fortress is widely documented, historians could not determine its exact location along the coast between Agadir and Tarfaya. In 1860, following the Spanish-Moroccan War, Morocco ceded Sidi Ifni and the territory of Ifni to Spain as a part of the Treaty of Tangiers. During the period often termed the "Scramble for Africa", in 1884 Spain acquired what is now Western Sahara. Spain occupied Sidi Ifni and Western Sahara jointly, although the latter was known at the time as Spanish Sahara, Río de Oro or Saguia el-Hamra.

Until 1952, the Ifni region had the status of a protectorate. In that year, the region became part of Spanish West Africa, an entity that combined the colonies of Spanish Sahara and Cape Juby, with its capital located in Villa Bens; now called Tarfaya and currently in Morocco.

When Morocco obtained its independence from France, and then Spain, in 1956, it claimed the territory several times. The first was in August 1957, by stating that the French-Spanish treaty from 1912 had been abrogated. By late 1957 serious incidents had occurred at the border, starting the Ifni War, where Ifni garrisons were attacked by irregular troops led by Moroccan nationalists of the Istiqlal party, supported tacitly by the king. They called themselves the Moroccan Liberation Army.

The Spanish Army retreated from most territory with the purpose of establishing a defensive line limited to Sidi Ifni and its surroundings, while the Moroccan Liberation Army took control of the abandoned territory. The war was never formally declared nor finished, but on 1 April 1958, Spain and Morocco signed the Agreements of Angra de Cintra, by which Cape Juby was ceded to Morocco in June 1958. The lost territories of Ifni region were never regained by Spain, but were integrated into Morocco. Once the defensive line at Sidi Ifni was settled, the city remained under Spanish rule as a province of Spain, comparable to the Spanish enclave cities, Ceuta and Melilla, on the northern coast of Morocco.

In 1969, under international pressure, Spain relinquished Sidi Ifni to Morocco.

== Ifni protests ==
In June 2008 there were violent protests in Sidi Ifni. Media reports first cited eight protesters killed by police force, but this claim was later not substantiated.

On 30 May, dozens of unemployed workers had begun blocking the port to protest against not having been employed there. Unloading of fish was hindered. The following day, barriers were erected around the port. Several mediation efforts with local officials gave no result. On 6 June, around 500–600 people protested in the town and, moved by rumours that a police force from Tiznit or Agadir was to arrive, in the early hours of 7 June the protesters blocked several entrances to the town. A local official was severely harassed by the protesters. At 06:30 a police force composed of some 8,000 agents entered the city, dispersed the protesters employing rubber bullets and reopened the port. Many protesters fled to the surrounding mountains. The police then entered houses in the neighbourhoods of Boulaalame and Lalla Meryem and started to arrest people violently. Abuse, harassment and theft took place. Around 182 people were detained and all but 10 were freed later that day. Twelve cases of torture leading to up to 30 days of temporal incapacity and around 35 cases of aggression or harassment were proven by the Moroccan Human Rights organisation OMDH.

On 7 June the Qatar-owned TV chain Al Jazeera stated that eight to ten people had been killed during the police intervention. Amnesty International in 2009 reported "They [the Moroccan police] also conducted unauthorized raids on homes, confiscated property, verbally and sexually harassed people, and carried out arbitrary arrests and detentions." The relations between the Moroccan government and Al Jazeera seriously deteriorated and in July, Brahim Sbaalil, a spokesperson for the Islamist-leaning Centre Marocain des Droits Humain (CMDH) that had echoed the claims, was condemned to six months in prison for "spreading false accusations".

== Unique sea cable car system ==
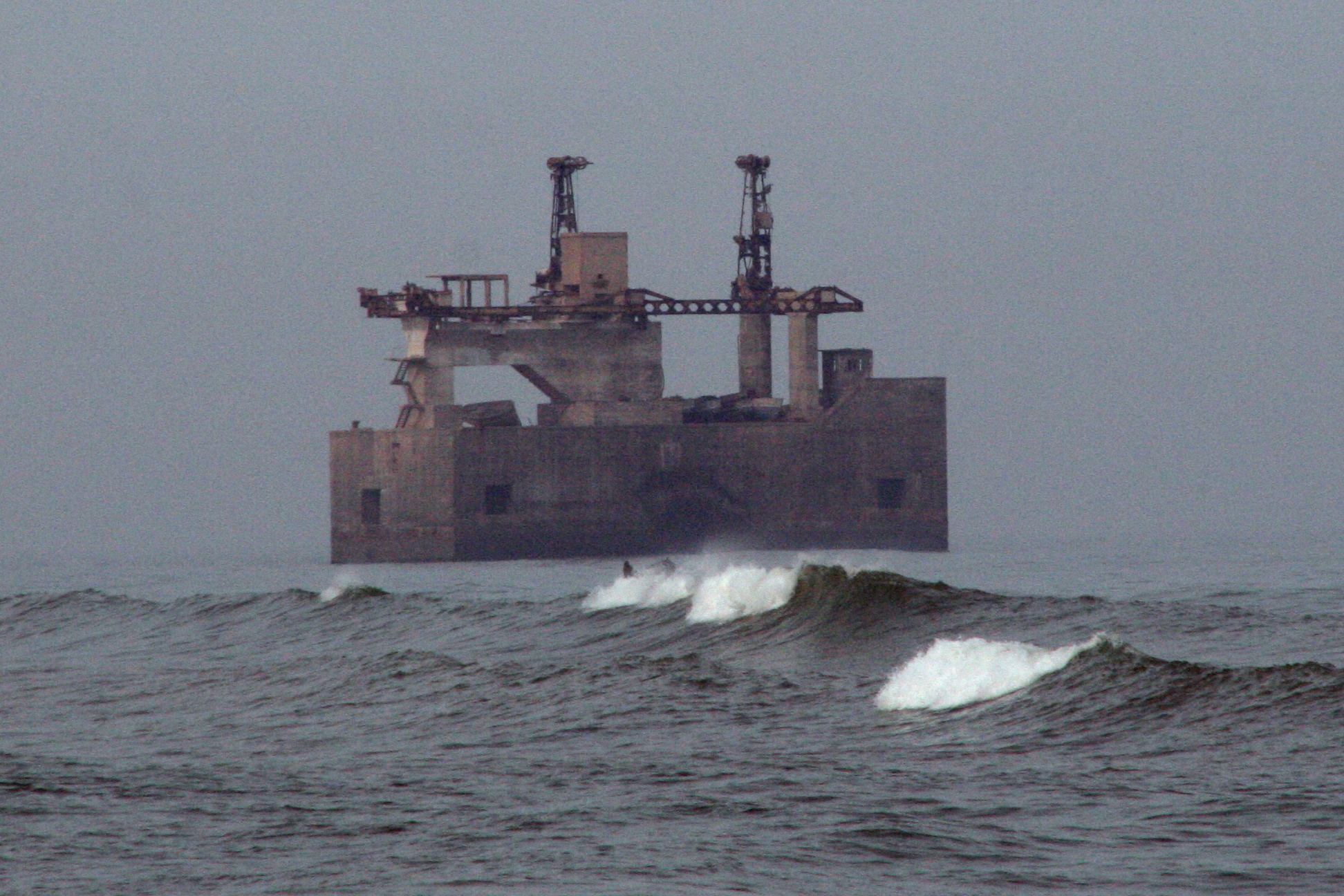
Remains of the offshore cable car end station

To better utilise its ocean-shipping potential, Spanish authorities in the 1960s conceived and installed a unique ship-offloading system in the shallow waters of the Sidi Ifni port. Since the waters were too shallow to allow ships to reach shore, a concrete bastion was built at 550 metres offshore. It held a derrick and crane. Cargo and personnel were lifted from a ship, then moved to another station near the cliffs east of town, using self-propelled carts slung from large steel cables. The cables were supported by several pylons. This system operated for a few years (until Spain finally ceded the territory to Morocco), then fell into disrepair. The cables have disappeared, but the end stations and pylons are still visible.

== Climate ==
Influenced by the cold Canary Current, Sidi Ifni has a hot desert climate (Köppen BWh) with mild to warm weather all year round, and very slight, erratic rainfall. This rain falls only during the winter months from November to April, and generally is significant only when the North Atlantic Oscillation is negative and drives the winter frontal storms (that normally remain well north of central Morocco) into the region.

Climate data for Sidi Ifni
Month	Jan	Feb	Mar	Apr	May	Jun	Jul	Aug	Sep	Oct	Nov	Dec	Year
Mean daily maximum °C (°F)	19 (66)	19 (67)	21 (69)	22 (71)	22 (71)	22 (72)	24 (75)	24 (75)	24 (75)	24 (75)	23 (74)	21 (69)	22 (72)
Mean daily minimum °C (°F)	11 (52)	12 (54)	14 (57)	15 (59)	16 (60)	17 (62)	18 (64)	18 (64)	18 (64)	17 (62)	16 (60)	13 (56)	16 (60)
Average rainfall cm (inches)	2.5 (1)	2.3 (0.9)	1.3 (0.5)	1.5 (0.6)	0.25 (0.1)	0.51 (0.2)	0 (0)	0 (0)	0.76 (0.3)	0.76 (0.3)	2.0 (0.8)	4.1 (1.6)	15.98 (6.3)
Source: Weatherbase

== Gallery ==
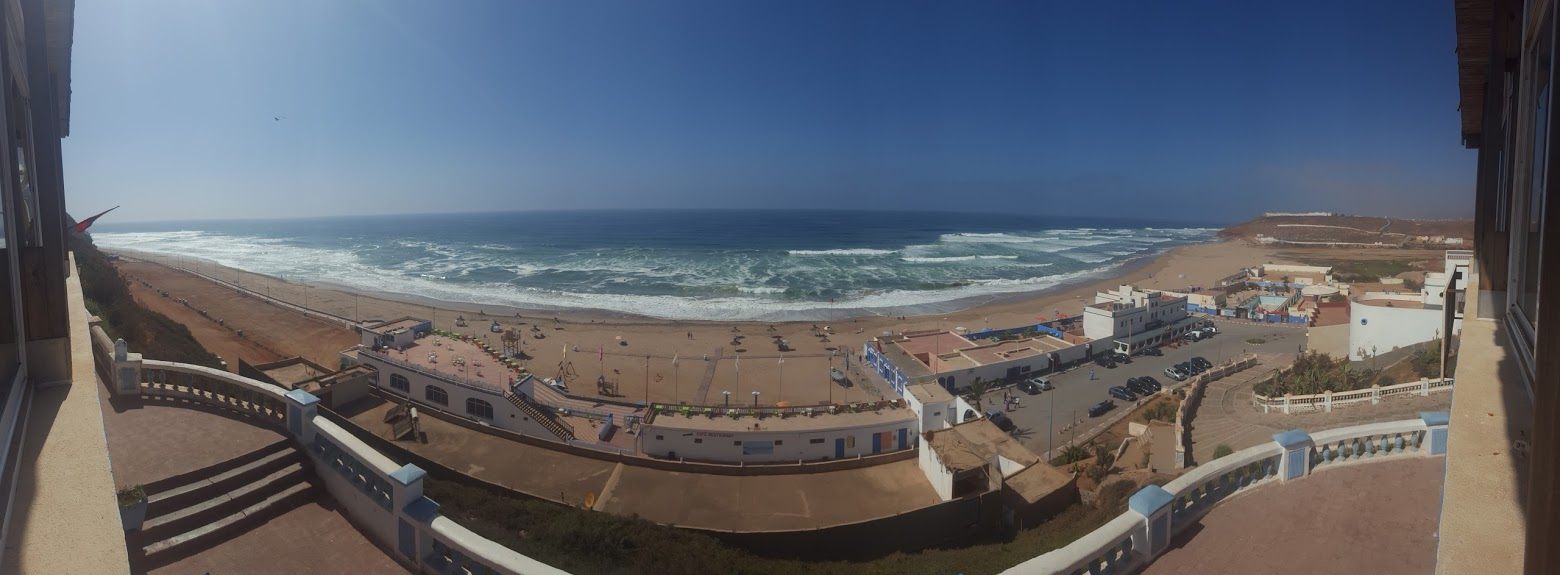
Panoramic view of the beach
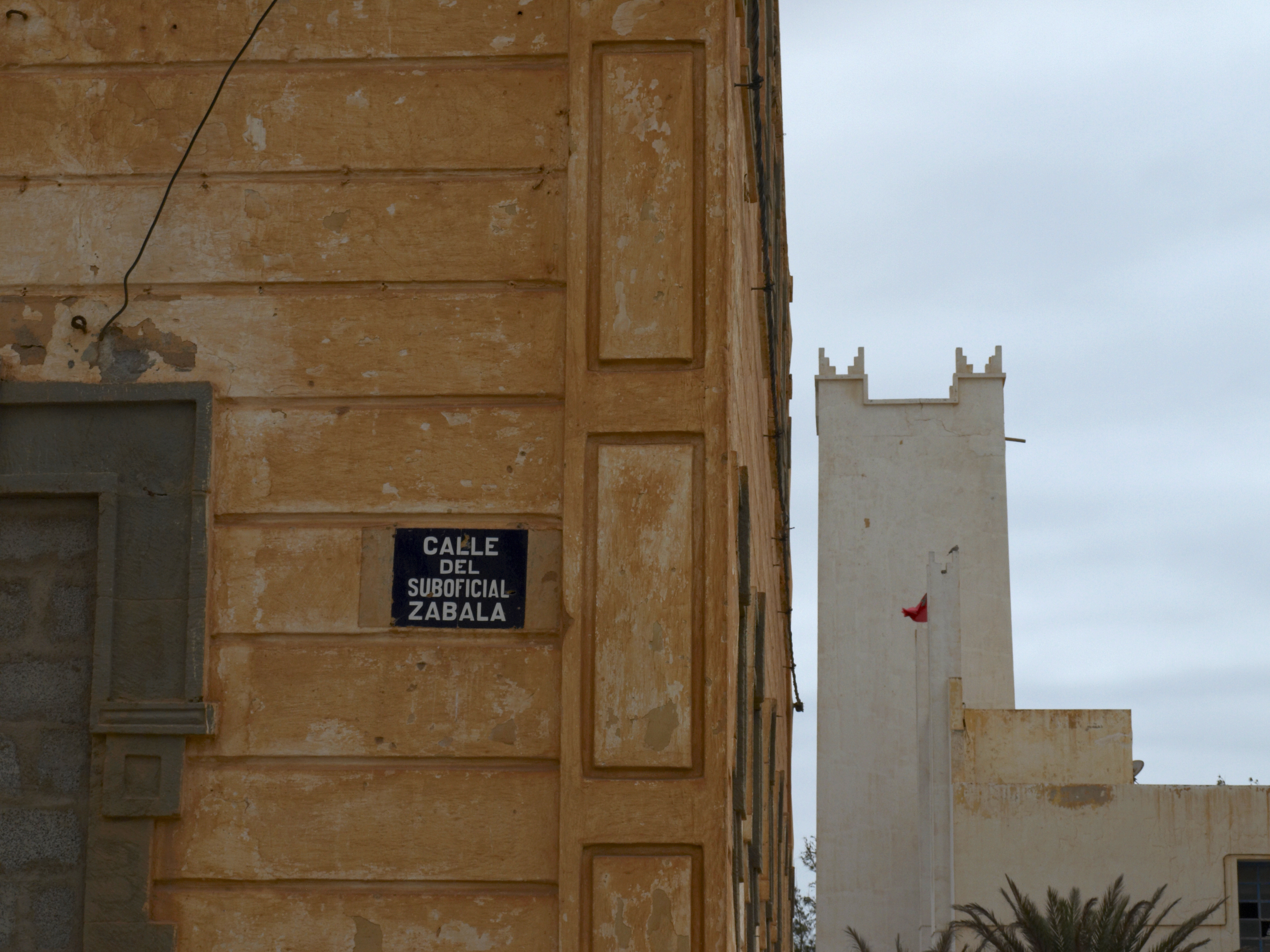

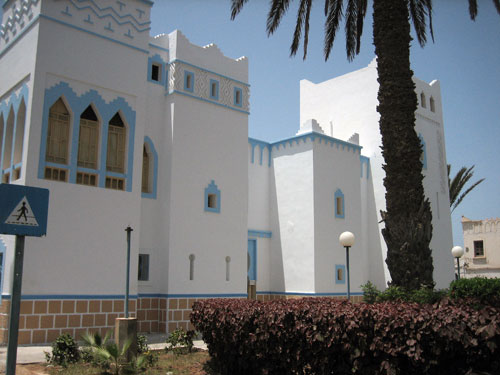
The governor's palace

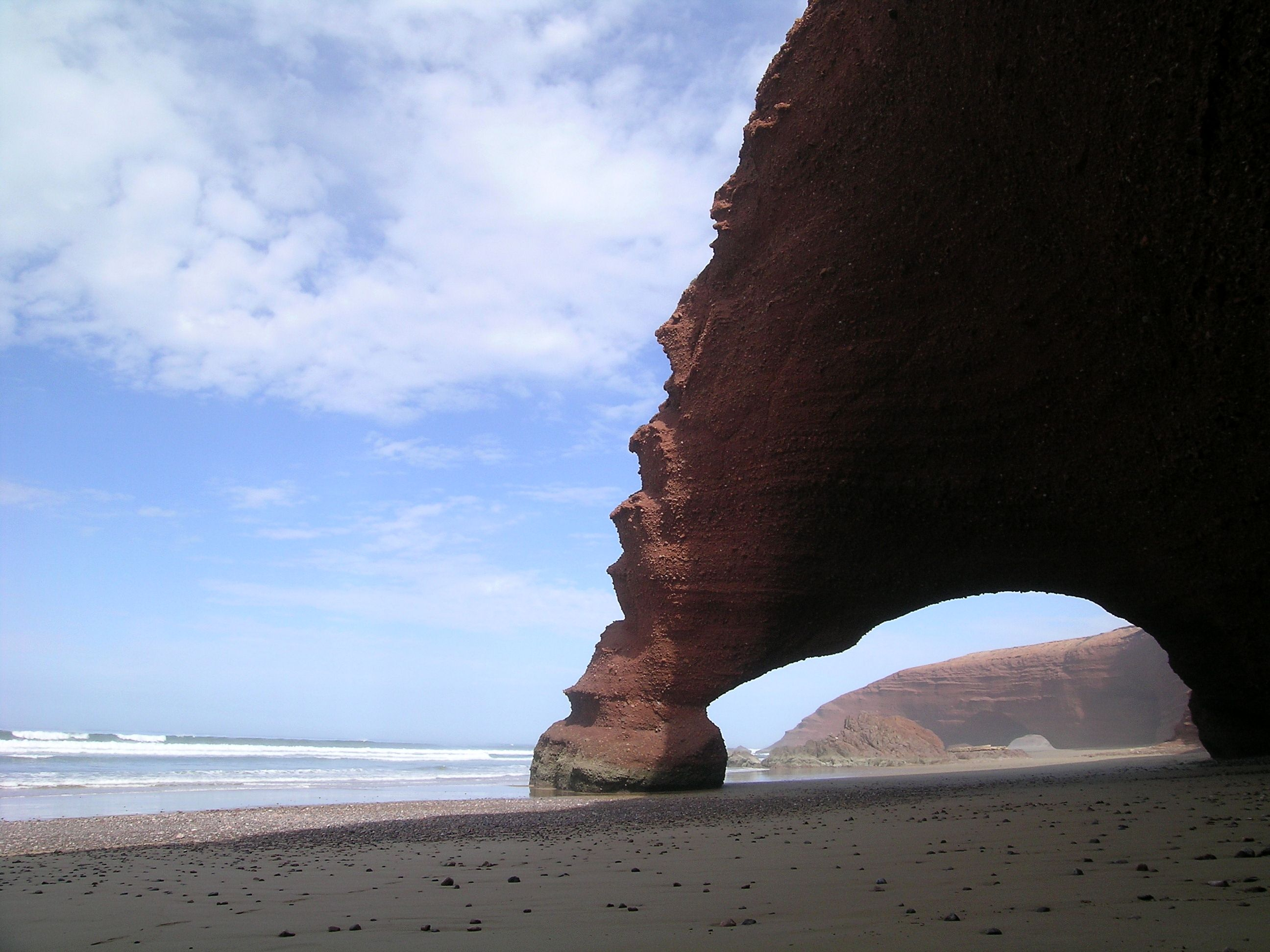
Legzira beach

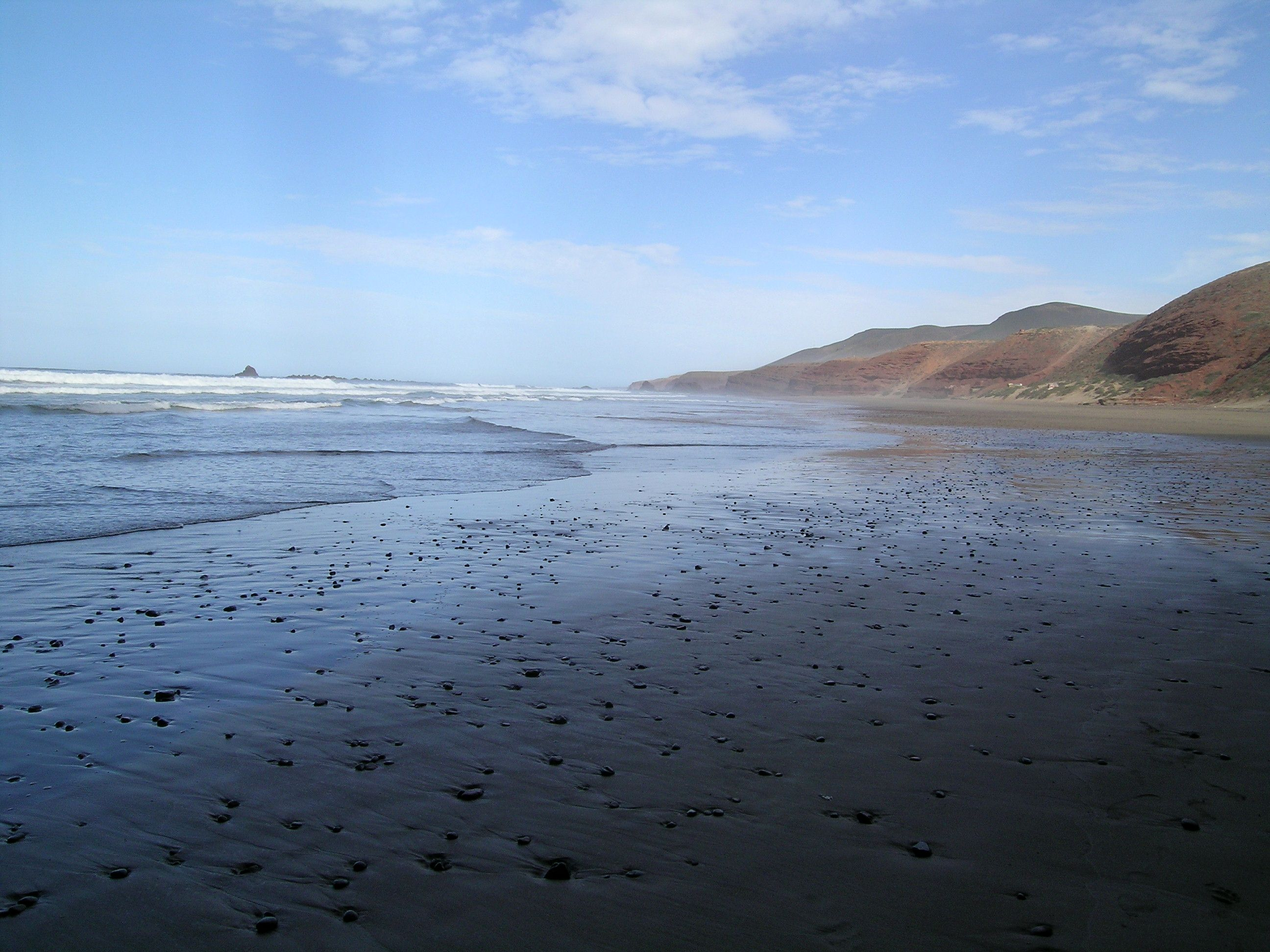
Legzira beach

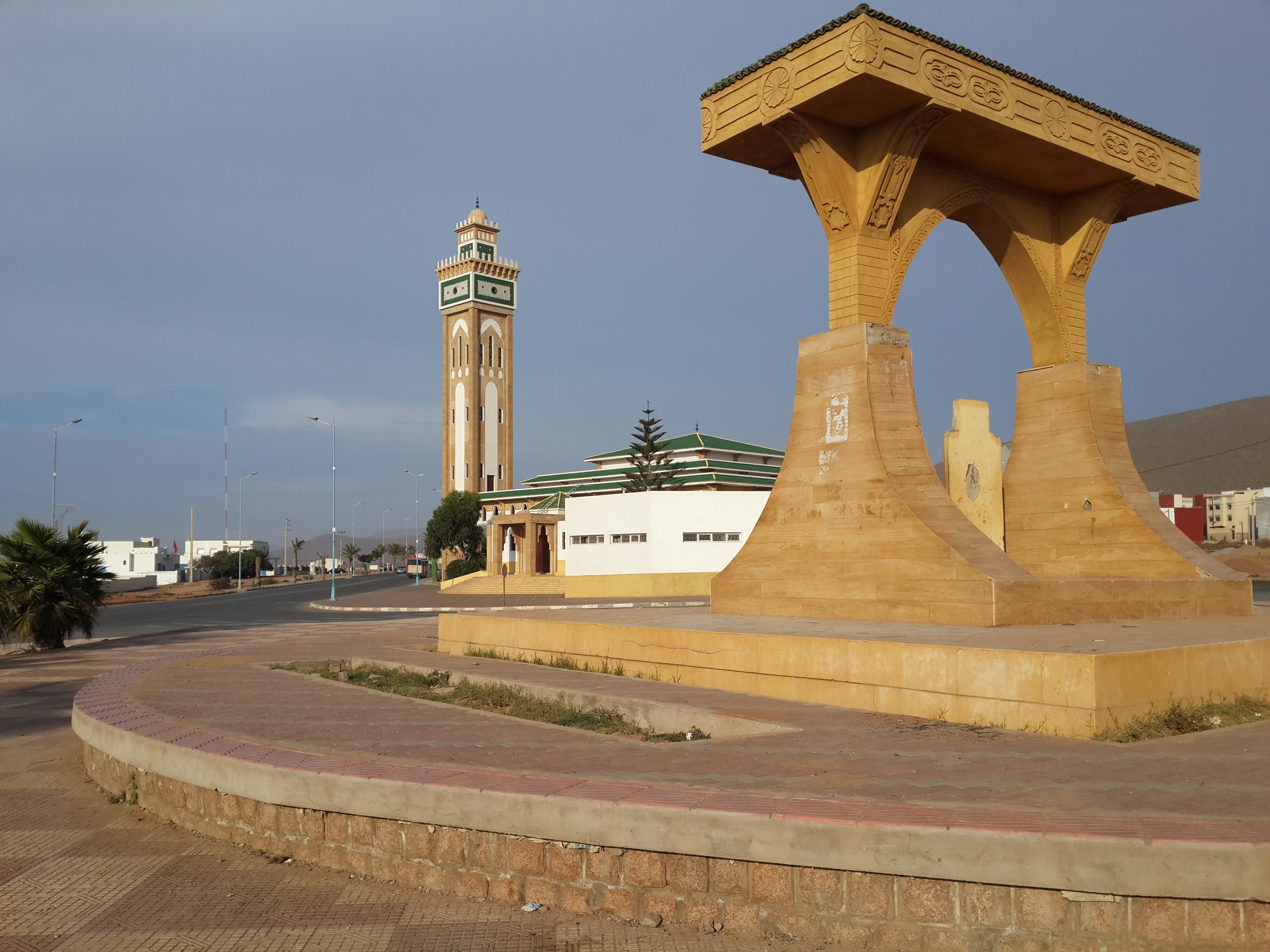
The mosque

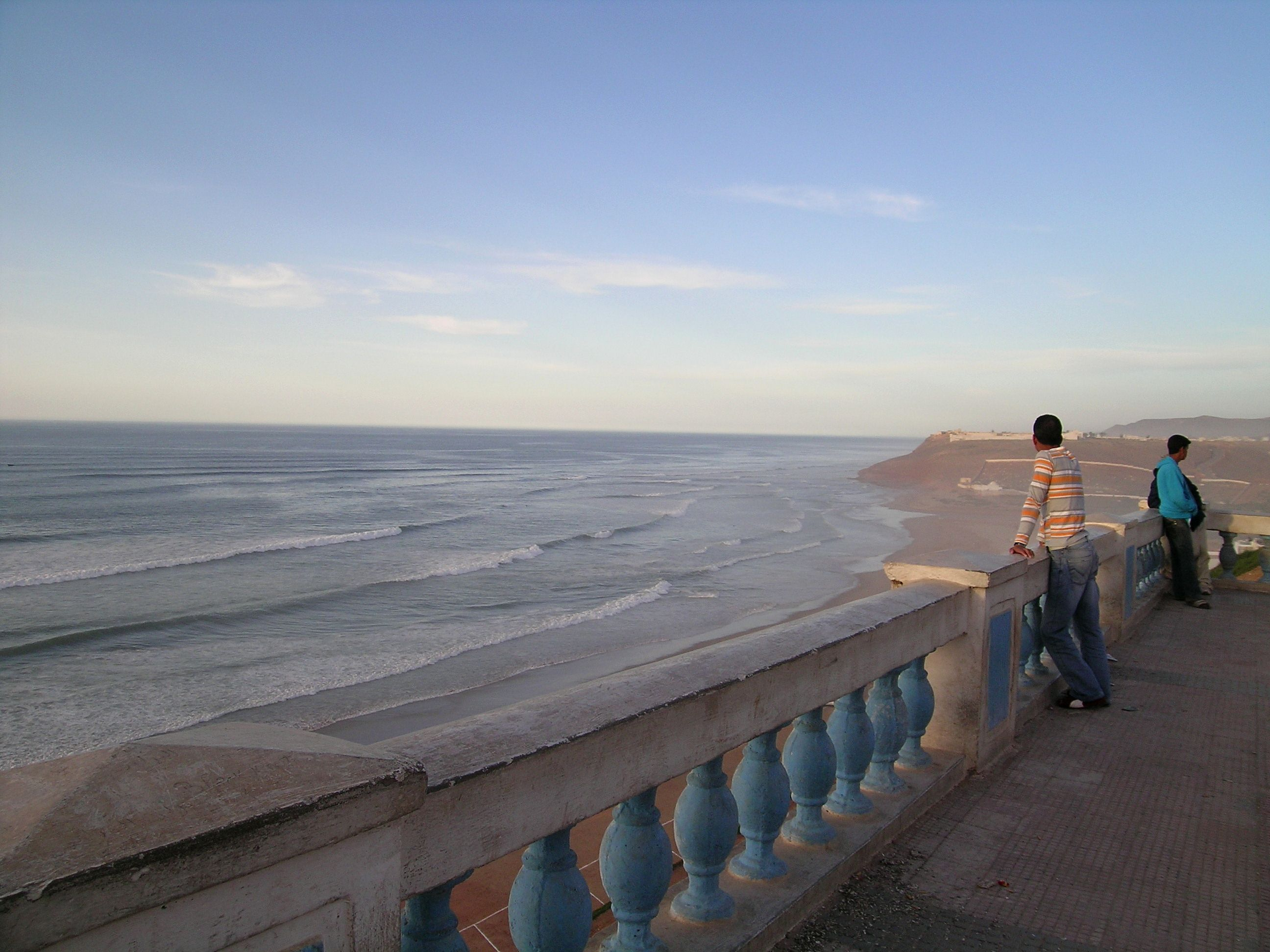
Sidi Ifni beach

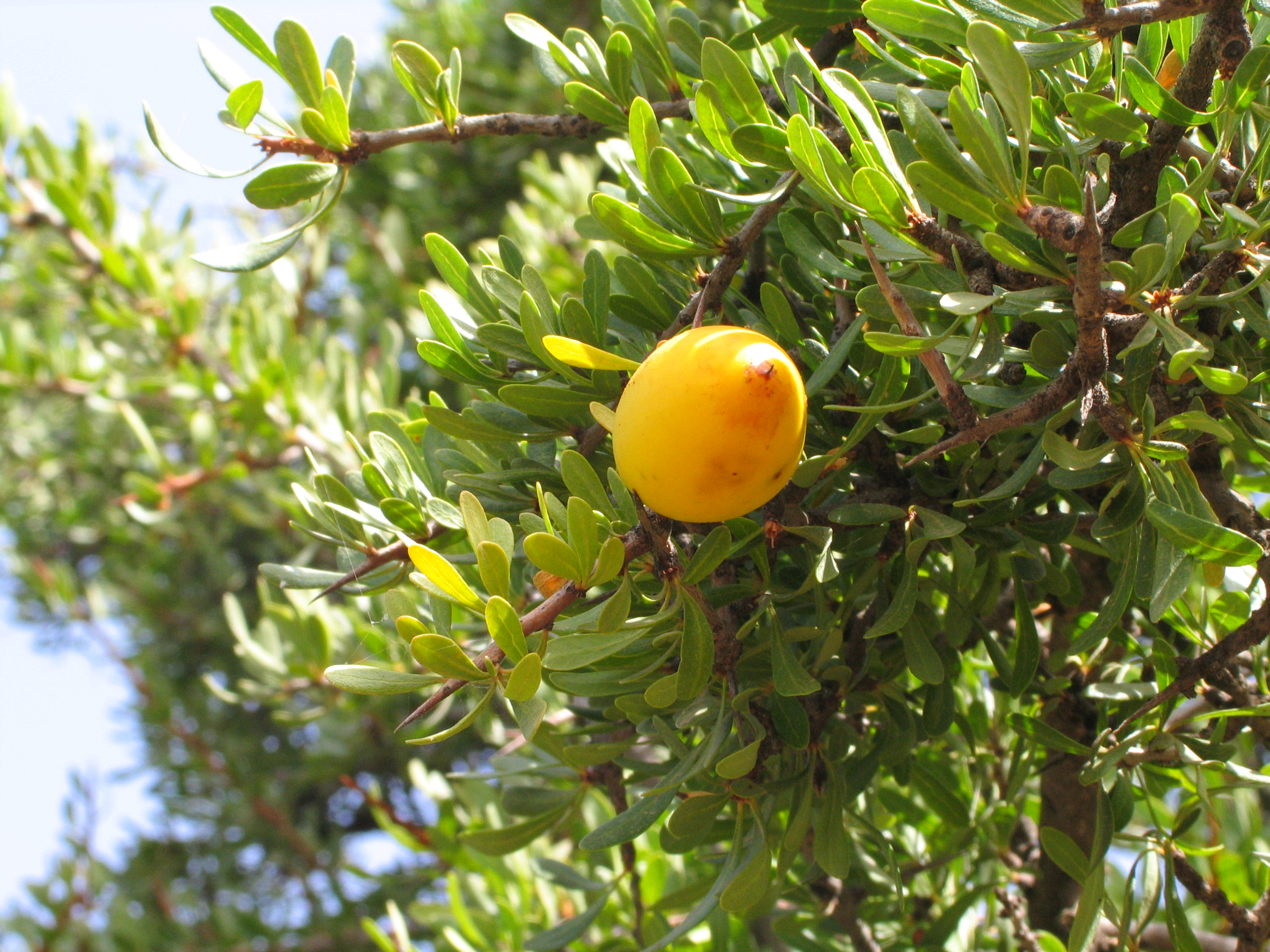
Argan

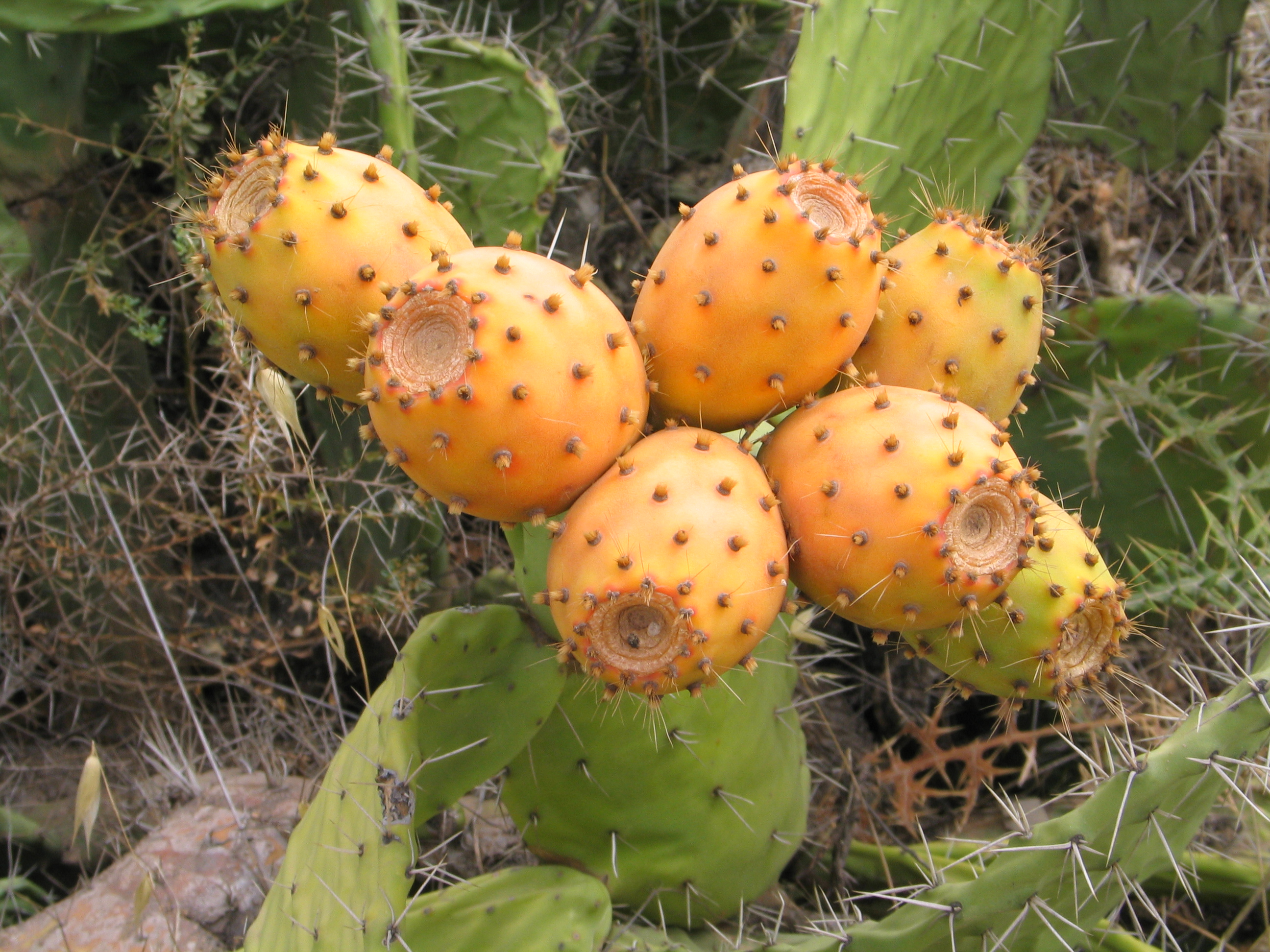
Fruits of the prickly pear

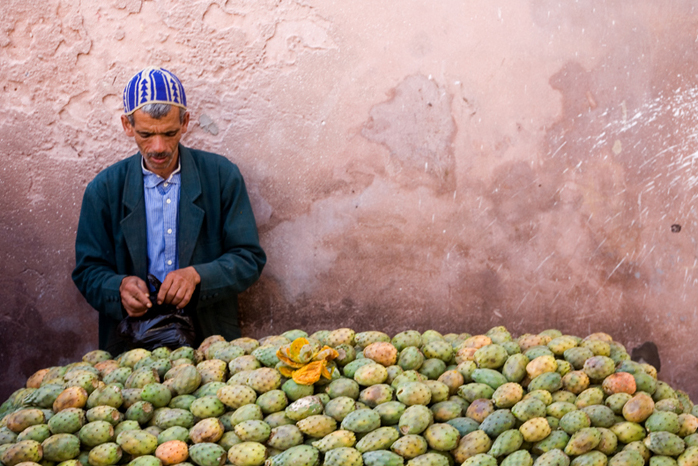
Prickly pear fruits

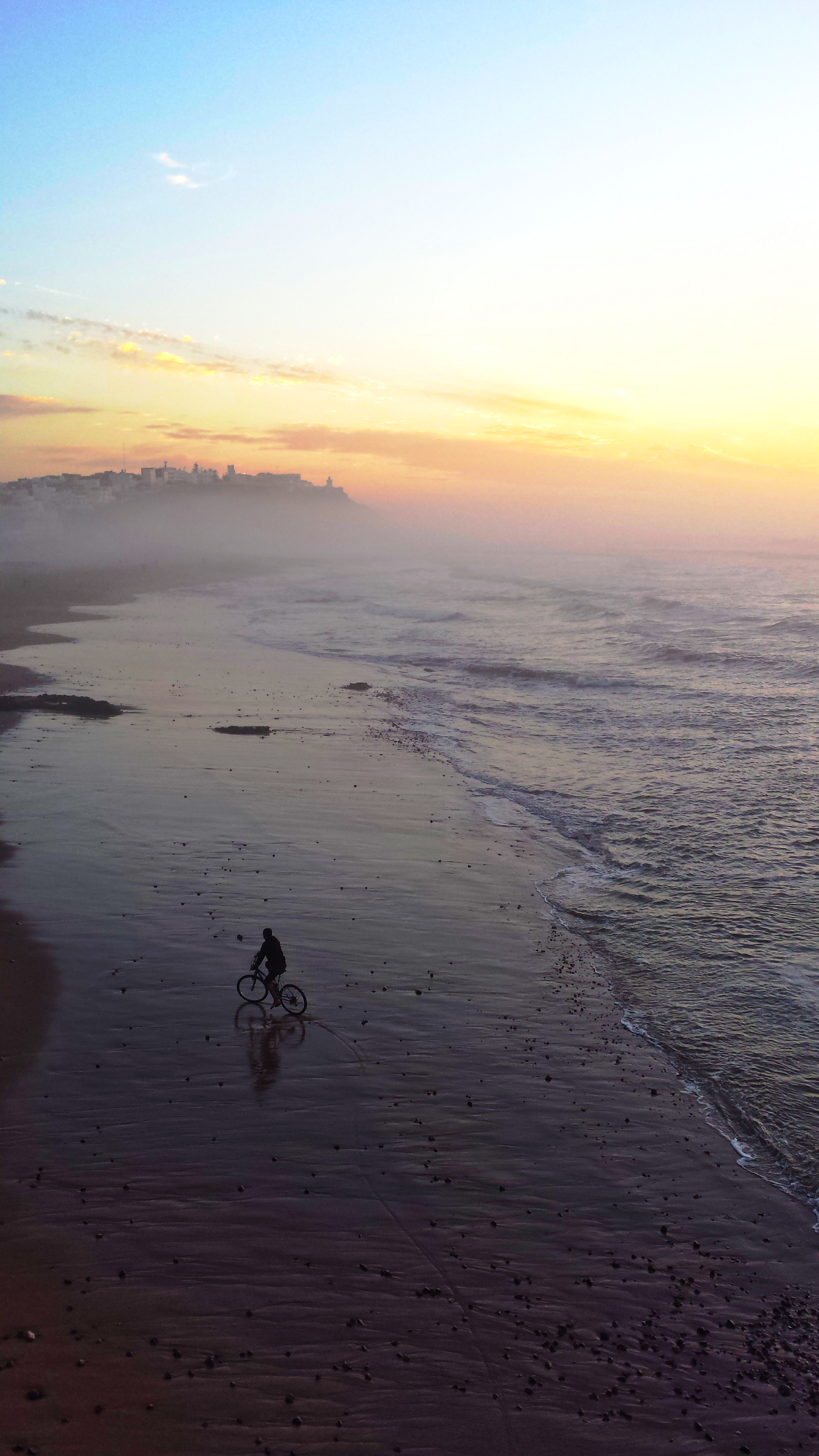
Beach in the sunset
