= Mesti, Morocco =

Coordinates: 29.29899°N 10.15231°W

Mesti
- Rural commune and town
- Interactive map of Mesti
- Country: Morocco
- Region: Guelmim-Oued Noun
- Province: Sidi Ifni Province

Population (2004)
  - Total: 3,549
- Time zone: UTC+0 (GMT)

Mesti is a small town and rural commune in Sidi Ifni Province of the Guelmim-Oued Noun region of Morocco. At the time of the 2004 census, the commune had a total population of 3,549 people living in 593 households.
