= Guelmim-Oued Noun =

Region of Morocco

Guelmim-Oued Noun Region: جهة ڭلميم-وادي نون (Arabic); ⵜⴰⵎⵏⴰⴹⵜ ⵏ ⴳⴰⵍⵎⵉⵎ ⵡⴰⴷ ⵏⵓⵏ (Standard Moroccan Tamazight)
- Region (disputed)
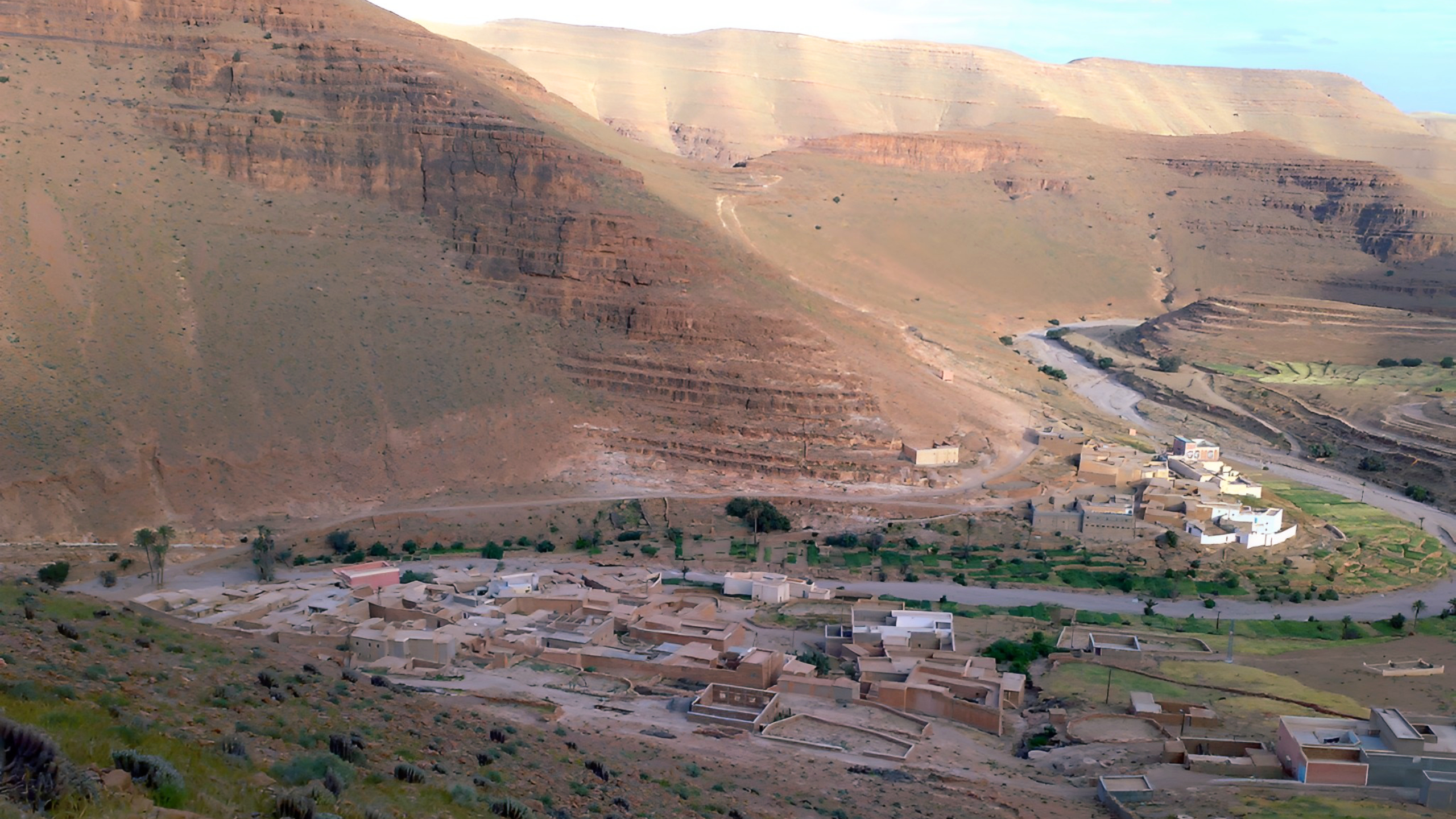

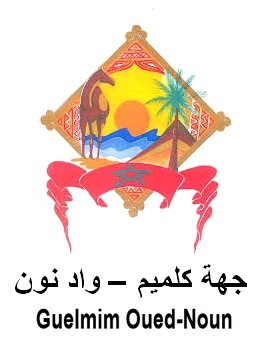
- Seal

- Location in territory claimed by Morocco
- Coordinates: 28.45°N 10.11°W
- Countries: Morocco
- Created: September 2015
- Capital: Guelmim

Government
  - Type: Governor–regional council
  - Wali: Mohamed Najem Abhai
  - President: Mbarka Bouaida (RNI)

Area
  - Total: 46,108 km^{2} (17,802 sq mi)

Population (2024)
  - Total: 448,152
  - Rank: 11th out of 12 Regions
  - Density: 9.7196/km^{2} (25.174/sq mi)
- Time zone: UTC+0 (GMT)
- ISO 3166 code: MA-10

Guelmim-Oued Noun (Note: Arabic: ڭلميم-وادي نون, romanized: gulmīm wādī nūn Standard Moroccan Tamazight: ⴳⴰⵍⵎⵉⵎ ⵡⴰⴷ ⵏⵓⵏ) is one of the twelve administrative regions of Morocco. The southeastern part of the region is located in Western Sahara, a territory that Morocco has occupied since 1975, and a small strip of land in this area is administered by the Sahrawi Arab Democratic Republic. The region as a whole covers an area of 46,108 km^{2} and had a population of 448,152 as of the 2024 Moroccan census. The capital of the region is Guelmim.

== Geography ==
Guelmim-Oued Noun borders the regions of Souss-Massa to the northeast and Laâyoune-Sakia El Hamra to the south. It borders Algeria's Tindouf Province to the east and Mauritania's Tiris Zemmour Region to the southeast. Long stretches of virgin beach line its Atlantic coast in the northwest. The region is bisected by the usually dry lower course of the Draa River which runs east to west. The capital Guelmim and the Noun River (Arabic: واد نون, romanized: wād nūn; Berber languages: ⴰⵙⵉⴼ ⵏ ⵏⵓⵏ, romanized: asif n nun) are located in the north and together give the region its name. A portion of the Moroccan Wall is located in the southeastern corner of the region: the area to its east is under the control of the Sahrawi Arab Democratic Republic.

== History ==
Guelmim-Oued Noun was formed in September 2015 by merging Sidi Ifni Province, formerly part of Souss-Massa-Drâa region, with three provinces from the former Guelmim-Es Semara region.

== Government ==
=== Subdivisions ===
Provinces of Guelmim-Oued Noun

Guelmim-Oued Noun comprises four provinces:

- Assa-Zag Province
- Guelmim Province
- Sidi Ifni Province
- Tan-Tan Province

=== Regional leadership ===
Wali of Guelmim-Oued Noun since 2015
| Name | Duration | Under |
|---|---|---|
| Mohamed Benribag | 2015–2017 | King Mohammed VI |
| Mohamed Najem Abhai | 2017–present | King Mohammed VI |

Regional Council Presidents of Guelmim-Oued Noun since 2015
| Name | Duration | Party | Under |
|---|---|---|---|
| Abderrahim Bouaida | 2015–2019 | PAM | King Mohammed VI |
| Mbarka Bouaida | 2019–present | RNI | King Mohammed VI |

== Economy and infrastructure ==
Fishing is an important economic activity: there are ports at Sidi Ifni and at El Ouatia. Beach tourism is under development. The major roads in the region are the N1 and N12. There are airports at Guelmim and Tan-Tan.
