= Sous expedition =

Moroccan expedition to Sous

Sous expedition (1882–1895)
- West Coast of Africa from Agadir to Cape Bojador.
Date	May 1882 – 13 March 1895
Location	Sous and Cape Juby
Result	Moroccan victory: Reestablishment of Moroccan authority in the Sous region.
Territorial changes	Moroccan purchase of the British North West Africa Company.; British recognition of Moroccan suzerainty on the territory between Oued Draa and Cape Bojador.

Belligerents
Morocco	Emirate of Tazerwalt; Sheikhdom of Guelmim: United Kingdom; (United Kingdom) British North West Africa Company

Commanders and leaders
(Morocco) Moulay Hassan (Morocco) Ma al-'Aynayn	Sheikh Husayn ben Hisham; Sheikh Mohamed Bayruk (United Kingdom) Donald Mackenzie (United Kingdom) William Kirby Green (United Kingdom) Ernest Satow

The Sous expedition were a series of military expeditions conducted by Sultan Moulay Hassan of Morocco in the Sous region between 1882 and 1895. As a result of these campaigns, a series of Moroccan posts were established to the south of Agadir: at Tiznit, Kasbah Ba Amrane, Assaka and at Guelmim. In addition to these posts, the more obvious and more commanding points of governmental control, Moulay Hassan also invested with official authority many of the local qaids in southwestern Morocco—such as the Qaid of Oued Noun, Dahman ben Bayruk, and the Qaid of Tazerwalt. An investiture of Moroccan authority was as well accorded to the qaids of the Ait Oussa and the Tajakant.

== Background ==
In 1879 the Englishman Donald Mackenzie set up the British North West African Company and persuaded Sheikh Mohamed Bayruk of Guelmim to cede him a strip of land, two miles wide and eight miles long at Tarfaya. There he built his factory, called Port Victoria, at the entrance of Cape Juby. Sultan Moulay Hassan did not believe that Bayruk had any right to cede Moroccan land, but the British government did not recognise his own claim of sovereignty. The sultan tried to interest the master of Iligh (Tazerwalt), Husayn ben Hisham, in reining in Bayruk and Mackenzie, but Husayn was a very autonomous subject and was negotiating on his own account with French and German representatives.

The objective of Mackenzie in the south of Oued Noun was to establish a trading post in order to divert Saharan trade directed to Essaouira towards Río de Oro. In addition to his economic benefits, the sultan feared that the North West African Company created by the English adventurer, who wanted to make the Sahara bloom, would awaken the separatist tendencies of Sheikh Husayn ben Hisham of Tazerwalt and Sheikh Mohamed Bayruk of Guelmim, who had assumed the right to cede to Mackenzie the territory on which he erected his trading post.

In 1881 the sultan decided to make Agadir the new gateway to southern Morocco, which was first used to supply the military expedition. The following year, he sent a circular letter to provincial governors all over Morocco explaining that his expedition to the Sous was to a region that had not been in ‘intimate relations’ with the Makhzen for many years.

== Expedition ==
=== Expedition of 1882 ===
In 1882 Moulay Hassan launched a major military expedition to the south of the country. He assembled in Marrakesh a powerful army of 25–40,000 men, belonging all to the Guish tribes, and between fifteen and thirty artillery pieces, as well as the new units of the ‘Askar. Special attention was paid to questions of stewardship and, so that his army would not lack anything, the sultan hired two steamers, one English – the Greenwood – the other French – L’Amélie – to transport food and ammunition along the coast from Casablanca and El Jadida to Agadir, then from Agadir to Massa and Aglou, north of Ifni.

The campaign began in May 1882 from Marrakech. Through Chichaoua and Iml-n-Tanoust, the army arrived to Agadir where L'Amélie was waiting for the sultan. Then she took the road towards Taroudant, the capital of Sous, where Moulay Hassan received the allegiance of the notables of the province. After appointing new qaids, he headed for the coast, in Massa, where L'Amélie was still waiting. With his troops replenished, the sultan descended towards Tiznit from where he planned to go to Aglou, only a few kilometers from Ifni on the coast. L'Amélie had to unload new provisions to allow the convoy to continue its march to Guelmim, the intended end of the expedition. But the sea went wild and the French steamer could not dock at Aglou. Moulay Hassan hurried back to Massa, then to Agadir. Failing to impose his will on the sheikhs Bayruk and Husayn ben Hisham, he asked them to join him in Agadir. The Sheikh of Tazerwalt sent his son there; Sheikh Bayruk personally came to meet the sultan. Moulay Hassan covered both of them with honours and urged them to assume their responsibilities in the face of European penetration.

Before his return to Marrakech on August 11, 1882, the sultan had Tiznit fortified, which thus became a Makhzen city, a short distance from the coast coveted by Spain and the British North West African Company. This, however, was not enough to put an end to the actions of Europeans or the separatist actions of the Ait Ba Amrane in the Tarfaya region. In 1883 Mackenzie's factory was attacked.

=== Expedition of 1886 ===
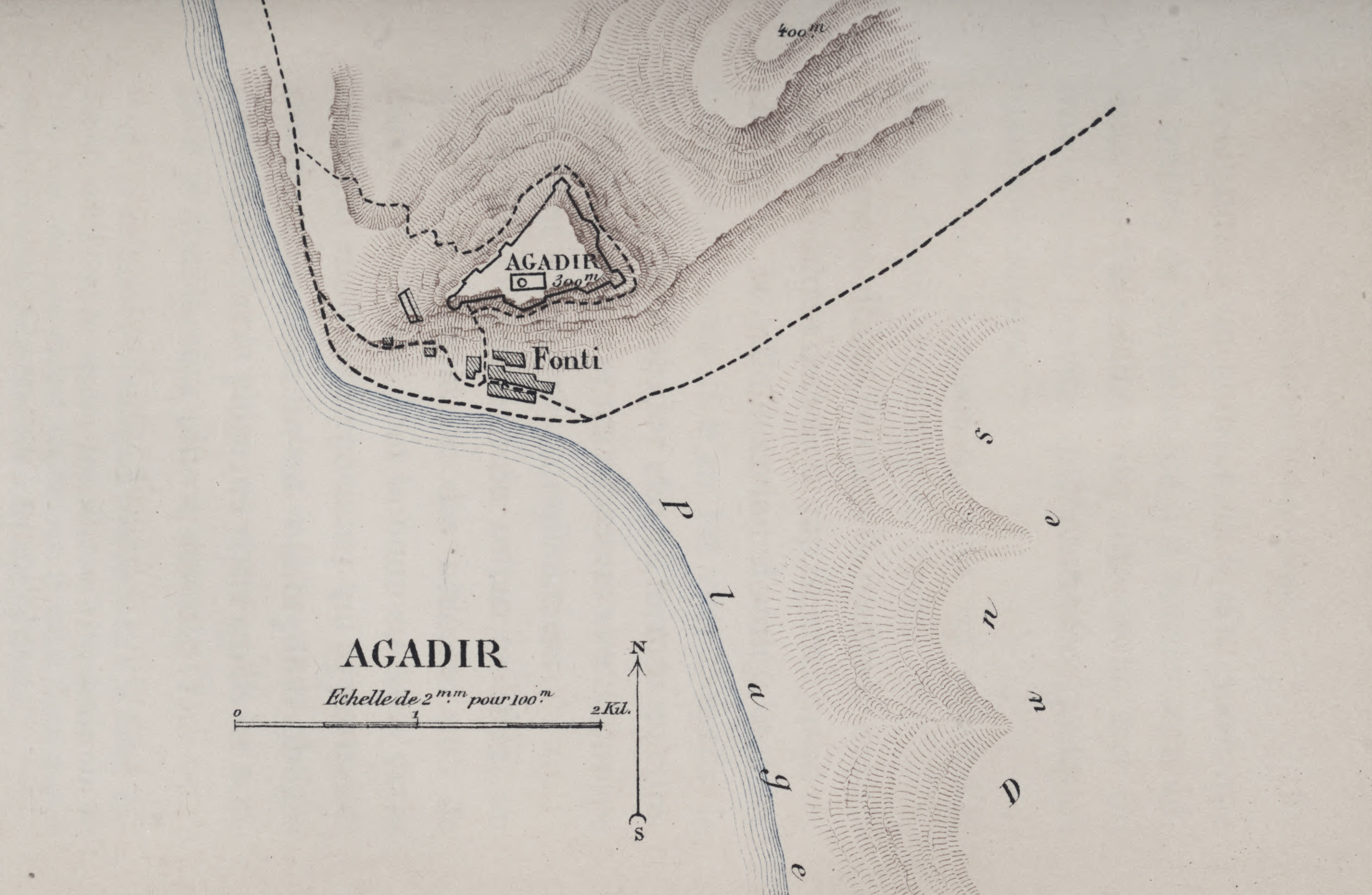
Map of Agadir, 1885.

In 1886 Moulay Hassan decided to launch a second expedition in the region. Learning from the previous operation, this time he renounced the use of European steamers taking care to supply the mahalla through the different stages in which it had to pass. An important place was given in this operation to the kasbah of Tiznit, the main base of operations against the Ba Amrane and their counterparts of Oued Noun.

The army left its camps in Marrakech on March 17, 1886 to Agadir, following the same route as the previous expedition. Six weeks later, the army reached Tiznit without too much difficulty. There, the sultan was joined by the son of Sheikh Husayn ben Hisham of Tazerwalt, who on this occasion renewed his allegiance and that of the leff of Iggizzulen, whose father was the spiritual leader. The latter, in explanation to the sultan, was too old to move to Tiznit, remaining mostly enclosed in his Zawiya of Iligh. In accordance with the policy of ‘association’ of the great ‘feudal’ chiefs, it was his son that Moulay Hassan granted, some time later, the title of qaid to ensure his collaboration in the face of European encroachments in the extreme south of the country.

After going deeper towards Oued Noun, the mahalla stopped at Guelmim, where the sultan installed a kasbah not far from the staging area of the trans-Saharan caravans. From there he went down to the coast, then to Assaka, Ifni, and Tarfaya. From there, in 1886, a smaller mahalla forced Mackenzie and his people to leave Tarfaya, which caused arguments with the British Minister in Tangier Sir William Kirby Green about indemnifying the North West African Company for its loss, but it did reestablish the Makhzen in the region.

=== Expedition of 1888–1895 ===
In 1887, after the Spanish army set up their new post at Villa Cisneros, Moulay Hassan appointed his first khalifa over the Sahara, Sheikh Muhammad Mustafa uld Mamun, commonly called Ma al-'Aynayn. He was well disposed towards the Makhzen, as his father had been before him. In 1890, Moulay Hassan received the marabout at Marrakesh. Ma al-'Aynayn went on to fight the British.

Disturbed by the aid of the tribes of Izerguiin, Yaggout and Ait Lhassen were giving to Mackenzie, Moulay Hassan had first sought to intimidate them in 1884. Then in 1888 Moroccan soldiers came to Cape Juby and attacked the trading station, killing Mackenzie and pillaging his stores. Britain sent a warship and Morocco was obliged to pay compensation of 5,000 pounds. Subsequently, the English government tried to guard control of Cape Juby for commercial reasons, but without success. The company was attacked again in 1889.

In 1895 the British Minister in Tangier, Sir Ernest Satow, agreed that if the Makhzen bought out the British North African Company, Mackenzie's factory on Cape Juby would be removed and his government would recognise Moroccan sovereignty over the coast and hinterland as far as Cape Bojador. The English ceded, for a sum of 50,000 pounds, their trading station of Port Victoria to the Sherifian sultan, recognizing by the same treaty his rights on regions where they had long disputed them—the territories between Oued Draa and Cape Bojador. The United States approved this recognition, as these territories belong to Morocco.

== Aftermath ==
In 1882 and 1886 Moulay Hassan's armies managed to re-establish Moroccan control in the desert regions bordering on the Atlantic.

== Bibliography ==
- Abitbol, Michel (2014). Histoire du Maroc (PDF) (in French). Éditions Perrin. ISBN 978-2-262-03816-8.
- Barbier, Maurice (1982). Le conflit du Sahara occidental (in French). Harmattan. ISBN 9782858021970.
- Gaudio, Attilio (1993). Les populations du Sahara occidental: histoire, vie et culture (in French). KARTHALA Editions. ISBN 9782865374113.
- Hertslet, Edward (2013). The Map of Africa by Treaty. Routledge. ISBN 9781136019180.
- Pennell, Richard (2000). Morocco Since 1830: A History. C. Hurst & Co. Publishers. ISBN 9781850654261.
- Rézette, Robert (1975). Le Sahara occidental et les frontières marocaines (in French). Nouvelles Editions Latines. ISBN 9782723317368.
- Trout, Frank E. (1969). Morocco's Saharan Frontiers. Librairie Droz. ISBN 9782600044950.
