= List of power stations in Morocco =

This article lists all power stations in Morocco.

== Hydroelectric ==
Hydroelectric power station	Community	Coordinates	River	Type	Reservoir	Capacity (MW)	Year completed
Afourer Pumped Storage Station	Afourer			Pumped storage		465	2004
Al Massira Dam	Settat					128	1979
Al Wahda Dam						240	1997
Allal al Fassi Dam						240	1994
Bin el Ouidane Dam	Beni Mellal					135	1953
El Borj Hydropower Station	Khénifra			Run of river	N/A	22	
Hassan I Dam	Demnate					67.2	1991
Idriss I Dam						40	1978
El Kansera Dam	Meknes					8.3	1946
Mohamed V Dam	Zaio					23	1967
Tanafnit hydropower Station	Khénifra			Run of river	N/A	18	

== Thermal ==
Thermal power station	Community	Coordinates	Fuel type	Capacity (MW)	Year completed	Owner
Jorf Lasfar Thermal Power Station	Jorf Lasfar	33.105225°N 8.636734°W	Coal	2056	2001	TAQA Morocco
Safi Thermal Power Station	Safi	32.147652°N 9.281060°W	Coal	1,386	2017	Safi Energy Company (GDF Suez + Mitsui & Co + Nareva)
Nador Thermal Power Station	Nador		Coal	1,320	Est. 2021	ONEE
Al Wahda Thermal Power Station	Al Wahda		Natural gas	800	2010	Endesa/ONEE
Kenitra Thermal Power Station	Kenitra		Coal; Natural gas	300; 315	1978; 2012	ONEE
Mohammedia Thermal Power Station	Mohammedia	33.681114°N 7.435791°W	Fuel oil & coal	600	2007	ONEE
Jerada Thermal Power Station	Jerada		Coal	515	2017	ONEE
Tahaddart Thermal Power Station	Tangier		Natural gas	384	2005	Endesa/ONEE

== Solar ==
Solar power station	Community	Coordinates	Fuel type	Technology	Capacity (MW)	Year completed	Owner
Ain Beni Mathar Solar-Thermal Power Station	Ain Bni Mathar	36.0683°N 2.1047°W	Solar & natural gas	ISCC	470	2011	ONE*
NOOR Ouarzazate Solar Power Station	Ouarzazate	31.03°N 6.86°W	Solar energy	Parabolic Trough (NOOR 1 and 2), Solar Tower (NOOR 3)	580	2016, 2018	ACWA Power Ouarzazate (MASEN, ACWA Power)
NOOR Midelt	Midelt		Solar energy	Hybrid: Parabolic Trough, PV	2x 200	under development	MASEN, EDF

== Wind ==
Wind farm	Community	Coordinates	Wind turbines	Capacity (MW)	Year completed	Owner
Akhfenir Wind Farm - Part1	Akhfenir			100	2013	Nareva
Akhfenir Wind Farm - Part2	Akhfenir			100	2017	Nareva
Cape Sim Wind Power Station	Essaouira			60	2006	ONEE
Tangier I Wind Power Station	Tangier			140	2007	ONEE
Tarfaya Wind Farm	Tarfaya		131	301	2014	Nareva
Midelt Wind Farm	Midelt			210	2021	ONEE
Aftissat Wind Farm	Boujdour			201	2018	ONEE
Haouma Wind Farm	Ksar es-Seghir			50,6	2014	ONEE
Foum el oued Farm Wind Farm	Laayoune			50,1	2013	Nareva
Ciment du Maroc Laayoune	Laayoune			5	2011	Ciments du Maroc
Dhar Sadane Farm	Tangier		126	75	2009	ONEE
Lafarge Wind Farm	Tetouan			32	2005	Lafarge ciment
YNNA Bio Power	Essaouira			20	2009	YNNA Bio Power
Koudia Al Baida	Tangier		84	50	2000	ONEE
Khalladi wind farm	Tangier			120	2018	ACWA Power

== See also ==
- List of power stations in Africa
- List of largest power stations in the world
- Energy in Morocco
- Energy policy of Morocco
