= Cape Juby =

Cape in southern Morocco

Coordinates: 27°56′52″N 12°55′24″W

Regions of Morocco in colonial times

Cape Juby (Arabic: رأس جوبي, trans. Raʾs Juby, Spanish: Cabo Juby [Yubi]) is a cape on the coast of southern Morocco, near the border with Western Sahara, directly east of the Canary Islands.

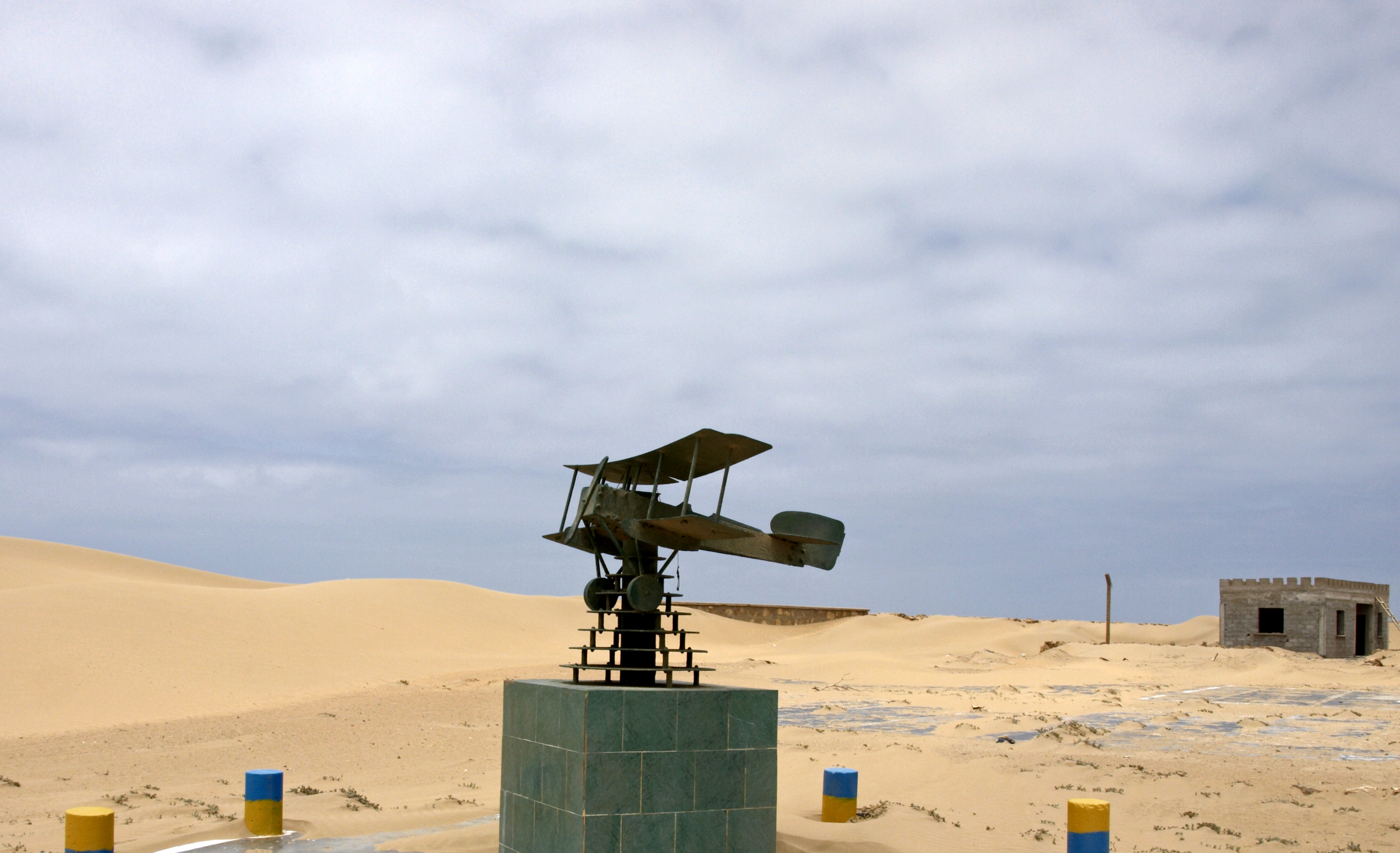
A monument in Tarfaya, Cape Juby, Morocco, commemorating Aéropostale's mail stopover station and Antoine de Saint-Exupéry, its manager

Its surrounding area, including the cities of Tarfaya and Tan-Tan, is called the Cape Juby Strip (after the homonymous cape), the Tarfaya Strip (after the homonymous city) or the Tekna Zone (after the Tekna, the native Saharawi tribe). The region is presently the far south of internationally recognized Morocco, and makes up a semi-desert buffer zone between Morocco proper at the Draa River and Western Sahara. The strip was under Spanish rule during much of the 20th century, officially as part of the Spanish protectorate in Morocco, but mainly administered alongside Saguia el-Hamra and Río de Oro as part of Spanish Sahara, with which the Strip had closer cultural and historical links.

== History ==
=== Precolonial era ===
On 28 May 1767, Mohammed ben Abdallah, the Sultan of Morocco, signed a peace and commerce treaty with King Charles III of Spain. In the treaty, Morocco was unable to guarantee the security of Spanish fishermen along the coasts south of the Noun River, as Morocco did not have control over the Tekna tribes of that area (Art. 18).

On 1 March 1799, Sultan Slimane signed an accord with King Charles IV of Spain, in which he recognized that the Saguia el-Hamra and Cape Juby regions were not part of his dominions (Art. 22).

In 1879, the British North West Africa Company established a trading post near Cape Juby called "Port Victoria". On 26 March 1888, Moroccan soldiers attacked the post, killing the director of the post and leaving two workers badly injured. In 1895, the company sold its post to the Sultan of Morocco.

=== Spanish protectorate ===
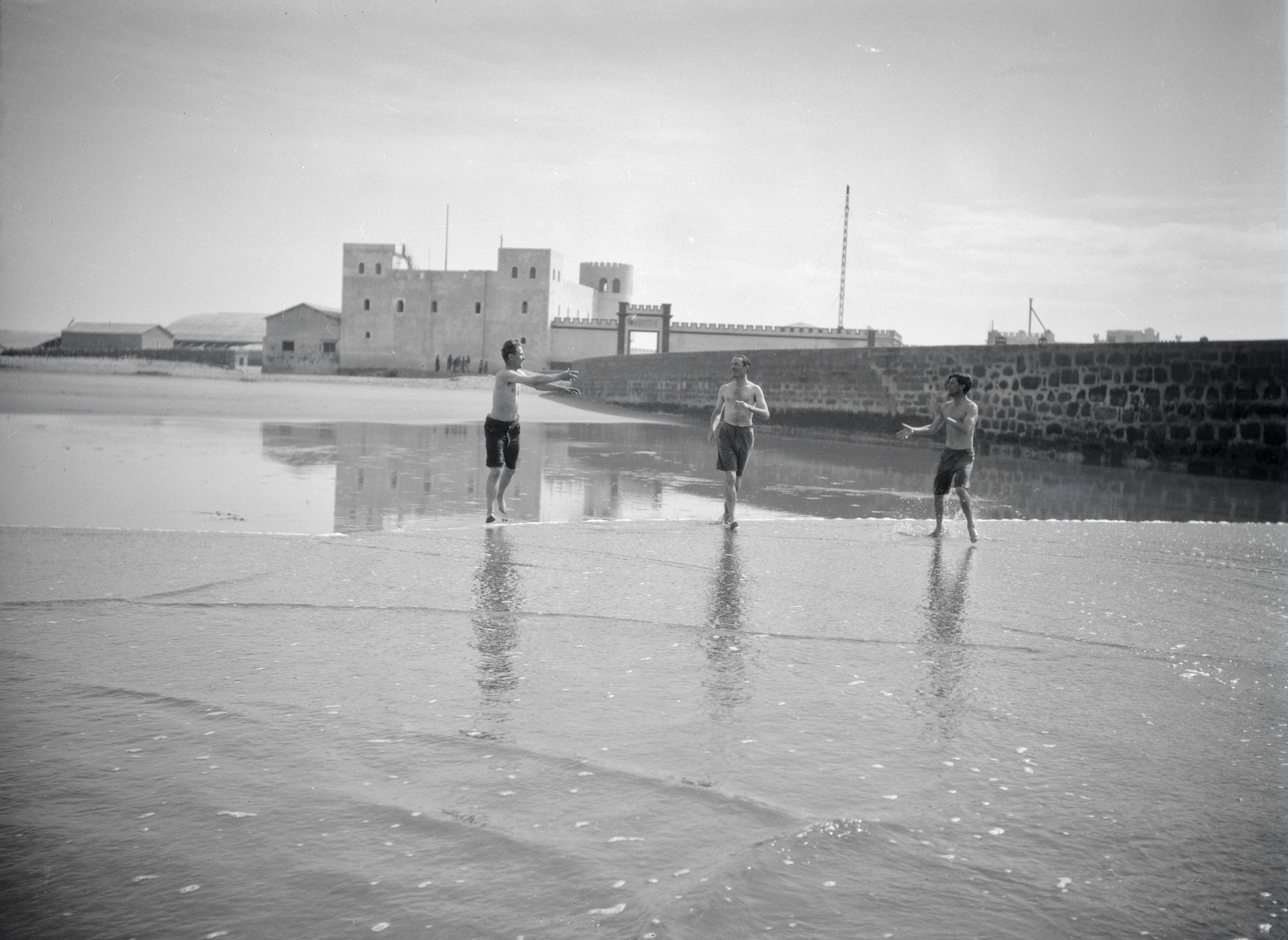
Walter Mittelholzer's traveling companions playing ball on the beach of Cape Juby, image between 1930 and 1931, during Spanish protectorate in Morocco

In 1912, Spain negotiated with France (which controlled the affairs of Morocco at the time) for concessions on the southern coast of Morocco. Francisco Bens officially occupied the Cape Juby region for Spain on 29 July 1916. It was administered by Spain as a single entity with Spanish Sahara and the Ifni enclave, as Spanish West Africa.

The Spanish area comprised 12,700 sq mi (33,000 km^{2}) and had a population of 9,836. Its main town was founded by the Spanish as Villa Bens (now called Tarfaya). Villa Bens was used as a staging post for airmail flights.

=== Retrocession to Morocco ===
When Morocco regained full independence in 1956, it requested the cession of officially Moroccan areas controlled by Spain. After some resistance and some fighting during 1957 (the Ifni War), the Spanish government in 1958 ceded the Cape Juby Strip to Morocco.

== Sahara Sea ==
In 1877, the Scottish engineer Donald Mackenzie was the first to propose the creation of a Sahara Sea. Mackenzie's idea was to cut a channel from one of the sand-barred lagoons north of Cape Juby south to a large plain which Arab traders had identified to him as El Djouf. Mackenzie believed this vast region was up to 61 metres (200 ft) below sea level and that flooding it would create an inland sea of 155,400 square kilometres (60,000 sq mi) suited to commercial navigation and even agriculture. He further believed that geological evidence suggested this basin had once been connected to the Atlantic via a channel near the Saguia el-Hamra. He proposed that this inland sea, if augmented with a canal, could provide access to the Niger River and the markets and rich resources of West Africa. There are several small depressions in the vicinity of Cape Juby; at 55 m (180 ft) below sea level, the Sebkha Tah is the lowest and largest. But it covers less than 250 km^{2} (97 sq mi) and is 500 km (310 mi) north of the geographical area identified as El Djouf (also known as the Majabat al-Koubra) which has an average elevation of 320 m. Mackenzie never travelled in this area but had read of other sub-sea level desert basins in present-day Tunisia, Algeria and Egypt similar to those found near Cape Juby. These basins contain seasonally dry salt lakes, known as chotts or sebkhas. Egypt's Qattara Depression is perhaps the largest such basin in North Africa.

== See also ==
- Postage stamps and postal history of Cape Juby
- Santa Cruz de la Mar Pequeña
- Tekna
- Ifni War
- Sahrawi
- Reguibat
- Western Sahara
- Morocco
- Sahara Sea
- Cape Bojador
- Qattara Depression
