= Child slavery =

Forced, unpaid labor of children (minors)

The enslavement of children can be traced back through history. Despite the fact that slavery has been abolished, children continue to be enslaved and trafficked to this day, particularly in developing countries. Like other forms of modern slavery, child slavery is also often linked to poverty, as some impoverished families "sell" their children to their captors because they cannot adequately take care of them and do not see any other option.

== History ==
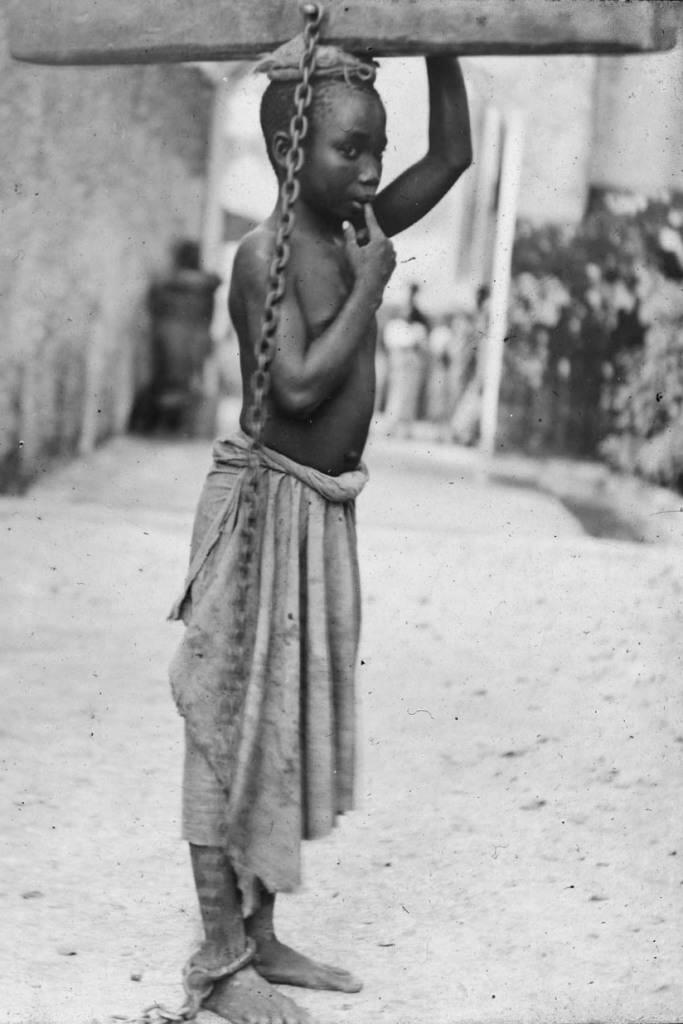
Photograph of a slave boy in the Sultanate of Zanzibar. 'An Arab master's punishment for a slight offence.' c. 1890.

Child slavery refers to the slavery of children below the age of majority. Many children have been sold into slavery in the past for their family to repay debts or crimes or earn some money if the family were short of cash.

In the Roman Empire, the children of a slave woman normally became the property of her owner. This was also the case in Korea around 1000 AD. Since slavery among the Maya and indigenous people of North America could be inherited, the children of the Indians could be born slaves.

=== In the Islamic world ===
In the entire Islamic world, the institution of slavery was regulated by the slavery regulations prescribed by religious sharia law. These also described sexual relationships with slaves and consequently child slavery.

By Islamic law, slaves could be acquired through direct capture in warfare as kafir from Dar al-harb; via a middle man trade network (essentially foreign slave merchants); or by being born in to slavery, which meant both of their parents, or their only known parent, was a slave. A Muslim man was allowed by law to have sexual intercourse with his own female slave in accordance with the principle of concubinage in Islam (without it being defined as extramarital sex or zina). The child of a slave was born a slave, unless the male slave owner acknowledged the child of his female slave as his, in which case the child would be born free.

If a master chose to acknowledge his child with his slave, then the slave mother herself would become an umm al-walad and free when her enslaver died, though she continued to be a slave during his lifetime unless he chose to manumit her. Traditionally, royal dynasties in the Muslim world customarily used slave concubines for procreation, and the children of royal concubines were routinely acknowledged. However, this was not necessarily the case with a common slave master and his female slave. The Islamic Law formally prohibited prostitution. However, since Islamic Law allowed a man to have sexual intercourse with his personal sex slave, prostitution was practiced by a pimp selling his female slave on the slave market to a client, who returned his ownership of her after 1–2 days on the pretext of discontent after having had intercourse with her, which was a legal and accepted method for prostitution in the Islamic world.

Children were also subjected to sexual exploitation. Islamic law was based on the life of Muhammed. The marriage between Muhammed and Aisha, which was reportedly consummated when the bride was nine, and marriage and sexual intercourse was customarily allowed with girls from the age of nine.

In his contemporary report A Report on Slavery and the Slave Trade in Zanzibar, Pemba, and the Mainland of the British Protectorates of East Africa from 1895, Donald MacKenzie noted, in regard to slavery in Zanzibar, that sexual slavery did not, in fact, result in many children, which necessitated the need for constant slave import:

"It is a curious fact that Slaves have but very few children, owing, it is said, to the manner in which very young girls are treated by the Arabs and others; hence the necessity for the continued importation of raw Slaves to supply the demand. I was much struck with the evidence of non-increase amongst the Slaves as regards children. Taking the death-rate at 30 per mille, upwards of 7,000 Slaves would have to be imported annually to supply this deficiency in labour".

=== In the United States ===
Novelist Harriet Beecher Stowe wrote about a woman a slave owner bought to breed children to sell. The expectations of children who were either bought or born into slavery varied. Scholars noted, "age and physical capacity, as well as the degree of dependence, set the terms of children's integration into households".

The duties that child slaves were responsible for performing are disputed among scholars. A few representations of the lives that slave children led portrayed them as, "virtually divorced from the plantation economy until they were old enough to be employed as field hands, thereby emphasizing the carefree nature of childhood for a part of the slave population that was temporarily spared forced labor". This view also stated that if children were asked to perform any duties at all, it was to perform light household chores, such as being "organized into 'trash gangs' and made to collect refuse about the estate". Opposing scholars argued that slave children had their youth stolen from them, and were forced to start performing adult duties at a very young age. Some say that children were forced to perform field labor duties as young as the age of six. It is argued that in some areas children were put to "regular work in the antebellum South" and it "was a time when slaves began to learn work routines, but also work discipline and related punishment".

A degree of self-possession was present in some degree to adults, but "children retained the legal incapacities of dependence even after they had become productive members of households". It was reported by scholars that, "this distinctive status shaped children's standing within familial households and left them subject to forced apprenticeship, even after emancipation". There were slave owners who did not want child slaves or women who were pregnant for fear that the child would have "took up too much of her time".

The conditions of slavery for pregnant women varied regionally. In most cases, women worked in the fields up until childbirth performing small tasks. "four weeks appears to have been the average confinement period, or 'lying-in period', for antebellum slave women following delivery in the South as a whole". Slaveholders in northern Virginia, however, usually only permitted an average lying-in period of about "two weeks before ordering new mothers back to work". The responsibility of raising and tending to the children then became the task of other children and older elderly slaves. In most institutions of slavery throughout the world, the children of slaves became the property of the owner. This created a constant supply of people to perform labor. This was the case with, for example, thralls and American slaves. In other cases, children were enslaved as if they were adults. Usually, the mother's status determined if the child was a slave, but some local laws varied the decision to the father. In many cultures, slaves could earn their freedom through hard work and buying their own freedom.

== Modern day ==
Although the abolition of slavery in much of the world has greatly reduced child slavery, the problem lives on, especially in developing countries. According to the Anti-Slavery Society, "Although there is no longer any state which legally recognizes, or which will enforce, a claim by a person to a right of property over another, the abolition of slavery does not mean that it ceased to exist. There are millions of people throughout the world—mainly children—in conditions of virtual to slavery." It further notes that slavery, particularly child slavery, was on the rise in 2003. It points out that there are countless others in other forms of servitude (such as peonage, bonded labor, and servile concubinage) that are not slavery in the narrow legal sense. Critics claim they are stretching the definition and practice of slavery beyond its original meaning and are actually referring to forms of unfree labor other than slavery. In 1990, reports of slavery came out of Bahr al Ghazal, a Dinka region in southern Sudan. In 1995, Dinka mothers spoke about their abducted children. Roughly 20,000 slaves were reported in Sudan in 1999. "The handmade woolen carpet industry is extremely labor-intensive and one of the largest export earners for India, Pakistan, Nepal and Morocco." During the past 20 years, about 200,000 and 300,000 children have been involved, most of them in the carpet belt of Uttar Pradesh in central India. Many children in Asia are kidnapped or trapped in servitude, where they work in factories and workshops for no pay and receive constant beatings. Slaves have reappeared following the old slave trade routes in West Africa. "The children are kidnapped or purchased for $20–$70 each in poorer states, such as Benin and Togo, and sold into slavery in sex dens or as unpaid domestic servants for $350.00 each in wealthier oil-rich states, such as Nigeria and Gabon."

=== Trafficking ===
Trafficking of children includes recruiting, harboring, obtaining, and transporting children by use of force or fraud for the purpose of subjecting them to involuntary acts, such as commercial sexual exploitation (including prostitution) or involuntary labor, i.e., enslavement. Some see human trafficking as the modern form of slavery. Human trafficking is the trade of human beings and their use by criminals to make money. The majority of trafficking victims are adults, predominantly made up of women forced into prostitution, but children make up many victims forced into prostitution.

In Ukraine, a survey conducted by the non-governmental organization (NGO) La Strada-Ukraine in 2001–2003, based on a sample of 106 women being trafficked out of Ukraine found that 3% were under 18, and the US State Department reported in 2004 that incidents of minors being trafficked was increasing. In Thailand, NGOs have estimated that up to a third of prostitutes are children under 18, many trafficked from outside Thailand.

The United Nations Special Rapporteur on the sale of children, child prostitution and child pornography estimates that about one million children in Asia alone are victims of the sex trade.

Following the 2010 Haiti earthquake, Save the Children, World Vision and the British Red Cross have called for an immediate halt to adoptions of Haitian children not approved before the earthquake, warning that child traffickers could exploit the lack of regulation. An Office of the United Nations High Commissioner for Human Rights spokesman said that child enslavement and trafficking was "an existing problem and could easily emerge as a serious issue over the coming weeks and months".

=== Child soldiers ===
The United Nations defines child soldier as "A child associated with an armed force or armed group refers to any person below 18 years of age who is, or who has been, recruited or used by an armed force or armed group in any capacity, including but not limited to children, boys, and girls, used as fighters, cooks, porters, spies or for sexual purposes." In 2007, Human Rights Watch estimated that 200,000 to 300,000 children served as soldiers in current conflicts. In 2012, this estimation rose to be around 300,000 in only twenty countries. Around 40% of child soldiers are believed to be girls, that have been taken and used as sex slaves and 'wives'.

According to United Nations, children associated with armed forces and groups can be used in various roles, including combat, support functions, and even acts of terror such as suicide bombings, with reports of children as young as 8 or 9 being involved in armed conflict.

During the 2026 Iran war, Rahim Nadali, an IRGC official in Tehran, announced the launch of the initiative "For Iran" which recruits 12 year olds into the Basij militia for them to assist in manning "operational patrols" and checkpoints, as well as providing logistical support and performing other duties. This move contradicts Iran's commitment to abstain from the use of children in military activities under the Convention on the Rights of the Child. However, Nadali justified to move stating "Given that the age of those coming forward has dropped and they are asking to take part, we lowered the minimum age to 12". According to Al-Arabiya, from the beginning of the war, Tehran residents reported of untrained teenagers and youths armed with Uzi sub-machine guns and Kalshnikov rifles, stopping vehicles, shouting orders, and firing warning shots into the air.

=== Forced labor ===
More girls under 16 work as domestic workers than any other category of child labor, often sent to cities by parents living in rural poverty such as in restaveks in Haiti. Globally, in 2016, 25 million were in forced labor, with 16 million of them subjected to forced labor exploitation in sectors such as domestic work, construction, and agriculture, with children particularly vulnerable. When it comes to children, 152 million children are engaged in child labor, many of whom work in hazardous conditions.

== See also ==
- Children in the military
- Children's Care International
- Andrew Forrest – Australian mining businessman and team principal (born 1961)
- Slavery in the 21st century
- Walk Free – International human rights organisation based in Australia

== Bibliography ==
- Ames, Kenneth M. (2001). "Slaves, chiefs and labour on the northern Northwest Coast". World Archaeology. The Archeology of Slavery. 33 (1). Taylor & Francis: 1–17. doi:10.1080/00438240120047591. ISSN 0043-8243. JSTOR 827885.
