= List of wind farms in Morocco =

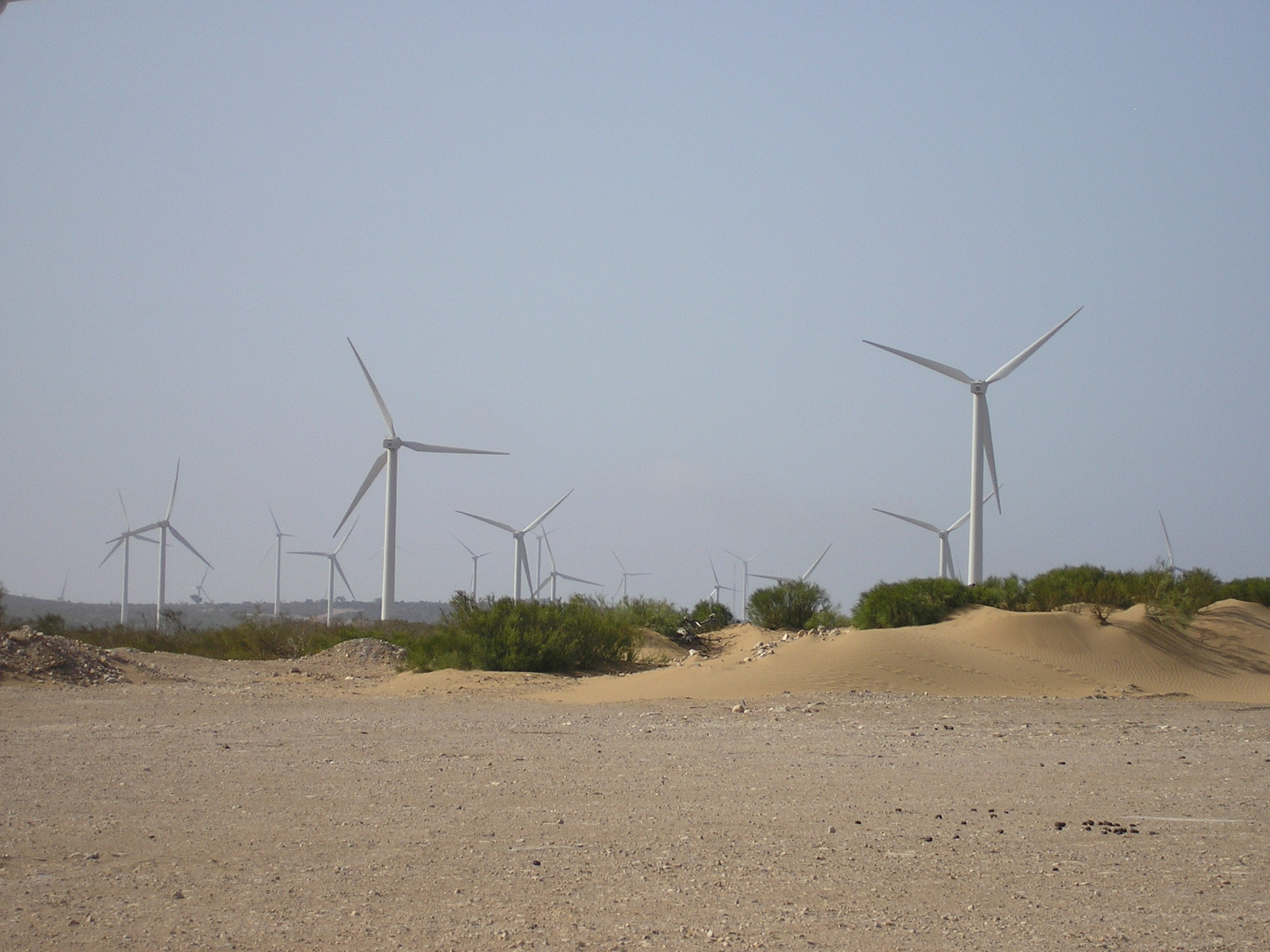
Amogdoul Wind Farm, Essaouira

As of 2020, Morocco had an installed wind power capacity of 1400 MW.

As of 2013, there was an installed capacity of 947 MW and 500 MW are under construction.

== List of completed farms ==
Name	Year of completion	Total number of turbines	Capacity (MW)	City	Illustration
Midelt Wind Farm	2021		210 MW		
Boujdour Aftissat wind farm	2018		201,6 MW		
Khalladi (Tangier) wind farm	2018		120 MW		
Akhfenir Wind Farm (owned by Nareva)	2013		200 MW		
Tarfaya Wind Farm (owned by Nareva)	2014	131 turbines	301 MW		
Ksar sghir - HAOUMA wind farm	2014		50,6 MW		
Laaynoune - Foum el oued Farm (owned by Nareva)	2013		50,16 MW	Laâyoune	
Laayoune -Ciment du Maroc Farm	2011		5,16 MW	Laâyoune	
Tanger – Tanger Farm	2009	165 turbines	140 MW		
Tanger – Dhar Sadane Farm	2009	126 turbines	75 MW		
Essaouira – YNNA Bio Power	2009		20 MW	Essaouira	
Tangier – Sendouk Farm	2008		65 MW		
Essaouira – Amogdoul Farm	2007		65 MW	Essaouira	
Tetouan – Lafarge Wind Farm	2005		32 MW		
Tanger-Tetouan (Koudia Al Baida) – Abdelkhalek Torrès Farm	2000	84 turbines	50 MW		

== List of farms under construction ==
Name	Year of creation	Total number of installations	Capacity (MW)	City	Illustration
Laâyoune Farm			240 MW	Laâyoune	
Foum El Oued Farm(owned by Nareva)	2011		200 MW		
Taza – Touahar ()	2015		150 MW		
Tanger – Dar Chaoui	2012	45 turbines	135 MW		
Tanger – YNNA Bio Power	late 2010		50 MW		

== See also ==
- List of power stations in Morocco
- Energy in Morocco
