= Akhfenir Wind Farm =

Wind farm in Morocco

- Country: Morocco
- Location: Akhfenir
- Coordinates: 27°57′24″N 12°00′00″W
- Status: Operational
- Commission date: 2013

Wind farm
- Type: Onshore

Power generation
- Nameplate capacity: 200 MW

Akhfenir Wind Farm is located in 15 km from Akhfenir and 100 km from Tarfaya in Morocco and a has a total installed capacity of 200 MW. It is owned by Nareva, a subsidiary of SNI the holding company Mohammed VI. The first 100MW wind turbines were supplied by Alstom and the contract for the extension of the capacity to 200MW was awarded to General Electric.

== See also ==
- List of wind farms in Morocco
