= Santa Cruz de la Mar Pequeña =

Former Spanish North African colony

Coordinates: 28°3′N 12°13′W

Santa Cruz de la Mar Pequeña (literally Holy Cross of the Little Sea) was a 15th century Spanish settlement close to Akhfennir, in the Tarfaya Province, in Morocco.

== History ==
Founded by the Canary Islands lord Diego de Herrera in 1478 as a trading and fishing post with a fortress. It was located close to a mouth bar (hence its name) across Lanzarote. The importance of the settlement was derived from its position in the trans-Saharan slave trade, and captives were shipped to sugar plantations on the Canary Islands. The Saadi dynasty raided the place and the Spanish eventually left Santa Cruz, being completely abandoned by 1524.

The exact location of what used to be Santa Cruz de la Mar Pequeña was forgotten. After the Treaty Between France and Spain Regarding Morocco (1912), in 1916 the Spanish gained control of the Cape Juby Strip which included the place. It was renamed officially Puerto Cansado, as that was the name given by the Canarian fishermen.

On the other hand, in the mid-nineteenth century, after the Hispano-Moroccan War (1859–1860), the Sultanate of Morocco agreed to hand the place (of uncertain location) to Spain in the 1860 Treaty of Wad Ras. In the wake of the visit of a Spanish delegation to Fez in 1877, a joint Hispano-Moroccan committee was created in order to determine the location of Santa Cruz de la Mar Pequeña. This committee eventually misidentified Santa Cruz de la Mar Pequeña with Ifni, actually located about 240 kilometers north of the real fortress.

The Moroccan sultan accepted the identification in 1883, even if the border delimitation did not take place at the time and the effective Spanish occupation did not take place until 1934.

== Description ==
Located on the north bank of the Naila lagoon in the Khenifiss National Park. The only remains of the 15th century settlement are the foundations of an 8-meter side square fortified tower of Santa Cruz de la Mar Pequeña. In 2011 local archaeologists excavated the Sahara desert's sands in order to identify the tower, which is currently under the sand and called Foum Agoutir.

== See also ==
- Sidi Ifni
- Ifni
