= Antoine de Saint-Exupery Museum =

Antoine de Saint Exupéry Museum
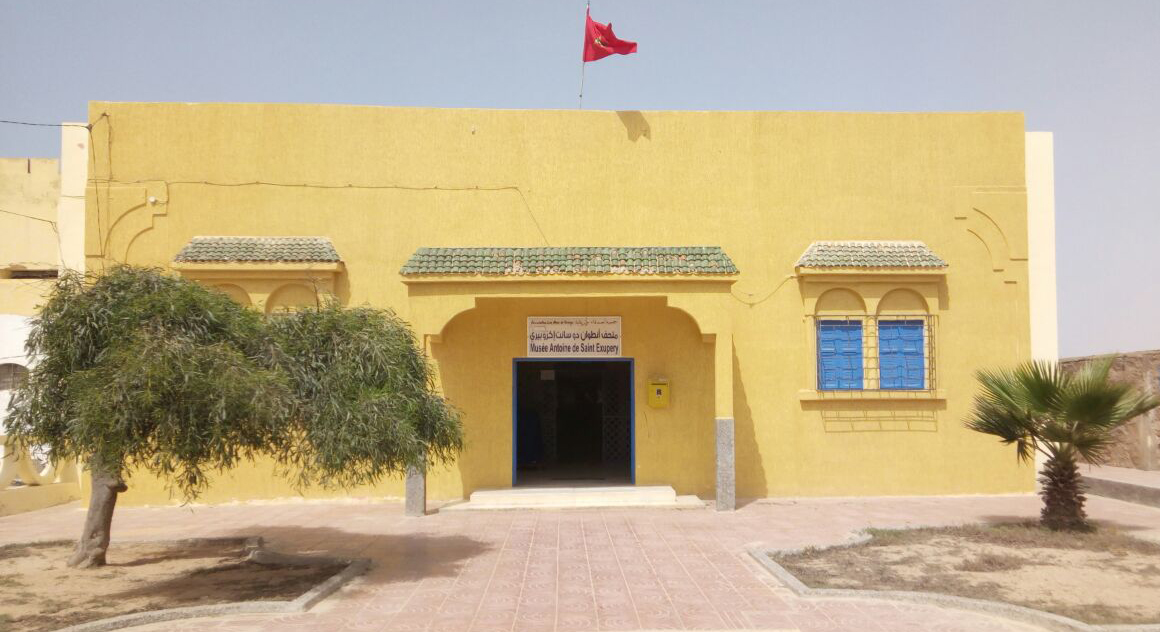
- Antoine de Saint Exupéry Museum
- Established: 2004
- Location: Tarfaya, Morocco
- Coordinates: 27.9439°N 12.9248°W
- Website: www.antoinedesaintexupery.com

The Antoine de Saint Exupéry Museum is a museum of air mail in Tarfaya, Morocco. Founded in 2004, it is devoted to author and aviator Antoine de Saint-Exupéry (1900–1944), who lived there for two years, from 1927 to 1929, and found there the inspiration for much of his literary work.

== History and purpose ==
In 1927, Saint-Exupéry was appointed chief of the stopover airfield in the Tarfaya region, formerly known as Cape Juby. Tarfaya opened the museum in 2004 to recount the history of the aviation company Aéropostale and its route from Toulouse to Saint-Louis, Senegal. The museum is the principal attraction for visitors to the town. The museum places Tarfaya’s aviation history within the wider story of early airmail routes along the Atlantic coast of Africa. Its displays focus on Saint-Exupéry’s time at Cape Juby, the pilots of Aéropostale, and the way the desert setting influenced his later literary work.

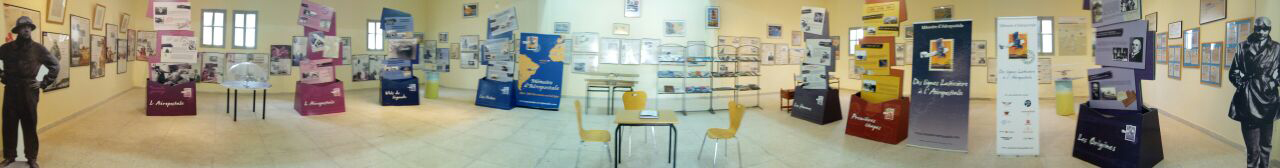
340-degree panorama of the museum interior
