= Postage stamps and postal history of Cape Juby =

Stamp from Rio de Oro with overprint for Cape Juby, issued 1916

Cape Juby is the name of the former southern part of the spanish protectorate of Morocco (1912–1956). Its on the coast of southern Morocco, near its border with Western Sahara, directly east of the Canary Islands.

In 1912, Spain negotiated with France (who controlled the affairs of Morocco at the time) for concessions on the southern edge of Morocco. The final Spanish protectorate included a southern strip centred on Cape Juby. On July 29, 1916, Francisco Bens officially occupied Cape Juby. The location was used as a staging post for airmail flights.

When Morocco became independent in 1956, it asked for the cession of Moroccan areas controlled by Spain. After some resistance and some fighting in 1957 during the Ifni War, Cape Juby was ceded to Morocco in 1958. The region is now also known as the Tarfaya Strip.

== Overprinted stamps ==
Spain issued a large number of overprinted postage stamps for Cape Juby. The first set, in 1916, were surcharges reading CABO JUBI on stamps of Río de Oro. Thereafter overprints read "Cabo Jubi" in various forms, on stamps of Spain from 1919 to 1929, and then on stamps of Spanish Morocco. Overprinted sets of Spanish Moroccan stamps were issued in 1934 through 1940, 1942, 1944, 1946 and 1948.

Most of the issues were printed in larger quantities than the residents of Cape Juby could ever possibly use, were sold to collectors, and are today still quite common, with minimal value. The 1916 issue and the highest values of later issues command prices in the US$50 range.

From 1950, Cape Juby used stamps of Spanish Sahara.
