= Casamar =

Moroccan coastal fort

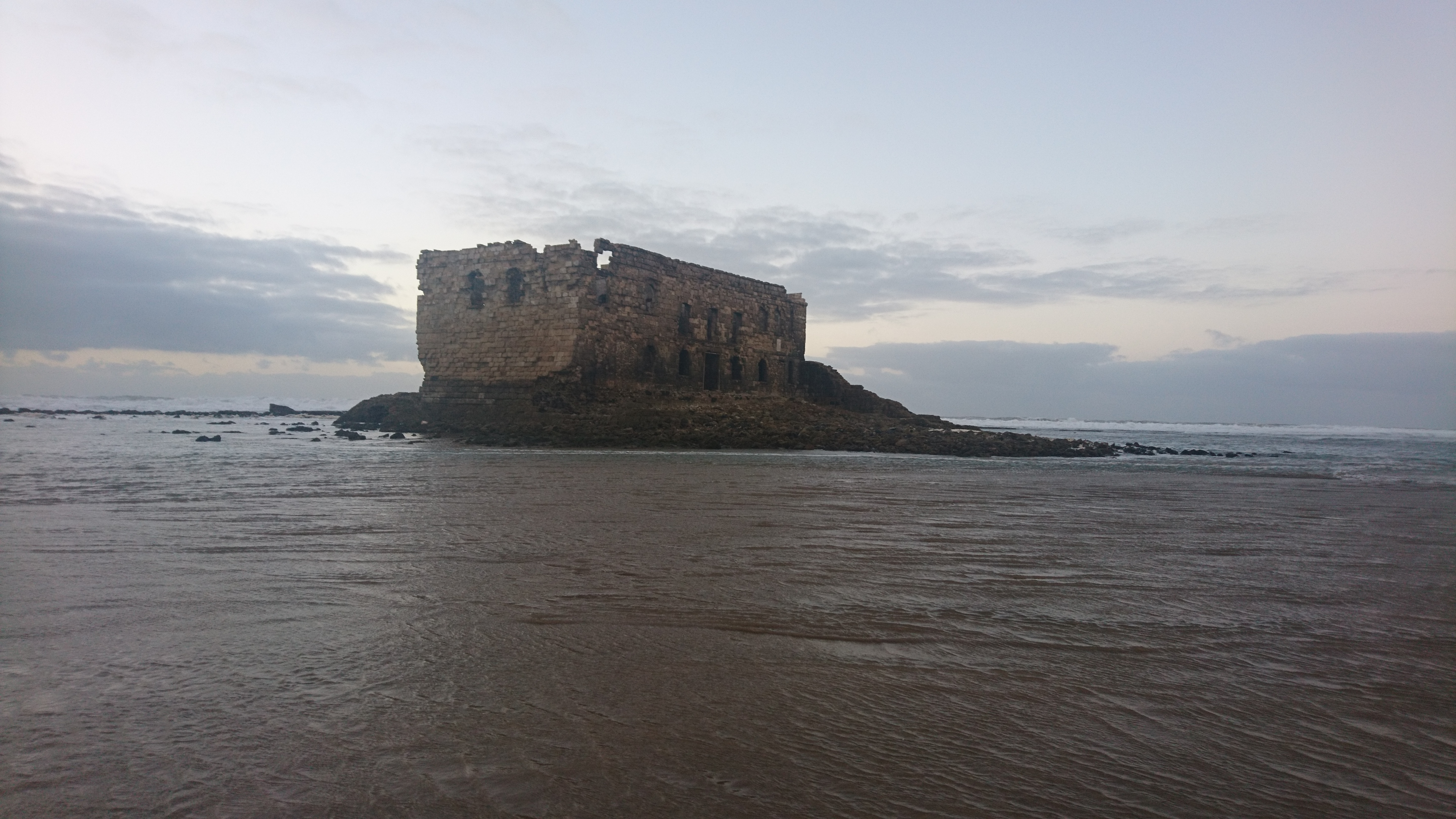
- Port Victoria Fortress
- Interactive map of Casamar
- Location: Tarfaya, Morocco
- Coordinates: 27°56′46″N 12°55′51″W
- Builder: Donald MacKenzie
- Type: Coastal Fortification
- Completion date: 1882
- Dedicated to: Queen Victoria
- Dismantled date: 1895
- Owner: United Kingdom; Morocco (After 1895)

Casamar, also known as Port Victoria and Mackenzie's factory, was a historical coastal fort built in 1882 in Cape Juby near the city of Tarfaya in Morocco, by the founder of the British North West Africa Company, Donald MacKenzie, who positioned there early in 1879 in the goal of trading with commercial caravans coming from Timbuktu and heading to Wadi Noun. Following an attack on the fortress in 1888, the company gave up the building in 1895 to the Sultan of Morocco Moulay Abd al-Aziz, and withdrew from it after the Treaty of Cape Juby.

It was built on a sandy island and consisted of a ground floor comprising eight rooms and an upper floor that also contains eight rooms to store consumables imported and exported from the area towards the English city of Manchester, in addition to six ground tanks for potable water, and a shipping port for docking ships and commercial boats. Fortified it with war cannons to avoid any possible attack by the local Saharan tribes in Cape Juby until the full completion of the project in 1882.

== History ==
In 1879, the British North West Africa Company occupied and took over Tarfaya as part of the Scramble for Africa, and turned it into an exchange center of trade in order to trade with Mohamed Bairouk and commercial caravans coming from Timbuktu and destined to Wadi Noun. In 1882, Mackenzie built a fortress under the name of "Port Victoria". On 26 March 1888, the local Saharan tribes attacked the fortress which resulted in killing and injuring workers. In 1895, after the Treaty of Cape Juby, the company abandoned its final fort and left it to the Sultan of Morocco Moulay Abd al-Aziz, who had just succeeded his father Hassan I, and the British government recognized Moroccan sovereignty over the lands from Draa River to Cape Bojador in Western Sahara. By the year 1916, the Spanish occupation came to the area, and the building would be known as "Casamar" (Spanish: Casa del Mar). In 2014, the Moroccan Ministry of Culture launched a five-year rehabilitation project, at a cost of 60 million dirhams.
