= Hassan I Dam =

Dam in Demnate, Morocco

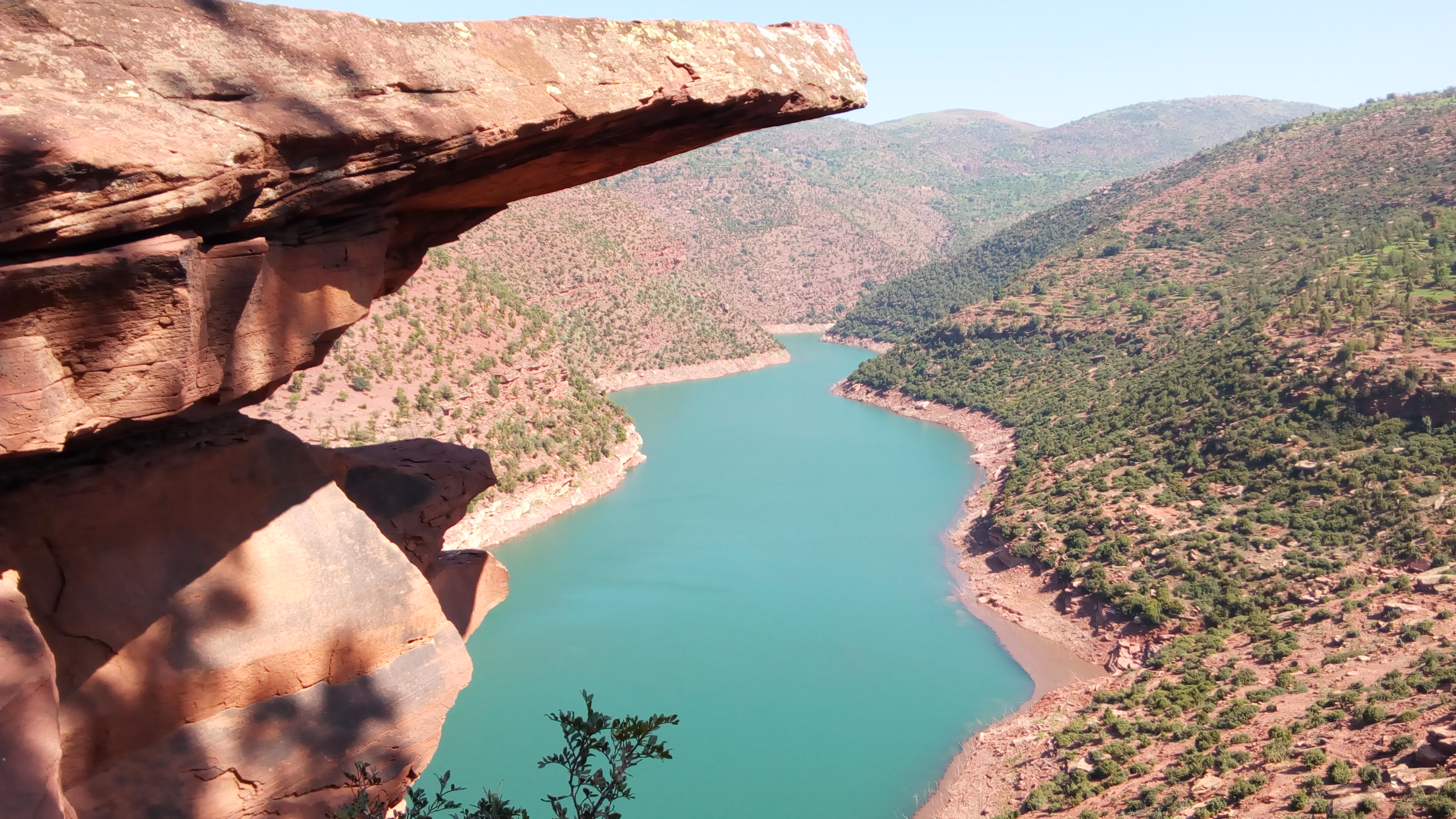
- Interactive map of Hassan I Dam
- Official name: Barrage Hassan I
- Country: Morocco
- Location: Demnate
- Coordinates: 31°48′52″N 06°49′22″W
- Status: Operational
- Opening date: 1986
- Owner: Office National de L'Electricite (ONE)

Dam and spillways
- Type of dam: Embankment
- Impounds: Lakhdar River
- Height: 145 m (476 ft)
- Length: 380 m (1,247 ft)
- Dam volume: 9,000,000 m^{3} (11,771,556 cu yd)

Reservoir
- Total capacity: 273,000,000 m^{3} (221,325 acre⋅ft)
- Catchment area: 1,670 km^{2} (645 sq mi)

Power Station
- Commission date: 1991
- Turbines: 1 x 67.2 MW (90,100 hp) Francis-type
- Installed capacity: 67.2 MW
- Annual generation: 132 GWh (480 TJ)

The Hassan I Dam is an embankment dam located 19 kilometres (12 mi) northeast of Demnate on the Lakhdar River in Azilal Province, Morocco. Completed in 1986, the dam provides water for the irrigation of over 40,000 hectares (99,000 acres) of farmland. The dam's hydroelectric power plant also generates 132 gigawatt-hours (480 TJ) on average annually. At 145 metres (476 ft) in height, it is the tallest dam in Morocco and the tallest earth-fill dam in Africa. The dam is named after Hassan I of Morocco.

== See also ==
- List of power stations in Morocco
