= British North West Africa Company =

British international trading company

- Flag of the United Kingdom
- Industry: Caravan trade
- Predecessor: Morocco
- Founded: 1874; 152 years ago
- Founders: Donald MacKenzie
- Defunct: 1895; 131 years ago
- Fate: Abandoned
- Successor: Morocco
- Headquarters: Port Victoria, Tarfaya
- Area served: Tarfaya
- Owner: United Kingdom

British North West Africa Company was an international trading company, founded by Donald MacKenzie in 1874 after securing bank financing with the guarantee of businessmen from Manchester. Since 1882 It was taken from Port Victoria in Tarfaya as its headquarters for the purpose of dealing with commercial caravans linking Noun River and Timbuktu.

In 1879, the company occupied and took over Tarfaya as part of the Scramble for Africa, and turned it into an exchange center of trade in order to trade with commercial caravans coming from Timbuktu and destined to Wadi Noun. In 1882, Mackenzie built a fortress under the name of "Port Victoria". On 26 March 1888, the local Saharan tribes attacked the fortress which resulted in killing and injuring workers. In 1895, after the Treaty of Cape Juby, the company abandoned its final fort and left it to the sultan of Morocco, Abd al-Aziz, who had just succeeded his father Hassan I.
