= BIOPROSP =

BIOPROSP, or the International Conference on Marine Bioprospecting, is a biennial conference on bioprospecting from cold marine environment that is held in the university town of Tromsø in Northern Norway. BIOPROSP has been organized since 2002 and has already established itself as one of Europe's top conferences in the field of marine bioprospecting. BIOPROSP covers products such as drugs, ingredients, supplements, bioprocessing, energy, green chemicals and biomaterials.

The economical outcome of R&D in marine biotechnology is expected to generate a 10% annual growth, as assessed by Blue Growth H2020. BIOPROSP Conference aims at bringing together scientists and industry representatives and addressing the issue of translating basic research into applied research on possible industrial applications.

== Organization ==
=== Organizers and partners ===
The BIOPROSP conference is organized by MABIT and has been supported throughout the years by Norwegian Ministry of Fisheries and Coastal Affairs, RDA Tromsø, Innovation Norway, The Research Council of Norway, University of Tromsø, NORUT, Norinnova Technology Transfer, SINTEF, Nofima, MabCent-SFI, Arena BioTech North, uniResearch, University of Oslo, University of Bergen, DNB, Tekna, ArcticZymes, and many other important industry actors from the region. The conference program features some of the best-recognized scientists working in the marine bioprospecting field and attracts around 250 participants from all over the world. Participants include stakeholders in biotech (life science) and pharmaceutical industry, scientists, public support system, decision-makers and others interested in marine bioprospecting and biotechnology.

=== Pre-Conference ===
The conference is preceded by a pre-conference workshop consisting of three or four parallel sessions held in small groups with more direct and face-to-face interactions and discussions. As a part of the conference, a PhD course in bioprospecting is offered by University of Tromsø-The Arctic University of Tromsø. The course aims to teach the essential themes related to bioprospecting. The first part of the course is given as weekly online lectures during months preceding the conference. One day before conference, PhD course participants meet for an intensive course day. Students are also obliged to take part in a Pre-conference Workshop mentioned above. After the conference the students have to write a home assignment (exam).

=== Main Conference ===
BIOPROSP conference itself lasts three days and consists of four program sessions devoted to topics that are chosen by Programme Committee. Each session includes one keynote and two presentations by invited speakers.

BIOPROSP conference also hosts the "Poster Session". Posters are displayed from the opening of the conference. Some posters will be selected for short oral presentations during the official Poster Session. In addition to that posters will be evaluated for a "Poster Prize". Posters will be evaluated according to lay-out, relevance of issue and communication skills.

BIOPROSP is designed to serve as a networking arena and thus, there is an accompanying social activities program with dog sledging, Northern Lights watching and music entertainment. All taking place in the incredible surroundings of Northern Norway, during the Northern Lights peak visibility season.

== Past conferences ==
- BIOPROSP 2002, 4 – 5 February 2002, Tromsø, Norway
- BIOPROSP 2004, 13 – 14 October 2004, Tromsø, Norway
- BIOPROSP 2006, 11 – 12 October 2006, Tromsø, Norway
- BIOPROSP 2009, 24 – 26 February 2009, Tromsø, Norway
- BIOPROSP 2011, 23 – 25 February 2011, Tromsø, Norway
- BIOPROSP_13, 20 – 22 February 2013, Tromsø, Norway
- BIOPROSP_15, 18 – 20 February 2015, Tromsø, Norway
- BIOPROSP_17, 8 – 10 March 2017, Tromsø, Norway
- BIOPROSP_19, 25 – 27 February 2019, Tromsø, Norway
- BIOPROSP_21, 9 – 10 March 2021, Virtual meeting
