= Afourer Pumped Storage Station =

Dam in Azilal Province, Morocco

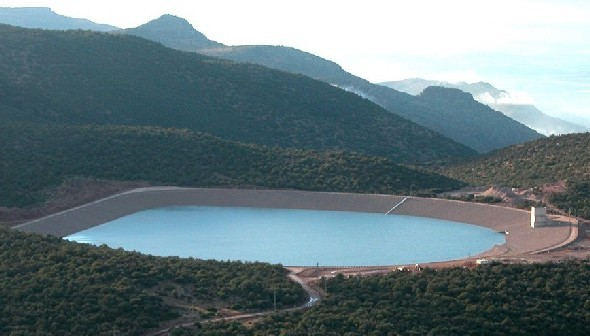
- Upper reservoir
- Interactive map of Afourer Pumped Storage Station
- Country: Morocco
- Location: Afourer
- Coordinates: 32°12′24″N 06°31′51″W
- Status: Operational
- Opening date: 2004
- Construction cost: US$220 million
- Owner: Office National de L'Electricite (ONE)

Upper reservoir
- Creates: Upper Afourer Reservoir
- Total capacity: 1,260,000 m^{3} (1,021 acre⋅ft)

Lower reservoir
- Creates: Lower Afourer Reservoir
- Total capacity: 1,260,000 m^{3} (1,021 acre⋅ft)

Power Station
- Turbines: Step 1: 2 x 172.5 MW; Step 2: 2 x 60 MW reversible Francis turbines
- Installed capacity: 465 MW (624,000 hp)

The Afourer Pumped Storage Station is a pumped storage hydroelectric scheme located in the hills above Afourer of Azilal Province, Morocco. The scheme consists of two power stations with a combined installed capacity of 465 megawatts (624,000 hp). Construction on the project began in 2001 and was complete in 2004. It was funded by the Arab Fund for Economic & Social Development at a cost of US$220 million.

== Design and operation ==
Water for the scheme is derived from the Aït Ouarda Dam on the El Abid River at 32°06′32″N 06°30′34″W, just downstream of the Bin el Ouidane Dam. Water from the dam is pumped up 600 m (1,969 ft) in elevation via Step 1 to the Upper Afourer Reservoir at 32°10′32″N 06°32′02″W which has a capacity of 1,260,000 m^{3} (1,021 acre⋅ft) and lies at an elevation of 1,280 m (4,199 ft) above sea level. Step 1's power and pumping station contains 2 x 172.5 MW reversible Francis turbines. From the upper reservoir, water can be released back to Step 1 for power generation or released 800 m (2,625 ft) down in elevation to the Lower Afourer Reservoir at 32°12′36″N 06°31′01″W which lies at an elevation of 480 m (1,575 ft) and also has a capacity of 1,260,000 m^{3} (1,021 acre⋅ft). The power station at the lower reservoir, Step 2, contains 2 x 60 megawatts (80,000 hp) reversible Francis turbines From the lower reservoir, water can be pumped back into the upper reservoir or released into a canal near Afourer for use in irrigation.

== See also ==
- List of power stations in Morocco
