= Allal al Fassi Dam =

Dam in Sefrou, Morocco

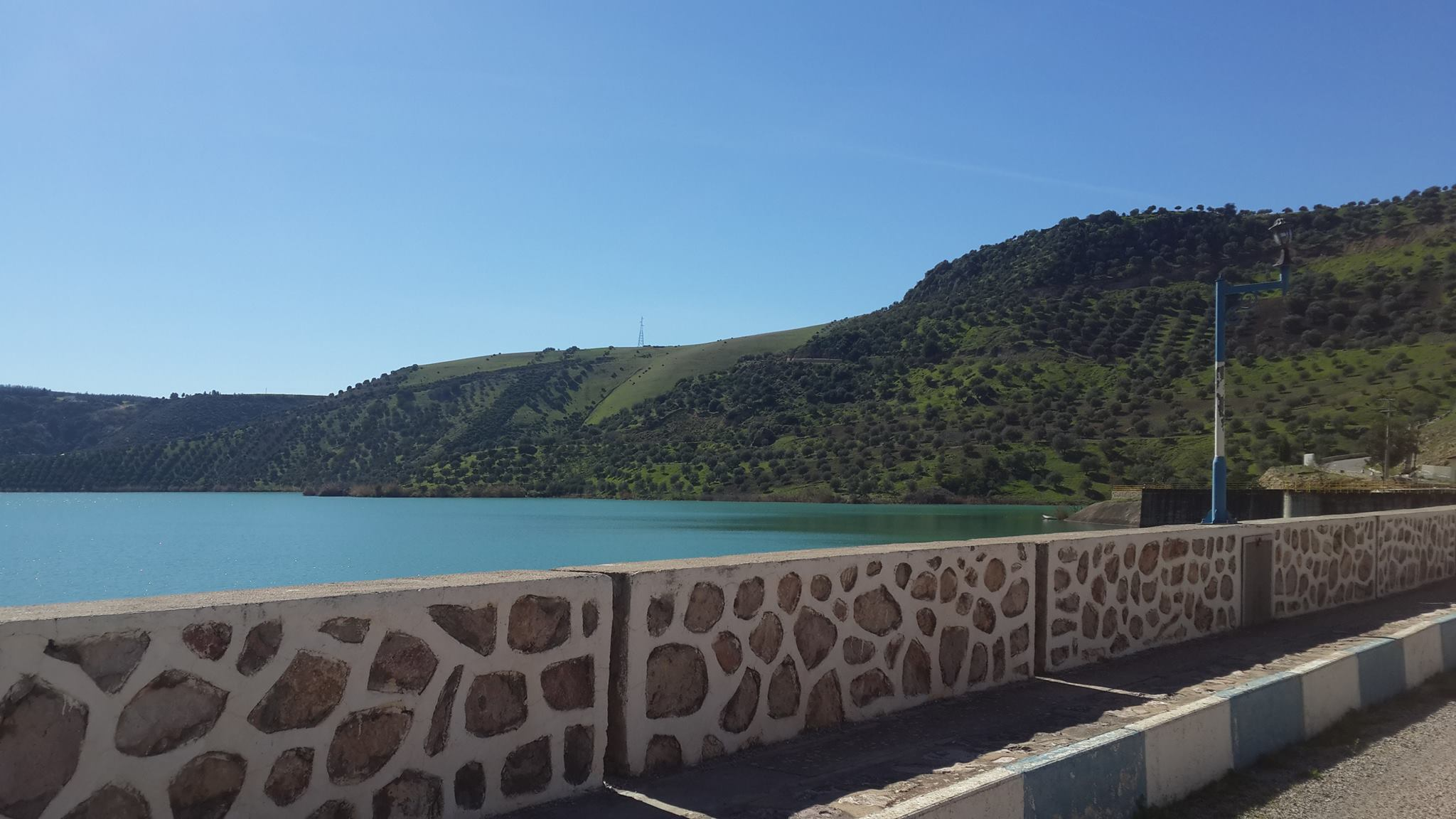
- Interactive map of Allal al Fassi Dam
- Official name: Barrage Allal al Fassi
- Country: Morocco
- Location: Sefrou Province
- Coordinates: 33°55′53″N 04°40′38″W
- Status: Operational
- Opening date: 1991
- Owner: Office National de L'Electricite (ONE)

Dam and spillways
- Type of dam: Embankment
- Impounds: Sebou River
- Height: 61 m (200 ft)
- Length: 340 m (1,120 ft)
- Dam volume: 1,300,000 m^{3} (46,000,000 cu ft)

Reservoir
- Total capacity: 81.5×10^{6} m^{3} (66,100 acre⋅ft)
- Catchment area: 5,400 km^{2} (2,100 sq mi)

Allal al Fassi Power Plant
- Coordinates: 34°05′43″N 04°37′13″W
- Commission date: 1994
- Turbines: 3 x 80 MW (110,000 hp) Francis-type
- Installed capacity: 240 MW (320,000 hp)
- Annual generation: 220 GWh (790 TJ)

The Allal al Fassi Dam is an embankment dam located 18 kilometres (11 mi) northeast of Sefrou on the Sebou River in the Fès-Meknès region of Morocco. Completed in 1991, it provides water for irrigation and hydroelectric power production. The dam was named after the famous Moroccan Allal al-Fassi.

== Power station ==
The dam's hydroelectric power station is located 18 kilometres (11 mi) to the north on the southern bank of the Idriss I Dam's reservoir. Water reaches the power plant after being diverted by the Allal al Fassi Dam via an intake on the right bank of the reservoir. It flows through a 15.45 kilometres (9.60 mi) long tunnel before reaching a compensating basin. From the basin, water is sent through pipelines and finally penstocks to 3 x 80 megawatts (110,000 hp) Francis turbine-generators. Once used for power generation, the water is discharged into the Idriss I Reservoir. About 300 million cubic metres (240,000 acre⋅ft) of water is transferred through the power station annually. The power station was commissioned in 1994 and generates 220 gigawatt-hours (790 TJ) on average annually.

== See also ==
- List of power stations in Morocco
