= Sebkha Tah =

Sabkha in Morocco

Coordinates: 27.713°N 12.777°W

- Interactive map of Sebkha Tah

Location of Sebkha Tah

Sebkha Tah, also named as Sabkhat Tah, Sebja Tah or Sebjet Tah, is a sabkha in southern Morocco. At 55 metres below sea level it is the lowest point of the country. It is located close to Atlantic Ocean and the border with Western Sahara. The main city in the area is Tarfaya.

== Project of power plant ==
A project plans to combine the high wind potential of the Tarfaya region and the difference in level between the ocean and the sebkha to produce electrical energy on demand. The water drained from the ocean would feed hydraulic turbines before reaching the Sebkha Tah 55 meters below. Part of the energy produced by wind turbines, when available, would be used to power pumps returning the water stored in the basin to the ocean. The power plant would have an installed capacity of 500 MW.
