= Children's Care International =

Children's Care International / Aide Internationale Pour l'Enfance (AIPE-CCI) is a non-profit organization founded in 2000. Its mission is to open rehabilitation centres throughout developing countries in Asia, Africa, and Latin America, to aid children who are victims of sex tourism, slavery, and all other forms of exploitation.

The organisation, based in Montreal, Canada, receives its funding from various sponsors, and depends largely on the invaluable support provided by its partners, namely ARDAR, OXFAM, and Amnesty International Children's Rights and many others.

In June 2003, Children's Care International opened the Rainbow Centre in Andhra Pradesh, India, in collaboration with ARDAR, a local NGO, to help free children from slavery. The Centre is currently home to 60 children. Oxfam and ActionAid are amongst the partners helping the center.

Children's Care International has begun creating partnerships with companies (manufacturers, wholesalers, retailers, craftsmen, and artists) that produce and sell fairtrade products. Some of the partners include Vertimonde who provide environmentally friendly and fair trade jute grocery bags, and EcoHosting, a socially responsible web hosting and web development company that is pledging to donate 20% of its hosting revenues to its clients' favorite charities.
