= Aït Oussa =

The Aït Oussa (Arabic: أيت اوسا), is a large Adnani and Qahtani Arab tribe in Western Sahara and Morocco, the members of Ait Oussa are Sahrawis, descended from Banu Hilal and Banu Aws. Muhammed Sulayman Al-Tayeb classifies Ait Oussa as an Arab tribe.

Al-Mukhtar Al-Sussi said regarding its origins:

"The Arab Hilali tribe living there, now known as Ait Oussa, is a great tribe with famous chiefs.” They are a branch of the Tekna tribes which contains Arab tribes and Berber tribes.

Muhammed Sulayman Al-Tayeb when discussing the Arab tribes in the Tekna tribe, said:

"It is one of the major Arab tribes in the Maghreb...The Takna tribe is divided into tribes, Al-Zarqiyun, Ait Lahsan, Ait Jamel, Ait Oussa, Al-Ayuqut, Ait Ibrahim, Ait Masoud, Ait Hamou, Ait Said, Labidat."

The tribe consists of 50,000 members. The Aït Oussa tribes speak Hassaniya Arabic, and are Muslims, mainly belonging to the Maliki school of Sunni Islam.

Some attribute this tribe to the Ansar, known as Banu Aws. Hassan ibn Abdullah Afshil said:

"Ait Oussa is a tribe of the Ansar, originally descended from migrants from the Arabian Peninsula, specifically from Medina. Their ancestors include three main lineages: Musa al-Ansari, Yaqub al-Ansari, and Al-Asoudi. They arrived in the region in the 12th and 13th centuries."

The genealogist Muhammed bin Al-Tayeb Al-Bouchihi said: "This tribe consists of several clans, some of which have different lineages. Some of its clans are Hilali Qays, others are Oussi Ansari, others are from Maqil"

In the absence of written local documents, oral tradition remains the only source for the (confirmation) origins (of Banu Aws) of the Ait Oussa tribe.

However according to the Algerian Scientific study on Ait Oussa, it states the original members of the Ait Oussa were the Arabs from the Ansar:

"Narratives of Origins: The first reference that reaches us regarding the beginnings of the formation of the Ait Oussa tribe comes from the factions of "Ali" and "Anfalys," and part of "Idawtī" and "Ait Idr." This "founding nucleus," from which the tribe originated, connects these factions to the residents of Yathrib (the city of Medina) through the narratives of "Musa al-Anṣār" and "Yaqub al-Anṣār." A scribe mentions that "Ait Oussa came here [to this place] during the time of Abdul Malik ibn Marwan, one of the caliphs of the Umayyads, and that Musa ibn Nusayr is of Ait Oussa, from whom 'Anfalys' and Sayyid Yaqub descended."'
