= Khenifiss National Park =

National park in Morocco

- IUCN category II (national park)
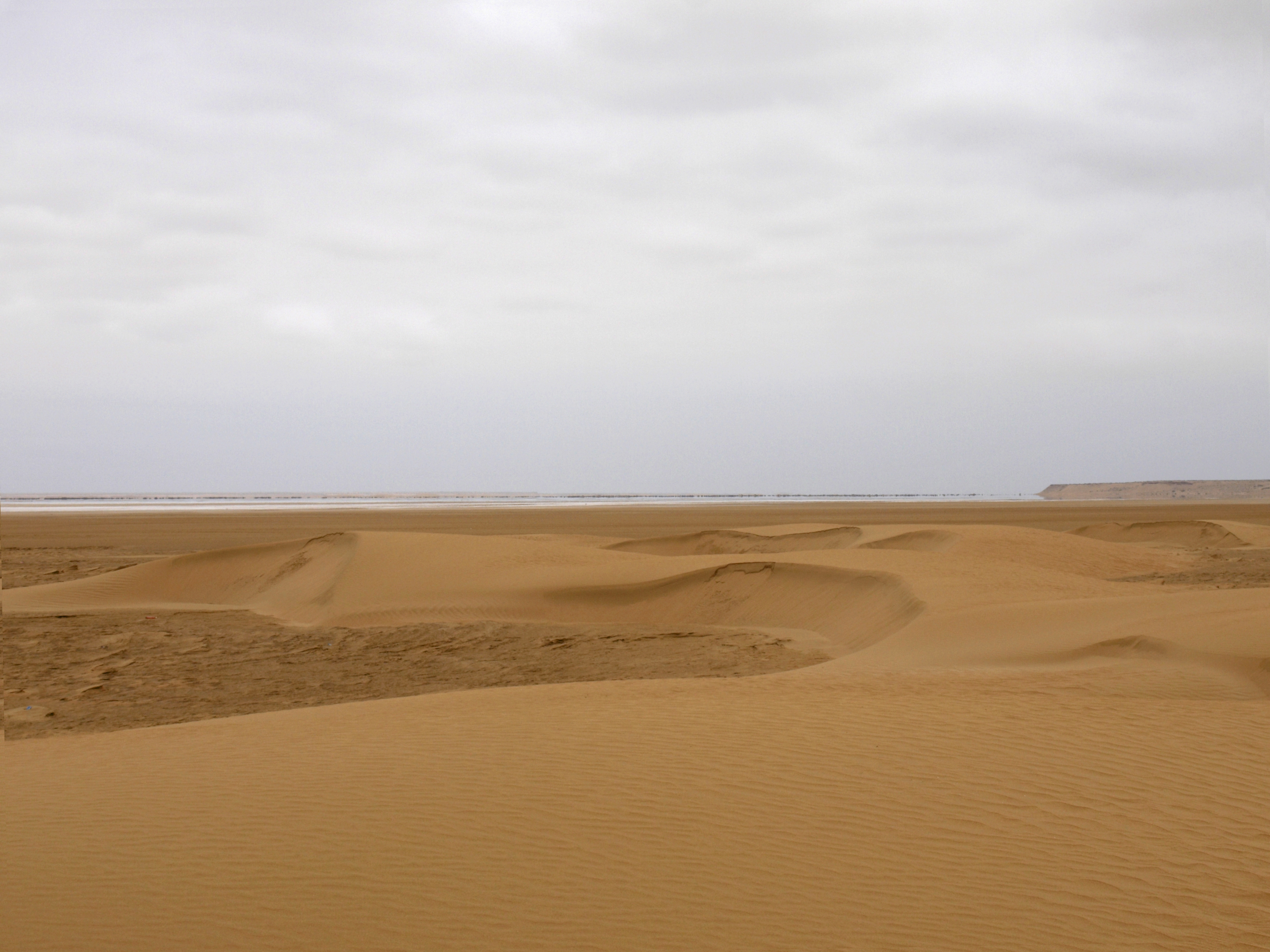
- Sand dunes in the park, with the Atlantic Ocean in the background

- Location within Morocco
- Location: Morocco
- Nearest city: Tan-Tan, Tarfaya
- Coordinates: 27°56′N 12°20′W
- Area: 1,850 square kilometres (710 mi^{2})
- Established: September 26, 2006

Ramsar Wetland
- Official name: Baie de Khnifiss
- Designated: 20 June 1980
- Reference no.: 209

Khenifiss National Park (French: Le Parc National Khenifiss) is a national park in the south-west of Morocco, located near Akhfenir on the Atlantic coast in the region of Laâyoune-Sakia El Hamra. Established in 2006, the park was created to protect desert, wetland and coastal dune landscapes. The government has declared its intention to turn the park into a major tourist attraction specialising in ecotourism.

== Geography ==
The park, with an area of 1,850 km^{2} (710 mi^{2}), lies on the coast of the Atlantic Ocean, north of the border with Western Sahara, between the towns of Tan-Tan to the north and Tarfaya to the south. National Route 1, which runs along the Atlantic coast of Morocco, passes through the park. The coastal section comprises the Khenfiss lagoon, the largest lagoon on the Moroccan coast. An inland, desert, section includes sabkhas, dunes and limestone plateaus, and is typical of Sahara landscapes.

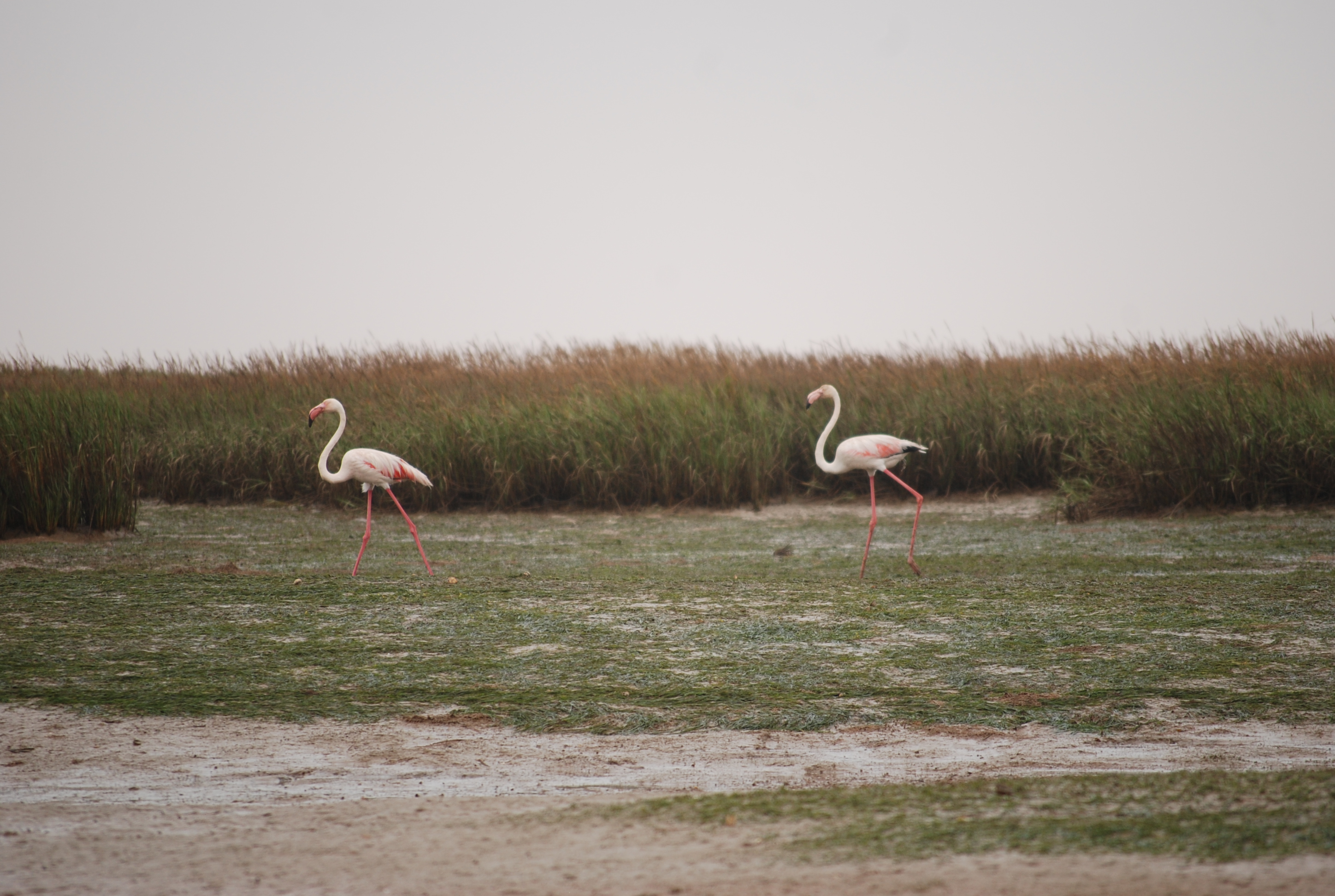
Flamingos in the park

=== Environment ===
The lagoon is an important bird breeding ground. Ruddy shelducks, marbled ducks and Audouin's gulls inhabit the lagoon permanently, and many species migrate here in winter. Every year, about 20,000 birds stay in the lagoon area in the winter season. The site has also been designated an Important Bird Area (IBA) by BirdLife International because it supports significant wintering populations of waterbirds.

== History ==
The park was first created as a natural reserve in 1960. In 1980 it was classified as a wetland of international importance. In 1983, the natural reserve was transformed into a Permanent Biological Reserve. The site was added to the UNESCO World Heritage Tentative List on 12 October 1998 in the "natural" category. On 26 September 2006, the national park was created.
