= Afourar =

Afourar ⴰⴼⵓⵔⴰⵔ • افورار Afourer
- Town
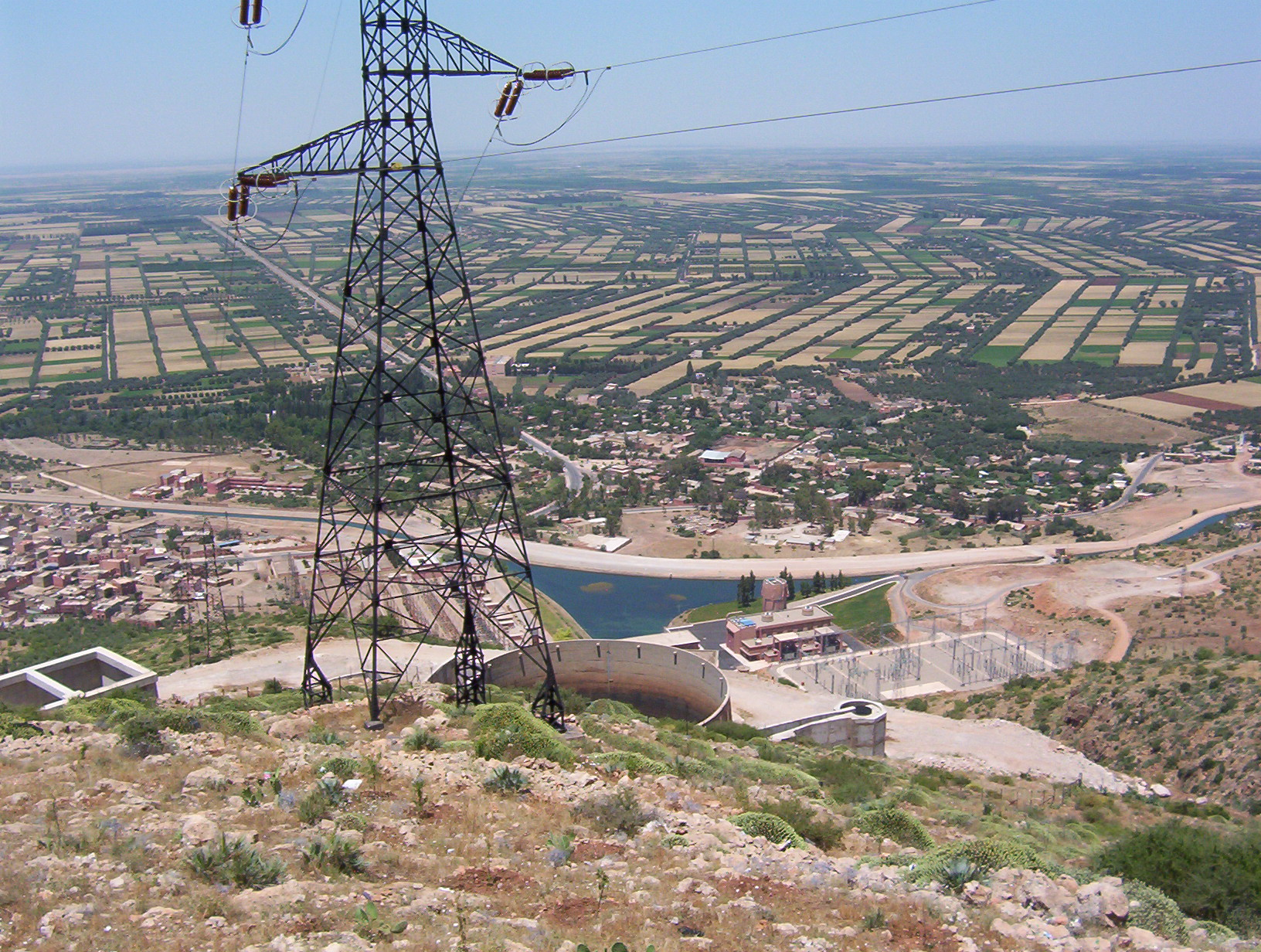
- Interactive map of Afourar
- Coordinates: 32°13′N 6°32′W
- Country: Morocco
- Region: Béni Mellal-Khénifra
- Province: Azilal Province

Population (2004)
  - Total: 11,898
- Time zone: UTC+0 (GMT)

Afourar is a town in Azilal Province, Béni Mellal-Khénifra, Morocco. According to the 2004 census it has a population of 11,898.

== See also ==
- Afourer Pumped Storage Station
