= Nareva =

Moroccan energy company

- Company type: Private
- Industry: Energy, renewable energy
- Founded: 2004; 22 years ago
- Headquarters: Casablanca, Morocco
- Key people: Aymane Taud (chairman)
- Owner: Al Mada (100%)
- Website: nareva.ma

Nareva is a Moroccan energy company based in Casablanca. The company develops, owns and operates electricity generation projects in Morocco and Africa, with activities in wind power, solar power and conventional thermal generation, as well as desalination.

Nareva is a subsidiary of Al Mada, a Moroccan investment holding company. In the 2020s, the company became involved in projects and agreements related to green hydrogen and associated fuels, in the context of Morocco’s national energy and decarbonisation strategies.

== Activities ==
=== Renewables ===
Nareva develops and operates renewable electricity generation projects in Morocco. The company has developed several onshore wind farms, including facilities in Akhenfir, Haouma and Foum El Oued, with installed capacities of 100 MW, 50 MW and 50 MW respectively. Electricity from these installations is supplied to industrial consumers under direct power purchase agreements.

Nareva is also involved in the Tarfaya Wind Farm project (300 MW), which sells its output to the ONEE under a long-term power purchase agreement. The project is operated through TAREC (Tarfaya Energy Company), a project company jointly owned with GDF Suez (Engie).

In addition to wind energy, the company has developed and participated in solar power projects, including photovoltaic installations intended for electricity supply to industrial sites.

=== Conventional power ===
In addition to renewable energy, Nareva is involved in conventional thermal power generation projects in Morocco. These activities include the development and operation of power plants supplying electricity under long-term contracts or through direct supply arrangements with industrial consumers.

=== Water and desalination ===
Nareva is involved in water infrastructure projects, including desalination plants, primarily linked to the supply of industrial sites and urban areas in regions facing water scarcity. These projects are developed in coordination with public authorities and other private partners.

=== Hydrogen ===
From the 2020s, Nareva has taken part in projects and agreements related to green hydrogen and derivative fuels. These initiatives focus on feasibility studies, pilot projects and the assessment of hydrogen production based on renewable electricity within the Moroccan context.

== See also ==
- Desertec
- TAQA
