= Akhfennir =

- Town
- Location within Morocco Location within Africa
- Coordinates: 28°05′43″N 12°02′54″W
- Country: Morocco
- Region: Laâyoune-Sakia El Hamra
- Province: Tarfaya Province

Population (2004)
  - Total: 1,583
- Time zone: UTC+0 (GMT)

Akhfennir is a small town in Tarfaya Province, in the Laâyoune-Sakia El Hamra region of Morocco. The area is noted for Khenifiss National Park and Tarfaya-Akhfenir Wind Farm as well as the nearby former Spanish colony of Santa Cruz de la Mar Pequeña.

== Climate and Weather Condition in Akhfennir ==
In Akhfennir, the summer seasons are warm, muggy, and arid; the winter seasons are short, cool, and dry; and it is windy and mostly clear year round. Over the year, the temperature typically changes from 55 °F to 81 °F and is rarely below 51 °F or above 89 °F.

Rainfall

The rainy period starts from November 18 to March 1, and lasts for 3.5 months of the year, with a sliding 31-day rainfall of at least 0.5 inches. The month with the highest rain in Akhfennir is February, with an average rainfall of 0.6 inches.

The rainless period of the year lasts for 8.6 months, from March 1 to November 18. The month with the least rain in Akhfennir is June, with an average rainfall of 0.0 inches.

Average temperature

The warm season lasts for 3.5 months, from July 12 to October 28, with an average daily high temperature above 79 °F. The hottest month of the year in Akhfennir is August, with an average high of 81 °F and low of 69 °F.

The cool season lasts for 2.4 months, from December 12 to February 25, with an average daily high temperature below 72 °F. The coldest month of the year in Akhfennir is January, with an average low of 56 °F and high of 70 °F.

Cloud

In Akhfennir, the percentage of the sky covered by cloud experiences change over the year.

The clearer part of the year in Akhfennir begins around May 29 and lasts for 3.4 months, ending around September 9.

The clearest month of the year in Akhfennir is July, during this period, which on average the sky is clear, mostly clear, or partly cloudy 97% of the time.

From September 9 to May 29 is the cloudier part of the year and lasts for 8.6 months.

November is the cloudiest month of the year in Akhfennir, during which on average the sky is overcast or mostly cloudy 35% of the time.

Precipitation

Among wet days, there is a difference between those that experience rain alone, snow alone, or a mixture of the two. The month with the most days of rain alone in Akhfennir is November, with an average of 2.0 days. Based on this categorization, the most common form of precipitation throughout the year is rain alone, with a peak probability of 8% on November 24.
