= Tarfaya Wind Farm =

Wind farm in Morocco

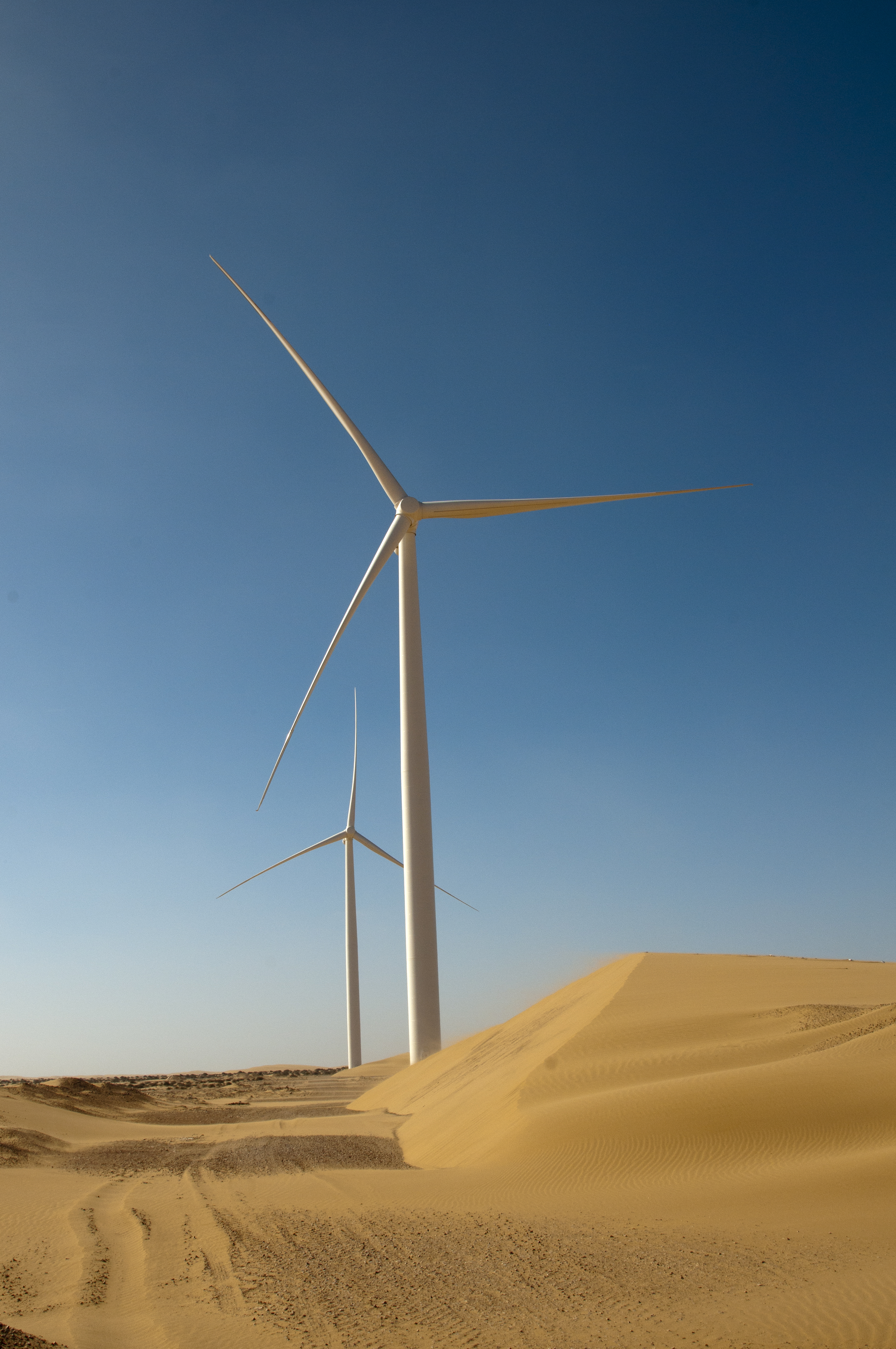
- Country: Morocco
- Location: Tarfaya
- Coordinates: 27°57′24″N 12°0′0″W
- Status: Operational
- Construction began: January 2013
- Commission date: 2014
- Construction cost: >US$560 million
- Operator: Nareva

Thermal power station
- Primary fuel: Wind power

Wind farm
- Type: Onshore

Power generation
- Units operational: 131
- Nameplate capacity: 301 MW

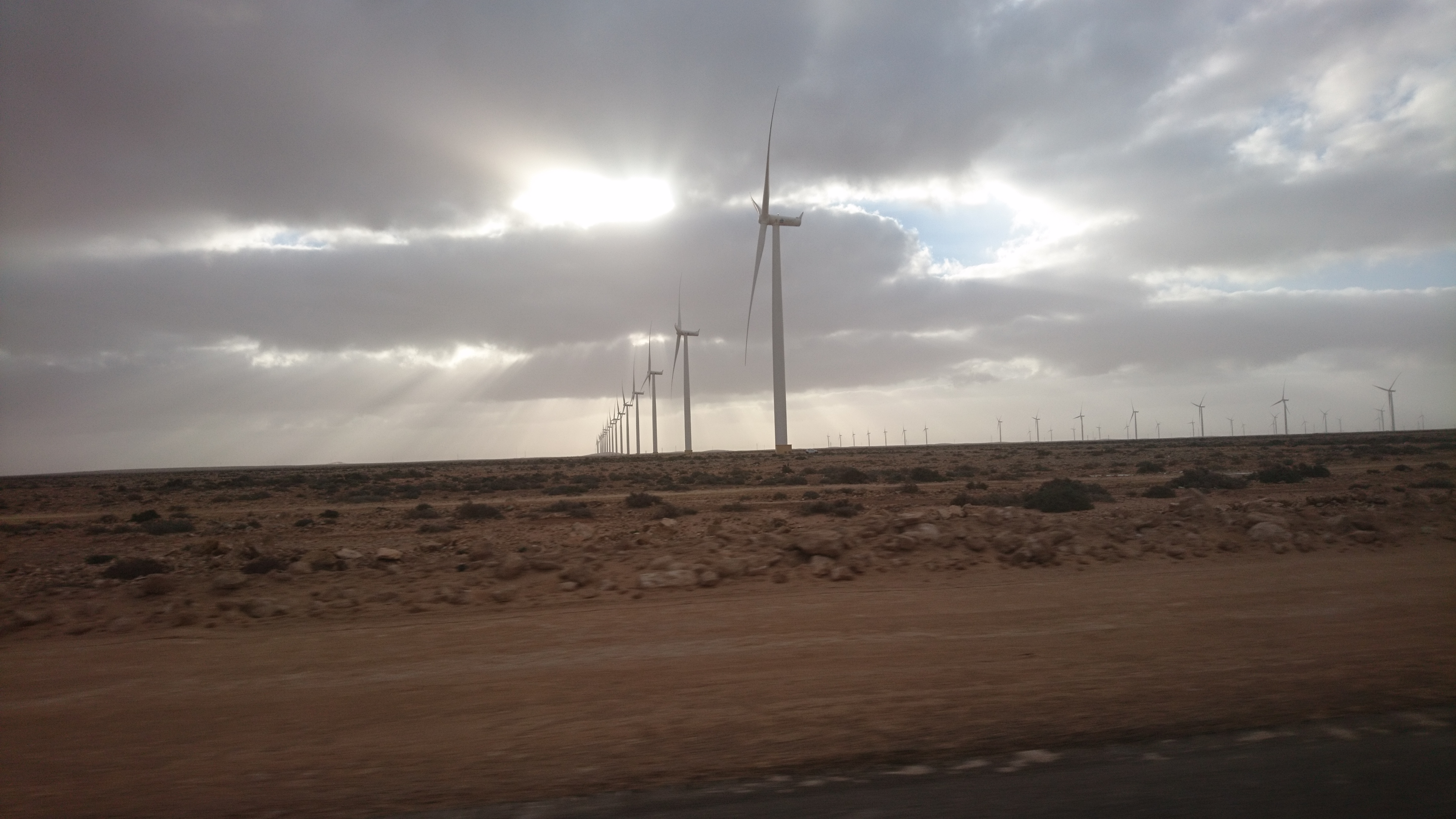
Tarfaya wind farm in 2019

Tarfaya Wind Farm is a wind farm in Morocco, located 20 km from Tarfaya. It was developed by Tarec (Tarfaya Energy Company), a 50/50 joint venture of Nareva Holding and International Power Ltd. Tarfaya Wind Farm is owned and operated by a 50:50 joint venture between the ENGIE and Nareva Holding and it is Africa's 2nd largest capacity wind farm after Lake Turkana Wind Power Station, with 131 wind turbines, each generating 2.3 Megawatts of power, and a total installed capacity of 301 MW. It was on the list of ten “Most Outstanding African Projects in 2015”, a ranking by Jeune Afrique magazine. The park was commissioned in December 2014 after two years of work and investment of 5 billion dirhams. Its constructor and operator is Tarec, which sells the power generated to the National Electricity Office.

== See also ==
- List of wind farms in Morocco
