= Donald Mackenzie (trader) =

Scottish trader

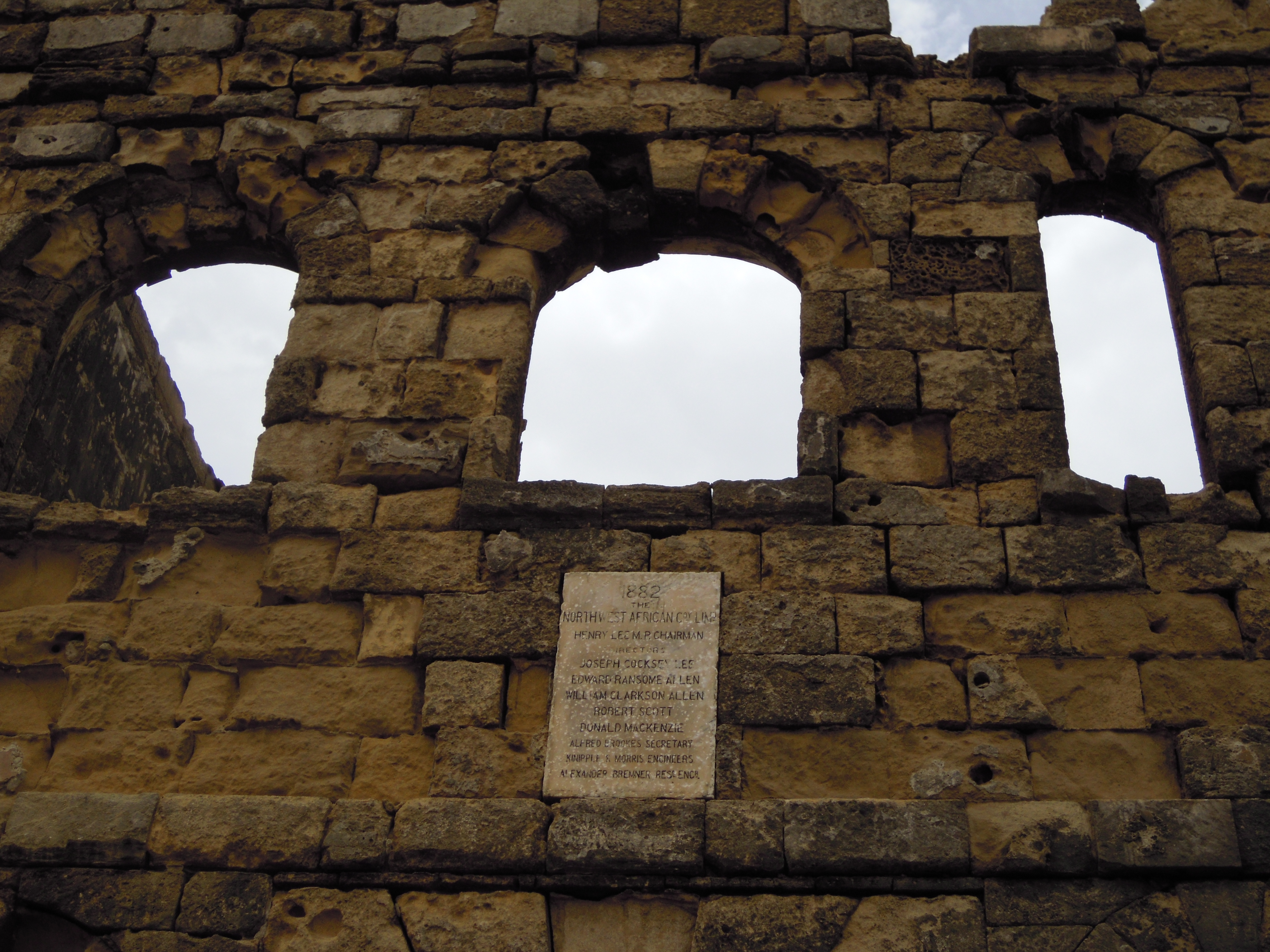
Mackenzie's fort with a plaque bearing his name and the year "1882"

Donald Mackenzie (born c. 1840) was a Scottish abolitionist, writer, and trader who founded the trading post at Tarfaya. In the 1870s, he founded the North-West Africa Trade Company and a Canarian tea trading agency, the latter of which supplied green tea to the Sahrawis. In the late 1870s and early 1880s, he acquired land at Tarfaya and built a trading post there in the form of a sea fort. The trading post saw difficulties during the Sous Expeditions, and Mackenzie was pushed out of the region in 1886. He sold this failing fort in 1895. According to Mackenzie himself, he sold the rights to the fort for £50,000.

Mackenzie authored The Khalifate of the West: Being a General Description of Morocco (1911) and Flooding of the Sahara (1877). His 1877 work was a proposal to build waterways in the Sahara to facilitate trade. According to Edwin Emery Slosson, this proposal grew weak when land elevation in the Sahara was shown to be higher than expected. A review in The Geographical Journal called the 1911 work most valuable for its history of the Cape Juby settlement. Mackenzie also authored reports for the British and Foreign Anti-Slavery Society in 1886 and, as Special Commissioner, 1895. According to Dr. Henry Theodore Hodgkin, Mackenzie's 1895 report catalyzed the official abolition of slavery in Zanzibar in 1897.

== Works ==
=== Books ===
- The Flooding of the Sahara, the Plan for Opening Central Africa to Commerce (London, 1877)
- The Khalifate of the West: Being a General Description of Morocco (London, 1911)

=== Reports ===
- A Report on the Condition of the Empire of Morocco Addressed to the Right Hon. the Earl of Iddesleigh, G.C.M.G., Her Majesty's Principal Secretary of State for Foreign Affairs, &c (London, 1886)
- A Report on Slavery and the Slave Trade in Zanzibar, Pemba, and the Mainland of the British Protectorates of East Africa . British and Foreign Anti-Slavery Society. 1895 – via Wikisource.

=== Articles ===
- "The British Settlement at Cape Juby, North West Africa" (Blackwood's Edinburgh Magazine, 1889)

== See also ==
- List of Scottish businesspersons
- Sahara Sea
