= Noun River (Morocco) =

River in Morocco

Coordinates: 29°9′N 10°2.5′W

Noun River Assaka river
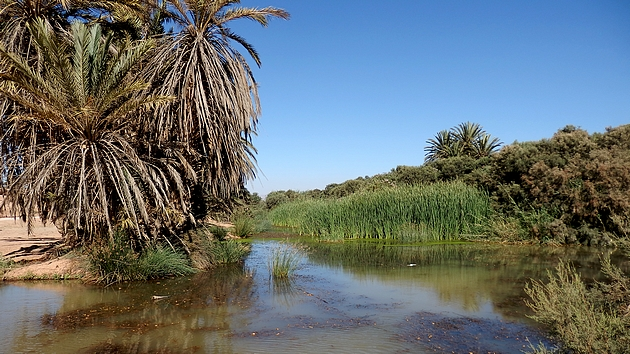
- The oasis of Tighmert

Location
- Country: Morocco

Physical characteristics
- Source
  - location: Anti-Atlas
- Mouth
  - location: Atlantic Ocean

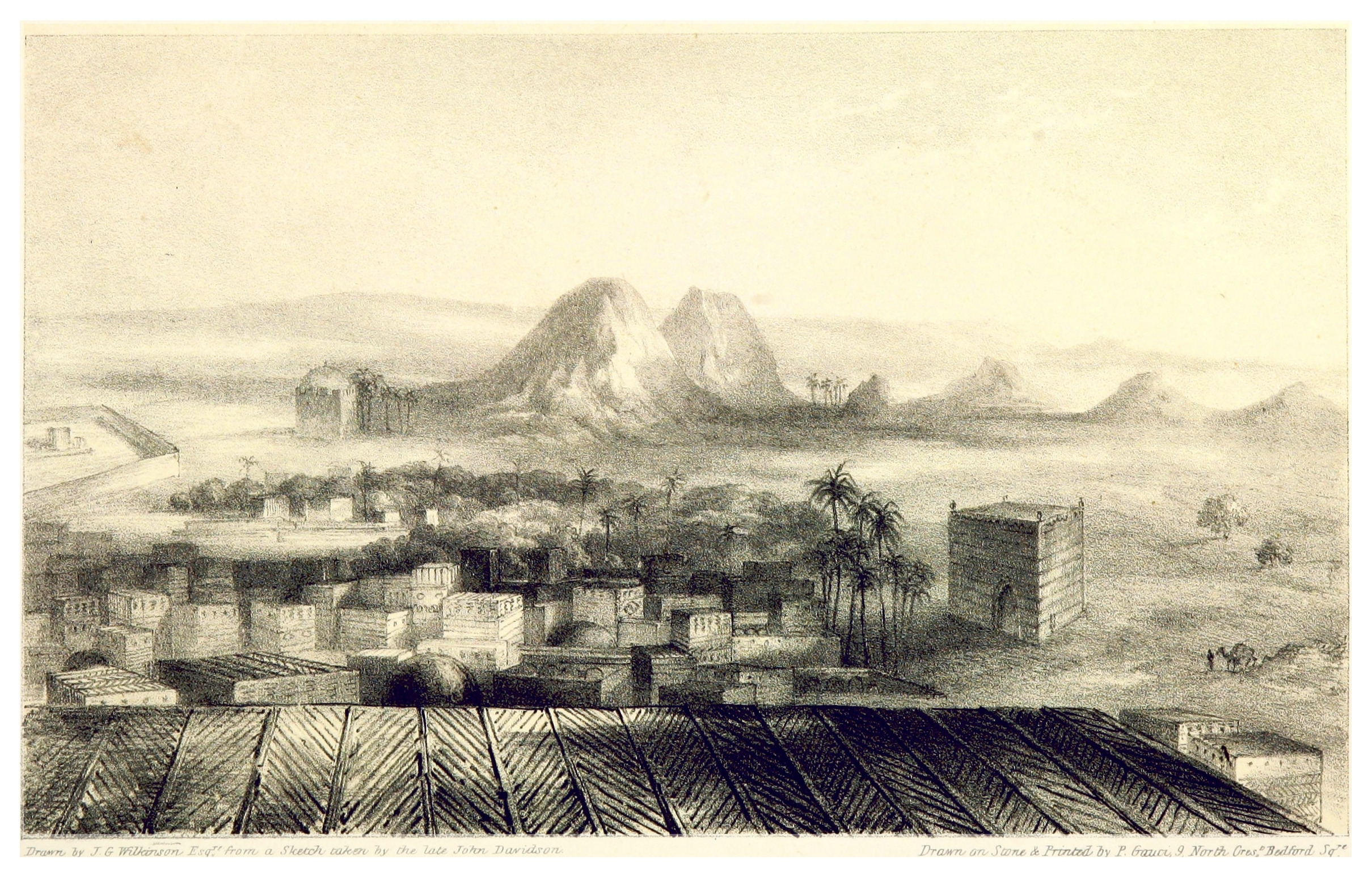
Wadnoon or Wadi Noun (1837) at the Noun River

The Noun River or Wad Noun (Arabic: واد نون, romanized: Wād Nūn; Berber languages: ⴰⵙⵉⴼ ⵏ ⵏⵓⵏ, romanized: Asif n Nun) is a river in Morocco and the southernmost permanent watercourse in the country. It is located 70 km north of the Draa River and flows southwest originating in the Anti-Atlas, passing south of Guelmim and meeting the Atlantic Ocean at Foum Asaca in the region of Sbouya.

== See also ==
- Guelmim
- Sidi Ifni
- Ifrane Atlas-Saghir
- Draa River
