= Tarfaya =

Tarfaya طرفاية ⵟⵔⴼⴰⵢⴰ
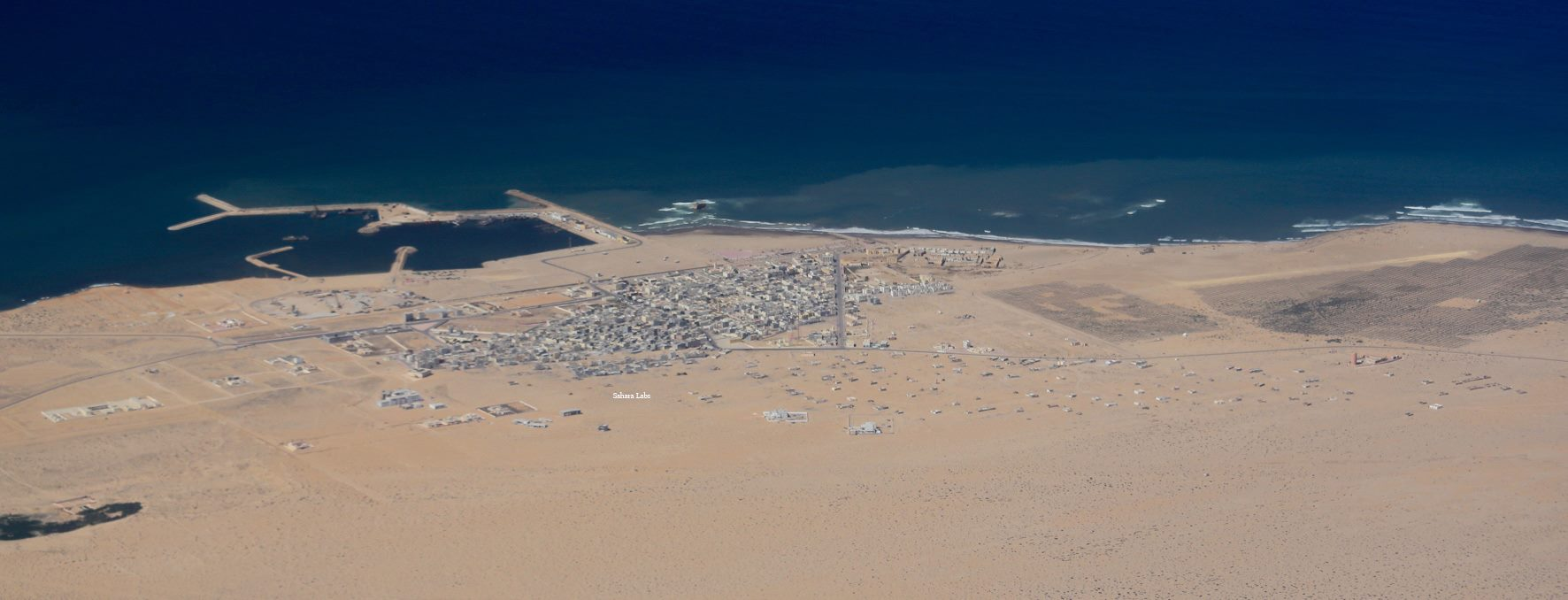
- Aerial view of Tarfaya

- Location in Morocco, as shown at bottom left. Tarfaya (Africa)
- Coordinates: 27°56′22″N 12°55′34″W
- Country: Morocco
- Region: Laâyoune-Sakia El Hamra
- Province: Tarfaya Province

Population (2014)
  - Total: 8,027
- Time zone: UTC+0 (GMT)
- Postal code: 70050

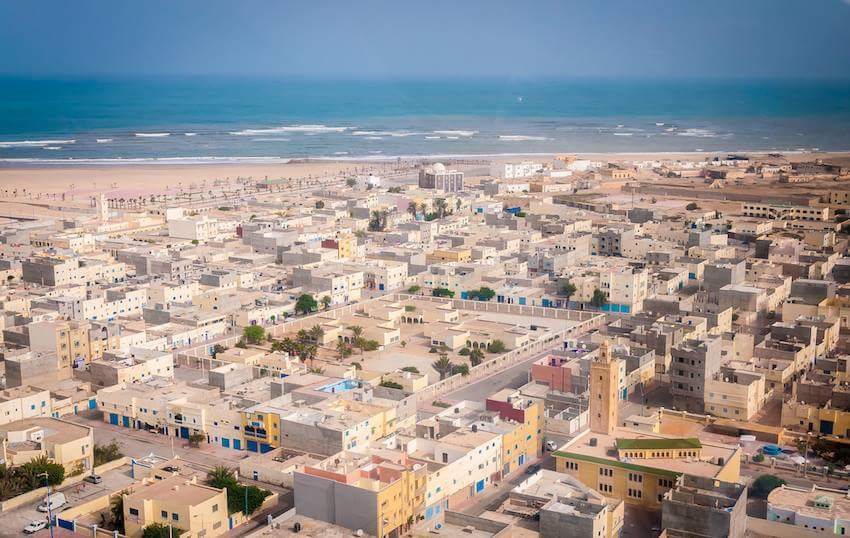
The town of Tarfaya

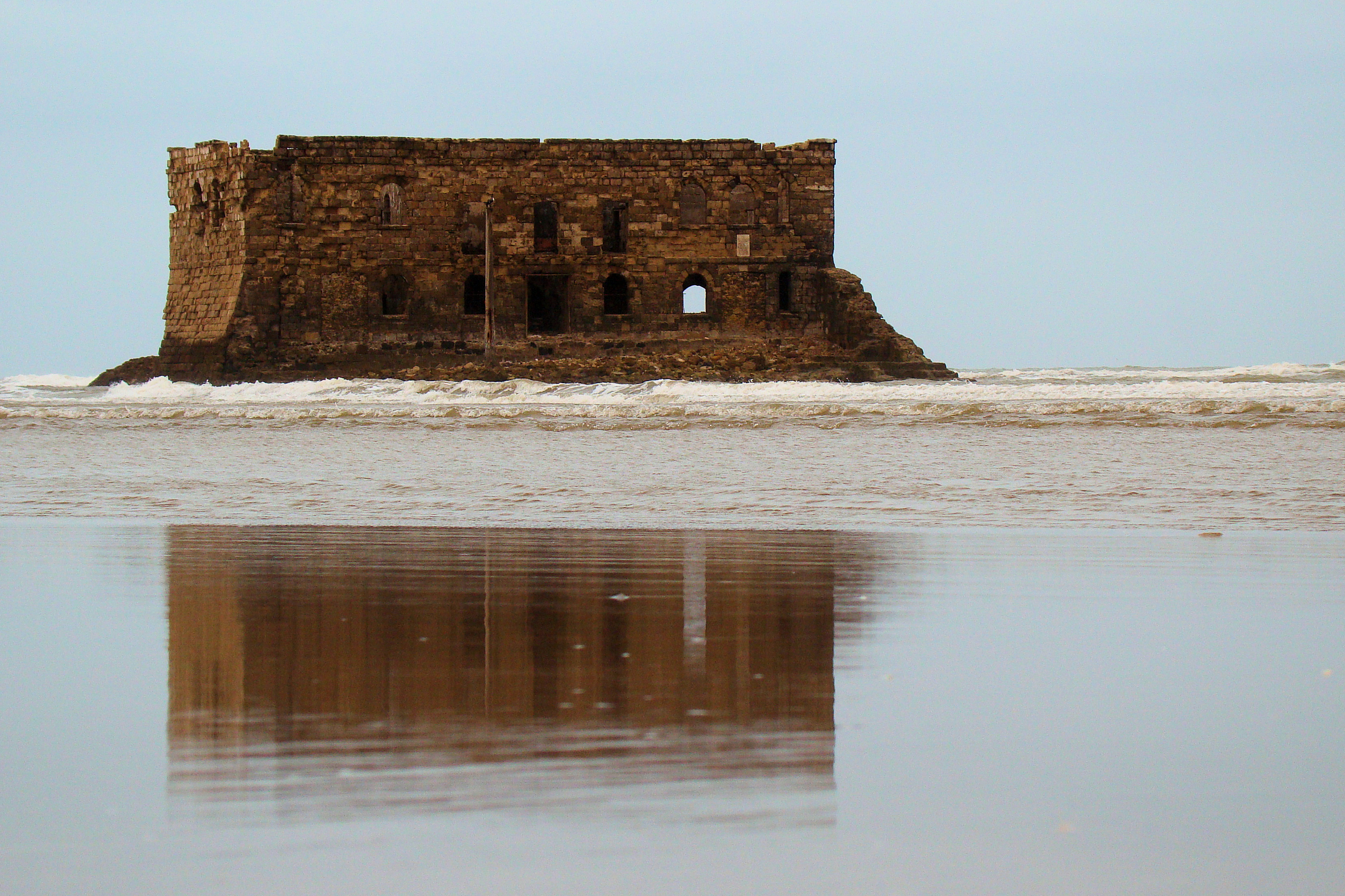
The fortress Casa del Mar, built by the British in the 1880s

Tarfaya (Arabic: طرفاية - Ṭarfāya; Standard Moroccan Tamazight: ⵟⵔⴼⴰⵢⴰ) is a coastal Moroccan town, located at the level of Cape Juby, in western Morocco, on the Atlantic coast. It is located about 890 km southwest of the capital Rabat, and around 100 km from both Laayoune and Lanzarote, in the far east of the Canary Islands. During the colonial era, Tarfaya was a Spanish colony known as Villa Bens. It was unified with Morocco in 1958 after the Ifni War, which started one year after the independence of other regions of Morocco.

Tarfaya is the capital and main town in the Tarfaya Province, and counts a population of 8,027 inhabitants according to the 2014 census. Although founded in the twentieth century, the city has great symbolic significance in Moroccan history, dating back to the era of the Green March in November 1975.

The region of Tarfaya has been linked to relations with foreign powers, following several incursions conducted at its coasts (Spanish, Portuguese, British and French). This blending gave the city a special cultural dimension in its history. The French writer and aviator Antoine de Saint-Exupéry (1900–1944) lived in Tarfaya for two years (1927–1928) before writing his masterpiece The Little Prince that was later translated to more than 300 languages and dialects. He served as station manager here during his career as an airmail pilot. In 2004, the Antoine de Saint-Exupery Museum was opened in Tarfaya.

Tarfaya is home to a number of economic projects, including the largest wind farm in Africa, called Tarfaya Wind Farm, and Casamar, also known as Port Victoria, that was founded by the Scottish trader and traveler Donald McKenzie in 1882. It is the meeting area of Atlantic coast with stretching sand dunes.

Sebkha Tah, the lowest altitude point in Morocco (55 meters below sea level) is located in Tarfaya province. Tarfaya is also the closest city to the Khenifiss National Park, added to the UNESCO World Heritage Tentative list, an ecological site home to hundreds of different kinds of migratory birds each year. It is estimated that more than 20,000 birds from 211 different species breed, nest and feed regularly in the park.

== History ==
Tarfaya was occupied by the British in 1882, when they built a trading post called Casa del Mar. The building is currently in a state of complete disrepair. The Sahrawi tribes then solicited the intervention of Sultan Hassan I who negotiated the withdrawal of the British in 1895 by Treaty of Cape Juby. In 1912 the territory of Tarfaya, then named Cape Juby, was part of the Spanish Sahara. The greater Cape Juby region was unified with Morocco in 1958, at the end of the Ifni War. In December 2014 the Tarfaya Wind Farm, the largest wind farm in Africa, was commissioned.

== Aéropostale ==
Tarfaya's association with Aéropostale began in 1927. The airmail carrier, based in Toulouse, France, was founded by French industrialist Pierre-Georges Latécoère, who envisioned an air route connecting France to its French colonies in Africa. Latécoère firmly believed in the future of aviation as a means of commercial transportation and communication between people.

The nearby Cape Juby airfield was an important refueling and stopover station for Aéropostale. Author-aviator Antoine de Saint-Exupéry was named its station manager in 1927. There he remained for 18 months, on occasion negotiating with the rebellious Moorish tribes to release the imprisoned pilots, as he wrote in his first novel, Southern Mail.

On 28 September 2004 a museum opened in honour of the memory of Aéropostale, Saint-Exupéry and its pilots, as an initiative of the “Friends of Tarfaya Association”supported notably by the city of Toulouse and European aircraft maker Airbus. The museum was inaugurated by renowned aviation journalist Bernard Chabbert, whose father was also part of Aéropostale's history.

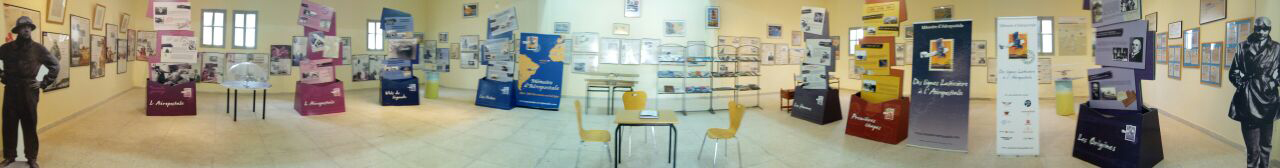
Saint Exupéry Museum in Tarfaya opened in honour of the memory of Aéropostale

The ferry MS MV Assalama, a Naviera Armas commercial vessel, stranded in 2008. Operating a short-lived route between Tarfaya and Fuerteventura in the Canary Islands, it struck the port's breakwater shortly after departure in early 2008 and ran aground. All 113 passengers and crew were safely rescued.

== Air services ==
The town maintains the Tarfaya Airport with the IATA code TFY.

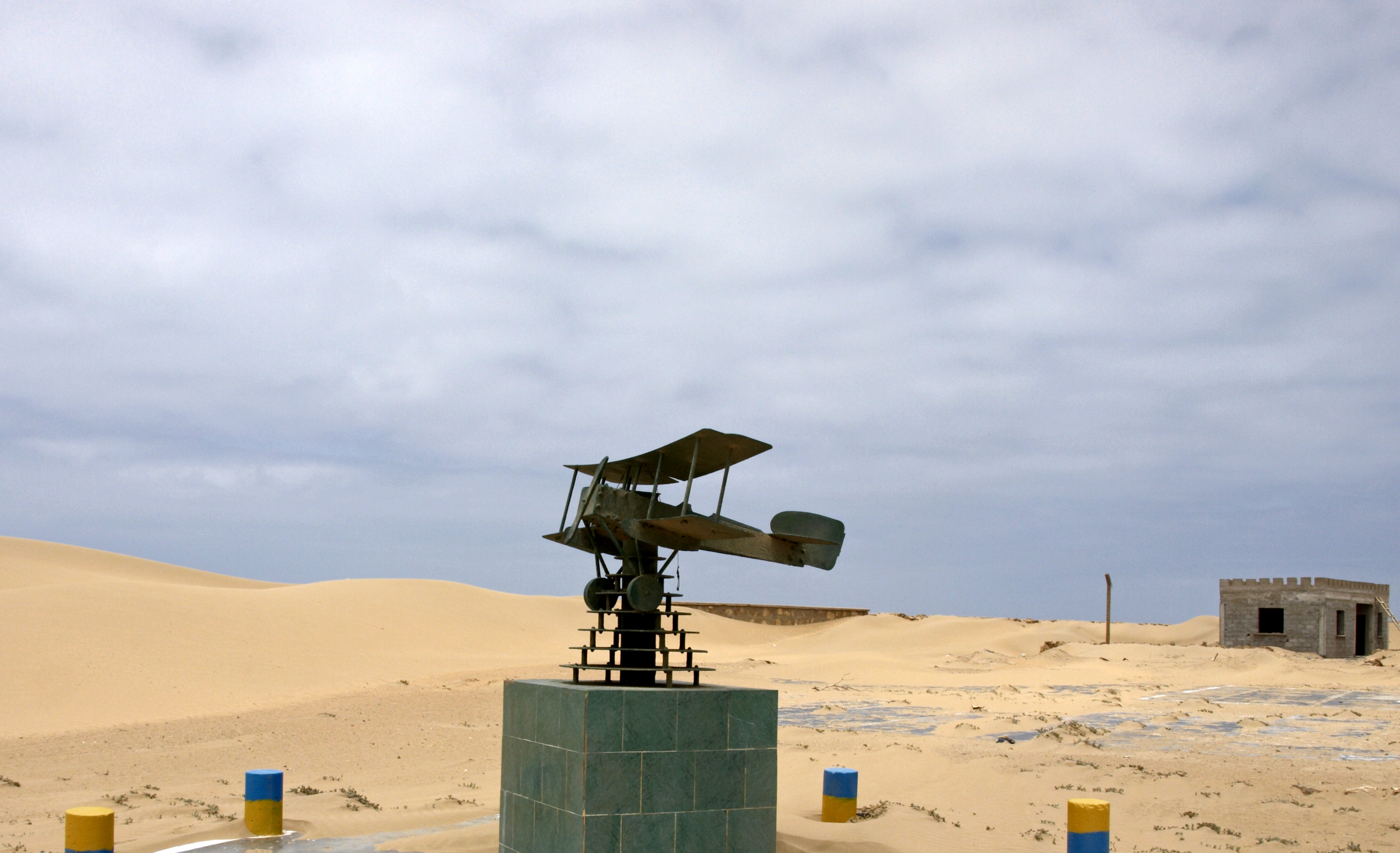
Monument dedicated to Antoine de Saint Exupéry, the author and the airport manager of L'Aéropostale at Cap Juby, just by Tarfaya

== Climate ==
Tarfaya has a desert climate (BWh/BWk).

Climate data for Tarfaya
Month	Jan	Feb	Mar	Apr	May	Jun	Jul	Aug	Sep	Oct	Nov	Dec	Year
Mean daily maximum °C (°F)	19 (66)	19 (66)	20 (68)	21 (70)	21 (70)	22 (72)	22 (72)	23 (73)	23 (73)	23 (73)	22 (72)	20 (68)	21 (70)
Mean daily minimum °C (°F)	13 (55)	13 (55)	14 (57)	15 (59)	16 (61)	17 (63)	18 (64)	18 (64)	18 (64)	17 (63)	16 (61)	13 (55)	16 (60)
Average rainfall mm (inches)	0 (0)	0 (0)	0 (0)	0 (0)	0 (0)	0 (0)	0 (0)	0 (0)	0 (0)	0 (0)	10 (0.4)	0 (0)	10 (0.4)
Source: Weather Atlas
