= High Commission of Spain in Morocco =

Highest administrative body in the Spanish protectorate in Morocco (1913–1956)

- Alta Comisaría de España en Marruecos المفوضية العليا لإسبانيا في المغرب

Agency overview
- Formed: 17 April 1913; 113 years ago
- Dissolved: 6 April 1956; 70 years ago
- Type: Colonial administration
- Jurisdiction: Spanish protectorate in Morocco ^{[1]}
- Headquarters: Royal Palace of Tétouan
- Agency executives: Felipe Alfau Mendoza, first High Commissioner; Rafael García Valiño, last High Commissioner
- Parent agency: Directorate-General for Morocco and the Colonies

Map
- Map of the protectorate's northern zone (Spanish Morocco proper) and southern zone (Cape Juby)

Footnotes
- ^{1} From 1934, its jurisdiction expanded to include Ifni, Spanish Sahara, and Río de Oro. In 1946, these territories were integrated into Spanish West Africa and came under the authority of the Prime Minister's Office.

The High Commission of Spain in Morocco (Spanish: Alta Comisaría de España en Marruecos; Arabic: المفوضية العليا لإسبانيا في المغرب) was the highest administrative body in the Spanish protectorate in Morocco, which existed from 1913 to 1956. The High Commissioner was the head of this body and in turn constituted the highest authority in the protectorate.

== History ==
The position was created in 1913 with the appointment of Major General Felipe Alfau Mendoza as High Commissioner of the Spanish zone of influence in Morocco.

Originally, the position combined both military and civilian functions, so the high commissioner was also the supreme commander of the Army of Africa. The situation changed in 1923 when this dual leadership was abolished and two military groups were created in the western (Ceuta–Tétouan) and eastern (Melilla) zones. Shortly afterwards, the position of military commander of all military forces was reinstated, although it remained separate from the position of High Commissioner. (Note: However, although both positions were separate, the same person was usually appointed to both roles, concentrating the highest military and civil powers of the protectorate in one person.) With the proclamation of the Second Republic, the colonial administration underwent few changes compared to the previous period, although it reinforced the position of civilian-held posts against the traditional presence of military personnel in the colonial administration of the protectorate. In fact, the position of the high commissioner was strengthened in relation to the other lower or subordinate posts, and coordination between the high commissioner and the commander-in-chief of the military forces was reinforced.

In 1934, the High Commission was also granted the authority of governor-general in the territories of Ifni, Spanish Sahara, and Río de Oro. This also led to the subordination of the governors of Sahara and Ifni to the high commissioner, although they did not become part of the protectorate administration. This situation continued until 1946, when Spanish West Africa was created, incorporating the territories of Ifni, Cape Juby, Sahara, and Río de Oro.

There were a total of 24 high commissioners during more than four decades that the protectorate existed, the vast majority of whom were military officers, although some civilians were also appointed to the position: Miguel Villanueva y Gómez and Luis Silvela Casado (1923), Luciano López Ferrer (1931), Juan Moles (1933; 1936), and Manuel Rico Avello (1934). During the Spanish coup of July 1936 that led to the Spanish Civil War, Colonel Eduardo Sáenz de Buruaga briefly held the position until he moved to Córdoba, but this appointment was never made official. The post was not filled until October, when the Nationalist faction officially appointed General Luis Orgaz Yoldi. The last High Commissioner was Lieutenant General Rafael García Valiño, who left office on 8 August 1956, following the independence of Morocco and the dissolution of the Spanish protectorate.

== Functions ==
The administration in the Spanish protectorate in Morocco was headed by a high commissioner, a figure modeled on the British high commissioners and formally accredited to the Jalifa (as the sultan's representative), but in practice the highest authority in the Protectorate. The High Commission directed Spain's political action in the protectorate, and orders and instructions emanated from it. The High Commissioner was assisted by various departments (Indigenous Affairs, Development, and Finance). There was a territorial auditor in each region, reporting directly to the Delegation of Indigenous Affairs. Subordinate to him was a next level, with district auditors and, finally, local auditors. Maintaining order was the responsibility of the Regulares (Spanish Army forces with Riffian "indigenous" troops) and the Indigenous Police. In military matters, the high commissioner was assisted by three commanders based in Ceuta, Melilla, and Larache.

There was a territorial administrator in each region, directly representing the Delegation of Indigenous Affairs. Subordinate to him was a next level, with district administrators and, finally, local administrators.
