= List of Spanish high commissioners in Morocco =

High Commissioner of Spain in Morocco
- Alto Comisario de España en Marruecos
- Merchant flag of Spanish Morocco

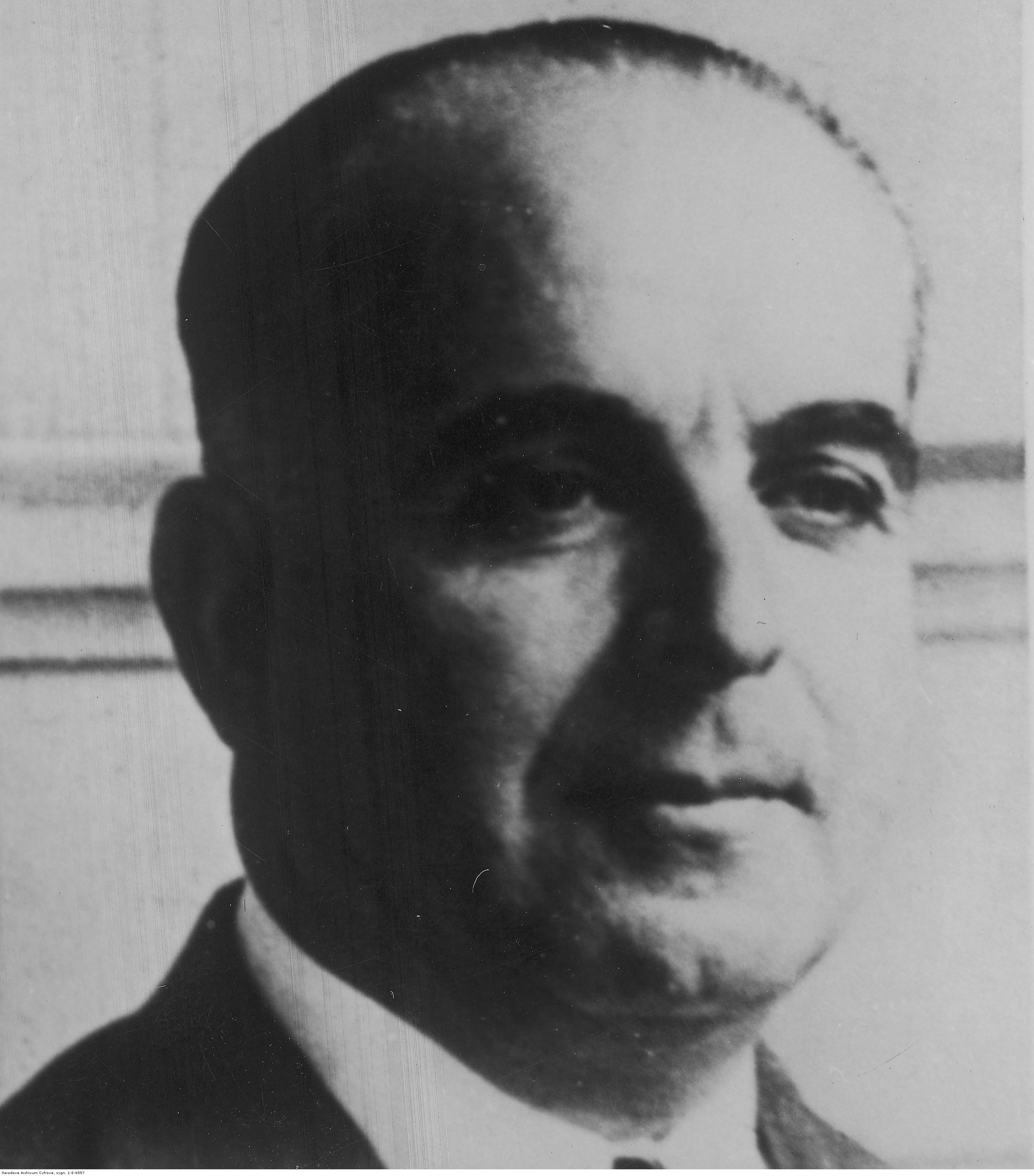
- Longest serving José Enrique Varela; 4 March 1945 – 24 March 1951
- High Commission of Spain in Morocco
- Reports to: Head of State of Spain
- Residence: Royal Palace of Tétouan
- Seat: Tetuán
- Formation: 3 April 1913
- First holder: Felipe Alfau Mendoza
- Final holder: Rafael García Valiño
- Abolished: 7 April 1956

Spanish Morocco (yellow), 1956.

On 27 November 1912, amidst the French conquest of Morocco and in the aftermath of the Agadir Crisis, the Treaty Between France and Spain Regarding Morocco was signed by the French Third Republic and the Kingdom of Spain. According to the treaty, parts of Morocco would become a Spanish protectorate from 1912 to 1956, when the country regained its independence.

== List ==
(Dates in italics indicate de facto continuation of office)

Tenure	Incumbent	Notes	Portrait
3 April 1913 to 15 August 1913	Felipe Alfau Mendoza, High Commissioner		
17 August 1913 to 9 July 1915	José Marina Vega, High Commissioner		
9 July 1915 to 18 November 1918	Francisco Gómez Jordana, High Commissioner	Died in office	
27 January 1919 to 13 July 1922	Dámaso Berenguer, High Commissioner		
15 July 1922 to 22 January 1923	Ricardo Burguete, High Commissioner		
16 February 1923 to 14 September 1923	Luis Silvela Casado, High Commissioner	1st civil administrator	
25 September 1923 to 16 October 1924	Luis Aizpuru y Mondéjar, High Commissioner		
16 October 1924 to 2 November 1925	Miguel Primo de Rivera, High Commissioner		
2 November 1925 to November 1928	José Sanjurjo, High Commissioner	1st term	
November 1928 to 19 April 1931	Francisco Gómez-Jordana Sousa, High Commissioner	Son of Francisco Gómez Jordana	
19 April 1931 to 20 June 1931	José Sanjurjo, High Commissioner	2nd term	
20 June 1931 to May 1933	Luciano López Ferrer, High Commissioner		
May 1933 to 23 January 1934	Juan Moles, High Commissioner	1st term	
23 January 1934 to March 1936	Manuel Rico Avello, High Commissioner		
March 1936 to May 1936	Juan Moles, High Commissioner	2nd term	
May 1936 to 18 July 1936	Arturo Álvarez-Buylla Godino, Acting High Commissioner		
18 July 1936 to July 1936	Eduardo Sáenz de Buruaga, High Commissioner		
July 1936 to 2 October 1936	Francisco Franco, High Commissioner		
2 October 1936 to March 1937	Luis Orgaz Yoldi, High Commissioner	1st term	
August 1937 to 12 August 1939	Juan Luis Beigbeder, High Commissioner		
16 August 1939 to 12 May 1941	Carlos Asensio Cabanillas, High Commissioner		
12 May 1941 to 4 March 1945	Luis Orgaz Yoldi, High Commissioner	2nd term	
4 March 1945 to 24 March 1951	José Enrique Varela, High Commissioner	Died in office	
24 March 1951 to 7 April 1956	Rafael García Valiño, High Commissioner		

== See also ==
- French protectorate in Morocco
  - List of French residents-general in Morocco
- Spanish Sahara
  - List of colonial governors of Spanish Sahara
- Spanish West Africa

== Sources ==
- https://www.rulers.org/rulm2.html#morocco
- African States and Rulers, John Stewart, McFarland
- Heads of State and Government, 2nd Edition, John V da Graca, MacMillan Press (2000)
