= Directorate-General for Morocco and the Colonies =

Former Spanish government agency (1925–1956)

- Dirección General de Marruecos y Colonias

Agency overview
- Formed: 15 December 1925; 100 years ago
- Dissolved: 1956; 70 years ago
- Superseding agency: Directorate-General of African Places and Provinces
- Type: Colonial administration
- Jurisdiction: Spanish protectorate of Morocco; Spanish Guinea; Saguia el-Hamra; Río de Oro; Ifni
- Headquarters: Madrid

Map
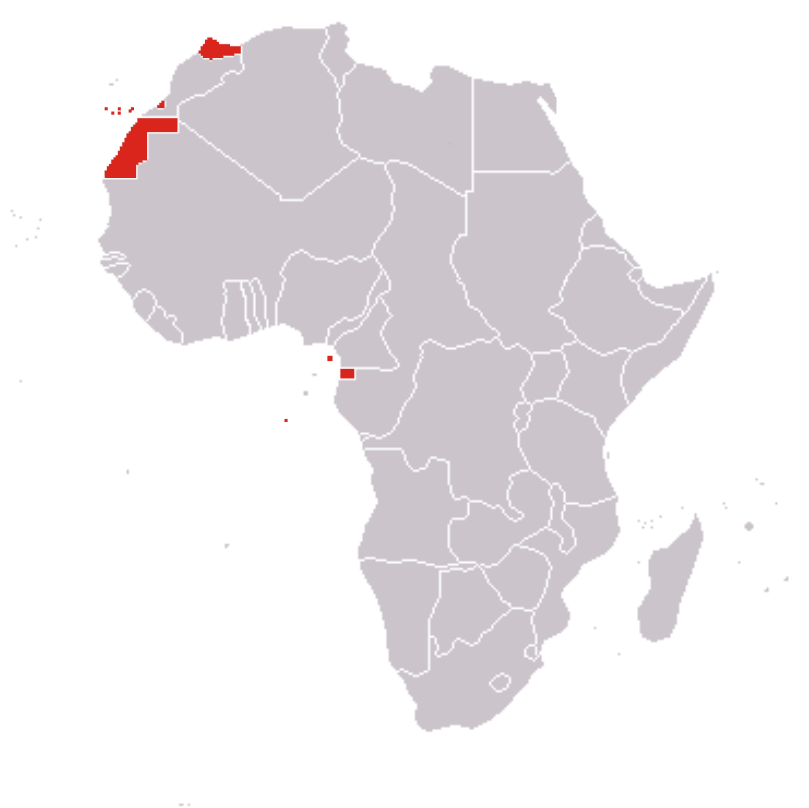
- Spanish colonies in Africa in 1950

The Directorate-General for Morocco and the Colonies (Spanish: Dirección General de Marruecos y Colonias) was a Spanish government agency in charge of the administration of the territories that the Spanish Empire possessed in Africa.

== History ==
The organization was created on 15 December 1925, during the dictatorship of General Miguel Primo de Rivera. It assumed all administrative management of the Spanish protectorate in Morocco, the Spanish colonies in West Africa (Sahara and Ifni) and the territories of Spanish Guinea. The High Commission of Spain in Morocco and the governors of the Spanish Sahara also depended on this organization. The directorate-general reported directly to the Presidency of the Government. In 1934, during the period of the Second Republic, the directorate-general was abolished by the government and its functions reorganized. However, in July 1936 the Republican government recreated this organization.

During the Spanish Civil War, the African territories fell under the control of the Nationalist faction, which in 1938 created the so-called National Service of Morocco and Colonies—dependent on the Vice Presidency of the Government—to exercise administrative functions over Morocco and the African colonies, recovering the functions of the former directorate-general; in fact, after the end of the conflict, this body would regain its former administrative rank. In August 1939, the recovered Directorate-General for Morocco and the Colonies became dependent on the Ministry of Foreign Affairs, but by decree of 15 January 1942, it returned to the presidency of the government.

In 1956, following the independence of Morocco and the dissolution of the protectorate, the organization was renamed the Directorate-General of African Places and Provinces. In 1969, with the dissolution of Spanish Guinea and the transfer of the province of Ifni to Morocco, the organization was renamed the Directorate-General for the Promotion of the Sahara, a name it retained until the loss of Spanish Sahara in 1976 and its dissolution.

== See also ==
- Spanish Africa
- Spanish West Africa
- Ministry of Overseas (Spain)
