= Carlos Asensio Cabanillas =

Spanish military officer (1896–1969)

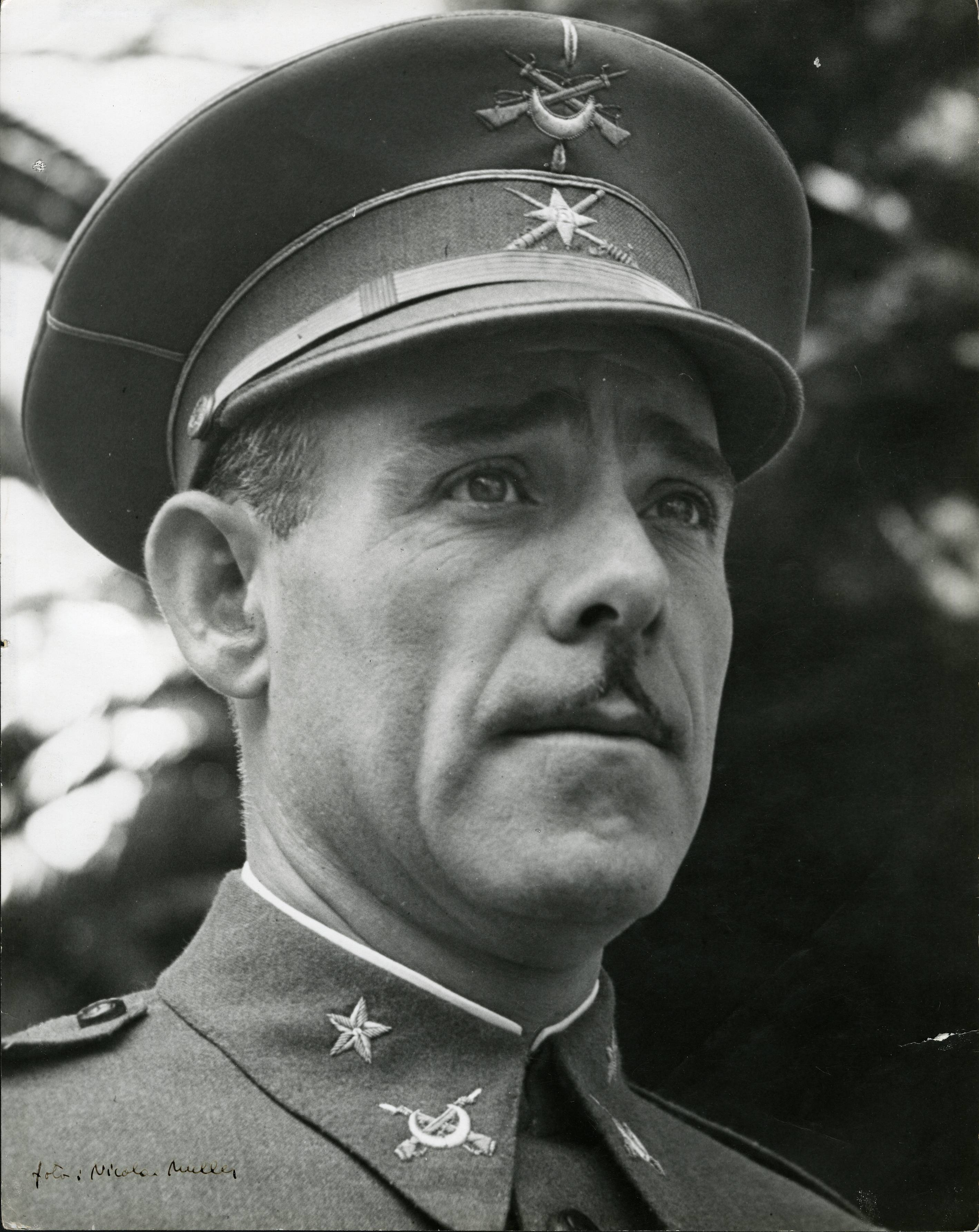
- Born: Carlos Asensio Cabanillas; 14 November 1896; Madrid, Kingdom of Spain
- Died: 28 April 1969 (aged 72); Madrid, Francoist Spain
- Military career
- Allegiance: Kingdom of Spain; Spanish Republic; Nationalist Spain
- Branch: Spanish Army
- Rank: General
- Conflicts: Rif War; Spanish Civil War

Carlos Asensio Cabanillas (14 November 1896 – 28 April 1969) was a Spanish soldier and statesman who fought for the Nationalist faction during the Spanish Civil War, rising in command from Colonel to General in Franco's Army of Africa.

When Franco's military conspiracy flared into revolt in July 1936, Asensio Cabanillas and Colonel Sáenz de Buruaga easily secured Tétouan for the rebels. In the first month of the war his column, fighting alongside Juan Yagüe's troops, made an impressive forced march from Seville to Mérida and then towards Madrid, storming and taking the cities of Badajoz, Toledo, and Talavera. His bloody advance into the University City during the Siege of Madrid would mark the farthest Nationalist advance against the city until the end of the war. At the Jarama his column spearheaded the attack across the river but was stalled thereafter by the International Brigades.

After the war Franco promoted Asensio Cabanillas to Lieutenant General. He served as the High Commissioner of the Spanish protectorate in Morocco from 1939 to 1941, and later as the Chief of Staff of the Army from 1941 to 1942, Minister of the Army from 1942 to 1945 and Captain General of the Balearic Islands from 1945 to 1948. Finally, he served as the Chief of the Defence High Command (chief of staff of the Spanish Armed Forces), from 1955 to 1958.

Asensio Cabanillas died in 1969.

Government offices
Preceded by Juan Luis Beigbeder y Atienza	High Commissioner of the Spanish protectorate in Morocco; 16 August 1939 – 12 May 1941	Succeeded by Luis Orgaz Yoldi
Preceded by José Enrique Varela	Minister of the Army; 3 September 1942 – 20 July 1945	Succeeded by Fidel Dávila Arrondo
Military offices
Preceded by Carlos Martínez de Campos y Serrano	Chief of Staff of the Army; 12 May 1941 – 4 September 1942	Succeeded by Rafael García Valiño
Preceded by Juan Vigón	Chief of the Defence High Command; 3 June 1955 – 6 June 1958	Succeeded by Agustín Muñoz Grandes
