= Arturo Álvarez-Buylla Godino =

Spanish General

- Born: August 24, 1895; Oviedo
- Died: March 16, 1937 (aged 41); Ceuta
- Cause of death: Execution by firing squad
- Military career
- Conflicts: Rif War; Spanish Civil War

Arturo Álvarez-Buylla Godino (Oviedo, August 24, 1895 – Ceuta, March 16, 1937) was a Spanish military officer, a pioneer of aviation, who rose to the position of High Commissioner in the Protectorate of Morocco shortly before the coup d'état that led to the Spanish Civil War. His loyalty to the Republic led to his execution by the rebels.

== Biography ==
Born in 1895 in the city of Oviedo. An artillery lieutenant in 1919, he participated as an aviator in the Rif War with dozens of combat flights. He was awarded the Military Merit Cross, First Class, the Military Medal of Morocco, and the Red Cross. During the Primo de Rivera dictatorship, the artillery corps was dissolved, only to be reestablished months later provided the officers signed a declaration of support for the dictator. Álvarez-Buylla was the only officer who refused to sign, and he was forced to leave the army.

During this time, he worked as an inspector at the Loring Aircraft Factory in Carabanchel and was one of the first Spaniards to parachute. He participated in the failed Jaca Uprising against the soft dictatorship of Damaso Berenguer, joining the rebel officers at Cuatro Vientos Aerodrome on December 15, 1930. He was the only officer who did not flee the aerodrome after the failed attempt, and was subsequently arrested.

However, the proclamation of the Second Spanish Republic months later allowed him to rejoin the army, where he was appointed technical director general of civil aviation. In 1934, he returned to the nascent Spanish military aviation as head of the fighter group based at Getafe Air Base. With the triumph of the Popular Front (Spain) in the 1936 Spanish general elections, he was appointed Secretary General of the Spanish High Commissariat in Morocco in the Spanish Protectorate of Morocco, temporarily replacing Commissioner Juan Moles Ormella when the latter was appointed minister.

When the July 1936 coup d'état that sparked the Civil War took place a few weeks later, Álvarez-Buylla found himself virtually isolated within the Protectorate, amid the almost complete adherence of the military units in the area. He tried to organize resistance with Commander De la Puente Bahamonde at the Sania Ramel airfield, but he realized that it was impossible to oppose the rebellion with the limited resources at his disposal. In the end, isolated and surrounded in his home with a few loyal officers, he was arrested on the morning of July 18 in his office by several rebels under the orders of Colonel Buruaga and transferred the next day to Tetouan, where he was imprisoned. He was tried in March 1937 before a court martial where he refused to testify or attend the sessions for not recognizing the authority of the court, being sentenced to death penalty for sedition and shot in Ceuta on March 16.

== Family ==
His son, Ramón Álvarez-Buylla, went into exile in Mexico, being a notable surgeon and neurophysiologist; His grandson, Arturo Álvarez-Buylla Roces, is a renowned neurobiologist and winner of the Prince of Asturias Award for Technical and Scientific Research in 2011, While his granddaughter Elena Álvarez-Buylla is a renowned doctor in molecular genetics.
