= Luis Javier Benavides Orgaz =

Assassinated Spanish labor lawyer

Luis Javier Benavides Orgaz (Villacarrillo, Jaén, 9 January 1951– Madrid, 24 January 1977) was a Spanish labour lawyer murdered in his office in Calle Atocha 55, one of the victims of the Atocha massacre committed by far-right gunmen during the post-Franco transition period.

== Biography ==
Benavides was the son of Pablo Benavides Gómez-Arenzana and María Mercedes Orgaz Lafuente, the daughter of Francoist general Luis Orgaz Yoldi. One of his elder brothers was the politician and diplomat Pablo Benavides, who occupied posts in various embassies. Nicknamed Luisja, he studied at Colegio Nuestra Señora del Recuerdo where he received a Jesuit education. That education, and his close relation with two teachers Ramón Arrizabalaga and Ángel Sánchez del Nozal, was key in his developing a religious conscience that drew him to some of the neediest neighbourhoods of Madrid, such as La Celsa, El Pozo del Tío Raimundo and El Pozo del Huevo, while he was still at school.

He studied "Derecho y Empresariales" (Law and Business Studies) at ICADE, and in December 1976, joined the Communist Party (PCE). On finishing his course he started work in the Labour Law Office that Manuela Carmena had at calle Atocha 55. He was in a relationship with another Madrid labour lawyer, Elisa Maravall, who worked for Cristina Almeida in calle Españoleto.

On 24 January 1977, at a time of heightened tension after a series of politically-motivated killings Benavides was murdered in his office. The group of lawyers in Atocha 55 were waiting to begin a meeting when the doorbell rang. Luis Javier Benavides opened the door to the gunmen. He died at the scene of the shootings and his body was taken to a Madrid hospital. After a private funeral he was buried in the San Isidro Cemetery.

Years after the attack, a plaque was dedicated to him in a park in his birthplace. The lawyer and politician José Bono, a friend of his brother Pablo Benavides and member of the Socialist Party, represented the Benavides family during the trial in 1980.

== Tributes ==
On 11 January 2002, the Council of Ministers posthumously awarded him the Grand Cross of the Order of Saint Raymond of Peñafort.

In March 2018, Madrid City Council changed the name of the Pinos Alta Gardens to Luis Javier Benavides Gardens. The gardens were the former location of the Valdeacederas Residents' Association, of which Benavides was an advisor.
