= Manuel Rico Avello =

Spanish politician (1886–1936)

The Most Excellent Manuel Rico Avello y García de Lañón
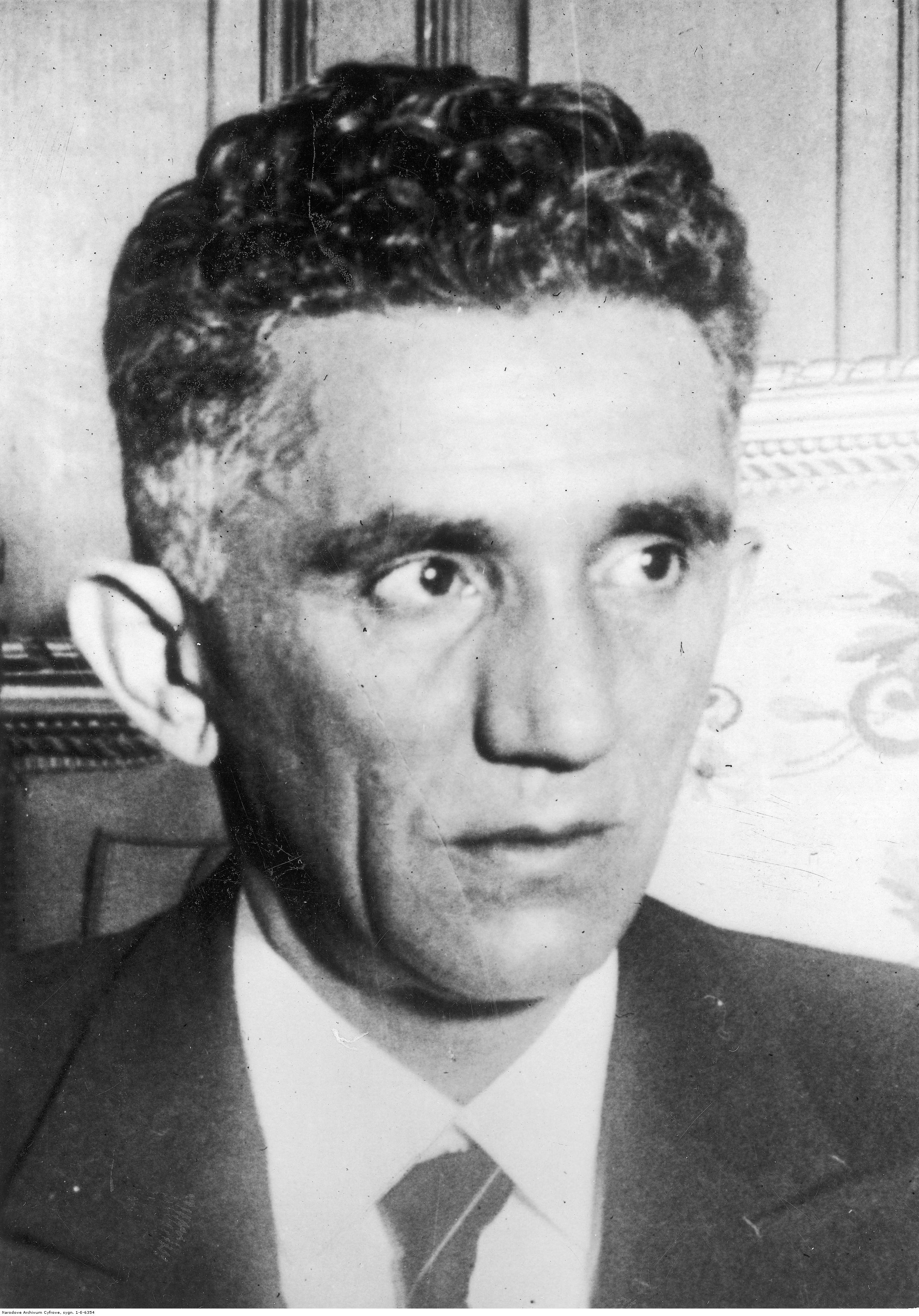
- Rico Avello in 1936

Minister of Finance
- In office 30 December 1935 – 19 February 1936
- President: Niceto Alcalá-Zamora
- Prime Minister: Manuel Portela Valladares
- Preceded by: Joaquín Chapaprieta
- Succeeded by: Gabriel Franco López

Spanish High Commissioner in Morocco
- In office 23 January 1934 – 11 January 1936
- Monarch: Mohammed V (Note: The Sultan of Morocco remained the de jure sovereign of the Spanish protectorate in Morocco and was represented by a Jalifa based in Tétouan.)
- President: Niceto Alcalá-Zamora
- Prime Minister: Alejandro Lerroux; Ricardo Samper; Joaquín Chapaprieta; Manuel Portela Valladares
- Preceded by: Juan Moles
- Succeeded by: Manuel de la Plaza Navarro (Acting)

Minister of the Interior
- In office 8 October 1933 – 23 January 1934
- President: Niceto Alcalá-Zamora
- Prime Minister: Diego Martínez Barrio; Alejandro Lerroux
- Preceded by: Diego Martínez Barrio
- Succeeded by: Diego Martínez Barrio

Subsecretary for the Merchant Navy
- In office 21 September 1933 – 14 October 1933
- President: Niceto Alcalá-Zamora
- Prime Minister: Alejandro Lerroux; Diego Martínez Barrio
- Minister: Vicente Iranzo Enguita; Leandro Pita Romero
- Preceded by: Leonardo Martín Echeverría
- Succeeded by: Sergio Andión Pérez

Member of the Congress of Deputies
- In office 27 February 1936 – 23 August 1936
- Constituency: Murcia
- In office 7 July 1931 – 2 October 1933
- Constituency: Oviedo

Personal details
- Born: Manuel Rico Avello y García de Lañón; December 20, 1886 Valdés, Asturias, Kingdom of Spain
- Died: August 23, 1936 (aged 49) Cárcel Modelo, Madrid, Second Spanish Republic
- Cause of death: Execution by shooting
- Party: Party of the Democratic Centre (1936)
- Other political affiliations: Independent (1932–1936); Grouping at the Service of the Republic (1931–1932); Reformist Party (1913–1924) (Note: All political parties were forcibly disbanded in 1924; however, Rico Avello remained affiliated with Melquíades Álvarez—leader of the Reformist Party—until April 1930.)
- Spouse: Castora Rico Rivas (m. 1914–1936)
- Children: 3
- Education: University of Oviedo
- Occupation: Politician, lawyer, and journalist
- Awards: Grand Cross of Naval Merit

Manuel Rico Avello y García de Lañón (20 December 1886 - 23 August 1936) was a Spanish politician, lawyer, and journalist who served as Minister of the Interior, Spanish High Commissioner in Morocco, and Minister of Finance during the Second Spanish Republic. Imprisoned by the Republican authorities at the start of the Spanish Civil War, he was later killed—along with a number of other political prisoners—by anarchist militiamen in the Cárcel Modelo massacre.

== Biography ==
=== Early life ===
Rico Avello was born on 20 December 1886 in Valdés, Asturias, the first of eleven siblings. His parents were José Rico García-Lañón—a well-to-do member of the Asturian bourgeoisie and later a republican mayor of Valdés—and Dolores Avello Suárez. In 1914, shortly after opening a law firm in Oviedo, Rico Avello married a second cousin—Castora Rico Rivas.

=== Political career ===
Rico Avello was elected to the Congress of Deputies for Oviedo in the 1931 Spanish general election as an 'independent federalist' (Note: Also referred to as a 'federal republican') on the electoral list of the Republican–Socialist Conjunction.

On 21 September 1933, Rico Avello was appointed Subsecretary for the Merchant Navy by Vicente Iranzo Enguita, Minister of the Navy. Shortly after his appointment as Subsecretary, Rico Avello vacated his seat in the Congress of Deputies—as mandated by the 'Law of Incompatibilities'. He continued to serve as Subsecretary until shortly after his appointment as Minister of the Interior the next month.

On 8 October 1933, Rico Avello succeeded incoming Prime Minister Diego Martínez Barrio as Minister of the Interior. He continued to hold the position under Martínez' successor as Prime Minister—Alejandro Lerroux. As Minister of the Interior, Rico Avello was criticised by members of the Civil Guard for a 'lack of consultation' in his attempts to reform the corps.

Lerroux described Rico Avello as "a man of 'good will', 'noble character' and 'good intentions'", but also as "'until yesterday a traditional cacique and now the guardian of electoral virtue'", and noted that his appointment was made as a result of President Acala Zamora's influence.

Rico Avello was appointed Spanish High Commissioner in Morocco on 23 January 1934. It has been suggested that Rico Avello was appointed High Commissioner 'as a means of removing him from a post [Minister of the Interior] in which his performance had been judged less than satisfactory', with Lerroux blaming both Martínez Barrio and Rico Avello for failing to provide the Radicals with a majority in the 1933 elections.

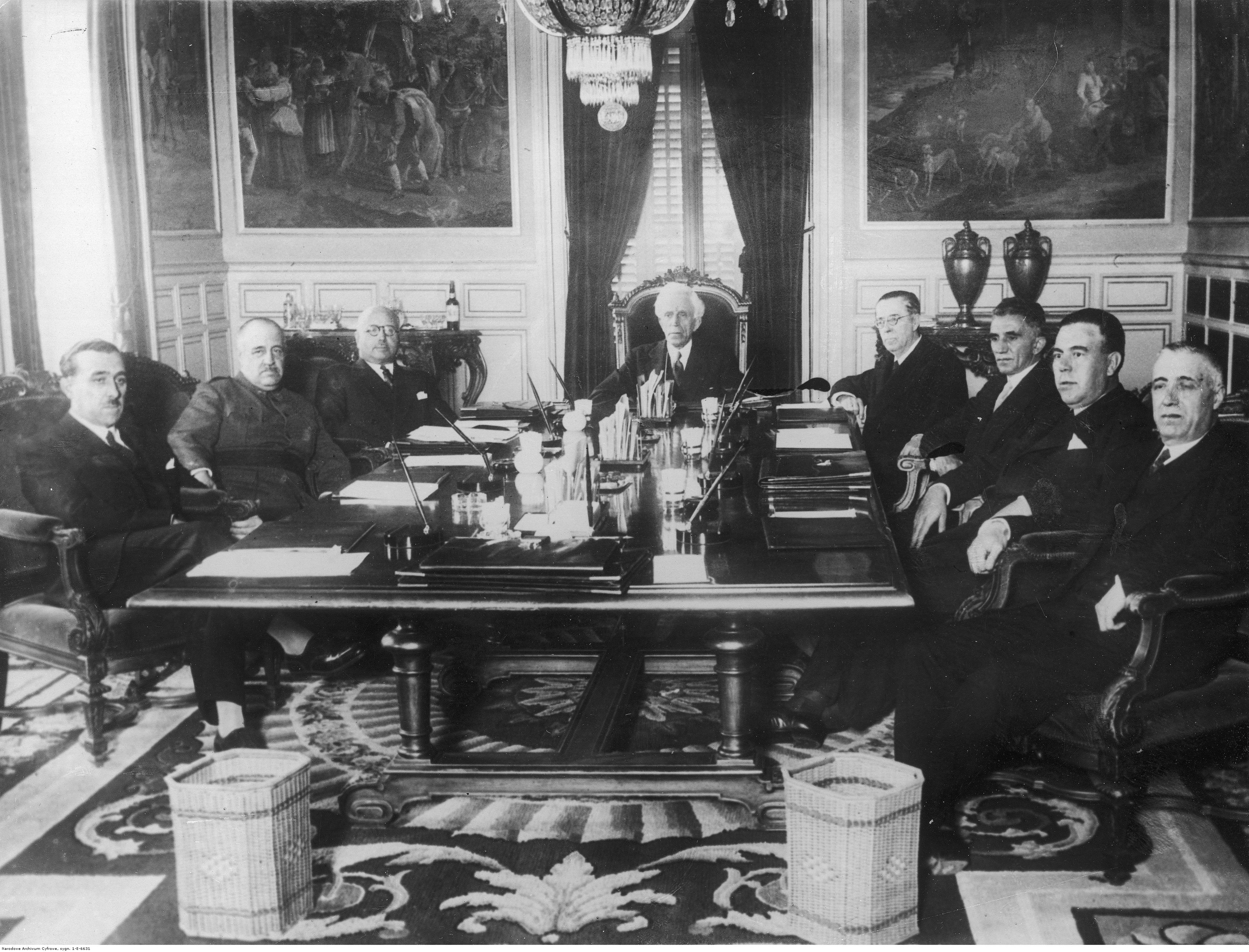
Manuel Portela Valladares' cabinet on 30 December 1935. Rico Avello is seated third from the right.

In early 1936, there existed speculation that President Niceto Alcalá-Zamora was on the verge of dismissing Prime Minister Manuel Azaña and appointing Rico Avello in his place—at the head of a 'more responsible left Republican government'.

=== Spanish Civil War ===
On 14 August 1936, Rico Avello and his son Carlos were arrested by agents of the Milicia Populare de Investigación—a highly politicised and socialist controlled Civil War police brigade —and imprisoned in the Cárcel Modelo. On 22 August, a fire broke out in the Cárcel Modelo under uncertain circumstances and a 'mixed committee of leftist prison warders and militiamen' took control of the prison in the ensuring chaos. That same night Rico Avello and at least 23 other political prisoners were 'tried' and then shot in the basement of the Cárcel Modelo.
