= Royal Palace of Tétouan =

Moroccan palace

Coordinates: 35°34′15″N 5°22′05″W

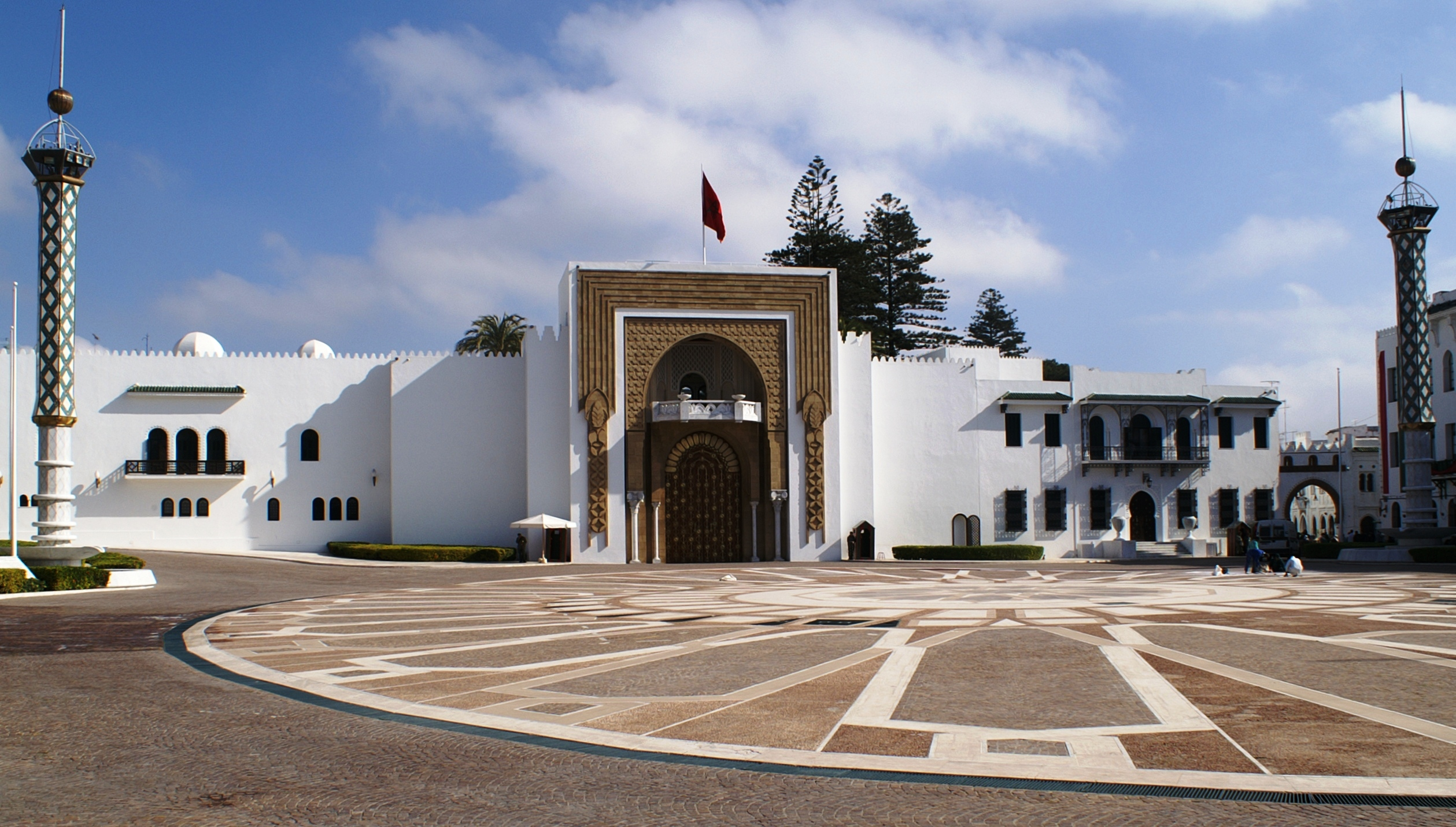
Front entrance of the Royal Palace on Hassan II Square, with the former Palace of the Khalifa on the left

The Royal Palace of Tétouan is a palace of the Moroccan Monarchy in Tétouan, Morocco, and the former main seat of political authority of the Spanish protectorate in Morocco from 1913 to 1956. It encloses both the former governor's palace and the former Spanish consulate, which in the protectorate era respectively housed the Khalifa or personal representative of the Sultan of Morocco on the compound's northwestern side, and the Spanish High Commissioner on its southeastern side. The palace is located on Hassan II Square, a historic urban space also traditionally known as the Feddan, in the Medina of Tétouan.

== History ==
=== Palace of the Governor, then of the Khalifa ===
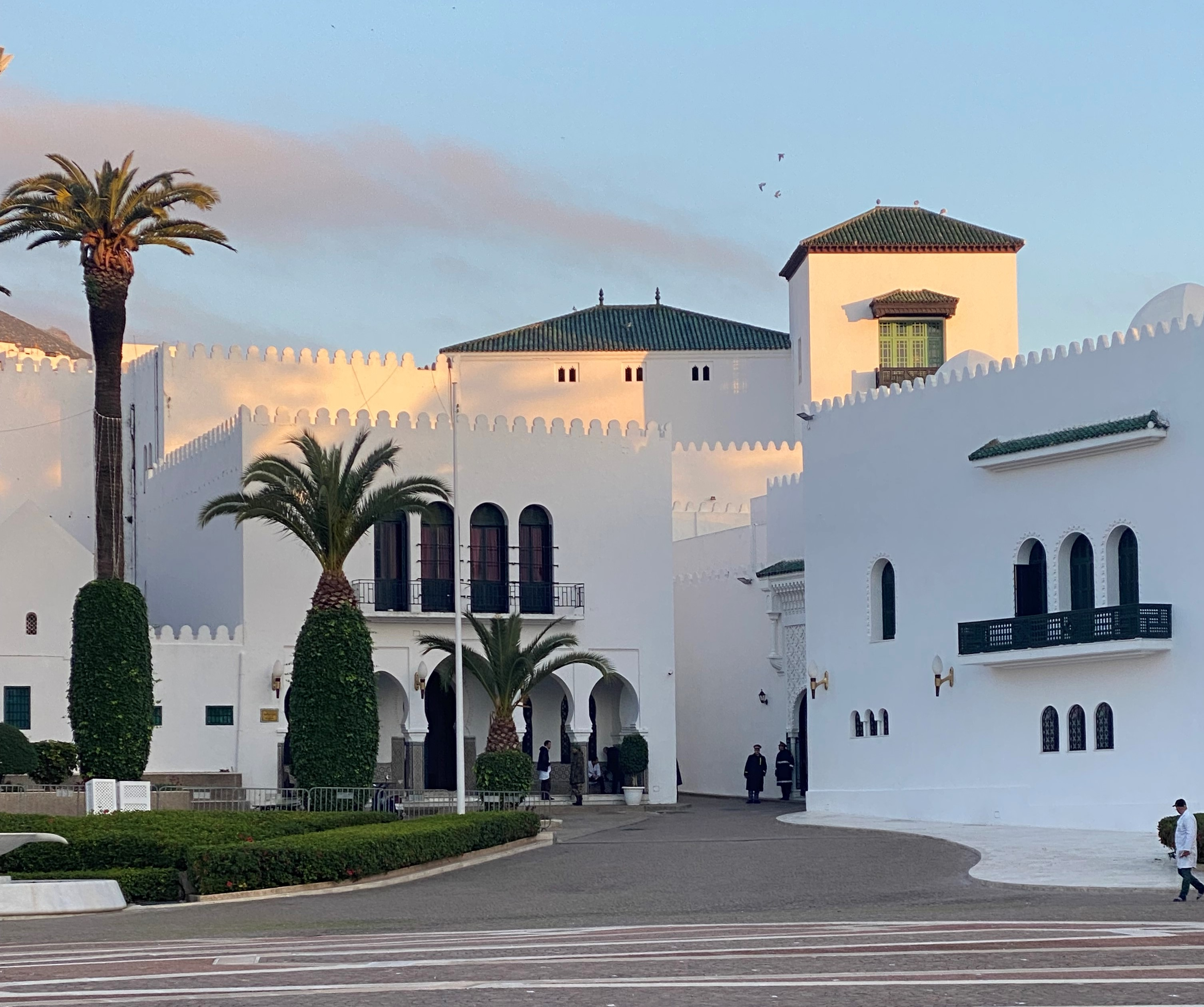
Former palace of the Governor then of the Khalifa, now part of the Royal Palace

The compound's oldest building was constructed around 1740 as the local Government Palace (Dar al-Emrat). In 1913 it became the seat of the Khalifa, namely Mohammed Mehedi Uld Ben Ismael until his death in 1923, then his son Hassan Ben el Mehedi Ben Ismael until the protectorate's end in 1956. It was remodeled several times, including in 1947 on a design by painter Mariano Bertuchi.

=== Spanish Consulate, then High Commissariate ===
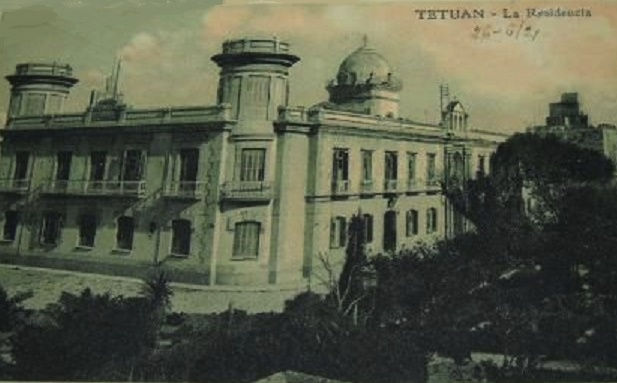
Residence of the Spanish High Commissioner, ca. 1920

The Spanish Consulate in Tétouan was established following the Treaty of Wad Ras that concluded the Hispano-Moroccan War (1859–1860), which also stipulated that a Franciscan mission be created in the town. The consulate's main building was designed by Coronel Gelis of the Spanish Corps of Engineers and built between 1861 and 1864. The adjacent Franciscan church was completed in 1866. In 1913, the consulate building became the residence of the High Commissioner of the newly created Spanish protectorate in Morocco, also known as the High Commissariate (Spanish: Alta Comisaría). It was subsequently remodeled in the mid-1910s by Tétouan municipal architect Carlos Ovilo Castelo, who added the two circular towers that frame the building's western façade. In 1926, the Franciscan mission moved away from the compound and relocated to the newly built church of Nuestra Señora de la Victoria in the Spanish colonial expansion of the city (Spanish: Ensanche de Tetuán). The interiors of the High Commissioner's residence were again remodeled in the late 1940s by High Commissioner José Enrique Varela.

=== Royal Palace ===
The complex was repurposed as a Royal palace following Morocco's independence in 1956 and its proclamation as a kingdom on 14 August 1957. It was refurbished under King Hassan II by designer André Paccard. In 1988, the Feddan was remodeled and a wall and monumental gate were erected, thus isolating the former High Commissioner's residence from public view. The palace is not open to the public.

== See also ==
- Mendoubia, the former seat of the Mendoub, Tangier's counterpart to Tétouan's Khalifa
- French Protectorate Residence, Rabat
- List of Moroccan royal residences
