= José Enrique Varela =

Spanish military officer (1891–1951)

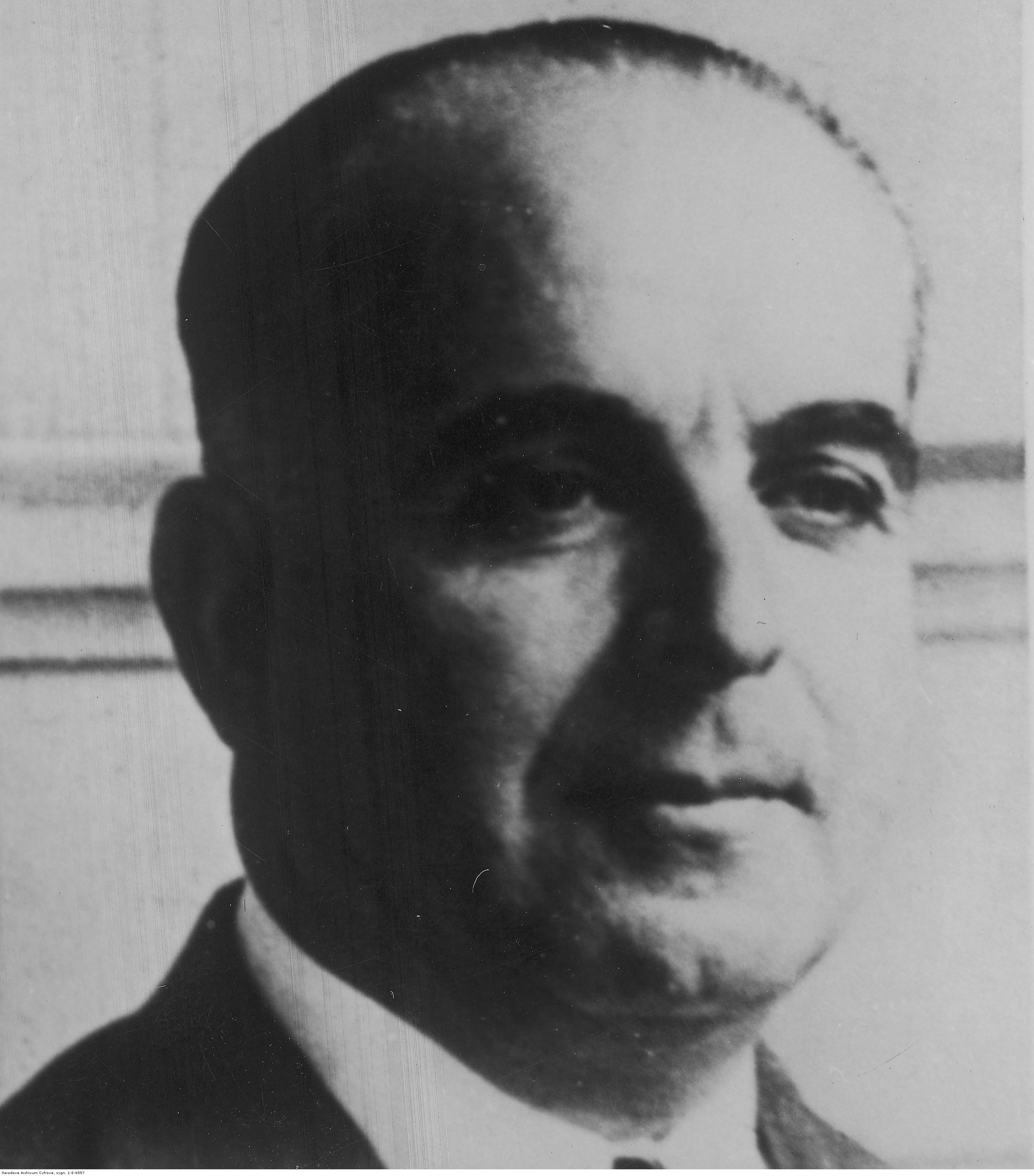
- Born: José Enrique Varela; 17 April 1891; San Fernando, Cádiz, Kingdom of Spain
- Died: 24 March 1951 (aged 59); Tangier, International Zone
- Military career
- Allegiance: Kingdom of Spain (1904–1931); Spanish Republic (1931–1936); Nationalist Spain (1936–1951)
- Branch: Spanish Army
- Service years: 1904–1951
- Rank: General
- Conflicts: Rif War; Spanish Civil War
- Awards: Laureate Cross of Saint Ferdinand

Minister of the Army of Spain
- In office 9 August 1939 – 3 September 1942
- Caudillo: Francisco Franco
- Prime Minister: Francisco Franco
- Preceded by: Position created
- Succeeded by: Carlos Asensio Cabanillas

High Commissioner of Spain in Morocco
- In office 4 March 1945 – 24 March 1951
- Caudillo: Francisco Franco
- Prime Minister: Francisco Franco
- Minister of State: José Félix de Lequerica y Erquiza; Alberto Martín-Artajo Álvarez
- Preceded by: Luis Orgaz Yoldi
- Succeeded by: Rafael García Valiño

José Enrique Varela Iglesias, 1st Marquis of San Fernando de Varela (17 April 1891 – 24 March 1951) was a Spanish military officer noted for his role as a Nationalist commander in the Spanish Civil War.

== Early career ==
Varela started his military career as an enlisted man in the Spanish Marines for three years starting in 1909. Varela initially enlisted as a recruit in the same regiment his father served as sergeant. He rose from private to the rank of sergeant and then enrolled at infantry school in Spain and graduated as a lieutenant.

Returning to Morocco, he distinguished himself in action and King Alfonso XIII awarded him the Laureate Cross of Saint Ferdinand, Spain's highest military award, on two separate occasions, an unmatched honor for bravery in battle. He commanded native Moroccan troops of Regulares and rose to the rank of captain by merit and participated in several campaigns in the Morocco war, the principal one being the joint Franco-Spanish amphibious landing at Alhucemas in 1925. This landing altered the course of the Morocco War and hastened its end. Shortly thereafter he was promoted to lieutenant colonel and to colonel at the end of the war.

During the early 1930s, he was assigned as a member of a military mission that spent time in Germany, Switzerland, Belgium and France to broaden their military knowledge. With the coming of the Republic, he participated in the abortive José Sanjurjo uprising in 1932 for which he was imprisoned. He was released and joined the Carlists and organized the militia or the paramilitary units of the Carlists, the Requetés, into the formidable military organization that it became in the Spanish Civil War. Disguised as a priest, Uncle Pepe, he traveled along the Pyrenean villages organizing the people and readying them for war. He actively participated in conspiracy, both in plans for the Carlist-only rising and in the military plot which eventually triggered the Spanish Civil War. In April 1936, the government found out about his plotting and imprisoned him.

== The Civil War ==
In jail in Cadiz when the rising started, he was released on 18 July and helped secure Cadiz for the insurrection. He participated in many of the campaigns of the War including, Seville, Córdoba, Malaga, Extremadura, Tagus Valley, Alcázar, Madrid, Jarama, Brunete, Teruel and the Ebro.

== In Francoist Spain ==
Ending the war with the rank of major general, he was appointed minister of war in Franco's August 1939 government and was considered a representative of the Carlist faction there. During his ministry the Spanish army was purged of a small number of officers and NCOs who were considered politically unreliable.

Following the fall of France in 1940 and Hitler's subsequent overtures to Franco, Varela was anti-national socialist and a leading opponent of Spanish entry into the war on the Axis side, albeit he did endorse the Blue Division's participation on the Eastern Front fighting the Soviet Union.

As tensions between Carlists and Falangists within the government rose during 1942, Varela suggested to Franco that Carlists were underrepresented and proposed several schemes for a reorganization of the cabinet. Violence between the factions broke out at the Basilica of Begoña on 16 August 1942, when Falangists attacked a Carlist crowd with grenades, causing many injuries and possibly several deaths. Varela, who was inside the church at the time, took the initiative against the Falangists and portrayed the Begoña Bombing as an attack on the army and a possible assassination attempt in telegrams to officials throughout the country, displeasing Franco. In the following cabinet reshuffle in September, Varela was replaced as army minister by General Carlos Asensio Cabanillas.

In 1945 Franco appointed Varela as high commissioner of Spanish Morocco. He was later made captain-general of Madrid. He died of leukemia in 1951.

Franco subsequently granted Varela a posthumous marquisate title as Marquis of San Fernando de Varela. After his death he was also granted the title of Captain General of the Army, passed from the also deceased former dictator Miguel Primo de Rivera in 1951 (until 1952, when the title was granted also posthumously to the General Juan Yagüe). He is the only Spanish soldier to have risen from the rank of private to Captain General, the highest rank in the Army.

== Bibliography ==
- Guaita Martorell, Aurelio (1986). "Capitanes y capitanías generales". Revista de Administración Pública (111). Madrid: Centro de Estudios Políticos y Constitucionales: 7–50. ISSN 0034-7639.

Government offices
New title	Minister of the Army; 9 August 1939 – 3 September 1942	Succeeded by Carlos Asensio Cabanillas
Preceded by Luis Orgaz Yoldi	High Commissioner of the Spanish protectorate in Morocco; 4 March 1945 – 24 March 1951	Succeeded by Rafael García Valiño
Spanish nobility
New creation	Marquis of San Fernando de Varela; 1951	Succeeded by José Enrique Varela y Ampuero
