= Luis Orgaz Yoldi =

Spanish general (1881–1946)

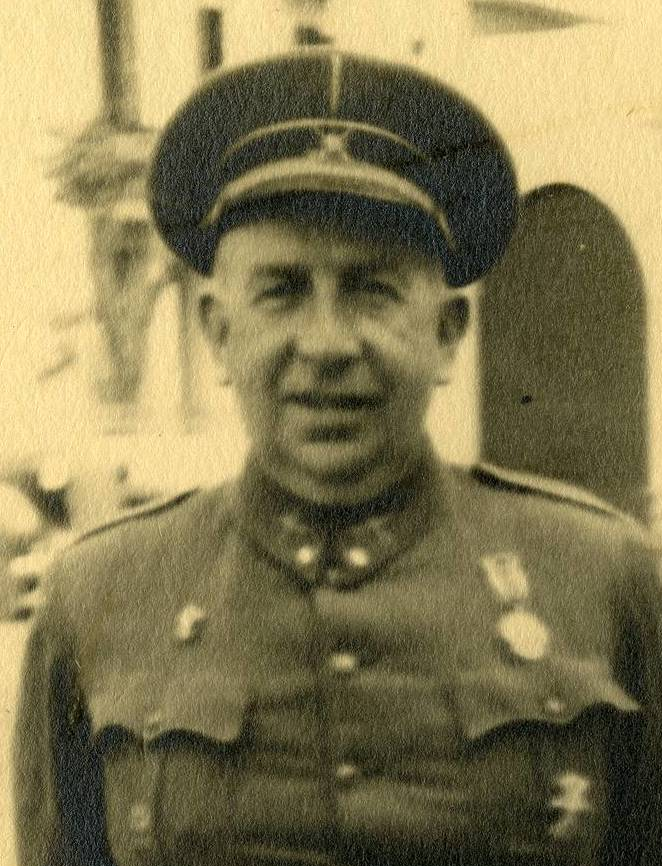
- Born: Luis Orgaz Yoldi; May 28, 1881; Vitoria-Gasteiz, Kingdom of Spain
- Died: January 31, 1946 (aged 64); Madrid, Francoist Spain
- Military career
- Allegiance: Spain
- Branch: Spanish Army
- Rank: Lieutenant general
- Commands: Canary Islands; Spanish Morocco
- Conflicts: Battle of Jarama

Luis Orgaz Yoldi (28 May 1881 in Vitoria-Gasteiz – 31 January 1946 in Madrid) was a Spanish general who was a leading figure of the Nationalist faction in the Spanish Civil War. He later went on to become a critic of the regime of Francisco Franco and agitated for the restoration of the monarchy.

== Early years ==
He took part in the action of the Barranco del Lobo in July 1909, during the Second Melillan campaign.

From his earliest days Orgaz was a staunch advocate of monarchism. As a consequence he was under a veil of suspicion during the tenure of Manuel Azaña, leading to Orgaz being placed under house arrest and then exiled in the Canary Islands in 1931. The suspicions were not groundless however as, like many leading monarchists in Spain at the time, Orgaz was involved in a number of plots aimed at a restoration. Close to General Emilio Mola, Orgaz was one of a number of leading officers who joined the general in conspiracy against the Popular Front government in early 1936.

== Civil war ==
Following the outbreak of the Civil War he was placed in command of the Nationalist forces in the Canary Islands. During the early stages of the Civil War he was one of the first leading figures to echo Alfredo Kindelán's calls for a single leader for the Nationalist side. He was also quick to indicate his support for Francisco Franco for the role. Indeed, along with Kindelán, Nicolas Franco, José Millán Astray and, from 1937, Ramón Serrano Súñer, Orgaz formed a central part of Franco's most trusted confidantes in the early part of the war.

In December 1936 Orgaz was moved to command of the Central Front, although an early attempt to attack Republican positions was a failure due to the significant numerical advantage enjoyed by the International Brigades in the area. A renewed offensive along the same lines in January 1937 resulted in a stalemate. He had official command at the Battle of Jarama although in reality the orders to keep pressing, which resulted in extensive loss of life for both sides, came direct from Franco. With the Italians highly critical of the command at Jarama Franco moved to placate them by relieving Orgaz of his command in favour of Andrés Saliquet Zumeta.

However the move was more cosmetic than a rebuke to Orgaz; Franco's faithful lieutenant quickly regained influence when he was tasked with organising the mass army required for the conflict. As a consequence he led a massive recruitment drive during the early months of 1937.

== Monarchist conspiracy ==
When Franco assumed control he named Orgaz as high commissioner (Alto Comisario) and commander in chief in Spanish Morocco. However the two drifted apart and by 1941 Orgaz was openly discussing the possibility of military action against Franco, having realised that he had no intention of restoring the monarchy. By March 1942 rumours were rife that he, Kindelan and General Eugenio Espinosa de los Monteros were on the verge of launching a monarchist coup. Events got so far that in August 1943 he intimated to Pedro Sainz Rodríguez that he was ready to lead 100,000 men in open rebellion as long as the faction around Infante Juan, Count of Barcelona that Sainz led could ensure recognition from the Allies.

Uncertain of how much support he had Orgaz abandoned his coup plans and instead took the lead in an army petition to Franco calling for restoration, presented on 13 September 1943 by General José Enrique Varela. His change of position had also been heavily influenced by Franco pointing out to him that he had a dossier detailing a number of corrupt deals that Orgaz had brokered in North Africa, revelations that could potentially ruin the conspiratorial general.

== Final years ==
Orgaz was promoted to the position of Chief of the Defence High Command (Alto Estado Mayor, AEM), i.e., chief of staff of the Spanish Armed Forces, immediately after World War II as Franco made a number of appointments designed to bring potential enemies back into the fold. However he managed less than a year in the position before his death in early 1946. His grandson, Luis Javier Benavides Orgaz, became a labor lawyer and member of the illegal Communist Party of Spain (PCE), and was one of the victims of the 1977 Atocha massacre.

Government offices
Preceded by Francisco Franco	High Commissioner of the Spanish protectorate in Morocco; 2 October 1936 – March 1937	Succeeded by Juan Luis Beigbeder y Atienza
Preceded by Carlos Asensio Cabanillas	High Commissioner of the Spanish protectorate in Morocco; 12 May 1941 – 4 March 1945	Succeeded by José Enrique Varela
Military offices
Preceded by Fidel Dávila Arrondo	Chief of the Defence High Command; 19 October 1945 – 31 January 1946	Succeeded by Juan Vigón
