= Juan Moles =

Spanish jurist, lawyer and politician (1871–1945)

Juan Moles Ormella
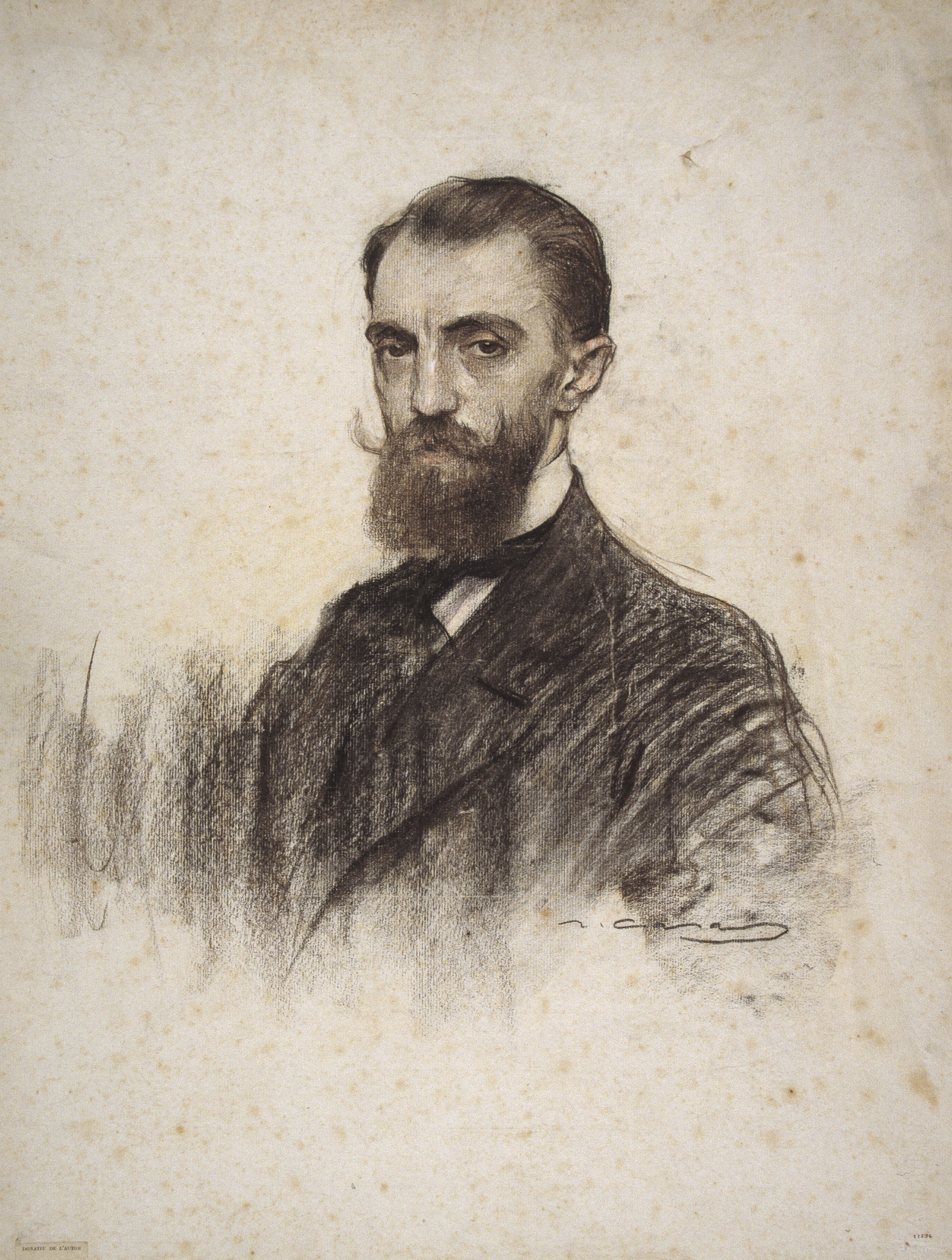

President of the Government of Catalonia
- In office 17 February – 1 March 1936
- Succeeded by: Lluís Companys

Civil Governor of Barcelona
- In office 4 January 1932 – 26 January 1933

High Commissioner of Spain in Morocco
- In office January 23, 1933 – January 25, 1934
- President: Niceto Alcalá-Zamora
- Preceded by: Luciano López Ferrer
- Succeeded by: Manuel Rico Avello

Personal details
- Born: 25 June 1871 Vila de Gràcia
- Died: 10 January 1943/1945 Mexico City

Juan Moles Ormella (25 June 1871 – 10 January1943/1945) was a Spanish lawyer and politician. During the Second Republic he held various positions in the administration, such as High Commissioner of Spain in Morocco or Minister of the Interior. After the end of the civil war he went into exile in Mexico.

== Biography ==
=== Early career ===
Born in Vila de Gràcia in a family of Lleida origin, he graduated in Law at the University of Barcelona in 1895. He was successively a member of the Republican Union, the Republican Nationalist Centre and the Republican Nationalist Federal Union. He was deputy mayor of the Barcelona City Council in 1901 and deputy in Congress, as an independent on the lists of Catalan Solidarity, for the district of Lleida in the general elections of 1907 and 1910 and was appointed senator in 1914 for the province of Lleida, thanks to an alliance between republicans, reformists and Catalanists of the Regionalist League. Later he was dean of the Barcelona Bar Association, executor of Jacint Verdaguer, and again deputy in the elections of 1918 and 1919. He also collaborated in the republican newspaper of Barcelona La Publicidad. During the dictatorship of Primo de Rivera he supported the opposition from his office, defending in court those involved in the Garraf plot and opposing the attempts to confiscate the family patrimony of Francesc Macià.

=== Under the Second Republic ===
During the Second Spanish Republic, he held various positions during the progressive biennium and during the governments supported by the Popular Front. Thus, he was civil governor of Barcelona between 1932 and 1933, high commissioner of Spain in Morocco from 1933 to 1934 and, after the elections of February 1936, governor general of Catalonia and interim president of the Generalitat of Catalonia from 17 February to 1 March 1936, being responsible for the transfer of powers to Lluís Companys once the institution was fully restored. After his work in Catalonia, he was again appointed high commissioner in Morocco, but when he became president of the Council of Santiago Casares Quiroga in May he was appointed Minister of the Interior, a post he held from 13 May to 18 July 1936.

Considered a "mummy of provincial republicanism at the beginning of the century" by Joaquín Maurín, some authors have pointed out its shortcomings when it comes to stopping the civic-military conspiracy against the Republic. He remained in the Republican zone during the Civil War, although without having any political prominence. After the end of the war he went into exile in France in Ille-sur-Têt to go to Mexico in April 1942, where he published a study on Jacint Verdaguer. He died in 1945 or 1943.

== Bibliography ==
- Pennell, C.R. (2000). Morocco Since 1830. A History. Lodon: C. Hurst & Co.
- Urquijo Goitia, José Ramón (2008). Gobiernos y ministros españoles en la edad contemporánea [Spanish Governments and Ministers in the Contemporary Age] (in Spanish). Madrid: CSIC.
- Víctor, Alba (1975). Dos revolucionarios: Joaquín Maurín, Andreu Nin (in Spanish). Seminarios y Ediciones.
- Thomas, Hugh (1976). Historia de la Guerra Civil Española [History of the Spanish Civil War] (in Spanish). Barcelona: Círculo de Lectores.
