= Rafael García Valiño =

Spanish general (1898–1972)

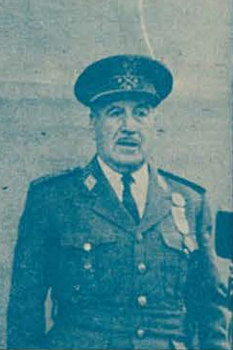
- García in 1964
- Born: Rafael García Valiño; 24 October 1898; Colunga, Kingdom of Spain
- Died: 29 June 1972 (aged 73); Madrid, Francoist Spain
- Military career
- Allegiance: Kingdom of Spain; Spanish Republic; Nationalist Spain
- Branch: Spanish Army
- Rank: General
- Conflicts: Rif War; Spanish Civil War; Invasion of Val d'Aran

Rafael García Valiño (24 October 1898 – 29 June 1972) was a Spanish army officer who fought in the Spanish Civil War for the Nationalist faction.

== Early life ==
He was born in Toledo, and enrolled in the Infantry Academy at age fifteen. In 1916, he earned his commission as a lieutenant, volunteering to fight in the Spanish Army of Africa. In Morocco, he was wounded several times and was promoted to major due to his field performance. In 1935, he studied in the Superior Military School.

== Spanish Civil War ==
The outbreak of the Civil War surprised him, as he was spending the summer on the Basque coast. He crossed Republican lines to reach Pamplona to join up with the Nationalist Army of the North, led by Emilio Mola. He commanded several Carlist units, and with the 1st Brigade of Navarre participated in the campaign of the North. After he was promoted to colonel, he commanded the 1st Division of Navarre, with which he fought in Teruel and in the campaign of Aragon, along with those of Aranda, to the Mediterranean, thus cutting the Republican zone in two. He also commanded an army corps in the XYZ battle, in the Battle of Ebro and participated in the offensive of Catalonia. He led the Maestrazgo Army in the final offensive of the Spanish Civil War.

== Francoist Spain ==
After the Civil War, he was named commander-in-chief of Melilla. In 1942, he became Chief of Staff of the Army. In 1944, he participated in the fighting against the Valle de Aran's invasion by the Spanish Maquis. In 1947, he was promoted to lieutenant general and in charge of the captainship of the VII Military district. From 1951 to 1956, he was High Commissioner of the Spanish protectorate in Morocco. In 1957, he was named director of the Superior School of the Army and, later, commander in chief of the First Military district, a position that he occupied until 1964.

In 1965, he established Air Spain together with the Banco del Noroeste and his relatives José Maria Rivero de Aguilar and Colonel Carbó.

== Sources ==
- Beevor, Antony (2006). The Battle for Spain: The Spanish Civil War 1936–1939. London: Penguin Books. ISBN 978-0-14-303765-1.
- Thomas, Hugh (2001). The Spanish Civil War. London: Penguin Books. ISBN 978-0-14-101161-5.

Military offices
Preceded by Carlos Asensio Cabanillas	Chief of Staff of the Army; 4 September 1942 – 24 March 1950	Succeeded by Fernando Barron
Government offices
Preceded by José Enrique Varela	High Commissioner of the Spanish protectorate in Morocco; 24 March 1951 – 7 April 1956	Independence of Morocco
