= Felipe Alfau Mendoza =

Spanish military officer

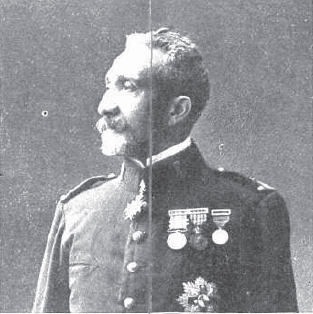
- Photographed by Christian Franzen
- Born: 1845 or 1848; Santo Domingo, Dominican Republic
- Died: 1937; Casablanca, French Morocco
- Branch: Spanish Army

Felipe Alfau Mendoza (c. 1845/1848 – 1937) was a Spanish military officer. He served as the first Spanish High Commissioner in Morocco and as Captain-General of Catalonia.

== Biography ==
Born in Santo Domingo, (Note: Sources mention either 1845 or 25 September 1848 as birthdate.) son to the Dominican trinitario Felipe Benicio Alfau and Rosa Josefa Mendoza Pineda. Leader of the first brigade of Jägers of Melilla, he was promoted to division general in 1910.

After the 1912 Treaty of Fes and the entry in Tétouan of the Spanish forces commanded by Alfau on 19 February 1913, he became the first High Commissioner of the newly created Spanish protectorate in Morocco on 5 April 1913. He left the post on 15 August 1913, when he was replaced by José Marina Vega.

Later, he was appointed as Captain General of Catalonia, in 1915. Alfau—who, according Francisco J. Romero Salvadó did not take the Defence Juntas seriously— was fired on 27 May 1916 in the context of the 1917 military crisis, and was replaced again by the General Marina.

He died in Casablanca in 1937.

== Decorations ==
- Grand Cross of the Royal and Military Order of Saint Hermenegildo (1908)
- Grand Cross of the Order of Military Merit (1910)
- Grand Cross of the Military Order of María Cristina (1910)
