= Eduardo Sáenz de Buruaga =

Spanish military officer

- Born: Eduardo Sáenz de Buruaga y Polanco; 1893; Camagüey, Cuba, Kingdom of Spain
- Died: 17 February 1964 (aged 70–71); Madrid, Spanish State
- Military career
- Allegiance: Nationalist Spain
- Branch: Spanish Army
- Conflicts: Spanish Civil War

Eduardo Sáenz de Buruaga y Polanco (1893 – 17 February 1964) was a prominent Spanish military officer from the Army of Africa and recipient of the Military Medal of Spain along with numerous others military decorations. During the Spanish Civil War, Colonel Sáenz de Buruaga backed General Franco and led elements of the Nationalist Army in the key battles of the Corunna Road, the Jarama, and Teruel.

In 1910 Sáenz de Buruaga enrolled at the Toledo Infantry Academy (Academia de Infantería de Toledo) and studied under Colonel José Villalba Riquelme. Rising in support of Franco's pronunciamiento of 17–18 July 1936, Sáenz de Buruaga's and Colonel Asensio's troops seized Tetuán in Spanish Morocco for the military rebels and imprisoned the Spanish High Commissioner. Franco promoted him to full general during the Battle of the Ebro. After the war Sáenz de Buruaga served terms as Captain General of Seville, the Balearic Islands; and Governor of Madrid and the comarca of the Campo de Gibraltar.

Sáenz de Buruaga is responsible for ruthless massacres of loyalists in the early period of the Spanish Civil War, including the Massacre of Baena, where about 700 loyalists were murdered by his orders. Other estimates mention up to 2,000 victims following the brutal repression in Baena.

== See also ==
- White Terror (Spain)
