= Spanish protectorate in Morocco =

1912–1956 Spanish protectorate in northwest Africa

Coordinates: 35.0000°N 4.5000°W

Spanish Protectorate in Morocco Protectorado español en Marruecos (Spanish) الحماية الإسبانية في المغرب (Arabic)
- 1912–1956
- Merchant ensign Coat of arms

- Map of the protectorate's northern zone (Spanish Morocco proper) and southern zone (Cape Juby)

- Map of the northern zone in 1956
- Status: Protectorate of Spain
- Capital: Tetuán
- Common languages: Spanish (official); Berber; Arabic; Tetuani or Haketia
- Religion: Islam (majority); Catholicism; Judaism
- Government: Absolute monarchy (under protectorate)
- Sultan
  - 1912–1927: Yusef
  - 1927–1956: Mohammed V
- High Commissioner
  - 1913 (first): Felipe Alfau Mendoza
  - 1951–1956 (last): Rafael García Valiño
- Historical era: Interwar period
  - Treaty of Madrid: 27 November 1912
  - Rif War: June 1921 – May 1926
  - Nationalist uprising: July 1936
  - Occupation of Tangier: June 1940 – October 1945
  - Retroceded to Morocco: 7 April 1956
- Currency: Spanish peseta
Preceded by	Succeeded by
Alawi Sultanate; Republic of the Rif	Kingdom of Morocco

The Spanish Protectorate in Morocco (Note: Arabic: حماية إسبانيا في المغرب Ḥimāyat Isbāniyā fi-l-Mağrib; Spanish: Protectorado español de Marruecos, Spanish pronunciation: [pɾoteɣtoˈɾaðo espaˈɲol de maˈrwekos]) was established on 27 November 1912 by a treaty between France and Spain that converted the Spanish sphere of influence in Morocco, then under French protection, into a formal Spanish protectorate.

The Spanish protectorate consisted of a northern strip on the Mediterranean and the Strait of Gibraltar, and a southern part of the protectorate around Cape Juby, bordering the Spanish Sahara. The northern zone became part of independent Morocco on 7 April 1956, shortly after France relinquished its protectorate. Spain finally ceded its southern zone through the Treaty of Angra de Cintra on 1 April 1958, after the short Ifni War. The city of Tangier was excluded from the Spanish protectorate and received a special internationally controlled status as Tangier International Zone.

Since France already held a protectorate over most of the country and had controlled Morocco's foreign affairs since 30 March 1912, it also held the power to delegate a zone to Spanish protection.

The surface area of the Protectorate was about 20,000 km^{2} (7,722 sq mi).

== History ==
=== Background ===
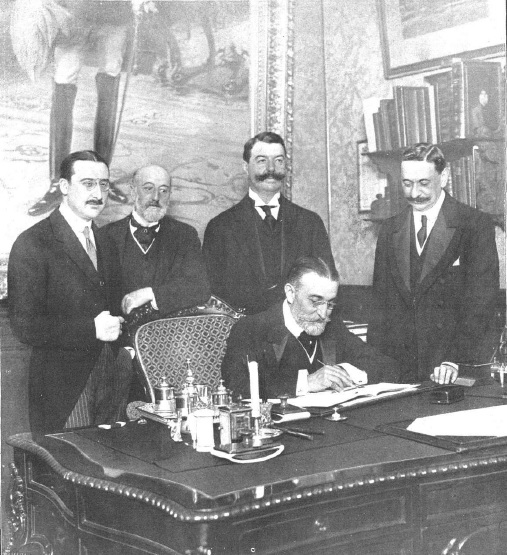
Moment of the signing of the Treaty by which the Spanish Protectorate was created, 27 November, 1912

In the late 19th century, Spain was losing most of the last remnants of its once global empire following the Spanish–American War. However, their government found it necessary to show an active interest in expansion in northern Morocco. That country, if only because of its geographical position and the presence of the presidios of Ceuta, and Melilla, could not be ignored by the Spaniards despite their lack of enthusiasm for new colonial enterprises, with the exception of the enthusiastic pro-colonial africanista party of which King Alfonso XIII was a proponent.

During the last decades of the 19th century, Spain observed the increasing interference of Britain and France in the region. The most coherently expressed reason for intervention was fear for the strategic security of Spain. Among others, the Liberal leader Montero Ríos stated that if northwestern Morocco were to come under the civil or military protectorate of France, Spain would see itself besieged perpetually in the north and south by the same power. Furthermore, recent finds of iron ore near Melilla convinced many that Morocco contained vast mineral wealth.

The key motivation for intervention, although less openly stated, was the belief that Morocco was Spain's last chance to maintain its position in the Concert of Europe, as it was the one area in which it could claim sufficient interest to generate some diplomatic strength with respect to the European powers. There was also the then-widespread belief in Europe that colonies increased a nation's prestige. Those beliefs encouraged Spanish politicians to adopt a forward policy in Morocco.

=== Formation ===
In a convention dated 27 June 1900 (at the same time as Treaty of Paris (1900)), France and Spain agreed to recognize separate zones of influence in Morocco, but did not specify their boundaries. In 1902, France offered Spain all of Morocco north of the Sebou River and south of the Sous River, but Spain declined in the belief that such a division would offend Britain. The British and French, without any Spanish insistence, acknowledged Spain's right to a zone of influence in Morocco in Article 8 of the Entente cordiale of 8 April 1904:

The two Governments, inspired by their feeling of sincere friendship for Spain, take into special consideration the interests which that country derives from her geographical position and from her territorial possessions on the Moorish coast of the Mediterranean. In regard to these interests the French Government will come to an understanding with the Spanish Government. The agreement which may be come to on the subject between France and Spain shall be communicated to His Britannic Majesty's Government.

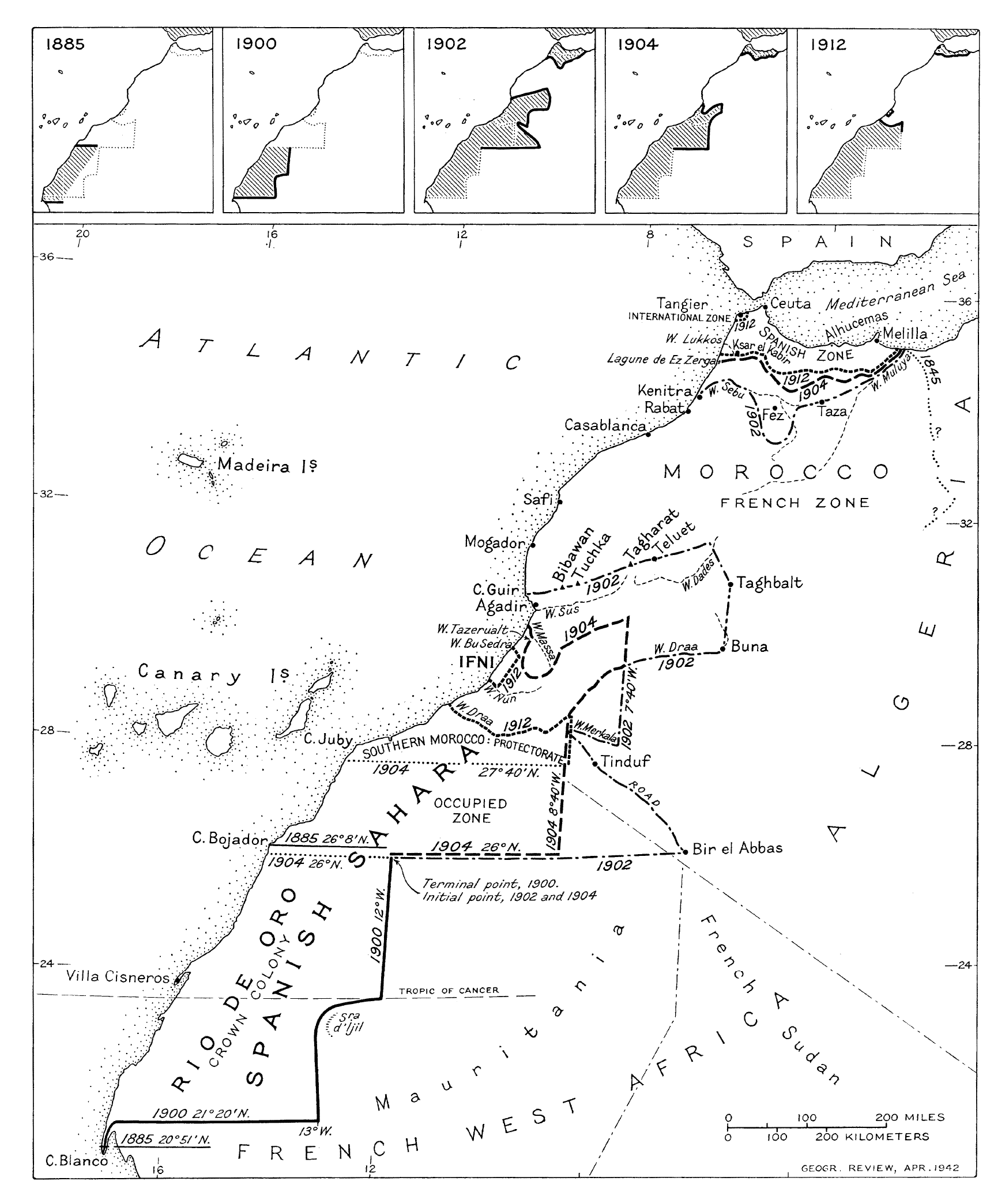
Spanish territorial boundary changes in Northwest Africa per the treaties of 1885, 1900, 1902, 1904, and 1912.

What exactly "special consideration" meant was dealt with in the secret third and fourth articles, specifying that Spain would be required to recognize Articles 4 and 7 of the treaty but could decline the "special consideration" if it wished:

The two Governments agree that a certain extent of Moorish territory adjacent to Melilla, Ceuta, and other presides should, whenever the Sultan ceases to exercise authority over it, come within the sphere of influence of Spain, and that the administration of the coast from Melilla as far as, but not including, the heights on the right bank of the Sebou shall be entrusted to Spain.

The British goal in these negotiations with France was to ensure that a weaker power (Spain) held the strategic coast opposite Gibraltar in return for Britain ceding all their influence in Morocco. France began negotiating with Spain at once, but the offer of 1902 was no longer on the table. Since France had given up its ambitions in Ottoman Libya in a convention with Italy in 1903, it felt entitled to a greater share of Morocco. On 3 October 1904, France and Spain concluded a treaty that defined their precise zones. Spain received a zone of influence consisting of a northern strip of territory and a southern strip. The northern strip did not reach to the border of French Algeria, nor did it include Tangier, soon to be internationalized. The southern strip represented the southernmost part of Morocco as recognized by the European powers: the territory to its south, Saguia el-Hamra, was recognized by France as an exclusively Spanish zone. The treaty also recognized the Spanish exclave of Ifni and delimited its borders.

In March 1905, Kaiser Wilhelm II of Germany visited Tangier. There he loudly touted Germany's economic interests in Morocco and assured Sultan Abd el Aziz of financial assistance in the event of a threat to Moroccan independence. At Wilhelm's urging, Abd el Aziz called for an international conference. The final act of the Algeciras Conference (7 April 1906) created the State Bank of Morocco, guaranteed the attending powers equal commercial rights in Morocco, and created a native Moroccan police force led by French and Spanish officers. However, it ultimately saw the Powers call Germany’s bluff when all involved powers other than Austria-Hungary sided with France either overtly (Russia) or otherwise (Great Britain, Spain, Italy) having negotiated in the previous decades various alliances or informal agreements with France.

The final Spanish zone of influence consisted of a northern strip and a southern strip centered on Cape Juby. The consideration of the southern strip as part of the protectorate back in 1912 eventually gave Morocco a solid legal claim to the territory in the 1950s. While the sparsely populated Cape Juby region was administered as a single entity with Spanish Sahara, the northern territories were administered, separately, as a Spanish protectorate with its capital at Tetuán.

The Protectorate system was established in 1912 by the Treaty of Fes after the Agadir Crisis, caused by the German gunboat Panther’s visit in 1911 . The Islamic legal system of qadis was formally maintained.

=== Rif War ===
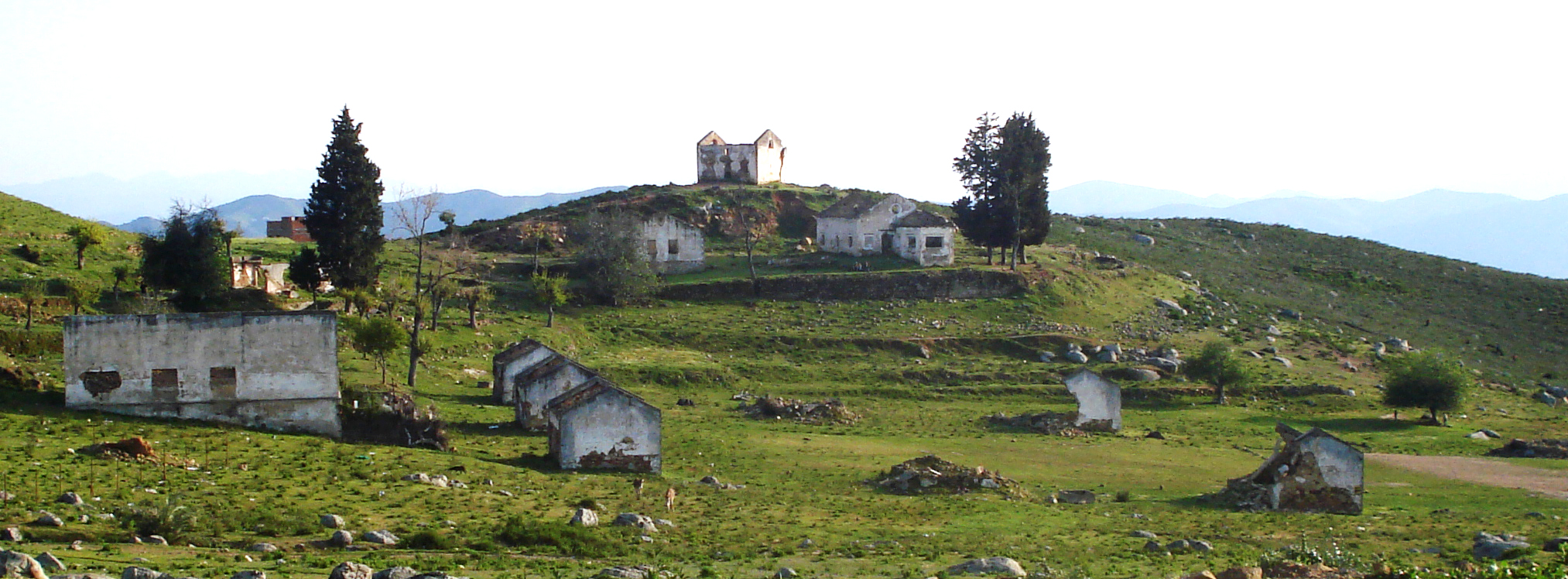
Ruins of a Spanish camp near Chefchaouen.

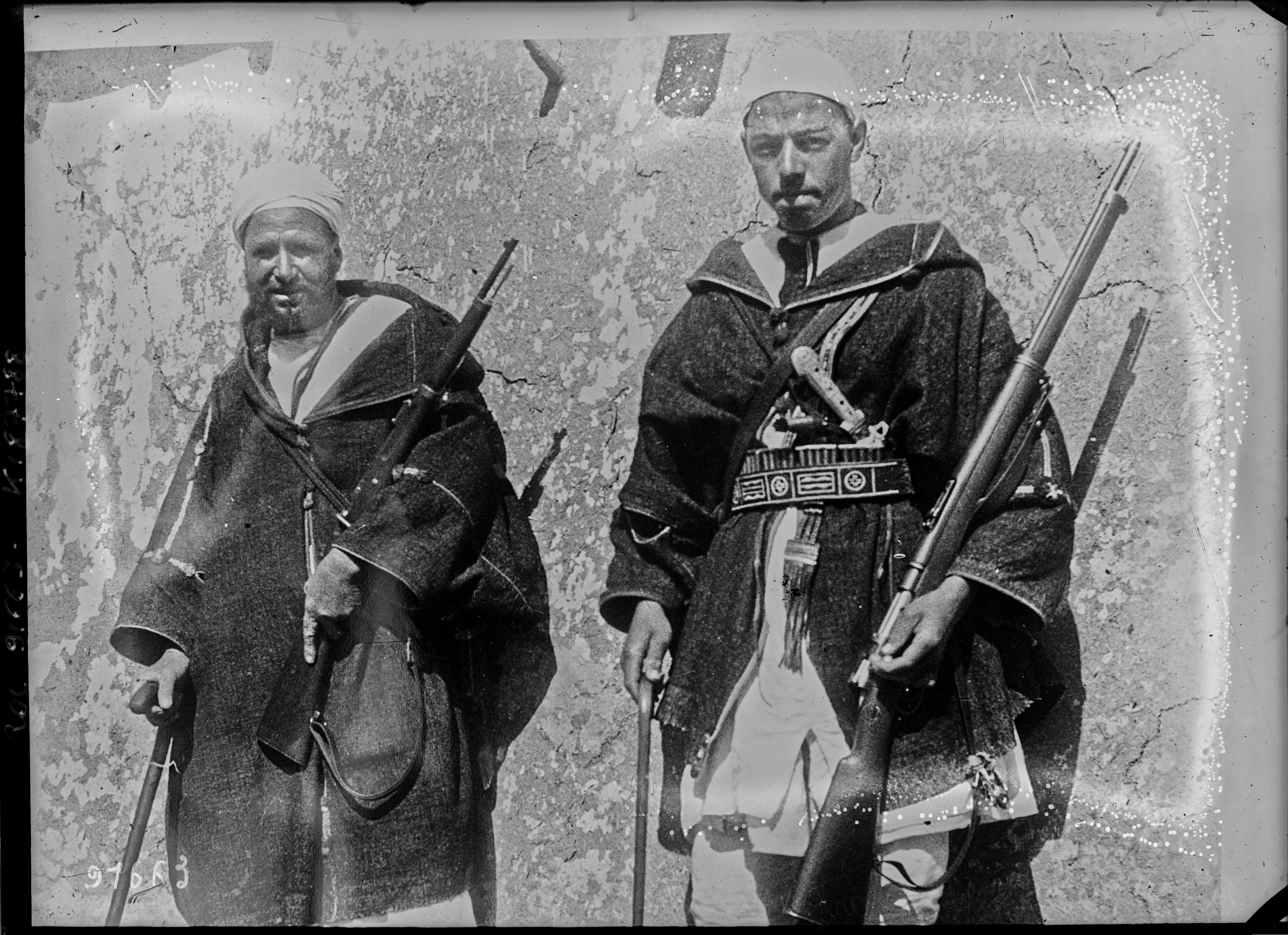
Berbers carrying captured rifles during Rif war, including a Mauser 1893 and a French Berthier carbine

Since the beginning of the protectorates the French and Spanish had been in a tough struggle to maintain the fiction of colonial rule in the mountainous interior, and from the time of the First World War, the Republic of the Rif, led by the guerrilla leader Abd el-Krim, was a breakaway state that existed from 1921 to 1926 in the Rif region, when it was subdued and dissolved by a joint expedition of the Spanish Army of Africa and French forces during the Rif War.

The Spanish lost more than 13,000 soldiers at Annual in July–August 1921. Controversy in Spain over the early conduct in the war was a driving factor behind the unpopularity of Alfonso XIII, who had urged the attack and had stayed golfing in France when news of the defeat reached him, seeming callous to the loss. It led to a politically unstable situation that led to the military coup by General Miguel Primo de Rivera in September of 1923 which despite Primo de Rivera’s abandonista (anti-colonial commitments) position, ultimately defeated the Riffian revolt when Abd El-Krim’s attack on the French zone in 1925 allowed them to work with the Spanish to organise the decisive joint air and amphibious landings at Alhucemas.

After the successful 1925 Alhucemas landing, the French–Spanish alliance ended up achieving victory and putting an end to the war. The Spanish consolidated their zone, garrisoning it by recruiting Moroccan tribesmen as regulares in the Army of Africa, Spain’s professional standing army in Africa, and with the Foreign Legion (founded in 1920 on the French model). In 1925 the city of Tangier became an International Zone by agreement of the Powers, with an administrator appointed by the Sultan, usually a Frenchman.

=== Second Spanish Republic ===
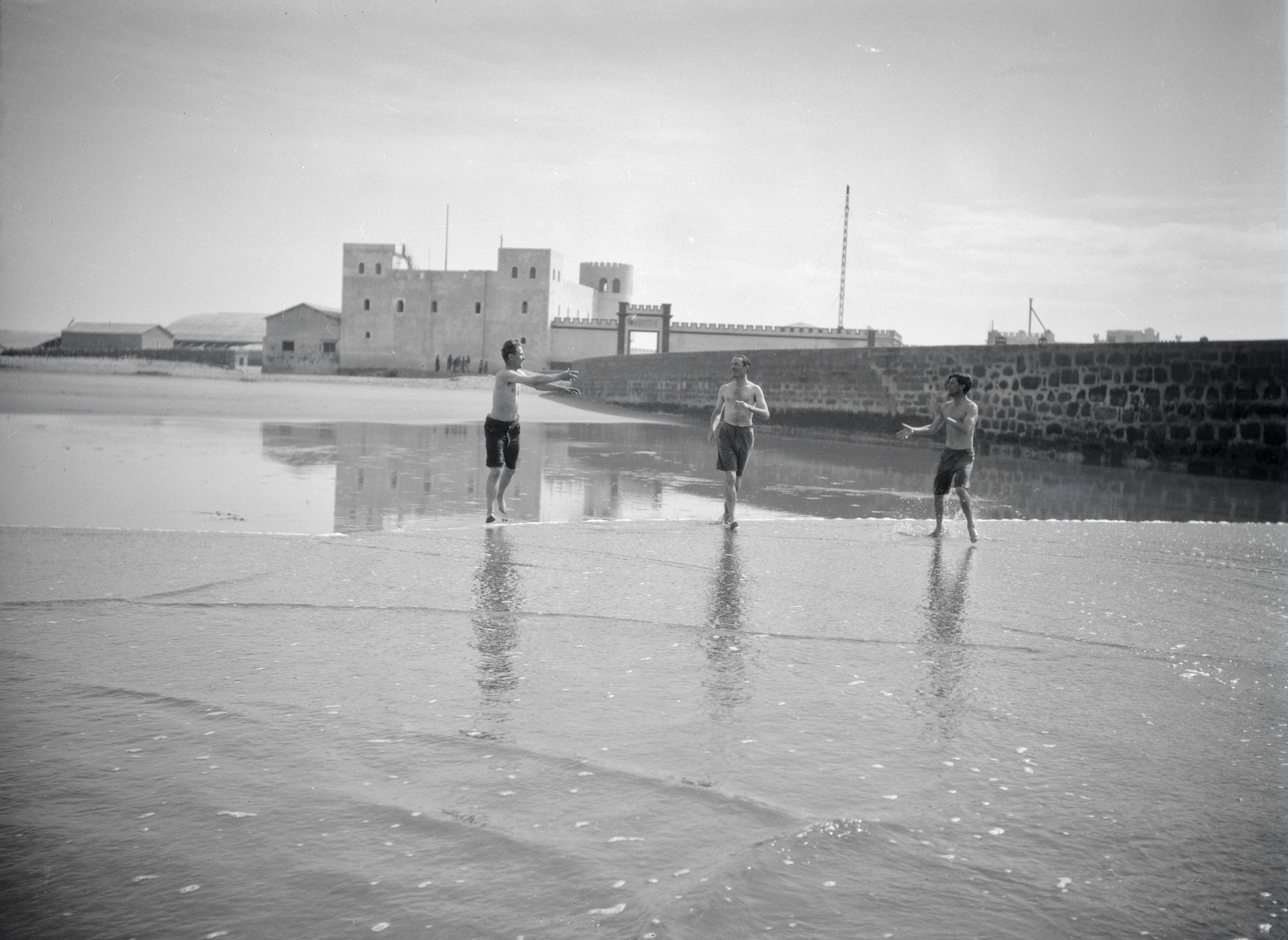
Walter Mittelholzer's traveling companions playing ball on the beach of Cape Juby, image between 1930 and 1931.

Before 1934, the southern part of the protectorate (Tekna) had been governed from Cape Juby (within the same southern strip) since 1912; Cape Juby was also the seat of Spanish West Africa. Then, in 1934, the southern part began to being managed directly from Tetuán (in the northern part of the protectorate) and the seat of Spanish West Africa was moved from Cape Juby to the territory of Ifni (not a part of the protectorate), which had been occupied by the Spaniards that year only, but had been by treaty allocated to Spain since 1860.

=== Spanish Civil War ===
The Spanish Civil War started in 1936 with the partially successful coup against the Republican Government, which began in Spanish Morocco in Llano Amarillo (Issaguen) by an uprising of the Spanish Army of Africa stationed there, although within a day uprisings in Spain itself broke out. This force, which included a considerable number of Moroccan troops (regulares), was under the command of Francisco Franco (who spent much time in Morocco) and became the core of the Spanish Nationalist Army. The Communist Party of Spain and Workers' Party of Marxist Unification (POUM), advocated anti-colonial policies, and pressured the Republican government to support the independence of Spanish Morocco, intending to create a rebellion at Franco's back and cause disaffection among his Moroccan troops. The government – then led by the Spanish Socialist Workers' Party (PSOE) — rejected that course of action as it would have likely resulted in conflict with France, the colonial ruler of the other portion of Morocco.

Because the locally recruited Muslim regulares had been among Franco's most effective troops, the protectorate enjoyed more political freedom and autonomy than Francoist Spain-proper after Franco's victory. The area held competing political parties and a Moroccan nationalist press, which often criticized the Spanish government.

=== World War II ===
Spanish troops provisionally occupied Tangier during World War II, on the pretext that an Italian invasion was imminent.

=== Retrocession to Morocco ===
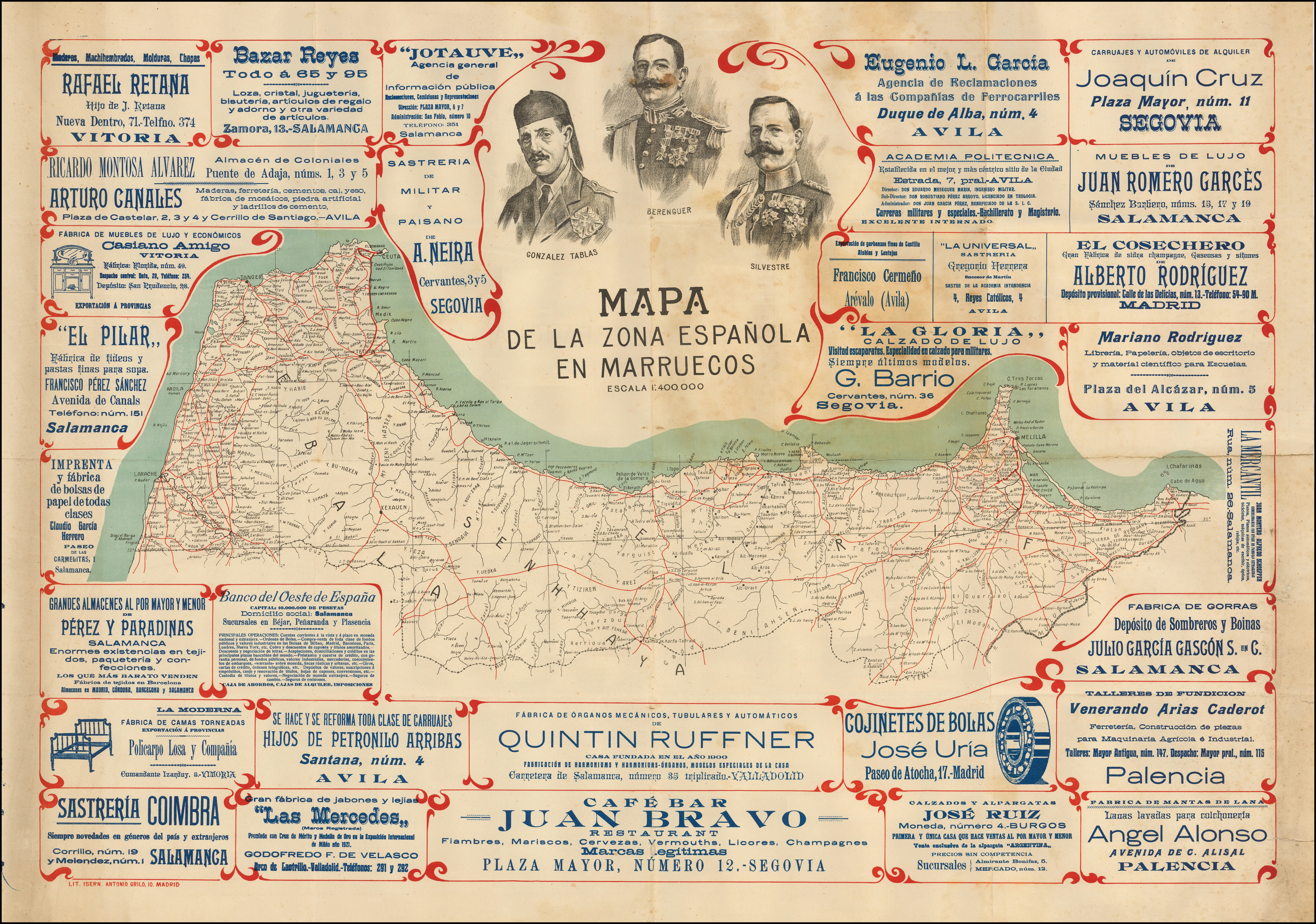
1920 map of the "Spanish zone in Morocco", with images of Santiago Tablas, Dámaso Berenguer and Manuel Fernández.

In 1956, when France ended its protectorate over Morocco, Spain discontinued the protectorate and retroceded the territory to the newly independent kingdom, while retaining the plazas de soberanía which were part of Spain prior to the colonial period, Cape Juby, Ifni, and other colonies (such as Spanish Sahara) outside of Morocco. Unwilling to accept this, the Moroccan Army of Liberation waged war against the Spanish forces. In the 1958 Ifni War, which spread from Sidi Ifni to Río de Oro, Morocco gained Tarfaya (the southern part of the protectorate) and reduced the Spanish control of the Ifni territory to the perimeter of the city itself. Morocco and Spain negotiated for over a year over Ifni, with Morocco also wanting control of Ceuta and Melilla, while Spain was only willing to give up control of Ifni. On 5 January 1969 Morocco and Spain signed the treaty ceding Ifni to Morocco.

Morocco still claims Ceuta and Melilla as integral parts of the country, and considers them to be under foreign occupation, comparing their status to that of Gibraltar. Spain considers both cities integral parts of the Spanish geography, since they were part of Spain for centuries.

== Economy ==
=== Mines ===
The iron mines in the Rif were one of the sources of income. Their exploitation led to an economic boom in Melilla.

=== Transport ===
After the Treaty of Algeciras signed in April 1906, where the northern part of Morocco was placed under Spanish administration, the Spanish started to develop this mineral-rich area, and numerous narrow gauge railways were built.

== Administration ==
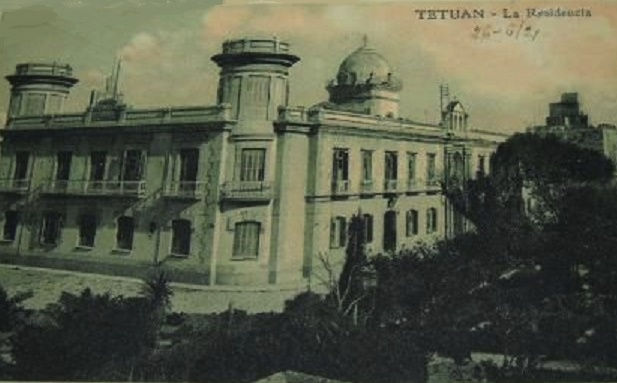
Residence of the Spanish High Commissioner in Tétouan, ca. 1920; absorbed in the late 1950s into the Royal Palace of Tétouan

French and Spanish protectorates in Morocco from 1912 until 1956

The administrative regime of the Protectorate is derived from the concept of protectorate itself, with a formal duality of authorities. On the one hand, there is a Moroccan administration, headed by a Khalifa (Spanish: Jalifa), who exercised, by delegation of the Sultan, all his powers, mainly the legislative, which he exercised through the dahir (decree). He was also the highest religious authority. This government led by the Khalifa received the name of Makhzen and was divided into departments, like ministries, coordinated by the Grand Vizier. The ministers were the qadi al-qudat (chief or judge of judges), the Vizier of the Habus (inalienable patrimony whose income is destined to a pious or religious work or institution), the amin al-amlak and the amin al-umana (minister of Finance). It had an advisory council made up of two representatives from each of the five regions. The Khalifa was chosen by the Sultan from a pair proposed by the Spanish government. The first Khalifa was Mohammed Mehedi Ould Ben Ismael. Ishmael was the brother of Sultan Hassan I and later Sultan Hassan I was the great-uncle of the second Khalifa. The first Khalifa took office in Tetouan on 27 April 1913. Only two Khalifas held office until the independence of Morocco, Muley el Mehdi (between 1913 and 1923) and his son Muley el Hassán bin el Mehdi (who took office at the age of thirteen, ruling between 1925 and 1941 and 1945 and 1956).

The Spanish administration was led by a High Commissioner, formally accredited to the Khalifa but in fact the highest authority in the Protectorate. The High Commissary directed the political action of Spain in the Protectorate, and orders and instructions emanated from it. The high commissioner was assisted by various departments (Indigenous Affairs Development and Finance). There was a territorial controller in each of the regions, directly represented to the Delegation of Indigenous Affairs. Subordinate to him, there was a next level, with regional auditors and, finally, local auditors. The maintenance of order was in charge of the Regulares (forces of the Spanish army with "indigenous" Rif people) and the Indigenous Police. On the military side, the high commissioner was assisted by three commanders based in Ceuta, Melilla and Larache.

The administrative organization was arranged, at a general level, in this way: The High Commissioner was responsible for the direction of the Spanish action in the entire area and all the authorities (including the military) were subordinate to him. Among its activities were to intervene in the acts of the Khalifa, the regime of the cities in which the consuls acted as controllers, to dictate the general policy and to approve or direct, where appropriate, military operations. The Indigenous services department was entrusted with the General Secretariat and advising on all matters relating to relations with the Kabyles, the inspection of the Islamic Justice Administration, relations with the Consular Jurisdiction for the protection of the natives and with the Sheriff for everything related to real estate and the vindication of property, the inspection of schools and health care centers and the Spanish missions in educational work.

In Morocco, there was no prior organization to ensure public health, except in Tangier, and the Spanish tried to remedy this deficiency, creating in 1916 the Health Inspectorate, within the Office of Indigenous Affairs. The Spanish had to overcome the distrust that Moroccans felt towards their healers and home remedies, carrying out large vaccination campaigns that contributed to the prestige of the protecting country. Along with health action, culture was the other pending subject for Moroccans, since teaching was closely linked to religion and consisted of memorizing the Quran. Spain entrusted the task of educating the population to the Delegation of Indigenous Affairs, which depended on a Board of Education that was created on 3 April 1913. This Board was born with the purpose of training the personnel who would be dedicated to this task and as an instrument to learn about geography, literature, history and the Moroccan law. To this end, a Center for Moroccan Studies was organized in the Free Institute of Diplomatic and Consular Careers and Arabic chairs were created in some business schools and an Arabic board was created in the Board for the Extension of Studies.

Subsequently, Indigenous Affairs offices were created in Melilla and Ceuta that exercised surveillance functions, somewhat similar, in the occupied regions. In 1937, in the middle of the Spanish Civil War, the territorial organization of Spanish Morocco was in charge of the High Commissioner of the Territory and a Lieutenant Colonel responsible for civil and military affairs.

The High Commissioner and the Khalifa had their respective residences in two adjacent palaces in Tétouan, which following Morocco's independence in 1956 have been merged into a single compound and repurposed as the Royal Palace of Tétouan.

== See also ==
- List of Spanish high commissioners in Morocco
- List of Spanish colonial wars in Morocco
- Regulares
- Spanish protectorate in Cambodia

== Sources ==
- Gangas Geisse, Mónica; Santis Arenas, Hernán (2011). "El conflicto del Sáhara Occidental" (PDF). Nadir: Revista Electrónica de Geografía Austral. 3 (1): 1–15.
- Merry del Val, Alfonso (1920a). "The Spanish Zones in Morocco". The Geographical Journal. 55 (5): 329–49. Bibcode:1920GeogJ..55..329D. doi:10.2307/1780445. JSTOR 1780445.
- Merry del Val, Alfonso (1920b). "The Spanish Zones in Morocco (Continued)". The Geographical Journal. 55 (6): 409–19. Bibcode:1920GeogJ..55..409D. doi:10.2307/1780966. JSTOR 1780966.
- Nadal, Francesc; Urteaga, Luis; Muro Morales, José Ignacio (2000). "El mapa topográfico del Protectorado de Marruecos en su contexto político e institucional (1923–1940)" (PDF). Documents d'Anàlisi Geogràfica. 36: 15–46.
- Pélissier, René (1965). "Spain's Discreet Decolonization". Foreign Affairs. 43 (3): 519–27. doi:10.2307/20039116. JSTOR 20039116.
- Pennell, C. R. (2001). Morocco since 1830: A History. London: Hurst.
- Vilar, Juan B. (2005). "Franquismo y descolonización española en África". Historia Contemporánea. 30. Bilbao: University of the Basque Country: 129–158. ISSN 1130-2402.
- Woolman, David S. (1968). Rebels in the Rif: Abd el Krim and the Rif Rebellion. Stanford, CA: Stanford University Press.
