= Capture of Ain Maatouf =

- Part of the Rif War
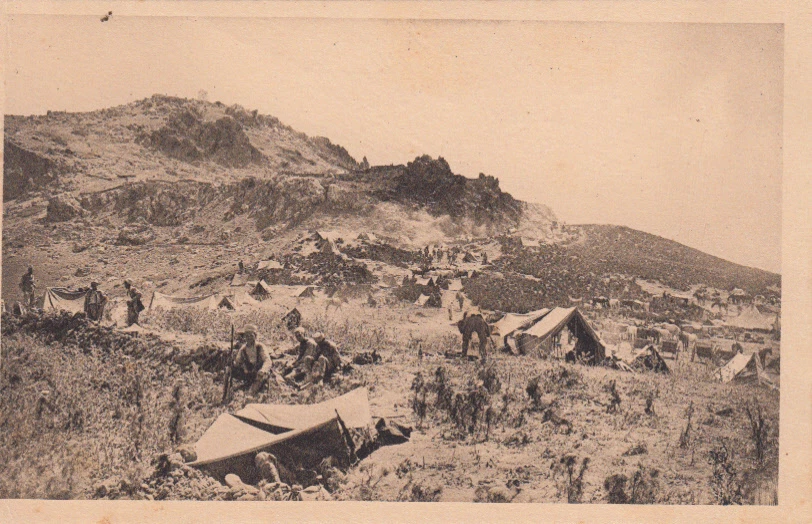
- French military camp of Ain Maatouf in 1925
Date	5 May 1925
Location	Ain Maatouf, Taounate Province, Morocco
Result	Tribal victory: Massacre of the French garrison

Belligerents
Republic of the Rif; Hyayna	France

Commanders and leaders
Unknown	Louis Berger † (during the recapture attempt)

Strength
Unknown	+60 soldiers and Senegalese Tirailleurs; First recapture attempt: 1 soldier 18 Senegalese Tirailleurs

Casualties and losses
5 mujahideen killed Unknown	Entire garrison killed or captured (except 1 soldier); First recapture attempt: 1 soldier killed 18 Senegalese Tirailleurs killed

The Capture of Ain Maatouf, also named the Battle of Ain Maatouf (in Arabic: معركة عين معطوف) in Moroccan historiography, was the invasion and capture of the French military camp in the village of Ain Maatouf, within the Hyayna tribe territory in the Taounate region, by Riffian and Hyayna Mujahideen. The assault resulted in the massacre of the French garrison during the Rif War.

== Background ==
Following the "pacification" of the tribes north of Fez, the Ain Maatouf military camp was established in August 1917 to monitor the region, which was prone to numerous revolts and attacks against French troops. The Ain Maatouf area had already experienced significant unrest, which intensified when the Riffians entered the war against the French, following France's intervention to support Spain during the Rif War.

== Course of the battle ==
On 5 May 1925, Riffian forces already stationed around the camp were joined by members of the Hyayna tribe who wished to offer their assistance. The tribal fighters surrounded the camp "like a bracelet around a wrist," taking advantage of the rocky slopes surrounding the positions. Following a long night during which the French troops attempted to defend themselves with artillery fire—killing five Riffians—the Mujahideen launched a dawn assault.

Using grenades to clear their way, they breached the barbed wire and defensive perimeters, overwhelming the French garrison. The Mujahideen (as they are referred to in Moroccan historiography) took full control of the camp, marking a major breakthrough against the French during the wider Battle of the Ouergha. The French soldiers present were massacred by the Riffians and Hayyanis, with only a single soldier managing to escape. Approximately sixty other prisoners were taken and sent to the rear base of Ghafsaï, then under the control of the Republic of the Rif.

== First recapture attempt ==
In an attempt to retake the camp on 12 May 1925, a lone French soldier, Louis Berger, along with 18 Senegalese Tirailleurs, attempted to recover the outpost. However, they were intercepted and engaged by tribal forces. The clash resulted in the deaths of Berger and all 18 Tirailleurs; their bodies were discovered several months later.

== Aftermath ==
The forces of the Republic of the Rif eventually lost control of the camp, which was recaptured and secured through several French relief expeditions. These included operations led by Commander Richard around June 1925, and more notably those under the command of General Noguès, who fought throughout the summer and autumn of 1925 to clear the rebels from the areas of Ain Maatouf, Qalaa des Sless, and Ain Aïcha.
