= Mkansa =

Mkansa may refer to:

- Lamkansa, Casablanca-Settat, a town in Nouaceur Province, Casablanca-Settat, Morocco
- Mkansa, Taounate Province, a commune in Taounate Province, Fès-Meknès, Morocco
- Demonym for people from Meknes
