= Bani Sanus =

Bani Sanus may refer to:

- Bani Sanus (Algeria), a town and commune in Tlemcen Province, Algeria
- Bani Sanus (Morocco), a commune in the Taounate Province, Morocco
