= Meknassa Al Gharbia =

Meknassa Al Gharbia مكناسة الغربية
- commune
- Location within Morocco
- Coordinates: 34°16′50″N 4°04′30″W
- Country: Morocco
- Region: Taza-Al Hoceima-Taounate
- Province: Taza

Population (2004)
  - Total: 4,070
- Time zone: UTC+0 (GMT)

Meknassa Al Gharbia is a commune in the Taza Province of the Taza-Al Hoceima-Taounate administrative region of Morocco. At the time of the 2004 census, the commune had a total population of 4070 people living in 657 households.
