= Oulad Ayyad =

Coordinates: 32°20′N 6°23′W

Oulad Ayyad أولاد عياد
- commune
- Interactive map of Oulad Ayyad
- Country: Morocco
- Region: Taza-Al Hoceima-Taounate
- Province: Taounate

Population (2004)
  - Total: 8,896
- Time zone: UTC+0 (GMT)

Oulad Ayyad is a commune in the Taounate Province of the Taza-Al Hoceima-Taounate administrative region of Morocco. At the time of the 2004 census, the commune had a total population of 8896 people living in 1386 households.
