= Bouchfaa =

Bouchfaa بوشفاعة
- commune
- Interactive map of Bouchfaa
- Country: Morocco
- Region: Taza-Al Hoceima-Taounate
- Province: Taza

Population (2004)
  - Total: 10,703
- Time zone: UTC+0 (GMT)

Bouchfaa is a commune in the Taza Province of the Taza-Al Hoceima-Taounate administrative region of Morocco. At the time of the 2004 census, the commune had a total population of 10703 people living in 1694 households.
