= Ghouazi =

Coordinates: 34°28′N 5°18′W

Ghouazi الغوازي
- Town
- Interactive map of Ghouazi
- Country: Morocco
- Region: Taza-Al Hoceima-Taounate
- Province: Taounate Province

Population (2004)
  - Total: 18,779
- Time zone: UTC+0 (GMT)

Ghouazi is a town in Taounate Province, Taza-Al Hoceima-Taounate, Morocco. According to the 2004 census it has a population of 18,779.
