= Outabouabane =

- commune
- Interactive map of Outabouabane
- Coordinates: 34°15′38″N 4°24′50″W
- Country: Morocco
- Region: Taza-Al Hoceima-Taounate
- Province: Taounate

Population (2004)
  - Total: 10,545
- Time zone: UTC+0 (GMT)

Outabouabane (Tarifit: Uṭṭa Bu Ɛban, (Intoxication of Rif snake tissue); Arabic: اوطا بوعبان) is a commune in the Taounate Province of the Taza-Al Hoceima-Taounate administrative region of Morocco. At the time of the 2004 census, the commune had a total population of 10,545 people living in 1490 households.
