= Bouhouda =

Bouhouda بوهودة
- Town
- Interactive map of Bouhouda
- Country: Morocco
- Region: Taza-Al Hoceima-Taounate
- Province: Taounate Province

Population (2004)
  - Total: 26,124
- Time zone: UTC+0 (GMT)

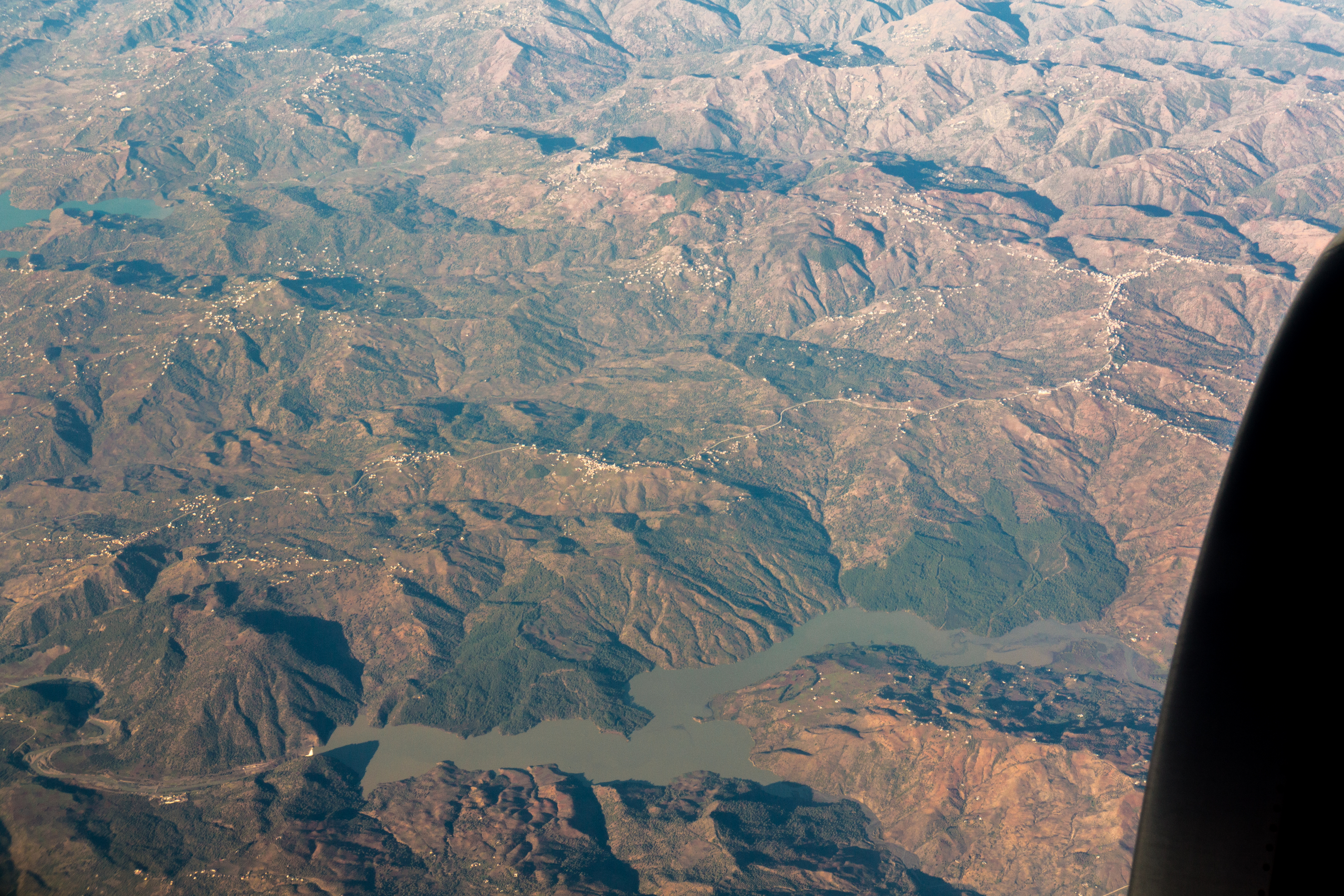
Barrage Bouhouda - Marokko - Air Photo (2014) - Lake near Bouhouda

Bouhouda is a town in Taounate Province, Taza-Al Hoceima-Taounate, Morocco. According to the 2004 census it has a population of 26,124.
