= Sidi Mokhfi =

Sidi Mokhfi سيدي المخفي
- commune
- Interactive map of Sidi Mokhfi
- Country: Morocco
- Region: Taza-Al Hoceima-Taounate
- Province: Taounate

Population (2004)
  - Total: 8,297
- Time zone: UTC+0 (GMT)

Sidi Mokhfi is a commune in the Taounate Province of the Taza-Al Hoceima-Taounate administrative region of Morocco. At the time of the 2004 census, the commune had a total population of 8297 people living in 1522 households.
