= Khlalfa =

Khlalfa الخلالفة
- commune
- Interactive map of Khlalfa
- Country: Morocco
- Region: Taza-Al Hoceima-Taounate
- Province: Taounate

Population (2004)
  - Total: 12,939
- Time zone: UTC+0 (GMT)

Khlalfa is a commune in the Taounate Province of the Taza-Al Hoceima-Taounate administrative region of Morocco. At the time of the 2004 census, the commune had a total population of 12939 people living in 2288 households.
