= Kissane =

Coordinates: 34°36′N 5°05′W

Kissane كيسان
- commune
- Interactive map of Kissane
- Country: Morocco
- Region: Taza-Al Hoceima-Taounate
- Province: Taounate

Population (2004)
  - Total: 13,712
- Time zone: UTC+0 (GMT)

Kissane is a commune in the Taounate Province of the Taza-Al Hoceima-Taounate administrative region of Morocco. At the time of the 2004 census, the commune had a total population of 13712 people living in 2620 households.
