= Ait Saghrouchen =

Ait Saghrouchen Ayt Seɣruccen
- commune
- Location within Morocco
- Coordinates: 34°00′44″N 4°33′13″W
- Country: Morocco
- Region: Taza-Al Hoceima-Taounate
- Province: Taza

Population (2004)
  - Total: 16,362
- Time zone: UTC+0 (GMT)

Ait Saghrouchen (Berber: Ayt Seɣruccen) is a commune in the Taza Province of the Taza-Al Hoceima-Taounate administrative region of Morocco.

At the time of the 2004 census, the commune had a total population of 16362 people living in 2888 households.
