= Galdamane =

- commune
- Interactive map of Galdamane
- Country: Morocco
- Region: Fès-Meknès
- Province: Taza

Population (2004)
  - Total: 21,111
- Time zone: UTC+0 (GMT)

Galdamane is a commune in the Taza Province of the Taza-Al Hoceima-Taounate administrative region of Morocco. At the time of the 2004 census, the commune had a total population of 21111 people living in 3372 households.
