= Bni Oulid =

Bni Oulid بني وليد
- commune
- A market with useful plants. Bundles of plants with pink flowers, May 1997
- Interactive map of Bni Oulid
- Coordinates: 34°35′18″N 4°26′50″W
- Country: Morocco
- Region: Taza-Al Hoceima-Taounate
- Province: Taounate

Population (2004)
  - Total: 11,775
- Time zone: UTC+0 (GMT)

Bni Oulid is a commune in the Taounate Province of the Taza-Al Hoceima-Taounate administrative region of Morocco. At the time of the 2004 census, the commune had a total population of 11775 people living in 2089 households.

== Tleta Beni Oulid ==
Suq Tleta Bni Oulid. A female potter with her pottery. Churn pots, 1997

A market with churn pots of a typical form, Tleta Beni Oulid, 1997

A market with useful plants. Tents. Bundles of plants with pink flowers, Tleta Beni Oulid, 1997

A market. A female potter and vendors of churn pots. Tomatoes, Tleta Beni Oulid, 1997
