= Zrizer =

- commune
- Location within Morocco
- Coordinates: 34°35′16″N 4°37′12″W
- Country: Morocco
- Region: Taza-Al Hoceima-Taounate
- Province: Taounate

Population (2004)
  - Total: 7,934
- Time zone: UTC+0 (GMT)

Zrizer is a commune in the Taounate Province of the Taza-Al Hoceima-Taounate administrative region of Morocco. At the time of the 2004 census, the commune had a total population of 7,934 people living in 1,500 households.
