= Maghraoua =

Maghraoua may refer to:

- Maghrawa, a Berber tribe
- Maghraoua, Morocco a commune in Taza Province
