= Oulad Daoud =

Oulad Daoud أولاد داود
- commune
- Interactive map of Oulad Daoud
- Country: Morocco
- Region: Taza-Al Hoceima-Taounate
- Province: Taounate

Population (2004)
  - Total: 12,271
- Time zone: UTC+0 (GMT)

Oulad Daoud is a commune in the Taounate Province of the Taza-Al Hoceima-Taounate administrative region of Morocco. At the time of the 2004 census, the commune had a total population of 12271 people living in 1970 households.
