= Messassa =

Messassa مساسة
- commune
- Interactive map of Messassa
- Country: Morocco
- Region: Taza-Al Hoceima-Taounate
- Province: Taounate

Population (2004)
  - Total: 9,497
- Time zone: UTC+0 (GMT)

Messassa is a commune in the Taounate Province of the Taza-Al Hoceima-Taounate administrative region of Morocco. At the time of the 2004 census, the commune had a total population of 9497 people living in 1476 households.
