= Michael Joseph Fitzgerald =

American prelate of the Catholic Church (born 1948)

His Excellency, The Most Reverend Michael Joseph Fitzgerald
- Auxiliary Bishop emeritus of Philadelphia; Titular Bishop of Tamallula
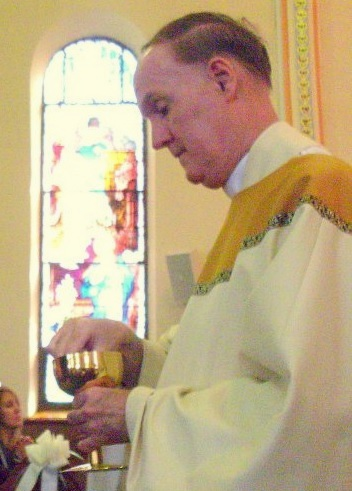
- Archdiocese: Philadelphia
- Appointed: June 22, 2010
- Installed: August 6, 2010
- Retired: May 24, 2023
- Other post: Titular Bishop of Tamallula

Orders
- Ordination: May 17, 1980 by John Krol
- Consecration: August 6, 2010 by Justin Francis Rigali, John Patrick Foley, and Joseph Robert Cistone

Personal details
- Born: May 23, 1948 (age 78) Montclair, New Jersey, US
- Motto: Per crucem ad lucem (Through the cross to the light)

Styles of Michael Joseph Fitzgerald
- Reference style: His Excellency; The Most Reverend
- Spoken style: Your Excellency
- Religious style: Bishop

Michael Joseph Fitzgerald (born May 23, 1948) is an American prelate of the Catholic Church, having served as an auxiliary bishop of the Archdiocese of Philadelphia in Philadelphia from 2010 until his retirement in 2023.

== Biography ==
=== Early life and education ===
Michael Fitzgerald was born on May 23, 1948, in Montclair, New Jersey, the second of nine children of Edwin and Dorothy (née Bogart) Fitzgerald. He and his family moved when he was a young boy to Southwest Philadelphia and then to King of Prussia, Pennsylvania. Fitzgerald attended St. Clement Parish school in Philadelphia and St. Augustine Parish school in Bridgeport, Pennsylvania. He entered Bishop Kenrick High School in Norristown, Pennsylvania in 1962, graduating in 1966.

Fitzgerald graduated from Temple University in Philadelphia with a Bachelor of English degree in 1970, and earned a Juris Doctor from Villanova University School of Law in Villanova, Pennsylvania, in 1973. He served as a judicial clerk in the Court of Common Pleas in Montgomery County, Pennsylvania, from 1973 to 1975, and then worked in private practice.

After feeling called to the priesthood, Fitzgerald consulted his pastor and then entered St. Charles Borromeo Seminary in Philadelphia in 1975. He earned a Master of Divinity degree from St. Charles in 1980.

=== Ordination and ministry ===
On May 17, 1980, Fitzgerald was ordained a priest for the Archdiocese of Philadelphia by Cardinal John Krol. After his ordination, Fitzgerald's first assignment was as a parochial vicar at Immaculate Heart of Mary Parish in the Roxborough section of Philadelphia, remaining there for one year. He then served at St. Callistus Parish in Philadelphia from 1981 to 1982. In 1982, Fitzgerald was appointed the defender of the bond, then in 1983 a judge on the metropolitan tribunal. During his four-year tenure on the tribunal, he lived at Immaculate Conception Parish in the Northern Liberties section of Philadelphia.

Fitzgerald furthered his studies at the Catholic University of America in Washington, D.C., where he earned a Licentiate of Canon Law in 1989. In 1991, he received a Doctor of Canon Law degree from the Pontifical Gregorian University in Rome. Following his return to Philadelphia, Fitzgerald served as the first director of the archdiocesan Office for Legal Services from 1991 to 2004. During his tenure as director, he lived at St. Thomas Aquinas Parish and afterwards at Annunciation B.V.M. Parish, both in South Philadelphia. He was named by the Vatican a chaplain of his holiness on March 24, 2003.

From 2004 to 2007, Fitzgerald was vice-rector of St. Charles Borromeo Seminary. As vice-rector, he also served as chairman of the Admissions Committee. He became judicial vicar of the archdiocese in 2007, holding that office until 2010. During his three-year tenure, he lived at St. Patrick's Parish in Philadelphia. He also served as a member of the college of consultors, the priests personnel board, and the priests' counsel. He was also a chaplain to the Serra Club of Philadelphia and to the Holy Spirit Adoration Sisters community in the archdiocese.

=== Auxiliary Bishop of Philadelphia ===
On June 22, 2010, Fitzgerald was appointed auxiliary bishop of Philadelphia and titular bishop of Tamallula by Pope Benedict XVI. He received his episcopal consecration on August 6, 2010, from Cardinal Justin Rigali at the Cathedral Basilica of SS. Peter and Paul in Philadelphia.

On May 24, 2023, Pope Francis accepted Fitzgerald's resignation as auxiliary bishop of Philadelphia, his having reached the mandatory retirement age of 75.

Catholic Church titles
Preceded by –	Auxiliary Bishop of Philadelphia; 2010–2023	Incumbent
