= Sidi M'Hamed Ben Lahcen =

Sidi M'Hamed Ben Lahcen سيدي محمد بن الحسن
- Town
- Interactive map of Sidi M'Hamed Ben Lahcen
- Country: Morocco
- Region: Taza-Al Hoceima-Taounate
- Province: Taounate Province

Population (2004)
  - Total: 18,990
- Time zone: UTC+0 (GMT)

Sidi M'Hamed Ben Lahcen is a town in Taounate Province, Taza-Al Hoceima-Taounate, Morocco. According to the 2004 census it has a population of 18,990.
