= Borj Belkari =

Coordinates: 33°53′15.2″N 5°34′3.4″W

- برج بالقاري
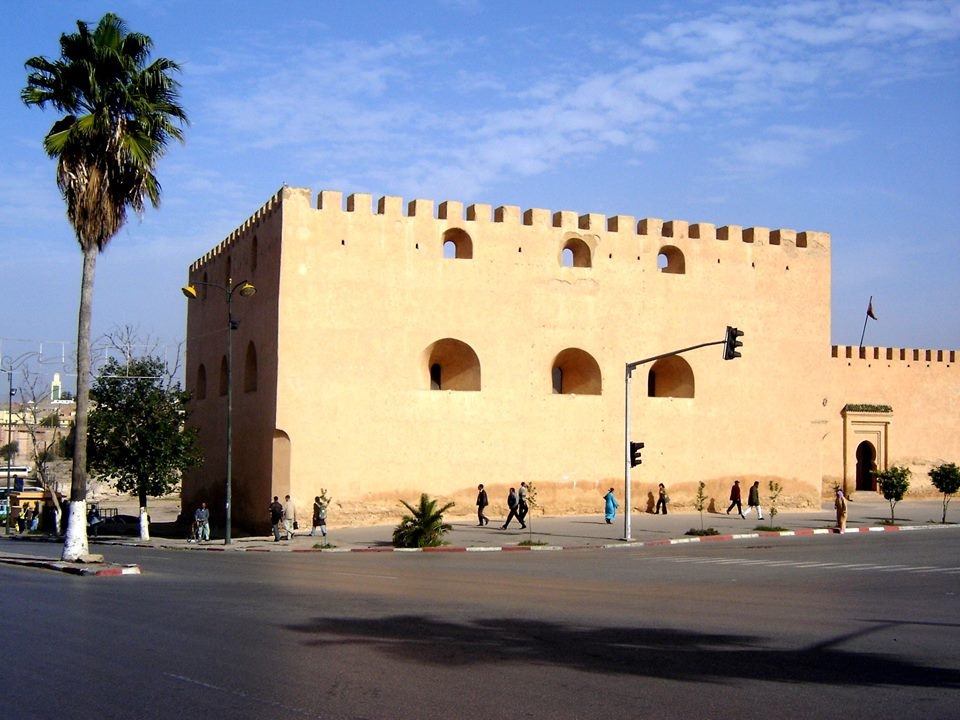
- Borj Belkari tower. Built in the 17th century.
- Interactive map of the Borj Belkari area

General information
- Type: bastion
- Architectural style: Moroccan
- Location: Meknes, Morocco
- Completed: 17th century

Borj Belkari (Arabic: برج بالقاري, romanized: Burj bel-kari) is a bastion tower built in the 17th century as a part of the defensive walls of the Kasbah of Sultan Moulay Ismail in Meknes, Morocco. Since 2003 this tower holds the museum of pottery.

== Museum collection ==
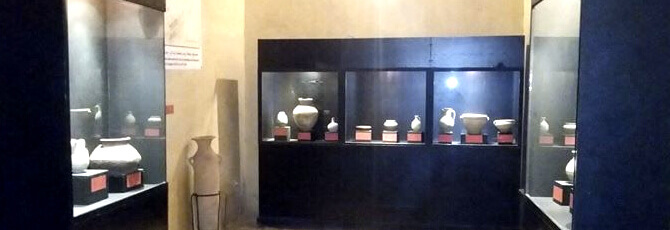
Inside the museum of pottery in Borj Belkari tower, Meknes.

The Museum houses pottery collections of the Rif and the anterior Rif regions arranged in both chronological and thematic groupings and the fabrication procedures of Rif pottery from the prehistoric period to the present. The visit starts on the right of the entrance with archaeological ceramic finds in order to better appreciate the current pottery in the museum. It finishes with a reconstruction of a pottery workshop. The permanent collection is composed of prehistoric, vintage and Islamic pottery, and of pottery from different geographical zones of Morocco. The first section presents the history of the ceramics of the Rif and the pre-Rif periods distributed in three halls. The visitor has the opportunity to familiarize themselves with the characteristics of prehistoric ceramics, through the observation of several shapes, modeled or crafted and enriched with decoration. A second hall displays the pottery of ceramics that date back to the pre-Islamic period, and a third hall houses Islamic ceramics, especially green ceramics. As for the second section, it is entirely devoted to the current and old workshops of pottery.the pottery and ceramic pottery comes from five regions (Zerhoun and Meknes, Oued Laou, Ouazzane and Sless, Kariat Ba Mohamed and Tsoul), are displayed.
