= Tafrant =

- commune
- Location within Morocco
- Coordinates: 34.625°N 5.124167°W
- Country: Morocco
- Region: Taza-Al Hoceima-Taounate
- Province: Taounate

Population (2004)
  - Total: 13,622
- Time zone: UTC+0 (GMT)

Tafrant is a commune in the Taounate Province of the Taza-Al Hoceima-Taounate administrative region of Morocco. At the time of the 2004 census, the commune had a total population of 13,622 people living in 2,494 households.
