= Tabouda =

Coordinates: 34°43′N 5°08′W

Tabouda تابودة
- commune
- Interactive map of Tabouda
- Country: Morocco
- Region: Taza-Al Hoceima-Taounate
- Province: Taounate

Population (2004)
  - Total: 15,644
- Time zone: UTC+0 (GMT)

Tabouda is a commune in the Taounate Province of the Taza-Al Hoceima-Taounate administrative region of Morocco. At the time of the 2004 census, the commune had a total population of 15644 people living in 2747 households.
