= Meknassa Acharqia =

Meknassa Acharqia مكناسة الشرقية
- commune
- Interactive map of Meknassa Acharqia
- Coordinates: 34°18′35″N 3°57′48″W
- Country: Morocco
- Region: Taza-Al Hoceima-Taounate
- Province: Taza

Population (2004)
  - Total: 7,532
- Time zone: UTC+0 (GMT)

Meknassa Acharqia is a commune in the Taza Province of the Taza-Al Hoceima-Taounate administrative region of Morocco. At the time of the 2004 census, the commune had a total population of 7,532 people living in 1,266 households.
