= Bouarouss =

Coordinates: 34°22′N 4°49′W

Bouarouss بوعروس
- Town
- Interactive map of Bouarouss
- Country: Morocco
- Region: Taza-Al Hoceima-Taounate
- Province: Taounate Province

Population (2004)
  - Total: 18,495
- Time zone: UTC+0 (GMT)

Bouarouss is a town in Taounate Province, Taza-Al Hoceima-Taounate, Morocco. According to the 2004 census it has a population of 18,495.
