= Bouhlou =

Bouhlou may refer to:

- Bouhlou, Algeria
- Bouhlou, Morocco
