= Bouyablane =

Bouyablane بويبلان
- commune
- Location within Morocco
- Country: Morocco
- Region: Taza-Al Hoceima-Taounate
- Province: Taza

Population (2004)
  - Total: 3,534
- Time zone: UTC+0 (GMT)

Bouyablane is a commune in the Taza Province of the Taza-Al Hoceima-Taounate administrative region of Morocco. At the time of the 2004 census, the commune had a total population of 3534 people living in 468 households.
