= Gzenaya Al Janoubia =

Gzenaya Al Janoubia اڭزناية الجنوبية
- commune
- Location within Morocco
- Coordinates: 34.6236°N 3.8639°W
- Country: Morocco
- Region: Taza-Al Hoceima-Taounate
- Province: Taza

Population (2024)
  - Total: 8,125
- Time zone: UTC+0 (GMT)

Gzenaya Al Janoubia is a commune in the Taza Province of the Taza-Al Hoceima-Taounate administrative region of Morocco. At the time of the 2024 census, the commune had a total population of 8,125 people.
