= Bni Frassen =

Coordinates: 34°23′N 4°23′W

Bni Frassen بني فراسن
- commune
- Interactive map of Bni Frassen
- Country: Morocco
- Region: Taza-Al Hoceima-Taounate
- Province: Taza

Population (2004)
  - Total: 28,014
- Time zone: UTC+0 (GMT)

Bni Frassen is a commune in the Taza Province of the Taza-Al Hoceima-Taounate administrative region of Morocco. At the time of the 2004 census, the commune had a total population of 28014 people living in 4386 households.
