= Oued Jemaa =

Oued Jemaa واد الجمعة
- commune
- Location within Morocco
- Coordinates: 34°13′51″N 4°47′02″W
- Country: Morocco
- Region: Taza-Al Hoceima-Taounate
- Province: Taounate

Population (2004)
  - Total: 9,983
- Time zone: UTC+0 (GMT)

Oued Jemaa is a commune in the Taounate Province of the Taza-Al Hoceima-Taounate administrative region of Morocco. At the time of the 2004 census, the commune had a total population of 9,983 people living in 1,534 households.
