= Jbabra =

- Town
- Interactive map of Jbabra
- Coordinates: 34°25′50″N 4°57′52″W
- Country: Morocco
- Region: Taza-Al Hoceima-Taounate
- Province: Taounate Province

Population (2004)
  - Total: 19,076
- Time zone: UTC+0 (GMT)

Jbabra is a town in Taounate Province, Taza-Al Hoceima-Taounate, Morocco. According to the 2004 census it has a population of 19,076.
