= Bni Lent =

Bni Lent بني لنت
- commune
- Interactive map of Bni Lent
- Country: Morocco
- Region: Taza-Al Hoceima-Taounate
- Province: Taza

Population (2004)
  - Total: 13,678
- Time zone: UTC+0 (GMT)

Bni Lent is a commune in the Taza Province of the Taza-Al Hoceima-Taounate administrative region of Morocco. At the time of the 2004 census, the commune had a total population of 13,678 people living in 2,188 households.
