= Tamedit =

Tamedit تمضيت ⵜⴰⵎⴹⵉⵜ
- Town
- Interactive map of Tamedit
- Coordinates: 34°40′59″N 4°11′48″W
- Country: Morocco
- Region: Taza-Al Hoceima-Taounate
- Province: Taounate Province

Population (2004)
  - Total: 21,453
- Time zone: UTC+0 (GMT)

Tamedit is a town and rural commune in Taounate Province, Taza-Al Hoceima-Taounate, Morocco. According to the 2004 census it has a population of 21,453.
