= Ghiata Al Gharbia =

Ghiata Al Gharbia غياثة الغربية
- commune
- Interactive map of Ghiata Al Gharbia
- Country: Morocco
- Region: Taza-Al Hoceima-Taounate
- Province: Taza

Population (2004)
  - Total: 23,447
- Time zone: UTC+0 (GMT)

Ghiata Al Gharbia is a commune in the Taza Province of the Taza-Al Hoceima-Taounate administrative region of Morocco. At the time of the 2004 census, the commune had a total population of 23447 people living in 3401 households.
