= Sidi Yahya Bni Zeroual =

Sidi Yahya Bni Zeroual سيدي يحيى بني زروال
- commune
- Interactive map of Sidi Yahya Bni Zeroual
- Country: Morocco
- Region: Taza-Al Hoceima-Taounate
- Province: Taounate

Population (2004)
  - Total: 14,930
- Time zone: UTC+0 (GMT)

Sidi Yahya Bni Zeroual is a commune in the Taounate Province of the Taza-Al Hoceima-Taounate administrative region of Morocco. At the time of the 2004 census, the commune had a total population of 14930 people living in 2616 households.
