= Oudka =

- commune
- Interactive map of Oudka
- Country: Morocco
- Region: Taza-Al Hoceima-Taounate
- Province: Taounate

Population (2004)
  - Total: 8,392
- Time zone: UTC+0 (GMT)

Oudka is a commune in the Taounate Province of the Taza-Al Hoceima-Taounate administrative region of Morocco. At the time of the 2004 census, the commune had a population of 8392 people living in 1601 households.
