= Galaz =

Coordinates: 34°33′N 4°48′W

Galaz كلاز
- commune
- Interactive map of Galaz
- Country: Morocco
- Region: Taza-Al Hoceima-Taounate
- Province: Taounate

Population (2004)
  - Total: 18,471
- Time zone: UTC+0 (GMT)

Galaz is a commune in the Taounate Province of the Taza-Al Hoceima-Taounate administrative region of Morocco. At the time of the 2004 census, the commune had a total population of 18471 people living in 3636 households.
