= El Bibane =

El Bibane البيبان
- commune
- Location within Morocco
- Coordinates: 34°36′N 4°24′W
- Country: Morocco
- Region: Taza-Al Hoceima-Taounate
- Province: Taounate

Population (2004)
  - Total: 6,593
- Time zone: UTC+0 (GMT)

El Bibane is a commune in the Taounate Province of the Taza-Al Hoceima-Taounate administrative region of Morocco. At the time of the 2004 census, the commune had a total population of 6593 people living in 1377 households.
