= Yasmine Lafitte =

French pornographic actress

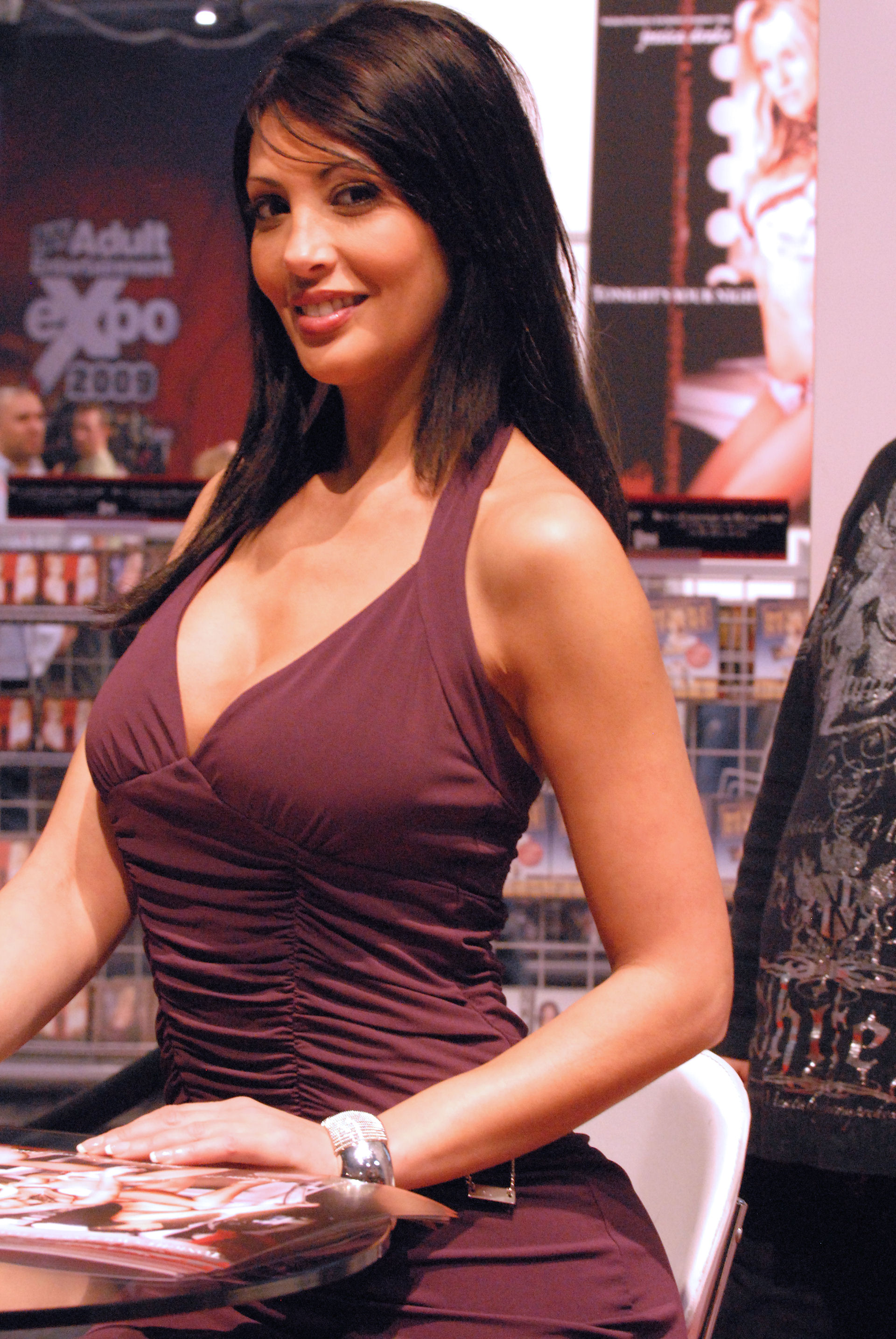
- Lafitte at 2009 AVN Adult Entertainment Expo
- Born: Tahar Souk, Morocco
- Occupation: actress
- Height: Moroccan
- Awards: 2007 Venus Award winner - Best European Actress
- Website: www.clubyasmine.com

Yasmine Lafitte (Arabic: ياسمين لافيت) is a French-Moroccan former pornographic actress who performed under the mononym Yasmine.

== Life and career ==
Born in an observant Muslim family in Thar Es-Souk, a small village of Morocco, Lafitte moved to France with her family when she was just five months old, and she grew up in a suburb of Lyon. At 18 years old, after graduating from high school, she left her family; during this period, she trained to become a nurse and worked as a waitress to pay for her studies.

In 2004, she entered the adult industry together with her boyfriend at the time, after having replied to a magazine ad of a small production company which was looking for amateur couples. In 2006, she was featured in an episode of the TF1 talk show La Méthode Cauet, then she was requested in newspaper interviews, magazine covers and jet-set events, and she became a spokesmodel for the magazine FHM. In 2007, she signed an exclusive contract with the producer Marc Dorcel. That same year, she had a significant role in Danielle Arbid's film drama A Lost Man, which premiered at the 60th Cannes Film Festival. In 2008, she had a supporting role in Olivier Marchal's crime drama MR 73. After having worked in several international productions, she retired from adult performing in February 2009 to focus her career on traditional films and in production.

In 2005, she started, along with Olivier Lafitte, her own production company under the name "Alko Productions".

== Awards and nominations ==
- 2007 Venus Award winner - Best European Actress
- 2007 X Awards - Best Actress
- 2008 X Awards - Best Actress
- 2008 Eroticline Award - Best European Actress
