= Ain Legdah =

Coordinates: 34°10′N 4°30′W

Ain Legdah عين لكداح
- commune
- Interactive map of Ain Legdah
- Country: Morocco
- Region: Taza-Al Hoceima-Taounate
- Province: Taounate

Population (2004)
  - Total: 12,196
- Time zone: UTC+0 (GMT)

Ain Legdah is a commune in the Taounate Province of the Taza-Al Hoceima-Taounate administrative region of Morocco. At the time of the 2004 census, the commune had a total population of 12196 people living in 1907 households.
