= Timezgana =

Coordinates: 34°35′N 4°44′W

- commune
- Interactive map of Timezgana
- Country: Morocco
- Region: Taza-Al Hoceima-Taounate
- Province: Taounate

Population (2004)
  - Total: 15,085
- Time zone: UTC+0 (GMT)

Timezgana is a commune in the Taounate Province of the Taza-Al Hoceima-Taounate administrative region of Morocco. At the time of the 2004 census, the commune had a total population of 15085 people living in 2677 households.
