= Achraf Bencharki =

Moroccan footballer (born 1994)

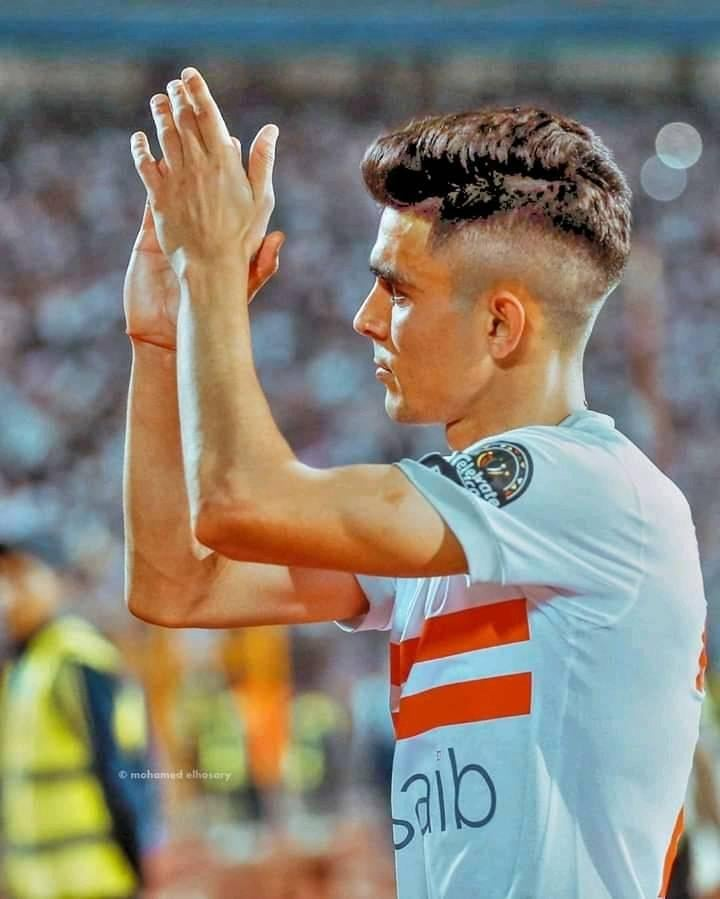
- Bencharki with Zamalek at CAF Champions League in 2020

Personal information
- Full name: Achraf Bencharki
- Date of birth: 24 September 1994 (age 32)
- Place of birth: Oulad Zbair, Morocco
- Height: 1.82 m (6 ft 0 in)
- Positions: Left winger; forward

Team information
- Current team: Al Ahly
- Number: 34

Senior career*
Years	Team	Apps	(Gls)
2014–2016	Maghreb de Fès	48	(13)
2016–2017	Wydad Casablanca	30	(4)
2018–2019	Al-Hilal	7	(3)
2018–2019	→ Lens (loan)	23	(3)
2019–2022	Zamalek	73	(26)
2022–2023	Al Jazira	24	(5)
2023–2025	Al-Rayyan	27	(13)
2025–	Al Ahly	10	(3)

International career^{‡}
2015	Morocco U23	4	(4)
2018–2021	Morocco A	9	(1)
2018–	Morocco	10	(0)
Medal record
Men's football
Representing Morocco
African Nations Championship
Winner	2018 Morocco
- * Club domestic league appearances and goals as of 10:17, 29 December 2024 (UTC) ‡ National team caps and goals as of 12 December 2021

Achraf Bencharki (Arabic: أَشْرَف بْن شَرْقِيّ; born 24 September 1994) is a Moroccan professional footballer who is currently playing for Egyptian Premier League club Al Ahly and the Morocco national team. He can be deployed as a left winger or as a forward.

== Club career ==
Born in Oulad Zbair, Morocco, Bencharki began his career at Maghreb de Fès where he joined the first team for the 2014–15 season. In the 2015–16 season, he scored 9 goals in 27 matches.

In 2016, he moved to Wydad Casablanca for a reported transfer fee of 300 million Moroccan dirham. He helped the club win the 2017 CAF Champions League and qualify for the FIFA Club World Cup. He was praised for his performances in the CAF Champions League and was widely considered the best player of the competitions's final.

In January 2018, Bencharki joined Saudi Professional League club Al-Hilal for a $9 million transfer fee. He won the Saudi Pro League: 2017–18 and the Saudi Super Cup: 2018.

In August 2018, he joined Ligue 2 club RC Lens on loan for the 2018–19 season.

In July 2019, Bencharki joined Egyptian Premier League side Zamalek SC on a three-year contract. On 18 October 2020, he scored the only goal in 1–0 away win for Zamalek SC over Raja Casablanca in the 2019–20 CAF Champions League semi-finals.

With Zamalek, he won two Egyptian Premier League titles (2021, 2022), two Egypt Cups (2019, 2021), the Egyptian Super Cup (2020), and the CAF Super Cup (2020). He also played a pivotal role in leading Zamalek to the 2020 CAF Champions League final against Al Ahly.

Bencharki signed with Qatari side Al-Rayyan in 2023, before returning to Egypt to join Al-Ahly in January 2025.

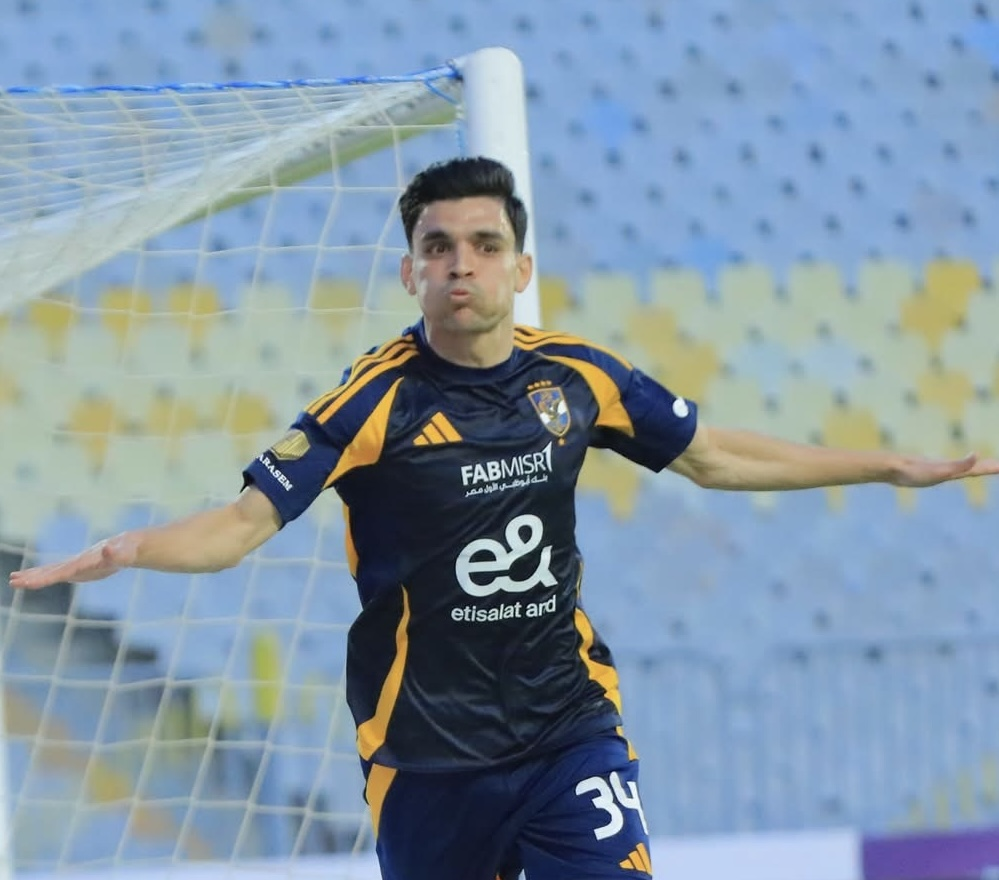
Ben Charki celebrated a goal with Al Ahly in 2025

Achraf Bencharki made a dream debut for his Ahly journey after scoring a precious goal against old team Zamalek but the Cairo derby ended in a 1–1 draw on Saturday.

Al Ahly played vs Haras El-Hedood, The introduction of Achraf Bencharki in the 45th minute, replacing Egyptian player Hussein El Shahat, marked a turning point for the offensive dynamics of the Cairo club. Achraf Bencharki secured a valuable victory for Al Ahly (0–1) away from home, allowing his team to temporarily reclaim the top spot in the standings.

Bencharki won the league and the Egyptian super cup with Al Ahly in 2025.

== International career ==
Bencharki played for the Morocco national under-23 team and under 21 team having previously played for their under-20 team.

Bencharki represented Morocco in the 2018 African Nations Championship. He scored his first goal for Morocco against Mauritania in a 4–0 victory.

Bencharki won the 2018 African Nations Championship final with Morocco with a 4–0 win vs Nigeria.

== Career statistics ==
As of match played 11 January 2025

Appearances and goals by club, season and competition
Club	Season	League			National cup (Note: Includes Moroccan Throne Cup, Coupe de France, Egypt Cup, UAE President's Cup, Emir of Qatar Cup)		League cup (Note: Includes UAE League Cup)		Continental		Other		Total	
Club	Season	Division	Apps	Goals	Apps	Goals	Apps	Goals	Apps	Goals	Apps	Goals	Apps	Goals
Maghreb de Fès	2014–15	Botola	25	4	0	0	–		–		–		25	4
Maghreb de Fès	2015–16	Botola	27	9	1	1	–		–		–		28	10
Maghreb de Fès	Total		52	13	1	1	–		–		–		53	14
Wydad	2016–17	Botola	25	4	0	0	–		7 (Note: Appearances in CAF Champions League)	2	–		32	9
Wydad	2017–18	Botola	5	0	2	1	–		5	3	1 (Note: Appearance in FIFA Club World Cup)	0	13	4
Wydad	Total		30	4	2	1	–		12	5	1	0	45	13
Al Hilal	2017–18	Saudi Pro League	7	3	0	0	0	0	6 (Note: Appearances in AFC Champions League)	0	–		13	3
Lens (loan)	2018–19	Ligue 2	23	3	3	1	0	0	–		–		26	4
Zamalek	2019–20	Egyptian Premier League	22	3	4	4	–		11	6	3 (Note: Two appearances in Egyptian Super Cup, one appearance and two goals in CAF Super Cup)	2	40	15
Zamalek	2020–21	Egyptian Premier League	30	15	4	1	–		7	0	–		41	16
Zamalek	2021–22	Egyptian Premier League	21	8	1	1	–		8	2	–		30	11
Zamalek	Total		73	26	9	6	–		26	8	3	2	111	42
Al Jazira	2022–23	UAE Pro League	24	5	3	2	6	2	0	0	–		33	9
Al-Rayyan	2023–24	Qatar Stars League	19	10	2	2	5	2	–		2	0	28	14
Al-Rayyan	2024–25	Qatar Stars League	8	3	0	0	2	0	6 (Note: Appearances in AFC Champions League Elite)	1	0	0	16	4
Al-Rayyan	Total		27	13	2	2	7	2	6	1	2	0	44	18
Al-Ahly	2024–25	Egyptian Premier League	10	3	0	0	–		4	0	2 (Note: Two appearances in Club World Cup)	0	16	3
Al-Ahly	Total		10	3	0	0	0	0	4	0	2	0	16	3
Career Total			246	70	23	14	13	4	54	14	8	2	341	106

== Honours ==
Wydad Casablanca

- Botola Pro: 2016–17
- CAF Champions League: 2017

Al Hilal

- Saudi Pro League: 2017–18
- Saudi Super Cup: 2018

Zamalek

- Egyptian Premier League: 2020–21, 2021–22
- Egypt Cup: 2018–19, 2020–21
- Egyptian Super Cup: 2019
- CAF Super Cup: 2020
- CAF Champions League runner-up: 2020

Al Ahly

- Egyptian Premier League: 2024–25
- Egyptian Super Cup: 2025

Morocco A

- African Nations Championship: 2018

Individual

- Toulon Tournament Golden Boot: 2015
- CAF Team of the Year: 2017
- Zamalek Player of the Year: 2020
