= Bouadel =

Bouadel بوعادل
- commune
- Interactive map of Bouadel
- Country: Morocco
- Region: Taza-Al Hoceima-Taounate
- Province: Taounate

Population (2004)
  - Total: 13,691
- Time zone: UTC+0 (GMT)

Bouadel is a commune in the Taounate Province of the Taza-Al Hoceima-Taounate administrative region of Morocco. At the time of the 2004 census, the commune had a total population of 13691 people living in 2377 households.
