= Abd Al Salam Al Masawi =

Moroccan poet

Abd Al Salam Al Masawi (Arabic: عبد السلام المساوي), also known as Abdel Salam El Massaoui, is a Moroccan poet and writer. He was born in Morocco in 1958. He is currently the head of the Regional Center for Documentation, Revitalization and Production at the Fez Academy. He has won multiple awards, including the Baland Al-Haidari Award (Asilah Forum) for his book "The Ceilings of Al-Majaz" in 2000.

== Biography ==
Abdel Salam El Massaoui was born in 1958 in Bayla, Zaher Souk (Taounate Province), Morocco. He has won multiple awards, including the Baland Al-Haidari Prize (Asilah Forum) for his book "The Ceilings of Al-Majaz" in 2000. He holds a state doctorate in contemporary Arabic literature and previously held the position of head of the Regional Center for Documentation, Revitalization, and Production at the Academy of Fez. He continued his postgraduate studies at the Faculty of Letters and Human Sciences in Fez.

He obtained a BA in Arabic literature in 1982, a certificate of in-depth studies in 1985, and a postgraduate diploma in 1992. He works as a professor of higher education at the Teacher Training Center in Fez. His publications began in 1983 with the appearance of his poem "No Love on Borders" in the Socialist Union newspaper. He joined the Union of Moroccan Writers on June 13, 1991.

His production ranges between poetic writing, narrative, and literary criticism. He published his works in a number of newspapers and magazines, including Al-Alam, Cultural Anwal, Anwal, Socialist Union, Literary Week (Syria), Damascene Culture (Syria), Afaq, Raseef, The Seventh Day, Witness (Cyprus), Knowledge (Syria), and Al-Fursan (Paris). Among his publications are "The Snatcher Birds" (poetry), "This is what Poetry Gave Me" (poetry), "The Significant Structures in Amal Dunqul's Poetry," and "Colored Rhythms – Readings in Contemporary Moroccan Poetry."

== Works ==
- "A letter to my village": poetry. Casablanca, Nashra Foundation for Printing and Publishing, 1986. p. 72
- "The Significant Structures in the Poetry of Amal Dunqul". Publications of the Arab Writers Union, Damascus, 1994.
- "The ceilings of metaphor". Moroccan publishing house, Casablanca, 1999.
- "Spiders from the Blood of Place". Postmodern House 2003
- "Sniffer birds". With the support of the Ministry of Culture, 2006
- "The Aesthetics of Death in Mahmoud Darwish's Poetry". Dar Al-Saqi 2008
- "This is what poetry gave me". Infoprint House 2008
- "Military melody for a sentimental song". Dar Al-Nahda 2011
- "The imagined death in the poetry of Adonis". Dar Al-Naya 2013
- "Wide Interpretation". House of Poetry in Morocco 2015

== Prizes ==
- Baland Al-Haidari Award (Asilah Forum) for his book "The Ceilings of Al-Majaz" in 2000.
