= Moulay Bouchta =

Coordinates: 34°29′N 5°07′W

Moulay Bouchta مولاي بوشتى
- Town
- Interactive map of Moulay Bouchta
- Country: Morocco
- Region: Taza-Al Hoceima-Taounate
- Province: Taounate Province

Population (2004)
  - Total: 16,602
- Time zone: UTC+0 (GMT)

Moulay Bouchta is a town in Taounate Province, Taza-Al Hoceima-Taounate, Morocco. According to the 2004 census it has a population of 16,602.
