= Msila =

Msila may refer to:

- M'Sila, Algeria, the capital of M'Sila Province, Algeria
- M'Sila Province, Algeria
- Msila, Morocco, a municipality in Taza Province, Morocco
