= Smià =

Coordinates: 34°1′50″N 4°23′24″W

- commune
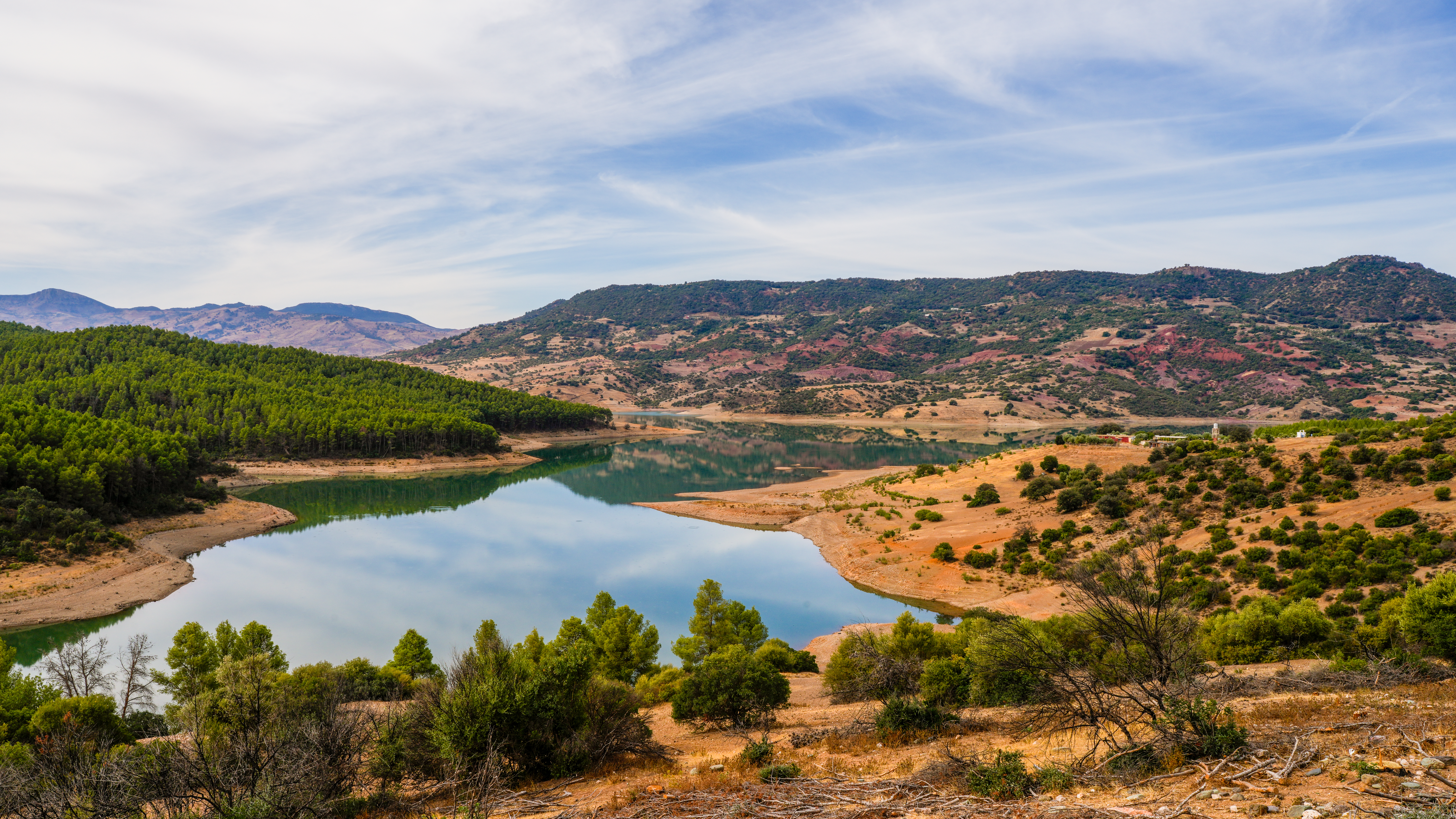
- Lake Bab Louta in Smia commune
- Interactive map of Smià
- Country: Morocco
- Region: Taza-Al Hoceima-Taounate
- Province: Taza

Population (2004)
  - Total: 8,099
- Time zone: UTC+0 (GMT)

Smià is a commune in the Taza Province of the Taza-Al Hoceima-Taounate administrative region of Morocco. At the time of the 2004 census, the commune had a total population of 8099 people living in 1333 households.
