= Bab Marzouka =

Bab Marzouka باب مرزوقة
- Commune
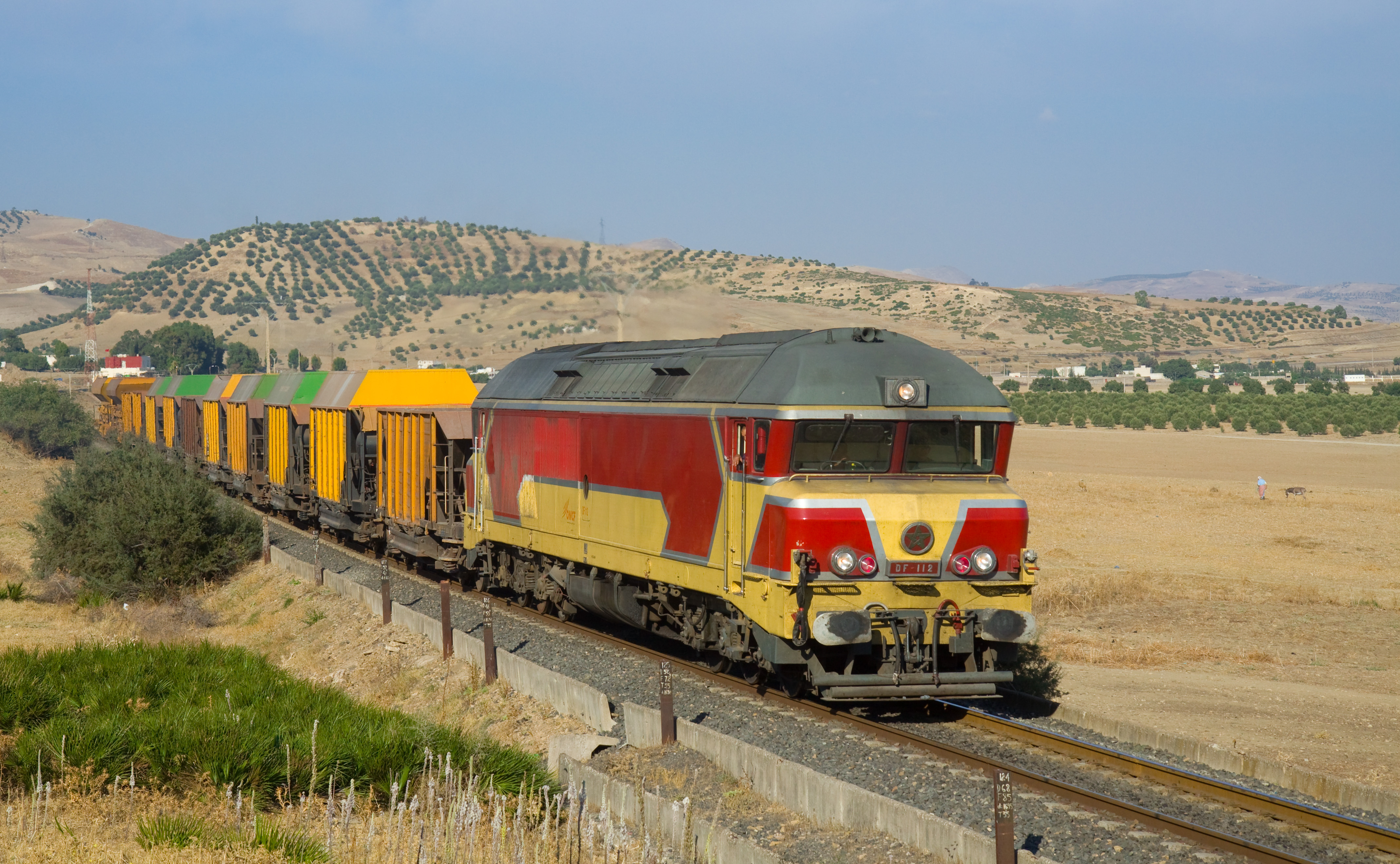

- Location within Morocco
- Coordinates: 34.2300°N 4.0750°W
- Country: Morocco
- Region: Taza-Al Hoceima-Taounate
- Province: Taza

Population (2004)
  - Total: 20,846
- Time zone: UTC+0 (GMT)

Bab Marzouka (Arabic: باب مرزوقة) is a commune in the Taza Province of the Taza-Al Hoceima-Taounate administrative region of Morocco. At the time of the 2004 census, the commune had a total population of 20846 people living in 3173 households.
