= Oulad Chrif =

Coordinates: 31°46′N 7°47′W

Oulad Chrif أولاد الشريف
- commune
- Interactive map of Oulad Chrif
- Country: Morocco
- Region: Taza-Al Hoceima-Taounate
- Province: Taza

Population (2004)
  - Total: 10,439
- Time zone: UTC+0 (GMT)

Oulad Chrif is a commune in the Taza Province of the Taza-Al Hoceima-Taounate administrative region of Morocco. At the time of the 2004 census, the commune had a total population of 10439 people living in 1403 households.
