= Mezraoua =

Mezraoua مزراوة
- commune
- Interactive map of Mezraoua
- Country: Morocco
- Region: Taza-Al Hoceima-Taounate
- Province: Taounate

Population (2004)
  - Total: 9,883
- Time zone: UTC+0 (GMT)

Mezraoua is a commune in the Taounate Province of the Taza-Al Hoceima-Taounate administrative region of Morocco. At the time of the 2004 census, the commune had a total population of 9883 people living in 1661 households.
