= Sidi Haj M'Hamed =

Sidi Haj M'Hamed سيدي الحاج امحمد
- commune
- Interactive map of Sidi Haj M'Hamed
- Country: Morocco
- Region: Taza-Al Hoceima-Taounate
- Province: Taounate

Population (2004)
  - Total: 8,649
- Time zone: UTC+0 (GMT)

Sidi Haj M'Hamed is a commune in the Taounate Province of the Taza-Al Hoceima-Taounate administrative region of Morocco. At the time of the 2004 census, the commune had a total population of 8649 people living in 1425 households.
