= Bouchabel =

Coordinates: 34°23′N 5°01′W

Bouchabel بوشابل
- Town
- Interactive map of Bouchabel
- Country: Morocco
- Region: Taza-Al Hoceima-Taounate
- Province: Taounate Province

Population (2004)
  - Total: 16,652
- Time zone: UTC+0 (GMT)

Bouchabel is a town in Taounate Province, Taza-Al Hoceima-Taounate, Morocco. According to the 2004 census it has a population of 16,652.
