= Bni Ounjel Tafraout =

Bni Ounjel Tafraout بني ونجل تافراوت
- commune
- Interactive map of Bni Ounjel Tafraout
- Country: Morocco
- Region: Taza-Al Hoceima-Taounate
- Province: Taounate

Population (2004)
  - Total: 8,421
- Time zone: UTC+0 (GMT)

Bni Ounjel Tafraout is a commune in the Taounate Province of the Taza-Al Hoceima-Taounate administrative region of Morocco. At the time of the 2004 census, the commune had a total population of 8,421 people living in 1,352 households.
