= Sidi Ali Bourakba =

Sidi Ali Bourakba سيدي علي بورقبة
- commune
- Interactive map of Sidi Ali Bourakba
- Country: Morocco
- Region: Taza-Al Hoceima-Taounate
- Province: Taza

Government

Population (2004)
  - Total: 1,856
- Time zone: UTC+0 (GMT)

Sidi Ali Bourakba is a commune in the Taza Province of the Taza-Al Hoceima-Taounate administrative region of Morocco. At the time of the 2004 census, the commune had a total population of 1856 people living in 10500 households.
