= Moulay Abdelkrim =

Moulay Abdelkrim مولاي عبد الكريم
- commune
- Location within Morocco
- Country: Morocco
- Region: Taza-Al Hoceima-Taounate
- Province: Taounate

Population (2004)
  - Total: 8,282
- Time zone: UTC+0 (GMT)

Moulay Abdelkrim is a commune in the Taounate Province of the Taza-Al Hoceima-Taounate administrative region of Morocco. At the time of the 2004 census, the commune had a total population of 8282 people living in 1418 households.
