= El Gouzate =

Coordinates: 34°30′07″N 4°09′24″W

- commune
- Interactive map of El Gouzate
- Country: Morocco
- Region: Taza-Al Hoceima-Taounate
- Province: Taza

Population (2004)
  - Total: 7,710
- Time zone: UTC+0 (GMT)

El Gouzate is a commune in the Taza Province of the Taza-Al Hoceima-Taounate administrative region of Morocco. At the time of the 2004 census, the commune had a total population of 7710 people living in 1240 households.
