= Ourtzagh =

Coordinates: 34°33′N 4°56′W

- Town
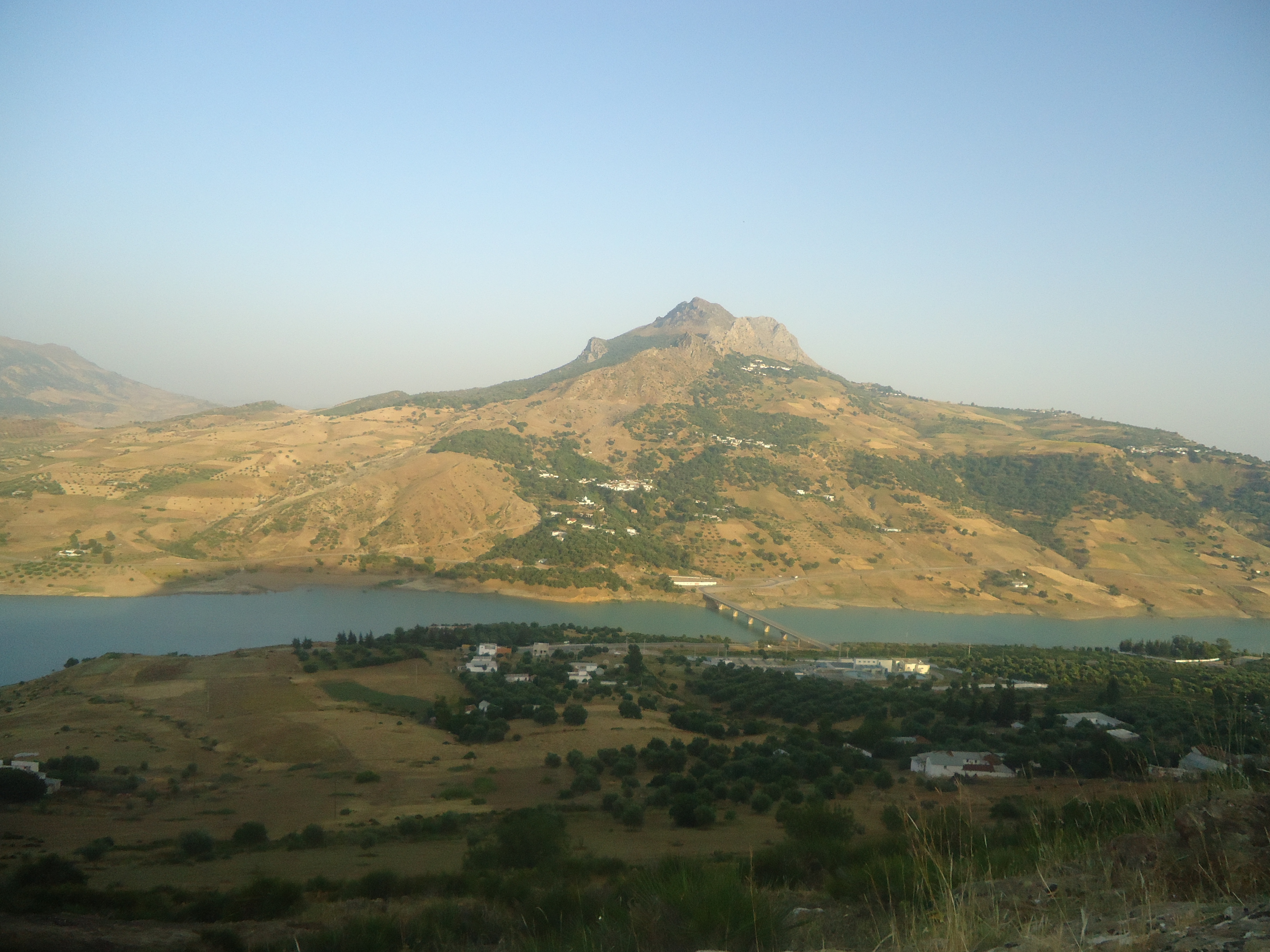
- Interactive map of Ourtzagh
- Country: Morocco
- Region: Taza-Al Hoceima-Taounate
- Province: Taounate Province

Population (2004)
  - Total: 15,216
- Time zone: UTC+0 (GMT)

Ourtzagh is a town in Taounate Province, Taza-Al Hoceima-Taounate, Morocco. According to the 2004 census, it has a population of 15,216.
