= Battle of Wadi Bou Sefiha =

- Part of Hispano-Moroccan War
Date	March 1860
Location	Oued Bou Sefiha, Tétouan, Morocco
Result	Hyayna victory

Belligerents
Hyayna	Spain

Commanders and leaders
Unknown	Leopoldo O'Donnell

Strength
Unknown	Unknown

Casualties and losses
Unknown	Very heavy casualties and numerous wounded

The Battle of Wadi Bou Sefiha, also write Oued Bou Sefiha, was a clash between Spanish forces and volunteer mujahideen from the Hyayna tribe near the Bou Sefiha River (Oued Bou Sefiha) in the Tetouan region during the Hispano-Moroccan War.

== Context ==
March 1860 marked the beginning of the end of the Hispano-Moroccan War, which resulted in Morocco's defeat. During the course of 1860, a voluntary and independent surge from the Hyayna tribe joined the conflict as mujahideen within the context of a defensive Jihad. This movement is described in Moroccan historiography as "heroic".

== Events ==
From his camp in Tétouan, Commander O'Donnell decided to advance toward the Moroccan camp. Local villagers, having noticed this maneuver, decided to prepare for battle. This coincided with the arrival of the Hyayna mujahideen, who were described as filled with courage, determination, and rage against the enemy, boosting the morale and resolve of the other soldiers.

The Moroccans then decided to march against the enemy, and the two armies met near the Bou Sefiha River (Oued Bou Sefiha). From then on, the advantage shifted toward the Hyayna troops, who inflicted such a high number of casualties among the Spanish ranks that they were described as "incalculable". Due to their sheer volume, it was "impossible" to bury the corpses individually, and they were subsequently placed in mass graves. This battle is described as a stinging defeat for the Spanish, with credit for the Moroccan victory being attributed to the Hyayna.
