= Bni Ftah =

Bni Ftah بني افتح
- commune
- Interactive map of Bni Ftah
- Country: Morocco
- Region: Taza-Al Hoceima-Taounate
- Province: Taza

Population (2004)
  - Total: 12,378
- Time zone: UTC+0 (GMT)

Bni Ftah is a commune in the Taza Province of the Taza-Al Hoceima-Taounate administrative region of Morocco. At the time of the 2004 census, the commune had a total population of 12378 people living in 1819 households.
