= Sidi El Abed =

Sidi El Abed سيدي العابد
- commune
- Interactive map of Sidi El Abed
- Country: Morocco
- Region: Taza-Al Hoceima-Taounate
- Province: Taounate

Population (2004)
  - Total: 13,567
- Time zone: UTC+0 (GMT)

Sidi El Abed is a commune in the Taounate Province of the Taza-Al Hoceima-Taounate administrative region of Morocco. At the time of the 2004 census, the commune had a total population of 13567 people living in 2034 households.
