= Kaf El Ghar =

Kaf El Ghar كاف الغار
- Commune
- Interactive map of Kaf El Ghar
- Country: Morocco
- Region: Taza-Al Hoceima-Taounate
- Province: Taza

Population (2004)
  - Total: 10,343
- Time zone: UTC+0 (GMT)

Kaf El Ghar is a commune in the Taza Province of the Taza-Al Hoceima-Taounate administrative region of Morocco. At the time of the 2004 census, the commune had a total population of 10,343 people living in 1,739 households.
