= Matmata =

Matmata may refer to:

== Places ==
- Matmata, Tunisia, a town in Tunisia
- Matmata, Morocco, a town in Morocco

== Other uses ==
- Matmatah, French rock band
- Matmata Berber, Tunisian dialect

== See also ==
- Matamata, a similarly named town in New Zealand
