= Ras El Oued =

Ras El Oued may refer to:

- Ras El Oued, Algeria
- Ras El Oued, Morocco
- Ras El Oued District in Algeria

== See also ==
- Ras el Oued, a town in Taounate Province, Morocco
