= Rghioua =

- commune
- Interactive map of Rghioua
- Country: Morocco
- Region: Fès-Meknès
- Province: Taounate

Population (2004)
  - Total: 4,802
- Time zone: UTC+0 (GMT)

Rghioua is a commune in the Taounate Province of the Fès-Meknès administrative region of Morocco. At the time of the 2004 census, the commune had a total population of 4802 people living in 1032 households.
