= Ain Maatouf =

Ain Maatouf عين معطوف
- commune
- Location within Morocco
- Country: Morocco
- Region: Taza-Al Hoceima-Taounate
- Province: Taounate

Population (2004)
  - Total: 11,165
- Time zone: UTC+0 (GMT)

Ain Maatouf is a commune in the Taounate Province of the Taza-Al Hoceima-Taounate administrative region of Morocco. At the time of the 2004 census, the commune had a total population of 11165 people living in 1775 households.
