= Msila, Morocco =

Coordinates: 35°12′N 5°34′W

Msila
- commune
- Interactive map of Msila
- Country: Morocco
- Region: Taza-Al Hoceima-Taounate
- Province: Taza

Population (2004)
  - Total: 10,153
- Time zone: UTC+0 (GMT)

Msila is a commune in the Taza Province of the Taza-Al Hoceima-Taounate administrative region of Morocco. At the time of the 2004 census, the commune had a total population of 10153 people living in 1626 households.
