= Fennassa Bab El Hit =

Fennassa Bab El Hit فناسة باب الحيط
- commune
- Location within Morocco
- Coordinates: 34.611111°N 4.416944°W
- Country: Morocco
- Region: Fès-Meknès
- Province: Taounate

Population (2004)
  - Total: 12,764
- Time zone: UTC+0 (GMT)

Fennassa Bab El Hit is a commune in the Taounate Province of the Fès-Meknès administrative region of Morocco. At the time of the 2004 census, the commune had a total population of 12,764 people living in 2,108 households.
