= Bouhlou, Morocco =

Coordinates: 34°08′N 4°24′W

Bouhlou بوحلو
- commune
- Interactive map of Bouhlou
- Country: Morocco
- Region: Taza-Al Hoceima-Taounate
- Province: Taza

Population (2004)
  - Total: 9,259
- Time zone: UTC+0 (GMT)

Bouhlou is a commune in the Taza Province of the Taza-Al Hoceima-Taounate administrative region of Morocco. At the time of the 2004 census, the commune had a total population of 9259 people living in 1461 households.
