= Bani Sanus (Morocco) =

Coordinates: 34°20′57″N 5°11′33″W

Bni Snous بني سنوس
- commune
- Interactive map of Bni Snous
- Country: Morocco
- Region: Taza-Al Hoceima-Taounate
- Province: Taounate

Population (2004)
  - Total: 9,002
- Time zone: UTC+0 (GMT)

Bni Snous is a commune in the Taounate Province of the Taza-Al Hoceima-Taounate administrative region of Morocco. At the time of the 2004 census, the commune had a total population of 9002 people living in 1430 households.
