= Mkansa, Taounate Province =

Coordinates: 34°18′05″N 5°16′28″W

Mkansa
- commune
- Interactive map of Mkansa
- Country: Morocco
- Region: Taza-Al Hoceima-Taounate
- Province: Taounate

Population (2004)
  - Total: 22,705
- Time zone: UTC+0 (GMT)

Mkansa is a commune in the Taounate Province of the Taza-Al Hoceima-Taounate administrative region of Morocco. At the time of the 2004 census, the commune had a total population of 22705 people living in 3495 households.
