= Loulja =

- Town
- Interactive map of Loulja
- Country: Morocco
- Region: Fez-Meknes
- Province: Taounate Province

Population (2004)
  - Total: 16,515
- Time zone: UTC+0 (GMT)

Loulja is a town in Taounate Province, Fez-Meknes Region, Morocco. According to the 2004 census it has a population of 16,515.
