= Rachid Azzouzi =

Moroccan footballer (born 1971)

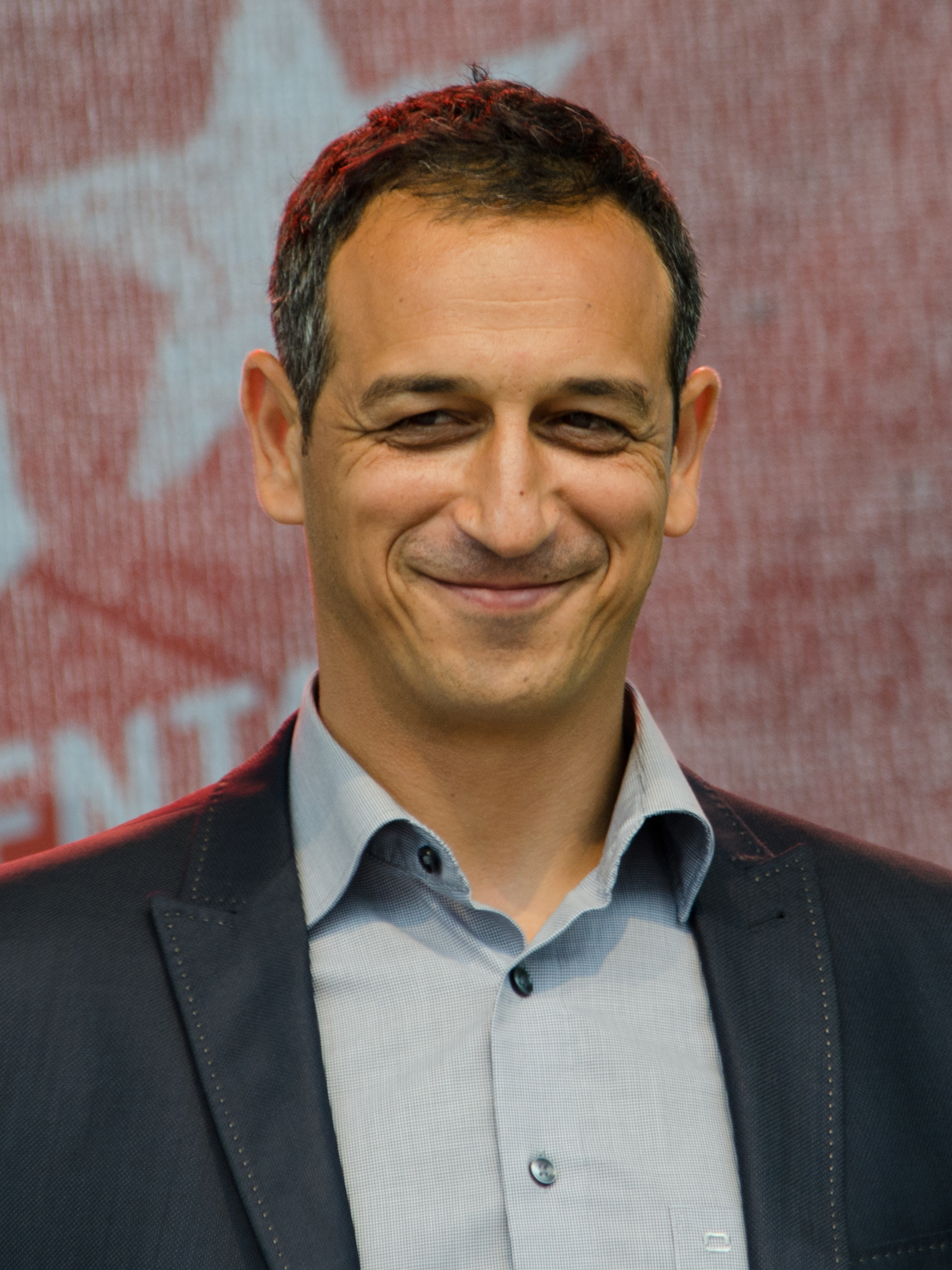
- Azzouzi in 2015.

Personal information
- Date of birth: 10 January 1971 (age 55)
- Place of birth: Taounate, Morocco
- Height: 1.81 m (5 ft 11 1/2 in)
- Position: Midfielder

Youth career
- Hertha Mariadorf
- Alemannia Mariadorf

Senior career*
Years	Team	Apps	(Gls)
1988–1989	1. FC Köln reserves		
1989–1995	MSV Duisburg	111	(4)
1995–1997	Fortuna Köln	43	(0)
1997–2003	Greuther Fürth	156	(27)
2003	Chongqing Lifan	11	(0)
2004	Greuther Fürth	12	(1)

International career
1990–1998	Morocco	37	(0)
- * Club domestic league appearances and goals

Rachid Azzouzi (Arabic: رشيد عزّوزي) (born 10 January 1971) is a Moroccan former football midfielder and current sporting director. Raised in Germany, he represented Morocco at international level.

== Early life ==
Azzouzi was born in Taounate, Morocco, and moved as a child with his family to Germany. He was raised in Rhineland.

== Club career ==
Azzouzi began playing as a youth for Hertha and Alemannia Mariadorf. In 1988, he moved to 1.FC Köln, where he would play for one year. He later played for several clubs, including MSV Duisburg from 1989 to 1995, Fortuna Köln for two years and then for SpVgg Greuther Fürth, but before which he played for half a year for Chongqing Lifan in China. In total, he played 260 second division games, in which he scored 30 goals. In his 64 Bundesliga games for MSV Duisburg he scored three times. In the 2004–05 Season he was coach of the Fürther U-17-Jugendmannschaft and was relegated with the team from the B-Jugend-Regionalliga.

== International career ==
He played for the Morocco national football team and was a participant at the 1992 Summer Olympics, 1994 FIFA World Cup and at the 1998 FIFA World Cup. Azzouzi also featured in the 1992 and 1998 African Cup of Nations.

== Sporting director career ==
After the end of his playing career, Azzouzi served as assistant to the manager from 2005 to 2007, then Team-Manager in 2007-08, and then sporting director for SpVgg Greuther Fürth. On 25 May 2012, it was announced that Azzouzi will become the new sporting director of Germany second division club FC St. Pauli. On 16 December 2014, he left his position in St. Pauli. On 10 June 2015 he was signed a two-years contract as a sporting director of Fortuna Düsseldorf. However, this cooperation ended after just under a year, on 25 May 2016.

On 22 November 2017, Azzouzi returned to SpVgg Greuther Fürth as sporting director.
