= Bouchta El Hayani =

Moroccan artist (born 1952)

- Born: January , 1952; Morocco
- Occupation: Painter

Bouchta El Hayani (born 1952 in Taounate) is a Moroccan artist who started his professional career in the 1970s. Since this period, he has become one of the leading and most famous Moroccan artists, mastering drawing techniques.

El Hayani graduated from the "Ecole des Arts Appliques" in Casablanca then the "École des Beaux-Arts" in Paris. His work has been featured in several exhibitions all over the world.

Bouchta El Hayani currently lives and work in Rabat, Morocco. The artist is also a member of the board of The Moroccan Artists Association (AMAP).

== Individual exhibitions ==
- 1970: Centre Culturel Espagnol - Fès (Morocco)
- 1989 : Faculté - Béni Mellal (Morocco)
- 1991 : Galerie National Bab Rouah -Rabat (Morocco)
- 1991 : Galerie l’Atelier - Rabat
- 1992 : Galerie Flandria - Tanger (Morocco)
- 1993 : Faculté des Lettres - Fés (Morocco)
- 1994 : Galerie Rab El Kébir - Rabat
- 1995 : Jnane Palace - Fés
- 1997 : Galerie AI Manar - Casablanca (Morocco)
- 1998 : Galerie Bernanos - Paris (France)
- 1998 : Galerie Nationale Bab Rouah - Rabat
- 2000 : Inauguration de la galerie C.D.G. Rabat
- 2001 : Galerie AI Manar - Casablanca
- 2002 : Institut Français - Rabat

== Group exhibitions ==
- 1970 : Salon des artistes Indépendants - Casablanca
- 1976 : Galerie Nationale Bab Rouah - Rabat
- 1976 : Passage Souterrain - Casablanca
- 1977 : Salle des Fêtes - Rabat
- 1977 : Cinq Peintres à Milan (Italy)
- 1977 : Bruxelles (Belgium)
- 1977 : Galerie Structure BS - Rabat
- 1980 : Galerie Structure BS - Rabat
- 1981 : Première Biennale de la ville de Tunis - Galerie Yahia - Tunis (Tunisia)
- 1981 : Festival d’Asilah (Morocco)
- 1981 : Art marocain, Bordeaux (France)
- 1982 : Architecture Peinture, Musée des Oudayas - Rabat
- 1983 : Festival marocain (Disney World), Florida (USA)
- 1983 : Arts Plastiques méditerranéens, Casablanca
- 1984 : Semaine Culturelle du Maroc, Dakar (Sénégal)
- 1985 : Exposition à Laayoune (Morocco)
- 1985 : Galerie l’Atelier, Rabat
- 1985 : Faculté des lettres Ben Msik, Casablanca
- 1985 : Galerie Nationale Bab Rouah, Rabat
- 1985 : Concours International de Sculpture sur Neige, Québec (Canada)
- 1986 : 11 Peintres, 11 Poêtes et Hommes de Lettres, Galerie Marsam, Rabat
- 1987 : Faculté des Lettres, Kênitra (Morocco)
- 1987 : Musée des Oudayas, Rabat
- 1987 : 10ème Anniversaire de la Revue AI Assas, Les Oudayas, Rabat *1987 : Rencontre Plasticiens — Artisans et Architectes, Marrakech (Morocco)
- 1988 : Semaine culturelle marocaine au Caire, Cairo (Egypt)
- 1990 : Salon d’Automne Musée des Oudayas, Rabat
- 1990 : Bab El Kébir, Rabat
- 1990 : Exposition à El Hoceima (Morocco)
- 1990 : Alliance Franco-Marocaine, Rabat)
- 1991 : OMDH Galerie Nationale Bab Rouah, Rabat
- 1992 : Exposition de l’AMAP Galerie Nationale Bab Rouah, Rabat
- 1993 : Exposition de OMDH (Switzerland)
- 1994 : Galerie Hamzat Wasl (AI Wassiti), Casablanca (Morocco)
- 1994 : Des peintres à l’Hôpital d’enfants, Rabat
- 1994 : Librairie Omar ai khayam - Casablanca
- 1995 : Galerie Nationale Bab Rouah - Rabat
- 1996 : Empreintes sur Tapis, Bordeaux (France)
- 1996 : Empreintes sur Tapis BMCE, Paris (France)
- 1997 : Semaine marocaine (Monaco)
- 1997 : Trente années de peinture abstraite au Maroc, Galerie AI Manar, Casablanca
- 1997 : Empreintes sur Tapis (United Arab Emirates)
- 1997 : Professeurs - Peintres BCM, Casablanca
- 1997 : Professeurs - Peintres Galerie Nationale Bab Rouah, Rabat
- 1998 : Regard sur l’Art n° XII, Paris
- 1998 : Cité internationale des arts, Paris
- 1998 : Galerie Michel Ray, Paris
- 1999 : Rencontre à Maskite de l’art plastique arabe (Oman)
- 1999 : Peintres en partage (Espace des Blancs Manteaux), Paris
- 1999 : Villas des arts, Musée d’art contemporain, Casablanca
- 1999 : Itinéraires 99 - Mouvement artistique de Levallois, art contemporain (France)
- 2000 : 1/2000 exposition Jacques cartier (France)
- 2000 : Peinture contemporaine marocaine : Exposition itinérante (Spain)
- 2000 : Exposition, Galerie Bab Rouah, Rabat
- 2000 : Exposition à El Jadida (Morocco)
- 2000 : Exposition à la faculté d’Aïn-chok, Casablanca
- 2000 : Artistes peintres à Durban, Durban (South Africa)
- 2001 : Parcours d’Artistes, Rabat
- 2001 : Exposition de peintres marocains (Syria)
- 2002 : Biénale de peintures sur papier (Bangladesh)
- 2002 : Peinture marocaine (Koweit)
- 2002 : Mawâzine ateliers portes ouvertes, Rabat
- 2002 : Arkadi 6éme biénale (Ivory Coast)
- 2002 : Centre Culturel de l’Agdal, Rabat
- 2003 : Hommage à Kacimi : Bab Rouah, Rabat
- 2004 : Exposition “Vision actuelle” à l’Université Al-Akhawaïn, Ifrane (Morocco)
- 2004 : Hommage à Chaïbia - Al-Jadida (Morocco)
- 2004 : Exposition G.E.N.A.P à la Cathédrale, Casablanca
- 2004 : 1ere journée mondiale contre la corruption organisée par Transparency (Morocco)
- 2004 : Maroc - Galerie Hay Ryad, CDG, Rabat
