= Jbarna =

Coordinates: 34°30′N 3°55′W

- commune
- Interactive map of Jbarna
- Country: Morocco
- Region: Fès-Meknès
- Province: Taza

Population (2004)
  - Total: 3,456
- Time zone: UTC+0 (GMT)

Jbarna is a commune in Taza Province of the Fès-Meknès administrative region of Morocco. At the time of the 2004 census, the commune had a total population of 3456 people living in 622 households.
