= Rbaa El Fouki =

Rbaa El Fouki الربع الفوقي
- commune
- Interactive map of Rbaa El Fouki
- Coordinates: 34.384°N 4.283°W
- Country: Morocco
- Region: Fès-Meknès
- Province: Taza

Population (2004)
  - Total: 8,498
- Time zone: UTC+0 (GMT)

Rbaa El Fouki is a commune in the Taza Province of the Fès-Meknès administrative region of Morocco. At the time of the 2004 census, the commune had a total population of 8498 people living in 1261 households.
