= Ratba =

Coordinates: 34°47′N 4°56′W

- commune
- Interactive map of Ratba
- Country: Morocco
- Region: Fès-Meknès
- Province: Taounate

Population (2004)
  - Total: 15,744
- Time zone: UTC+0 (GMT)

Ratba is a commune in the province of Taounate of the Fès-Meknès administrative region of Morocco. At the time of the 2004 census, the commune had a total population of 15,744 people living in 2950 households.
