= Maghraoua, Morocco =

Maghraoua
- commune
- Location within Morocco
- Coordinates: 33.932222°N 4.045556°W
- Country: Morocco
- Region: Taza-Al Hoceima-Taounate
- Province: Taza

Population (2004)
  - Total: 10,406
- Time zone: UTC+0 (GMT)

Maghraoua is a commune in the Taza Province of the Taza-Al Hoceima-Taounate administrative region of Morocco. At the time of the 2004 census, the commune had a total population of 10,406 people living in 1,509 households.
