= Taounate =

Taounate Arabic: تاونات Standard Moroccan Tamazight: ⵜⴰⵡⵏⴰⵜ
- Town
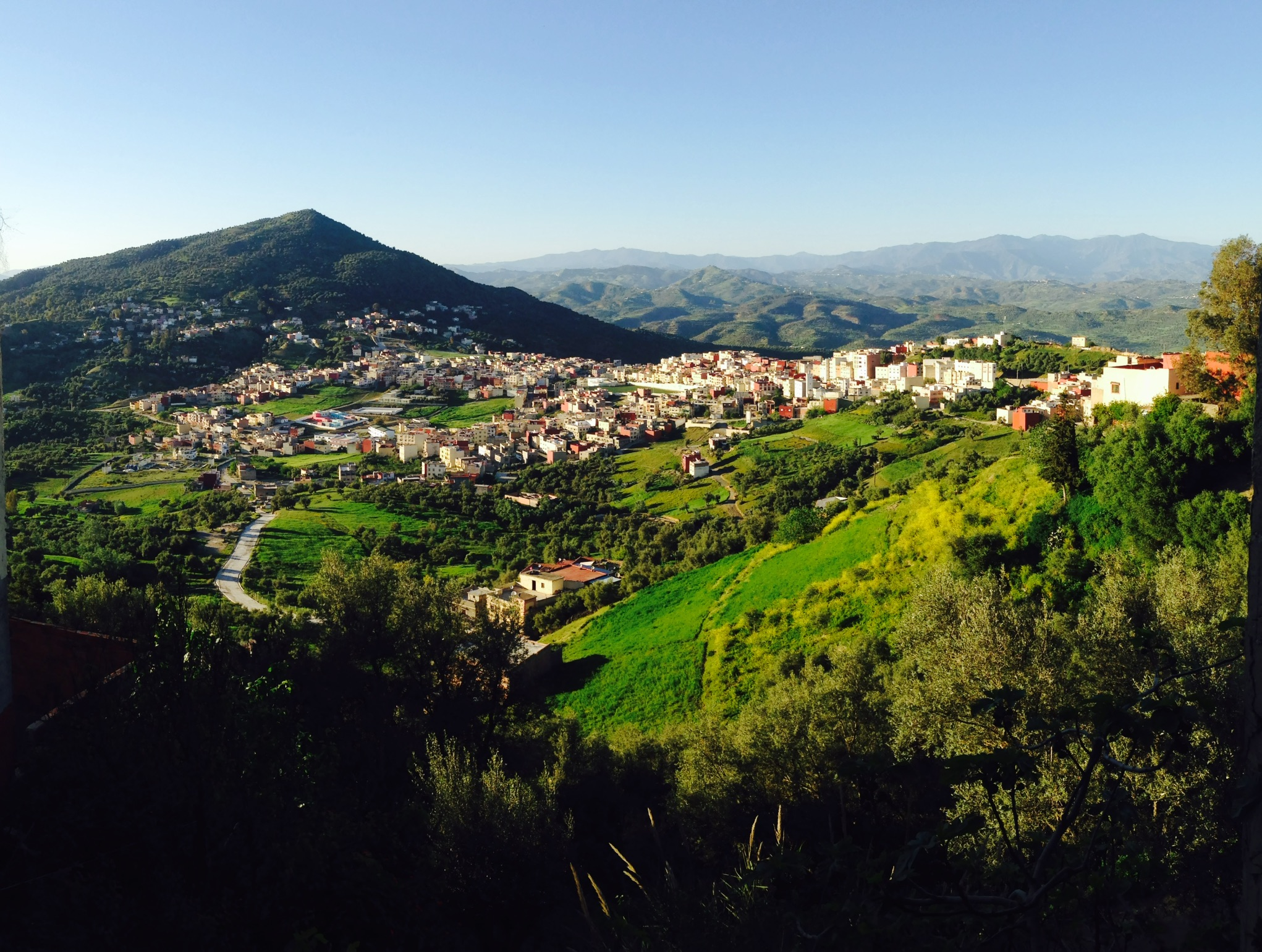
- Town of Taounate
- Interactive map of Taounate
- Coordinates: 34°32′9″N 4°38′24″W
- Country: Morocco
- Region: Fès-Meknès
- Province: Taounate Province
- Elevation: 566 m (1,857 ft)

Population (2014)
  - Total: 37,616
- Time zone: UTC+0 (GMT)

Taounate (Arabic: تاونات; Standard Moroccan Tamazight: ⵜⴰⵡⵏⴰⵜ) is a town in northern Morocco, and is the capital of Taounate Province. The town had 37,616 inhabitants as of the 2014 Moroccan census.

== Geography ==
Taounate is located in the southern Rif Mountains, and the river Oued Sra and gorges are nearby. The town is situated on a plateau that overlooks the valley of the Oued Sra, as well as the Gargara gorges.

== Infrastructure ==
In 2016, it was announced that a highway development plan, estimated to be completed by 2035, will benefit the Taounate area, the highway being called the "Fès-Taounate Axis".

West of Taounate is the Al Wahda Dam on the Ouergha River, which is the largest dam in Morocco and the second largest in North Africa.

== Economy ==
Taounate's economy is led by the agriculture sector, specifically fig farming. In addition to figs, cherries, pears, apples, and olives are also grown. Cattle, cereal production, and timber are important industries. Cannabis is also cultivated in the area.

== Culture ==
The area surrounding Taounate is generally mountainous, and cereals (mostly wheat) and cattle are intensively raised at lower elevations. Fruits (including figs, olives, cherries, apples, and pears) are grown in the well-watered mountain valleys. Higher elevations are covered with commercially exploited cedars and cork oaks. The area is inhabited mostly by Imazighen (Berbers); the more isolated groups speak only Riff, an Amazigh dialect, and the less isolated groups are generally bilingual, speaking both Riff and Arabic.

Taounate is home to an annual Festival of Figs, organized by the Regional Directorate of Agriculture of Fez-Meknes. The festival includes many varieties of figs. Friday is market day in Taounate.

Union Sportive de Taounate represents Taounate in association football.

== Notable people ==
- Mustapha Bakkoury (born 1964), businessman, engineer and politician
- Bouchta El Hayani, painter
- Rachid Azzouzi, Former Moroccan footballer and sporting manager
- Nasser Bourita, (born 27 1969), Moroccan diplomat serving as the Minister of Foreign Affairs, African Cooperation and Moroccan Expatriates since 2017

== Gallery ==
A market with men and women. Waterjars made from old tyres and their maker. Donkeys, 1997

A market with waterjars, 1997

A white farm seen from above with a typical white washed triangular haystack, 1997.

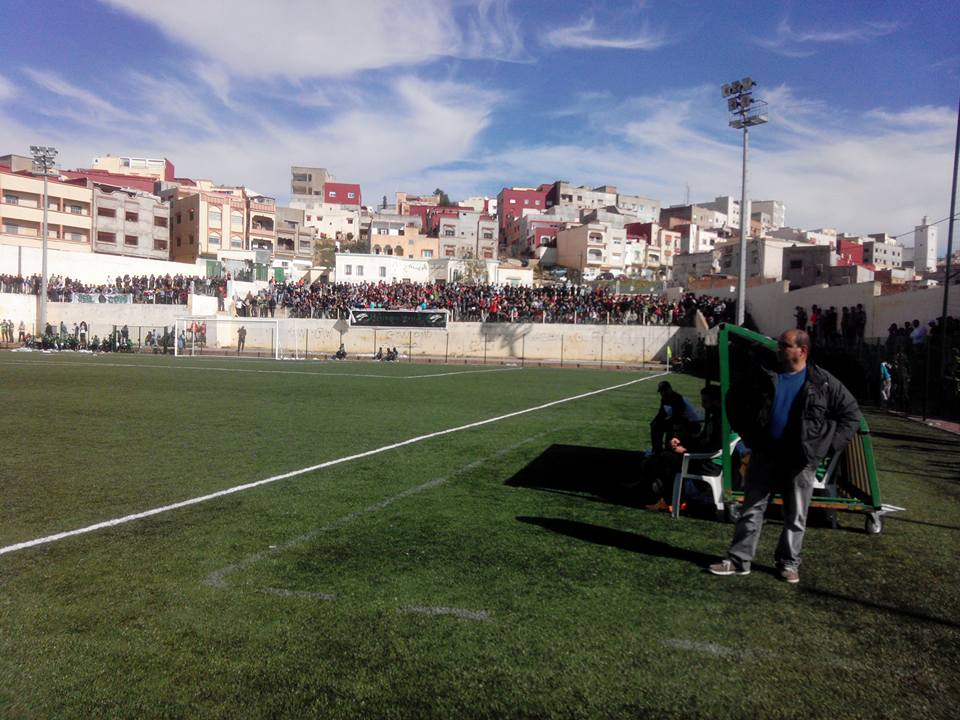
The "16 November" football stadium, pictured in 2016
