= Tainaste =

Coordinates: 34.5573°N 4.1360°W

- Town
- Interactive map of Tainaste
- Country: Morocco
- Region: Fès-Meknès
- Province: Taza Province

Population (2004)
  - Total: 1,905
- Time zone: UTC+0 (GMT)

Tainaste is a town in Taza Province, Fès-Meknès, Morocco. According to the 2004 census it has a population of 1,905.
