= Taza Province =

Province of Morocco

Coordinates: 34°13′26″N 4°00′24″W

Taza Province إقليم تازة ⵜⴰⵙⴳⴰ ⵏ ⵜⴰⵣⴰ
- Province
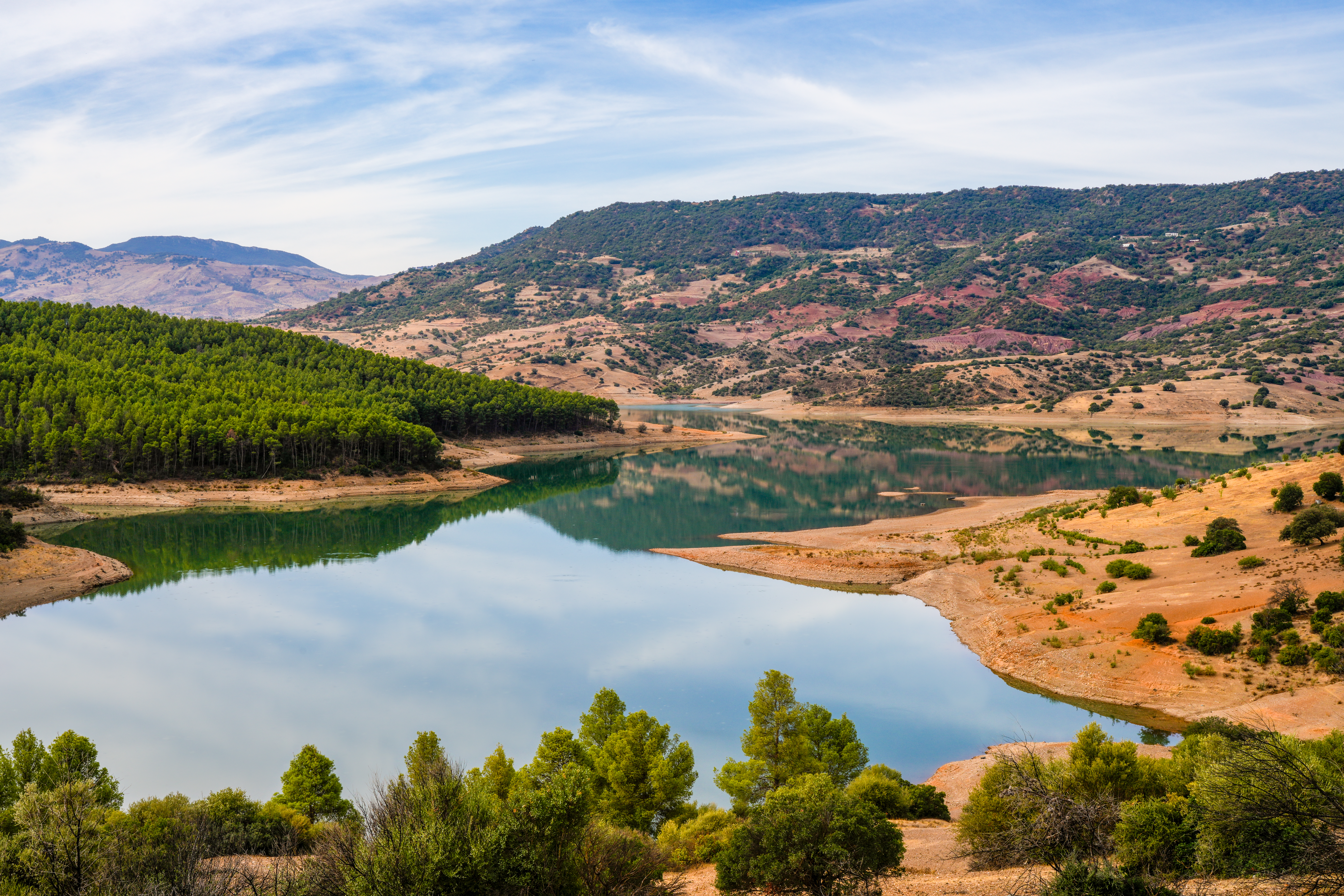
- Bab Louta Reservoir, Tazekka National Park

- Flag
- Interactive map of Taza Province
- Country: Morocco
- Region: Fès-Meknès
- Seat: Taza

Population (2024)
  - Total: 500,971

Taza Province is a largely rural province in northeastern Morocco, located within the Fès-Meknès region. It is named after its capital, the city of Taza, and occupies a strategic position between the Rif Mountains and the Middle Atlas.

== Geography ==
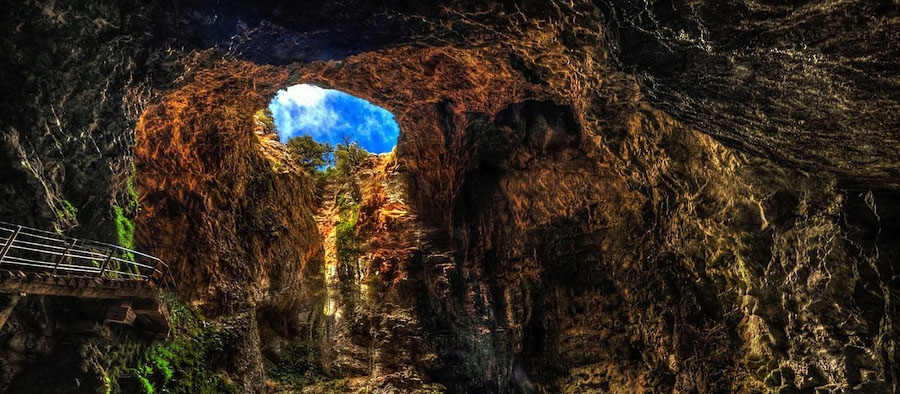
Friouato Caves

The province lies in a transitional zone linking the Rif and the Middle Atlas mountain ranges. Its terrain is predominantly mountainous, with elevations ranging from low valleys to peaks exceeding 3,000 meters in the Bouiblane massif.

A key geographic feature is the Taza corridor, formed by the valley of the Inaouen River, which serves as a natural passage between eastern and western Morocco. This corridor has historically played an important role in transportation and settlement.

The province is bordered by Al Hoceïma Province and Driouch Province to the north, Guercif Province to the east, Sefrou Province to the south, and Taounate Province to the west.

The Tazekka National Park is located within the province, near the city of Taza, and is known for its forests, caves, and biodiversity.

== History ==
Taza Province was established as part of Morocco’s administrative organization and has undergone territorial changes over time, notably with the creation of Guercif Province in 2009, which reduced its area.

== Economy ==
The economy of the province is mainly based on agriculture and livestock farming, supported by the presence of fertile valleys such as that of the Inaouen River.

Due to its mountainous terrain, industrial activity remains limited, while small-scale trade and local markets play a significant role in the economy.

== Administrative organization ==
Communes of Taza Province

Taza Province includes a number of urban municipalities and rural communes organized into administrative circles. The city of Taza serves as the administrative and economic center.

The province is divided administratively into the following:

=== Municipalities ===
Name	Geographic code	Households (2024)	Population (2024)
Aknoul	561.01.01.	1208	4410
Oued Amlil	561.01.05.	2544	10929
Tahla	561.01.07.	7619	28612
Taza	561.01.11.	40727	150763

=== Rural communes ===
Name	Geographic code	Households (2024)	Population (2024)	Notes
Ait Saghrouchen	561.09.01.	4098	15147	
Ajdir	561.03.01.	2288	8640	Urban centre: Ajdir (1,370 inhabitants; 381 households)
Bab Boudir	561.13.01.	1013	4209	
Bab Marzouka	561.13.03.	3995	17323	
Bni Frassen	561.07.01.	4668	19873	
Bni Ftah	561.11.01.	2363	9632	
Bni Lent	561.13.05.	2638	10801	
Bouchfaa	561.07.03.	2396	10093	
Bouhlou	561.07.05.	2007	8510	
Bourd	561.03.03.	1770	6996	
Bouyablane	561.09.03.	363	1667	
Brarha	561.11.03.	1462	6625	
El Gouzate	561.11.05.	1462	5942	
Galdamane	561.13.07.	4840	21732	
Ghiata Al Gharbia	561.07.07.	4703	22437	
Gzenaya Al Janoubia	561.03.05.	2081	8125	
Jbarna	561.03.07.	640	2328	
Kaf El Ghar	561.11.07.	1846	7060	
Maghraoua	561.13.15.	1664	6775	
Matmata	561.09.07.	2942	11665	Urban centre: Matmata (2,423 inhabitants; 641 households)
Meknassa Acharqia	561.13.09.	1288	5197	
Meknassa Al Gharbia	561.13.11.	832	3422	
Msila	561.11.09.	1957	7800	
Oulad Chrif	561.13.13.	1819	7882	
Oulad Zbair	561.07.09.	3716	17562	Urban centre: Oulad Zbair (6,687 inhabitants; 1,512 households)
Rbaa El Fouki	561.07.11.	1352	6156	
Sidi Ali Bourakba	561.03.09.	1698	6280	
Smià	561.09.09.	1893	7385	
Taifa	561.11.11.	1527	6000	
Tainaste	561.11.13.	2532	10411	Urban centre: Tainaste (1,539 inhabitants; 450 households)
Tazarine	561.09.11.	576	2030	
Tizi Ouasli	561.03.11.	1490	5436	Urban centre: Tizi Ouasli (1,677 inhabitants; 464 households)
Traiba	561.11.15.	1494	5773	
Zrarda	561.09.13.	2512	9343	Urban centre: Zrarda (4,303 inhabitants; 1,178 households)
