= Ghafsai =

Ghafsai غفساي
- Town
- Location of Ghafsai in Morocco.
- Coordinates: 34.6280°N 4.9109°W
- Country: Morocco
- Region: Fès-Meknès
- Province: Taounate Province

Population (2014)
  - Total: 6,361
- Time zone: UTC+0 (GMT)

Ghafsai (Arabic: غفساي) is a town in Taounate Province, in the region of Fas-Meknas, Morocco. It is located in the Rif Mountains. As of the 2014 Moroccan census, Ghafsai has 6,361 inhabitants.

== History ==
After being controlled by the Kingdom of Morocco in the previous decades, Ghafsai was within Spanish Morocco from 1912 to 1921, and then the Rif Republic ruled over the Rif region, including Ghafsai, from 1921 to 1926. In the Rif War of the 1920s Interwar Period, Ghafsai was within the warzone. After the Rif Republic lost the war, the area returned under Spanish control.

During the Ifni War in the 1950s, the Moroccan Army of Liberation used Ghafsai as one of their centers of operations against the Spanish and French.

In January 2016, 18 urban development projects spanning over 22 hectares (54 acres) of land were announced to be in progress. Grants for a house relocation project totaled 8.63 million Moroccan dirhams, while the cost for a new sewage system was estimated at 47 million dirhams. Construction of a shopping center, a school, a sports complex, car parking area, economic development area, parks, a landfill, and an electrical network overhaul are also planned. In total, all of these new projects are estimated to add up to the cost of over 300 million dirhams.

== Geography ==
Ghafsai is located in the Rif Mountains in the northern part of Morocco.

== Economy ==
Ghafsai is one of the major producers of cannabis in Morocco, but in recent years other agriculture and beekeeping ventures have developed also. Faba beans and barley are also produced in Ghafsai.
