= Aknoul =

Aknoul أكنول ⴰⴽⵏⵓⵍ Ichawiyen
- Town
- Interactive map of Aknoul
- Coordinates: 34°39′N 3°52′W
- Country: Morocco
- Region: Fès-Meknès
- Province: Taza Province

Population (2014)
  - Total: 4,403
- Time zone: UTC+0 (GMT)
- Postal code: 35050

Aknoul or Ichawiyen is a town in Taza Province, Fès-Meknès, Morocco. According to the 2014 census, it had a population of 4,403.
