= Oued Amlil =

Coordinates: 34°12′N 4°17′W

Oued Amlil واد أمليل – ⴰⵙⵉⴼ ⴰⵎⵍⵉⵍ (Asif Amlil)
- Town
- Interactive map of Oued Amlil
- Country: Morocco
- Region: Fez-Meknes
- Province: Taza

Population (2014)
  - Total: 10,405
- Time zone: UTC+0 (GMT)

Oued Amlil (Amazigh: Asif Amlil; Arabic: واد أمليل) is an urban commune and town in Taza Province, in the Fès-Meknès region of Morocco. At the 2014 census it had 10,405 inhabitants. A 2024 estimate places the population around 10,929.

== Etymology ==
The Arabic oued/wadi means “river,” while in Amazigh asif means “river” and amlil means “white.”

== Transport ==
Oued Amlil lies on the A2 Rabat–Oujda motorway, with its own interchange.

The town has a railway station, locally known as La Gare. It serves regional train lines to Fès and beyond.

National Route N6 also passes through, connecting Oued Amlil to Fès and Taza.

== Neighborhoods ==
A distinctive neighborhood built around the train station—often referred to simply as La Gare (meaning "train station") by locals, regardless of language.

== Demographics ==
- 2004: 8,246 inhabitants
- 2014: 10,405 inhabitants (official census)
- 2024 (estimate): 10,929 inhabitants

== Economy ==
Oued Amlil's economy thrives on its grilled meat restaurants, especially noted by people traveling—many bus drivers and passengers stop here for the region's cuisines.

A weekly souk on Tuesdays draws rural producers and local buyers.

== Infrastructure ==
Facilities include a Maison des Jeunes (Dar Chabab – دار شباب; English: House of Youth), a vocational center, community complex, and sports facilities, equipped with multiple soccer and basketball fields, as well as a library.

Recent development projects in Oued Amlil have included upgrades to football fields and the creation of a basketball playground (currently operating under an inscription system) under the Dar Chabab previously mentioned. Residential complexes such as the Asouk-adjacent housing complex and other new urban units have also been built to accommodate population growth.

Two major projects underway are the construction of a regional hospital and a large mosque, both situated in the growing southern zone of the town near the PAM area. These projects are considered significant for improving local healthcare and religious infrastructure.

== Culture ==
Annual cultural festivals often showcase traditional tbourida (Fantasia) equestrian performances.

== See also ==
- Taza Province
- Fès-Meknès
- Fantasia (Morocco)
