= Zrarda =

Coordinates: 34°46′N 5°50′W

- Town
- Interactive map of Zrarda
- Country: Morocco
- Region: Fès-Meknès
- Province: Taza Province

Population (2004)
  - Total: 3,680
- Time zone: UTC+0 (GMT)

Zrarda is a town in Taza Province, Fès-Meknès, Morocco. According to the 2004 census it has a population of 3,680.
