= Hyayna =

Arab tribe in Morocco

Hyayna الحياينة
- Hilalian Arab tribe
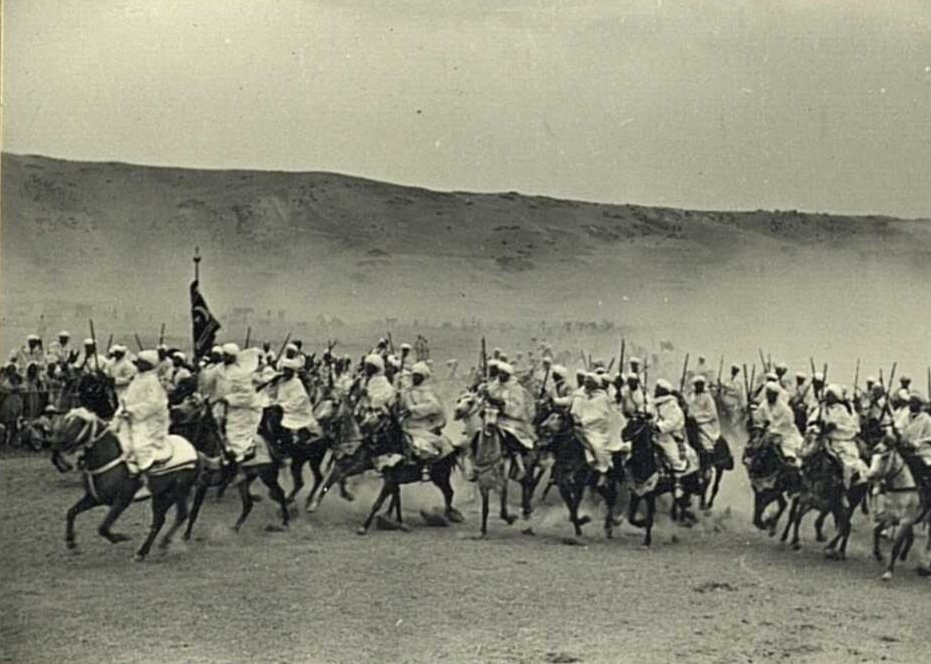
- Tbourida at Tissa, Hyayna land, 1943
- Ethnicity: Arab
- Nisba: al-Hayyani
- Location: Morocco
- Parent tribe: Banu Hilal
- Language: Arabic
- Religion: Sunni Islam

The Hyayna (Arabic: اَلْحَيَايِنَة, romanized: Ḥyāyina) or Banu Hayyan (Arabic: بَنُو حَيَّان, romanized: Banū Ḥayyān) is an Arab tribe that lives in an area north-east of Fes, east of the Sebou River, in Morocco. They are nomadic Bedouins descended from Banu Hilal. The confederation is composed of three fractions: Ouled Amran, Ouled Alian and Ouled Riab.

== Tribal Division ==
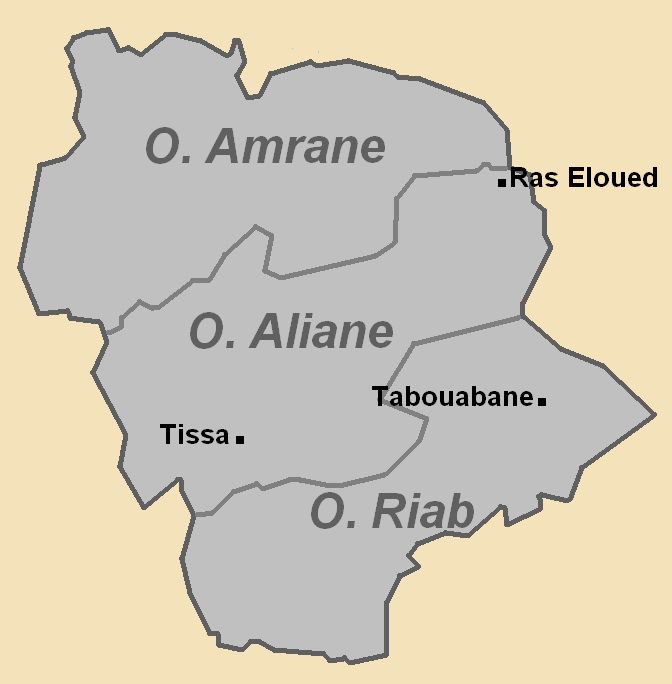
Map of the fractions of the Hyayna

Hyayna are divided into 3 branches which are the Ouled Amran, Ouled Alian and Ouled Riab based on an old legend about "Hayyan and his 3 sons".

=== Ouled Amran ===
There are at the north of Hyayna territory and he is divided in many clan : Al-Shafanah : al-Jaafrah, Awlad Bin Aainah, Awlad Amarah, al-Rashashin, Awlad al-Sultan, Jiahna, al-Hrarsha, Awlad Ghanim (Al-Amrani al-Hayani). And Awlad Youssef : Awlad Boushta (Al-Amrani), al-Mahrarin, Awlad Jamouh, Awlad Aissa (al-Amrani)

=== Ouled Alian ===
There are at the Middle of the Territory, and they are divided in many clans : Awlad Ali (al-Aliyani), Awlad Ajanna (with the Family of "al-Jannati), Awlad Tkhil (al-Aliyani) (descendants of an anciens Qaid, the Qaid Tkhil from the time of Hassan Ist, and there is a great Family of this clan named Awlad Massoud al-Tkhili al-Aliyani, descendants of Massoud al-Tkhili al-Aliyani, with this family name : [al-]Massoudi, Salili, Morjektan, al-Ghandour, al-Abd), Sedrana (with the al-Sedrati Family), al-Duama, Awlad Malouk/Malik, Awlad Hamoun, Awlad Aziz, Awlad Aaja, al-Jiahna, Awlad Hassan (al-Aliyani), Zouama, Awlad Jabr

=== Ouled Riab ===
And the Ouled Riab at south, divided in : Awlad Yahya : al-Shaashaa, al-Gharaba, Awlad Alid, and Awlad Bnikhal : al-Ghual, Awlad Hilal, al-Habarja, Bani Satitine, Awlad Abd al-Karim, al-Shababat, and Bani Khalifa

== History ==
=== Early history ===
Spanish historian Luis del Marmol Carvajal, who traveled the country in the mid-sixteenth century (precisely in 1540), spoke of a rich agricultural tribe which was made up of 25 families and provided 4,000 combatants to the Saadi dynasty.

In the seventeenth century written mention for the first time the word "Hyayna". The installation of this tribe northeast of the city of Fez seems to be in the middle of the sixteenth and the beginning of the seventeenth century, made up of Hilalian Arab guich tribes from eastern Morocco. Initially allied with the Zayyanids, they rallied to the Saadian army, and it seems they have accompanied the Saadi dynasty in their conquest of Morocco against the Wattasids, conquering Fez in 1549. Indeed, in order to close the corridor of Taza to Ottoman invaders from Algeria, Saadians implemented guich tribes (tribal soldiers) in this militarily strategic area to defend Fez. The Hyayna contributed to the Moroccan victories in the Battle of Wadi al-Laban against the Ottomans and the Battle of al-Kasr al-Kabir against the Portuguese, playing a leading role in Moroccan politics from the 16th century. During the 'Alawid era, the Hyayna participated in the Battle of Tetouan of the Hispano-Moroccan War of 1859.

=== Resistance to French colonialism ===
The Hyayna are notable for resisting French colonization. Under the leadership of Muhammad al-Hijami, they fought fierce battles against the French. They used a hit-and-run guerrilla warfare tactic and destroyed French army units stationed in its lands.

==== Siege of Fes (May 1912) ====
In 1912, following the Treaty of Fes, the Hyayna planned to attack Fes along with other tribes. The coordination that took place between al-Hijami and Raho for the attack on the city of Fez on May 16, 1912, when Al-Hijami led a movement launched from Boumershid consisting of 3,000 cavalry. The siege of Fes caused an interruption in communication lines with the western coastal front. The French forces, led by Colonel Gouraud, were able to break the siege on the city and pushed the besieging tribes back.

==== Battle of Awlad Riab (17 June 1912) ====
General Grou, with his army of six battalions, four companies, three batteries, arrived in the heart of the country of Oulad Riab on June 15, 1912, and settled in the market of Thula al-Nakhila. Three days later, the Hayaina raided the Durand Division on June 17. However, Colonel Mazillier's artillery repelled this attack, and the battle ended with the killing of eight, including Lieutenant Heitz, four missing and three wounded. The rest of this regiment was saved by a counter-attack led by Sergeant Leroz with 12 soldiers and some spahis. The resistance fighters continued to besiege this regiment, and about that, General Gouraud said: "I received a correspondence from Colonel Mazillier telling me that he was hiding in Dardara after the enemy chased him to Bani Saden, and he sustained 13 injuries as a result". General Gouraud described this battle, as it took place in a high temperature that reached 47 degrees in the shade and 57 degrees under the sun. In view of this situation, General Gouraud had to come out with his units to break the siege around the unit of Colonel Mazillier, and Commander Giralt was assigned to this operation with two platoons of skirmishers, Platoon 75, and a battalion. This succeeded in dismantling the besieging force of Muhammad al-Hijami.

==== Battle of Wadi Inawin (19 June 1912) ====
At the dawn of June 19, Commander Giralt arrived at Wadi Inawin, and he found only some groups of resistance fighters that moved from the right bank to the left bank of Wadi Inawin. As for the largest gathering of them, it was on the western side of the valley.

The battle began at one o'clock, and it continued until half past four, and these units did not cross. General Gouraud tried to rectify the situation and move in a timely manner, so he initiated sending Giridon with a platoon and company to monitor what was happening in the rear of the army, so he made sure that it was besieged by al-Hijami's resistance, and the Steimetz regiment was sent to break this siege, and this operation ended successfully, and LeRoud took control of the summits and subdued Awlad Bouisha, in addition to establishing a military center in this region, and according to that the French units mobilized all their divisions (Guillon Division and Verdet Division) and Faisal Mi llier to carry out a comprehensive attack on the besiegers, and in this regard, General Gouraud said: "The enemy is in front of us and behind us, so the archers withdrew to the back, so they suffered a lot from thirst". The siege was not completed for long, as the premeditated attack succeeded, and the summit overlooking the river was controlled, and at eight o'clock all the elements of these units camped in strategic locations, thus extending their strength over the entire region, but all of this did not end without leaving casualties. In the ranks of these forces, as one soldier was killed and twelve of them were wounded, including lieutenants Delage and Fleche.

==== Battle of Karana (22 June 1912) ====
Muhammad Al-Hijami did not hesitate to attack French units, so he raided them in Karana, but the artillery pushed him back. Gouraud said: "At about nine o’clock, cavalry appeared in the east, we thought it was the cavalry of Bani Wartin, but it was the cavalry of Bani Saden rebels, and we reached these heights, where we thought there was the presence of Sharif Al-Hijami, but he disappeared."

== Culture ==
=== Language ===
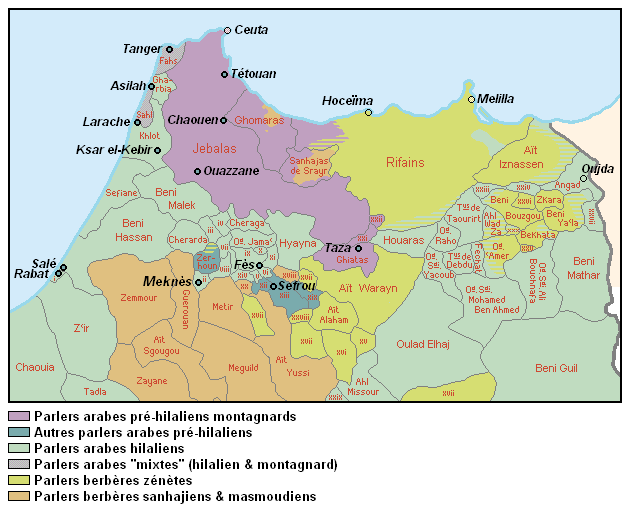
Ethno-linguistic map of northern Morocco

Hyayna tribes speak Arabic and their dialect is classified as a Hilalian dialect by many linguists. Their speech is quite similar to Cheraga's and Awlad Jamaa's ones. It is considered the closest to Classical Arabic among all the other local dialects.

=== Olive oil production ===
Alwana, also known as Ghalghoula, is a famous olive oil made from roasted green olives, which gives them their very special taste. Before the official picking, they pick the first olives, dry them in the oven, and then they are pressed in a traditional olive presses which it gives an olive oil like no other.

The Hyayna are also known for their semolina hand-crafted flat bread known as Harcha.

=== Folklore ===
The Hyayna are widely known for their traditional dance which is called Al Hayti or Hayti and Arab poetry. In this dance, most of the Hyayni dancers use the bendir and two of them use the ghayta. Hyayna, like many other Moroccan tribes, are fond of horses and Fantasia. Every year in Tissa, there is a Fantasia festival which is one of the most important festivals in the kingdom.

== See also ==
- Morocco
- Fez
