= Thar Es-Souk =

Thar Es-Souk طهر السوق
- municipality
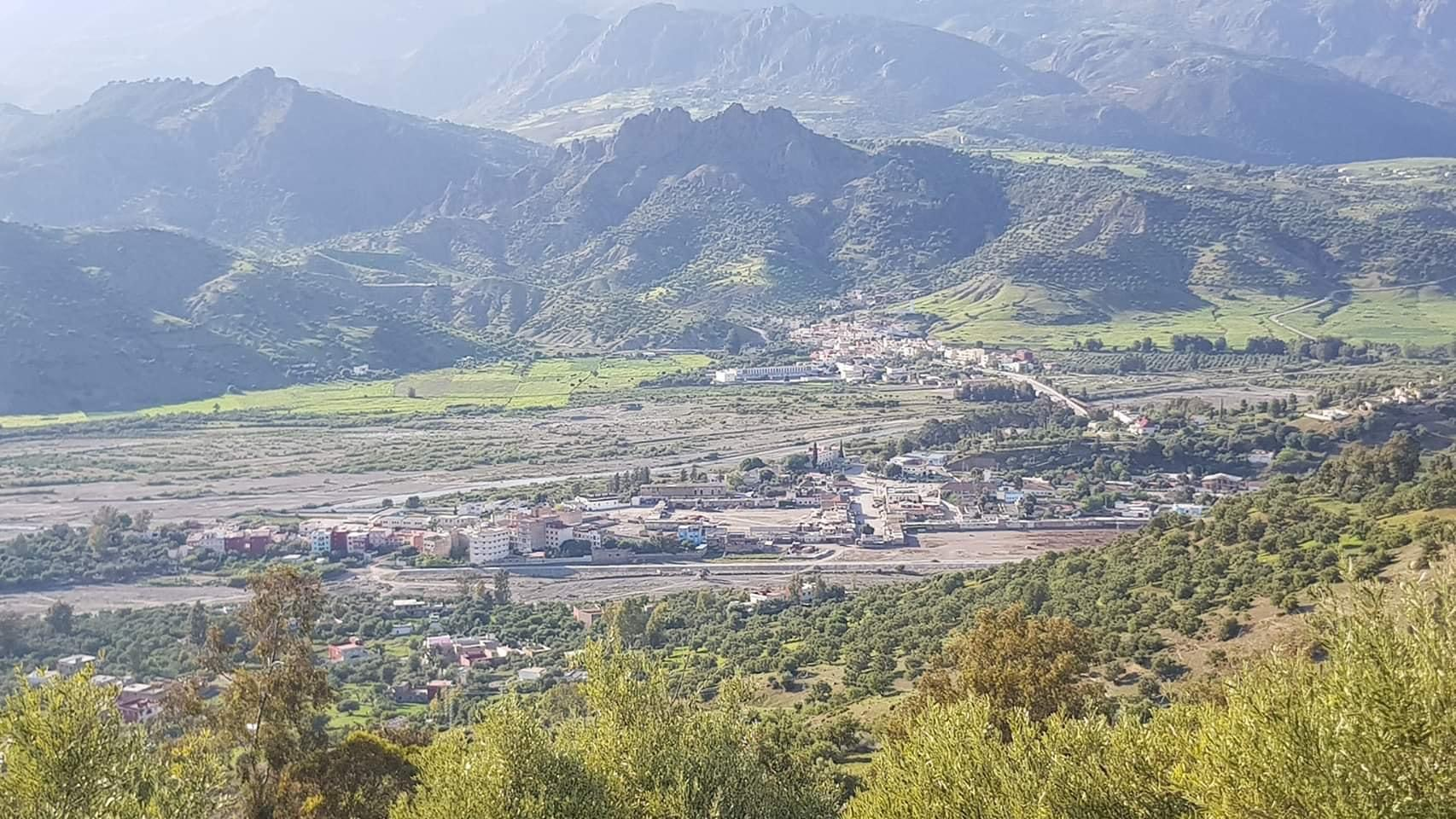

- Location within Morocco
- Coordinates: 34°39′07″N 4°16′46″W
- Country: Morocco
- Region: Taza-Al Hoceima-Taounate
- Province: Taounate

Population (2004)
  - Total: 3,792
- Time zone: UTC+0 (GMT)

Thar Es-Souk (Arabic: طهر السوق) is a municipality in the Taounate Province of the Taza-Al Hoceima-Taounate administrative region of Morocco. At the time of the 2004 census, the commune had a total population of 3792 people living in 733 households.

== Notable people ==
- Rhadi Ben Abdesselam, Olympic silver medalist runner
