= Lamkansa, Casablanca-Settat =

Lamkansa
- Town
- Location in Morocco
- Coordinates: 33.534°N 7.574°W
- Country: Morocco
- Region: Casablanca-Settat
- Prefecture: Casablanca

Population (2004)
  - Total: 33,940
- Time zone: UTC+0 (WET)
  - Summer (DST): UTC+1 (WEST)

Lamkansa is a neighbourhood in Casablanca, Morocco. According to the 2004 census it had a population of 33,940. In 2014, the population increase to 103,026 persons.
