= Tizi Ouasli =

Coordinates: 34.7624°N 3.7953°W

- Town
- Interactive map of Tizi Ouasli
- Country: Morocco
- Region: Fès-Meknès
- Province: Taza Province

Population (2014)
  - Total: 6.639
- Time zone: UTC+0 (GMT)

Tizi Ouasli is a town in Taza Province, Fès-Meknès, Morocco. According to the 2004 census it has a population of 1695.
