= Ras el Oued =

Coordinates: 34°09′N 4°00′W

- Town
- Interactive map of Ras el Oued
- Country: Morocco
- Region: Fès-Meknès
- Province: Taounate Province
- Elevation: 3,600 ft (1,100 m)

Population (2004)
  - Total: 15,949
- Time zone: UTC+0 (GMT)

Ras el Oued is a commune in Taounate Province of the Taza-Al Hoceima-Taounate administrative region, Fès-Meknès, Morocco. At the time of the 2004 census, the commune had a total population of 15,949 people living in 2438 households.
