= Karia Ba Mohamed =

- Nickname: El karia
- Interactive map of Karia Ba Mohamed
- Coordinates: 34°22′N 5°12′W
- Country: Morocco
- Region: Fès-Meknès
- Province: Taounate

Population
  - Total: 18,000
- Postal code: 34050

Karia Ba Mohamed is a city in northern Morocco, situated in the southern foothills the Rif Mountains 58 kilometres northwest of the city of Fes.

Located near the Sebou River, Karia has a population of some 18,000 people and around 2,000 houses. It is a working class farming area. The view north from the town looks towards Moulay Bouchta and the Rif Mountains in the distance. There are no hotels or municipal buildings.

Karia has a high school, and a central marketplace. The souk day is Tuesday. The high school serves students from the surrounding villages.
