= Oulad Zbair =

Coordinates: 34°17′N 4°19′W

Oulad Zbair أولاد زباير
- Town
- Interactive map of Oulad Zbair
- Country: Morocco
- Region: Fès-Meknès
- Province: Taza Province

Population (2004)
  - Total: 4,193
- Time zone: UTC+0 (GMT)

Oulad Zbair is a town in Taza Province, Fès-Meknès, Morocco. According to the 2004 census it has a population of 4,193.
