= Matmata, Morocco =

Matmata
- Town
- Location within Morocco
- Coordinates: 34°05′57.98″N 4°33′10.71″W
- Country: Morocco
- Region: Fès-Meknès
- Province: Taza Province

Population (2004)
  - Total: 2,194
- Time zone: UTC+0 (GMT)

Matmata is a town in Taza Province, Fès-Meknès, Morocco. According to the 2004 census it has a population of 2,194.
