= Tissa, Morocco =

Coordinates: 35.0228°N 4.14083°W

Tissa تيسة ⵜⵉⵙⵙⴰ
- Town
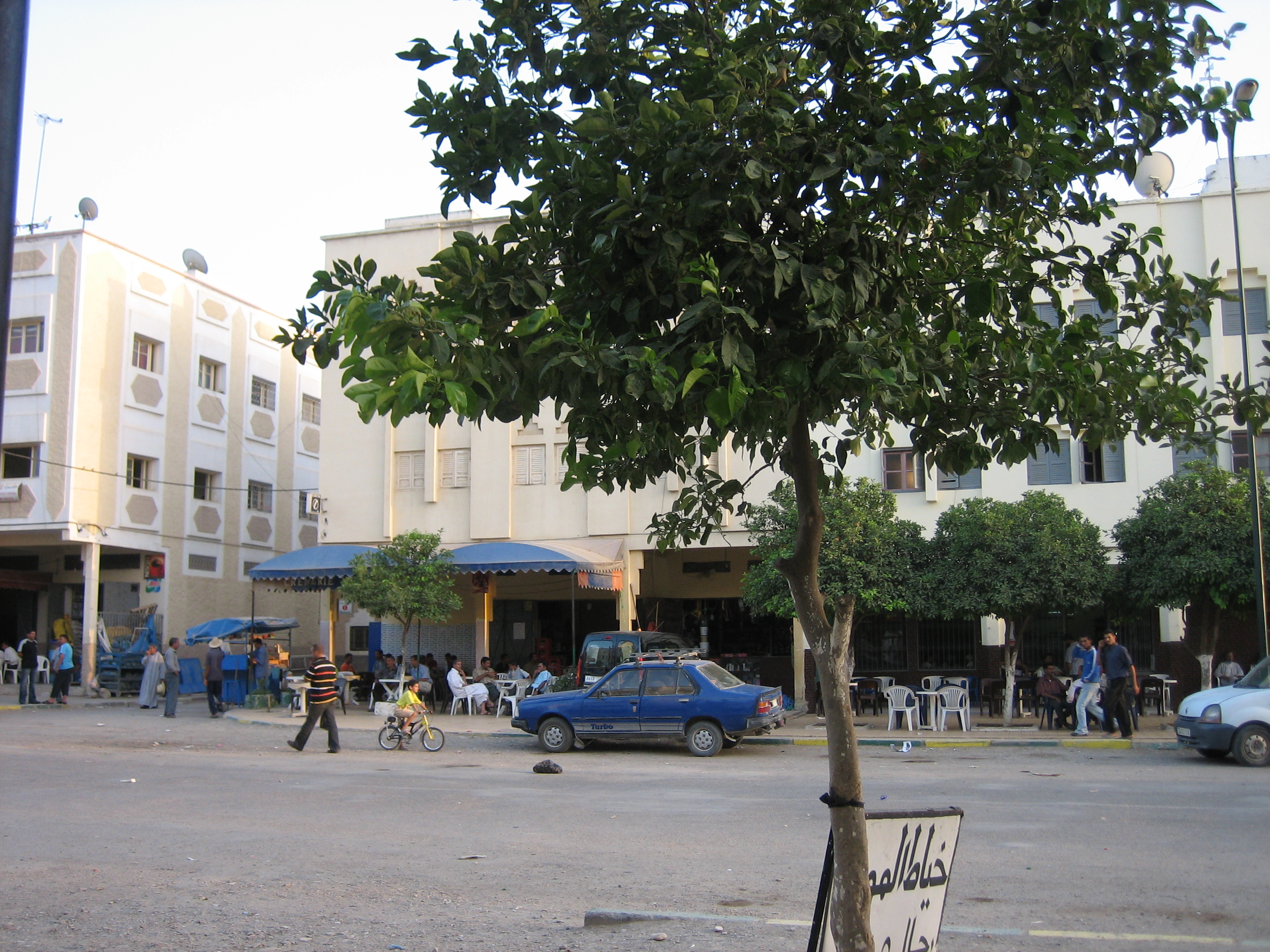
- Tissa City Centre
- Interactive map of Tissa
- Country: Morocco
- Region: Fès-Meknès
- Province: Taounate Province

Population (2024)
  - Total: 12,096
- Time zone: UTC+0 (GMT)

Tissa is a town in Taounate Province, Fès-Meknès, Morocco.
