= Taounate Province =

Coordinates: 34°32′09″N 4°38′24″W

Taounate Province إقليم تاونات ⵜⴰⵙⴳⴰ ⵏ ⵜⵡⵏⴰⵜ
- Province
- Amergou Kasbah

- Flag
- Interactive map of Taounate Province
- Country: Morocco
- Region: Fès-Meknès
- Seat: Taounate

Area
  - Total: 5,585 km^{2} (2,156 sq mi)

Population (2024)
  - Total: 612,650
  - Density: 109.7/km^{2} (284.1/sq mi)

Taounate Province (تاونات, ⵜⴰⵡⵏⴰⵜ) is a predominantly rural province in the Fès-Meknès region of northern Morocco. It is located north of Fes. As of the 2024 census, the province had a population of 612,650.

The major cities are:

- Taounate
- Tissa
- Karia Ba Mohamed

== Geography ==
Taounate Province lies in the southern foothills of the Rif Mountains and forms part of the historical Jbala region. It is bordered by Chefchaouen Province to the north, Al Hoceïma Province to the northeast, Taza Province to the east, Sidi Kacem Province to the west, Ouezzane Province to the northwest, and Fes Prefecture to the south.

The landscape is characterized by a mix of mountainous terrain in the north and rolling hills in the south, with extensive agricultural land. The area is part of several river basins, including the Ouergha and Inaouen rivers.

== History ==
Taounate Province was established in 1977 as part of Morocco’s administrative reorganization aimed at improving regional governance. The province takes its name from the town of Taounate, which serves as its administrative and economic center.

== Economy ==
The local economy is largely based on agriculture, particularly cereal cultivation, olive growing, and livestock farming. Due to its predominantly rural character, the province has a relatively low level of industrialization.

Small-scale trade and local markets also play an important role in the economic life of the province.

== Subdivisions ==
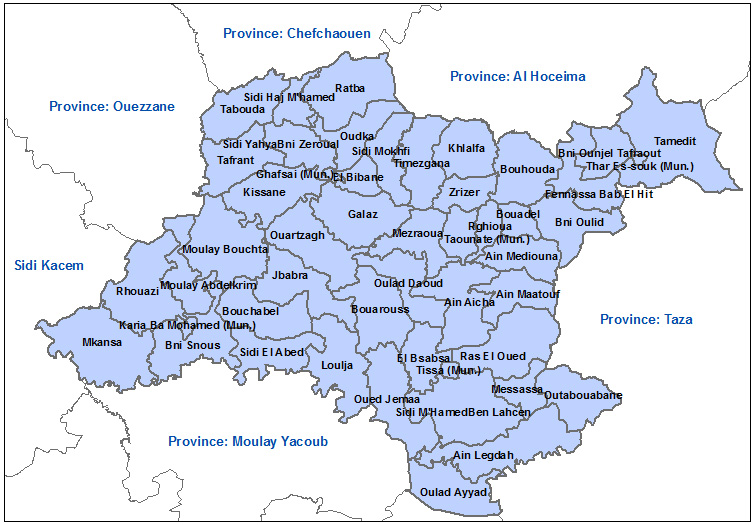
Communes of Taounate Province

Taounate Province is divided into a number of urban municipalities and rural communes, organized under several administrative circles and caïdats. The town of Taounate functions as the provincial capital and main administrative hub.

The province is divided administratively into the following:

Name	Geographic code	Type	Households	Population (2004)	Foreign population	Moroccan population	Notes
Ghafsai	531.01.01.	Municipality	1209	5492	8	5484	
Karia Ba Mohamed	531.01.03.	Municipality	3271	16712	22	16690	
Taounate	531.01.05.	Municipality	6499	32380	8	32372	
Thar Es-Souk	531.01.07.	Municipality	733	3792	0	3792	
Tissa	531.01.09.	Municipality	1824	9566	1	9565	
El Bibane	531.03.01.	Rural commune	1377	6593	0	6593	
Galaz	531.03.03.	Rural commune	3636	18471	0	18471	
Kissane	531.03.05.	Rural commune	2620	13712	0	13712	
Oudka	531.03.07.	Rural commune	1601	8392	0	8392	
Ourtzagh	531.03.09.	Rural commune	2935	15216	0	15216	
Ratba	531.03.11.	Rural commune	2950	15744	1	15743	
Sidi Haj M'Hamed	531.03.13.	Rural commune	1425	8649	0	8649	
Sidi Mokhfi	531.03.15.	Rural commune	1522	8297	0	8297	
Sidi Yahya Bni Zeroual	531.03.17.	Rural commune	2616	14930	0	14930	
Tabouda	531.03.19.	Rural commune	2747	15644	0	15644	
Tafrant	531.03.21.	Rural commune	2494	13622	0	13622	
Timezgana	531.03.23.	Rural commune	2677	15085	0	15085	
Bni Snous	531.05.01.	Rural commune	1430	9002	0	9002	
Bouchabel	531.05.03.	Rural commune	2549	16652	0	16652	
Ghouazi	531.05.05.	Rural commune	2993	18779	1	18778	
Jbabra	531.05.07.	Rural commune	2831	19076	0	19076	
Loulja	531.05.09.	Rural commune	2409	16515	0	16515	
Mkansa	531.05.11.	Rural commune	3495	22705	0	22705	
Moulay Abdelkrim	531.05.13.	Rural commune	1418	8282	1	8281	
Moulay Bouchta	531.05.15.	Rural commune	2913	16602	0	16602	
Sidi El Abed	531.05.17.	Rural commune	2034	13567	0	13567	
Ain Mediouna	531.07.01.	Rural commune	2950	16410	2	16408	
Bni Oulid	531.07.03.	Rural commune	2089	11775	3	11772	
Bni Ounjel Tafraout	531.07.05.	Rural commune	1352	8421	0	8421	
Bouadel	531.07.07.	Rural commune	2377	13691	0	13691	
Bouhouda	531.07.09.	Rural commune	4257	26124	0	26124	
Fennassa Bab El Hit	531.07.11.	Rural commune	2108	12764	1	12763	
Khlalfa	531.07.13.	Rural commune	2288	12939	0	12939	
Mezraoua	531.07.15.	Rural commune	1661	9883	0	9883	
Rghioua	531.07.17.	Rural commune	1032	4802	1	4801	
Tamedit	531.07.19.	Rural commune	3492	21453	0	21453	
Zrizer	531.07.21.	Rural commune	1500	7934	0	7934	
Ain Aicha	531.09.01.	Rural commune	3544	22575	1	22574	
Ain Legdah	531.09.03.	Rural commune	1907	12196	2	12194	
Ain Maatouf	531.09.05.	Rural commune	1775	11165	0	11165	
Bouarouss	531.09.07.	Rural commune	2855	18495	0	18495	
El Bsabsa	531.09.09.	Rural commune	1209	7997	0	7997	
Messassa	531.09.11.	Rural commune	1476	9497	0	9497	
Oued Jemaa	531.09.13.	Rural commune	1534	9983	0	9983	
Oulad Ayyad	531.09.15.	Rural commune	1386	8896	0	8896	
Oulad Daoud	531.09.17.	Rural commune	1970	12271	0	12271	
Outabouabane	531.09.19.	Rural commune	1490	10545	0	10545	
Ras El Oued	531.09.21.	Rural commune	2438	15949	0	15949	
Sidi M'Hamed Ben Lahcen	531.09.23.	Rural commune	2809	18990	0	18990	
