= Taza-Al Hoceima-Taounate =

Taza-Al Hoceima-Taounate تازة الحسيمة تاونات
- Region
- Location in Morocco
- Coordinates: 35°15′N 3°56′W
- Country: Morocco
- Capital: Al Hoceima

Area
  - Total: 24,155 km^{2} (9,326 sq mi)

Population (2014 census)
  - Total: 1,807,036
- Time zone: UTC+0 (WET)
  - Summer (DST): UTC+1 (WEST)

Taza-Al Hoceima-Taounate (Arabic: تازة الحسيمة تاونات) was formerly one of the sixteen regions of Morocco from 1997 to 2015. It was situated in northern Morocco. It covered an area of 24,155 km² and had a population of 1,807,036 (2014 census). The capital was Al Hoceima.

In the 2014 national census, it was the only region in the country whose population was less than in the 2004 census, with 77 fewer residents. In 2015, the region was incorporated with the neighbouring Tangier-Tetouan region to form the Tanger-Tetouan-Al Hoceima region.

== Administrative divisions ==
The region was made up of the following provinces:

- Al Hoceïma Province (now part of the Tanger-Tetouan-Al Hoceima Region)
- Taounate Province (now part of the Fès-Meknès Region)
- Taza Province (now part of the Fès-Meknès Region)
- Guercif Province (since 2009; now part of the Oriental Region)

== Cities ==
- Ajdir, Taza
- Ajdir
- Aknoul
- Hoceima
- Beni Bouayach
- Bni Hadifa
- Ghafsai
- Guercif
- Imzouren
- Issaguen
- Karia Ba Mohamed
- Matmata
- Oued Amlil
- Oulad Zbair
- Tahla
- Tainaste
- Tamassint
- Taounate
- Targuist
- Taza
- Thar Essouk
- Tissa
- Tizi Ouasli
- Zrarda
