= Narrow-gauge railways in former French Morocco =

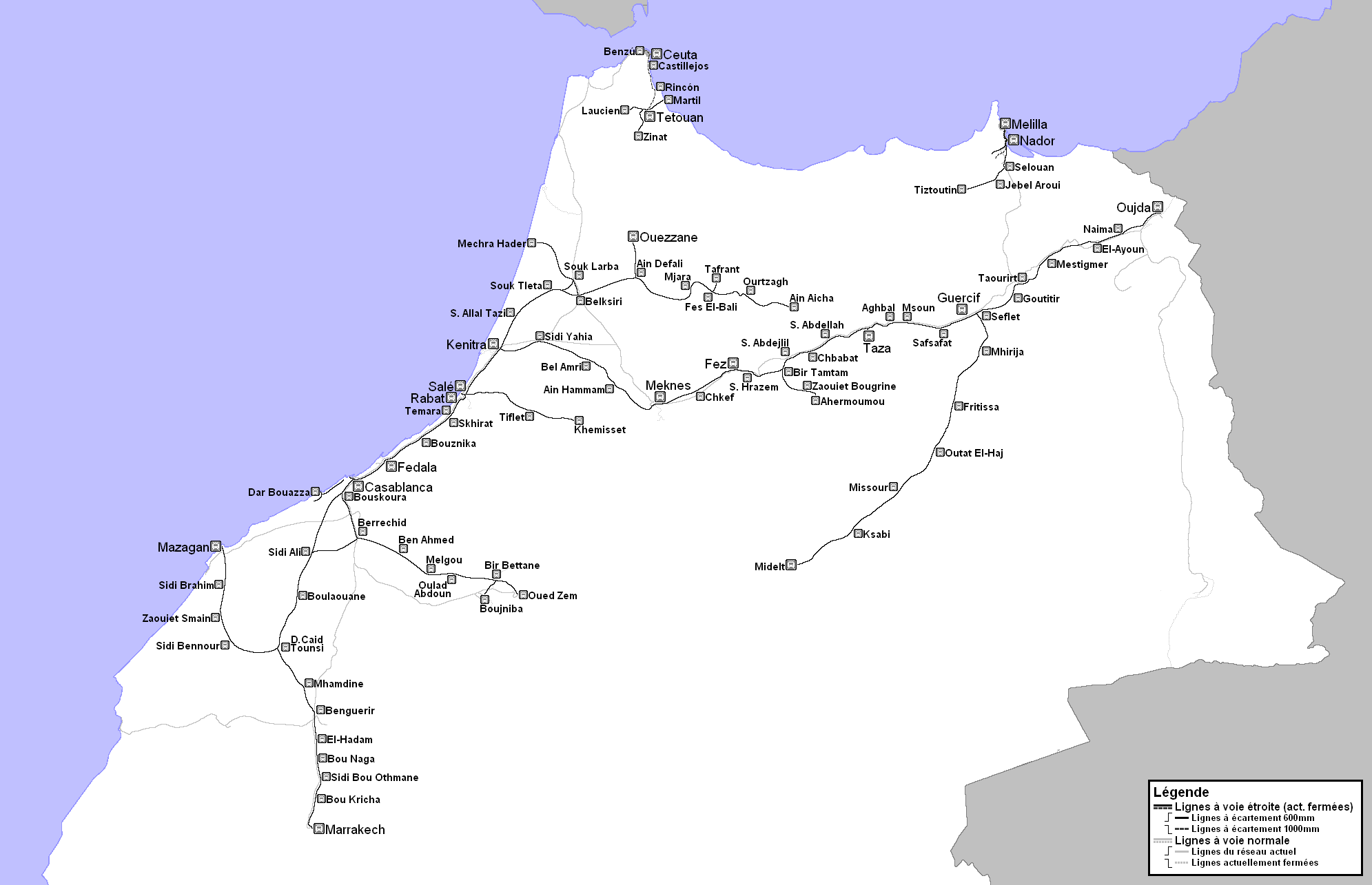
600 mm (1 ft 11 5/8 in) and 1,000 mm (3 ft 3 3/8 in) gauge networks in Morocco

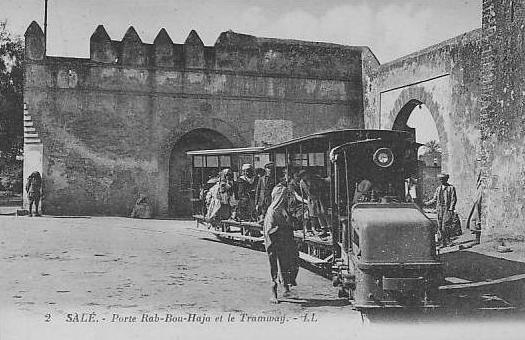
Tramway at the Porte Bab-Bouhaja in Salé

French Morocco had from 1912 to 1935 one of the largest 600 mm (1 ft 11 5/8 in) gauge network in Africa with a total length of more than 1,700 kilometres (1,100 mi). After the treaty of Algeciras where the representatives of Great Powers agreed not to build any 1,435 mm (4 ft 8 1/2 in) standard-gauge railway in Morocco until the standard-gauge Tangier–Fez railway being completed, the French begun to build military 600 mm (1 ft 11 5/8 in) gauge lines in their part of Morocco French Morocco.

The 948 km Marrakesh–Casablanca–Kenitra–Fez–Oujda line became known as Chemins de fer stratégiques du Maroc and the branch lines diverting from the line as Chemins de fer de pénétration du Maroc. These lines were mostly built during the period of 1921–1925, With the exception of Guercif–Outat Oulad el Hadj–Midelt, which was started in 1916 and completed in 1920.

== Casablanca–Boussekoura–Berrechid line ==
The first French-built narrow-gauge railway was the Casablanca–Bouskoura–Berrechid 500 mm (19 3/4 in) line, built with portable railway track from Decauville, which also delivered the rolling stock to the line. Construction started in May 1908 and the 52 km line was completed in late July 1908. The trains reached a maximum speed of 20 km/h averaging only 12 km/h between Casablanca and Berrechid.

The locomotives which worked the 500 mm gauge line have not been yet been fully identified. Sources claim:

- 3 Decauville, 500 mm (19 3/4 in) / 600 mm (1 ft 11 5/8 in), Bt-n2, built in 1905, delivered new to Touzet, Senegal.
- 3 Decauville, 500 mm (19 3/4 in) / 600 mm (1 ft 11 5/8 in), B1t-n2, built in 1907, delivered to Raguet et Heurtematte, Paris.

== Chemins de fer stratégiques du Maroc ==
=== Casablanca–Marrakesh ===
This 600 mm (1 ft 11 5/8 in) gauge line had a short life. It was completed around 1920, activities ceased in 1928.

==== Casablanca–Boussekoura–Berrechid ====
This line formed the northern part of the Casablanca–Marrakesh narrow-gauge line. In 1913 the French regauged the Casablanca–Berrechid section from 500 mm (19 3/4 in) to 600 mm (1 ft 11 5/8 in) track gauge and was opened to public service in March 1916.

==== Berrechid–Dar Caïd Tounsi ====
The Berrechid–Dar Caïd Tounsi (junction) section was completed in 1915 (109 km south of Casablanca).

==== Dar Caïd Tounsi–Marrakesh ====
The Dar Caïd Tounsi to Ben Guerir section was completed in September 1919. The final section from Ben Guerir to Marrakesh was opened in September 1920.

==== Dar Caïd Tounsi–Mazagan branch ====
Later also a branch line was built running from Dar Caïd Tounsi, which became a railway junction, to Mazagan (Harbour). This line was opened in early 1928.

=== Casablanca–Kenitra–Fez ===
The French started also to build 600 mm (1 ft 11 5/8 in) gauge railway north of Casablanca. Rabat 89 km and Port Lyautey – now Kenitra – 128 km was reached in 1913. The opening dates of this line were:

- Casablanca–Fedala, March 1912, narrow gauge closed in April 1925.
- Fedala–Rabat, December 1912, narrow gauge closed in April 1925.
- Rabat–Kenitra, April 1913, narrow gauge closed in April 1923.
- Kenitra–Meknes, June 1914, narrow gauge closed in May 1923.
- Meknes–Fez, July 1915, narrow gauge closed in September 1923.

=== Oujda–Fez ===
At Kenitra (Port Lyautey) the 600 mm (1 ft 11 5/8 in) "main line" turned towards east, the main target for the French military was a rail connection with their Algerian Railways at Oujda, where the French military had built from the Algerian side an 87 km 1,055 mm (3 ft 5 1/2 in) gauge line from Tlemcen via Marnia. This Chemin de Fer de Marnia a Taourirt was completed by 1911.

The 364 km line from Oujda to Fez was difficult to build. The railway had to go over a narrow passage between the Rif mountains in the north and the Atlas in the south. The railway line had to be built with steep gradients and sharp curves to reach – from both sides – the Touahar Pass.

East of Fez the narrow-gauge line followed the route Fez–Sidi Abdallah–Col de Touahar–Bab Marzouka–Taza–Kasba Msoun–Guercif (with branch to Midelt)–Chreia–Taourirt–El Aioun–Naima–Oujda.

Construction started simultaneously from both Fez and Oujda. When the 600 mm (1 ft 11 5/8 in) gauge line was completed, it was then possible to travel by train from Morocco to Algeria and Tunisia over the standard-gauge Chemins de fer l´Ouest Algerien.

The French source gives opening dates for sections of Oujda–Fez line:

- Oujda–El Aioun, December 1912, narrow gauge closed in January 1932.
- El Aioun–Taourirt, April 1913, narrow gauge closed in January 1932.
- Taourirt–Guercif, August 1913, narrow gauge closed in January 1932.
- Guercif–Taza, July 1915, narrow gauge closed in May 1933.
- Taza–Col de Touahar, July 1918, narrow gauge closed in May 1933.
- Col de Touahar–Sidi Abdallah, May 1918, narrow gauge closed in April 1934.
- Sidi Abdallah–Fez, July 1921, narrow gauge closed in April 1934.

== Chemins de Fer de Penetration du Maroc ==
=== Berrechid–Oued Zem line ===
During World War I the French built also a 500 mm (19 3/4 in) gauge line from Berrechid to Oued Zem. This Berrechid–Ben Ahmed line was put to service in 1916 (narrow gauge closed in August 1923) and the Ben Ahmed–Oued Zem opened in August 1917 (narrow gauge closed in July 1925).

It was intended to continue the line from Oued Zem 44 km to Kasbah Tadla but this never materialised.

=== Dar Caid Tounssi–El Jadida ===
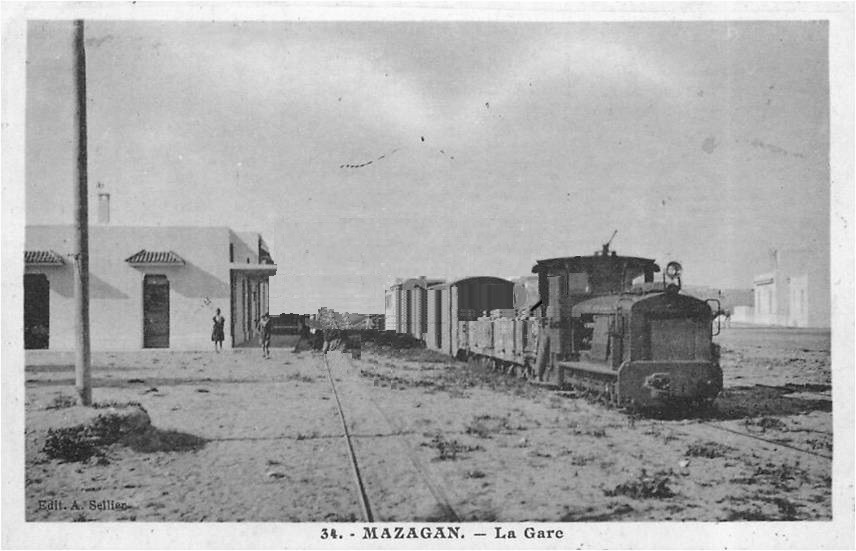
Magazan railway station

As mentioned earlier, one penetration line from Dar Caïd Tounsi to El Jadida (Magazan) was built from the Casablanca–Marrakesh line. This branch line, opened in early 1928 gave the shortest possible outlet to the Atlantic Ocean from Marrakesh. But at El Jadida the port facilities were poor and primitive.

When the standard-gauge railway from Machraa Ben Abbou to Marrakesh was opened in July 1928 the 600 mm (1 ft 11 5/8 in) narrow-gauge line between Ben Guerir and Marrakesh was closed. But its northern part, the Casablanca–Berrechid line, where the new standard gauge line runs parallel with the 52 kilometres (32 mi) long narrow-gauge Dar Caïd Tounsi–El Jadida line, remained open until the new 142 kilometres (88 mi) long standard-gauge line from Ben Guerir to Safi was opened on 7 May 1936.

=== Rabat–Tiflet–Khemisset ===
The next penetration line was the 95 km Rabat–Tiflet–Khemisset 600 mm (1 ft 11 5/8 in) gauge line running east of Rabat. This line had only a local importance but it made it possible to move the local products as well as the inhabitants in the morning train of the provincial capital to Rabat and their return during the same evening.

In addition a short branch line near Rabat was built from Bir–Tam–Tam to just built Abermoumou military garrison. This branch was completed in 1925.

In the early 1920s, widespread local resistance emerged against the French colonial administration in Morocco, particularly in the north. There, Riffian rebels under the leadership of Abd el-Krim, demanded an independent state in the Rif region. This led to open revolt against both the French and the Sultan of Moroccoin 1925–1926. At the height of the conflict, France deployed some 325,000 soldiers to pacify the Rif.

The First World War had delayed the construction of the standard-gauge Chemin de Fer de Tanger a Fès. The ongoing unrest in the Rif, combined with the need for military logistics, led the French to build a 600 mm railway network in the region.

=== Kenitra–Mechra Bel Ksiri–Ain Dfali–Aïn Aïcha ===
In 1922 first a railway line was built from Kenitra (Port Lyautey) to Mechra Bel Ksiri on the proposed Tangier–Fez railway. This line was opened to traffic in 1923.

With this narrow-gauge railway the French transferred troops and supplies during the Rif rebellion.

In addition, after World War I the French extended the 600 mm (1 ft 11 5/8 in) gauge narrow-gauge railway into the heart of Rif region, from Mechra Bel Ksiri to Ain Dfali (junction). The line was further extended to Maârif and Aïn Aïcha.

The whole railway was closed by 1935, but its remnants were still visible in the 1950s.

==== Branch line Ain Dfali–Ouezzane ====
At Ain Dfali the branch line was built via Dar Echchaouia to the city of Ouezzane.

Mechra Bel Ksiri to Ouezzane was opened in 1924 and Ain Dfali–Aïn Aïcha next year in 1925.

=== Chemin de Fer Guercif a Outat el Hadj et Midelt ===
Perhaps the most famous and "mysterious" of the 600 mm (1 ft 11 5/8 in) gauge narrow-gauge railways in Morocco was the Chemin de Fer Guercif an Outat el Hadj et Midelt. It started from Fez–Oujda line and ran south-west along the Moulouya River valley near the east bank of the river course. The whole railway line was: Guercif–Meski–Fritissa–Tissaf– Outat Oulad el Hadj. This section was completed and opened for military service during World War I in 1918.

The Outat Oulad el Hadj–Missour–Metlili–Midelt was completed in 1920. The total length of the line was 280 km, 33 km longer than Casablanca–Marrakesh main line.

There are several photographs showing trains and locomotives at Midelt railway station during the 1920s, and one official photograph with title " Midelt Gare " from 1920.

There were three limestone quarries around Midelt and later branch lines were built to the quarries, but little is known them because the whole line was closed by the end of 1935. (One other source give the closing date 05.07.1936.) This line served many French Foreign Legion Forts. There were also many colonial troops from West Africa, mainly from French Soudan. Many of the soldiers had taken their wives with them to Morocco and they settled to station settlements along this railway line such as Midelt, Missour and Outat Oulad el Hadj. The trains were packed with French officers, Foreign Legioners, Senegalese soldiers and their women, local tradesmen, even some " blue men ", the Tuaregs, French business men from Algeria and Morocco and French administrative personnel. Really a cosmopolitan society of travellers, really unique in railway world of narrow-gauge lines. When the line was opened in 1920 the Midelt railway station was still 12 km away from Midelt in an empty valley without any settlement around it. Only later it was extended near to old town of Midelt.

==== Gallery ====
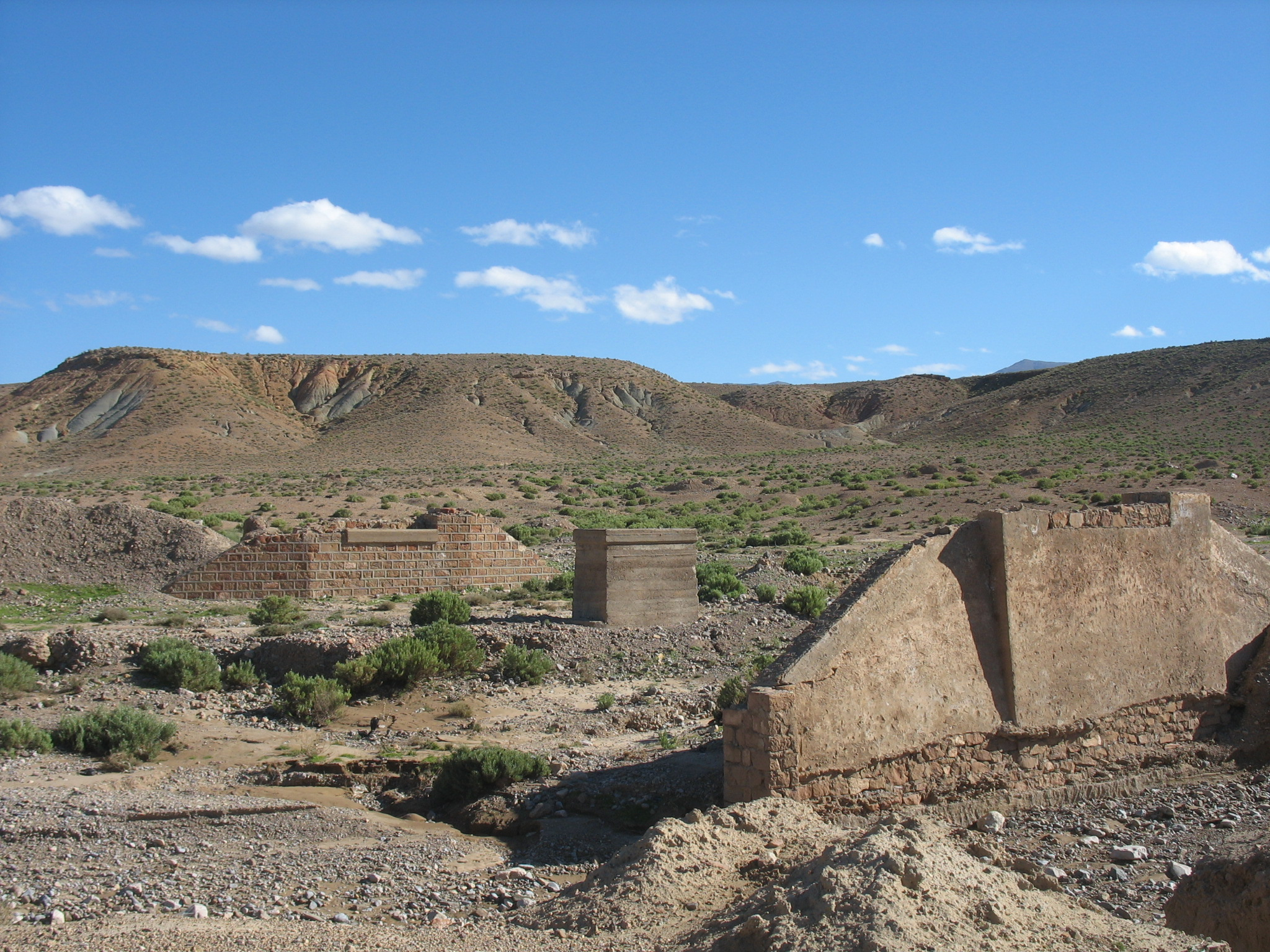
2-span bridge abutments near Midelt, with embankments totally washed away. 31-10-08

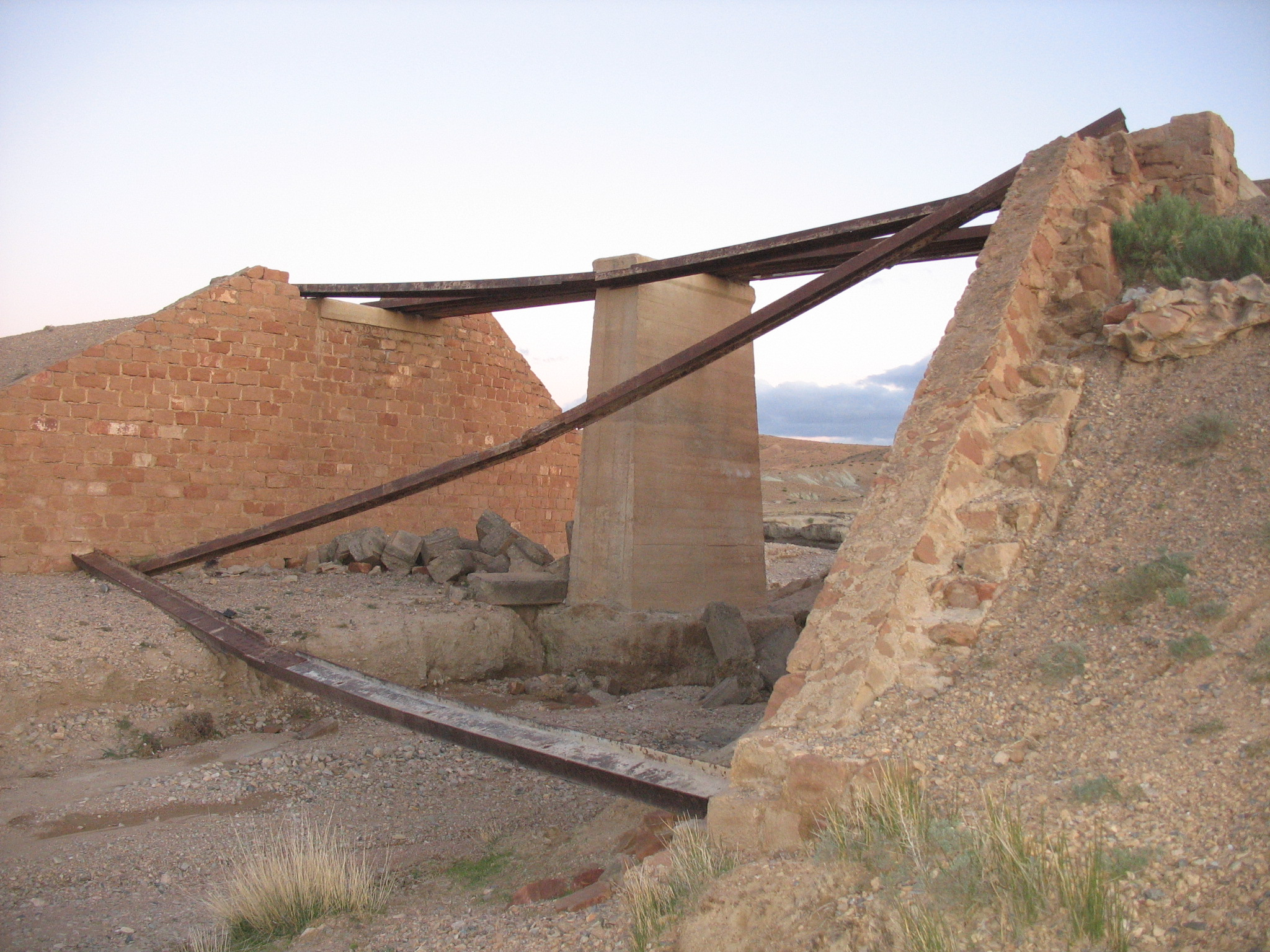
The remaining steel joists and abutments
of a bridge near
Midelt on the former
600 mm (1 ft 11 5/8 in) gauge railway.

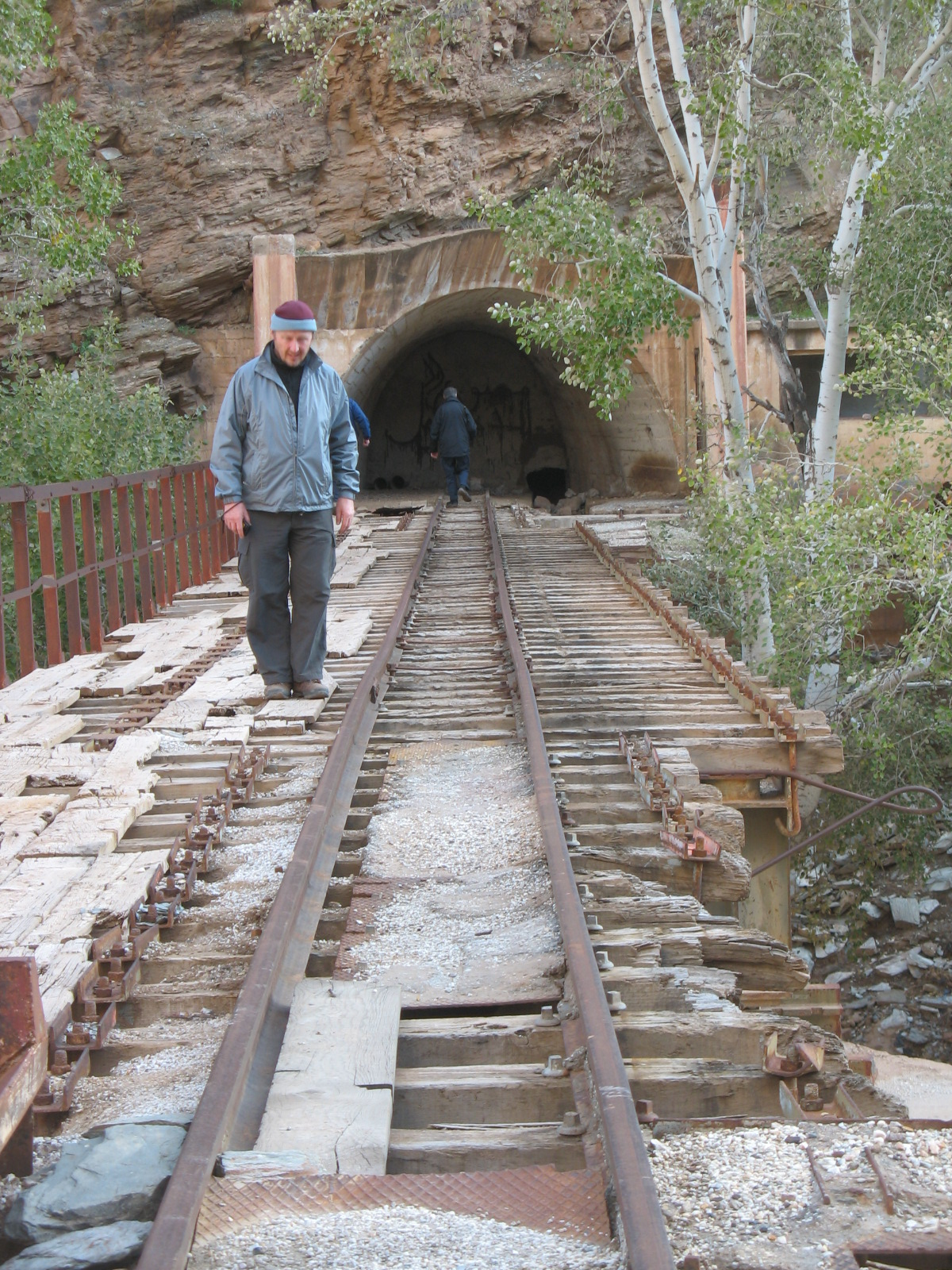
A rail bridge over the Oued Mouloula river, connecting mine entrances on opposite sides of the narrow valley at El Ahouli, to a discharge point.
4-11-08

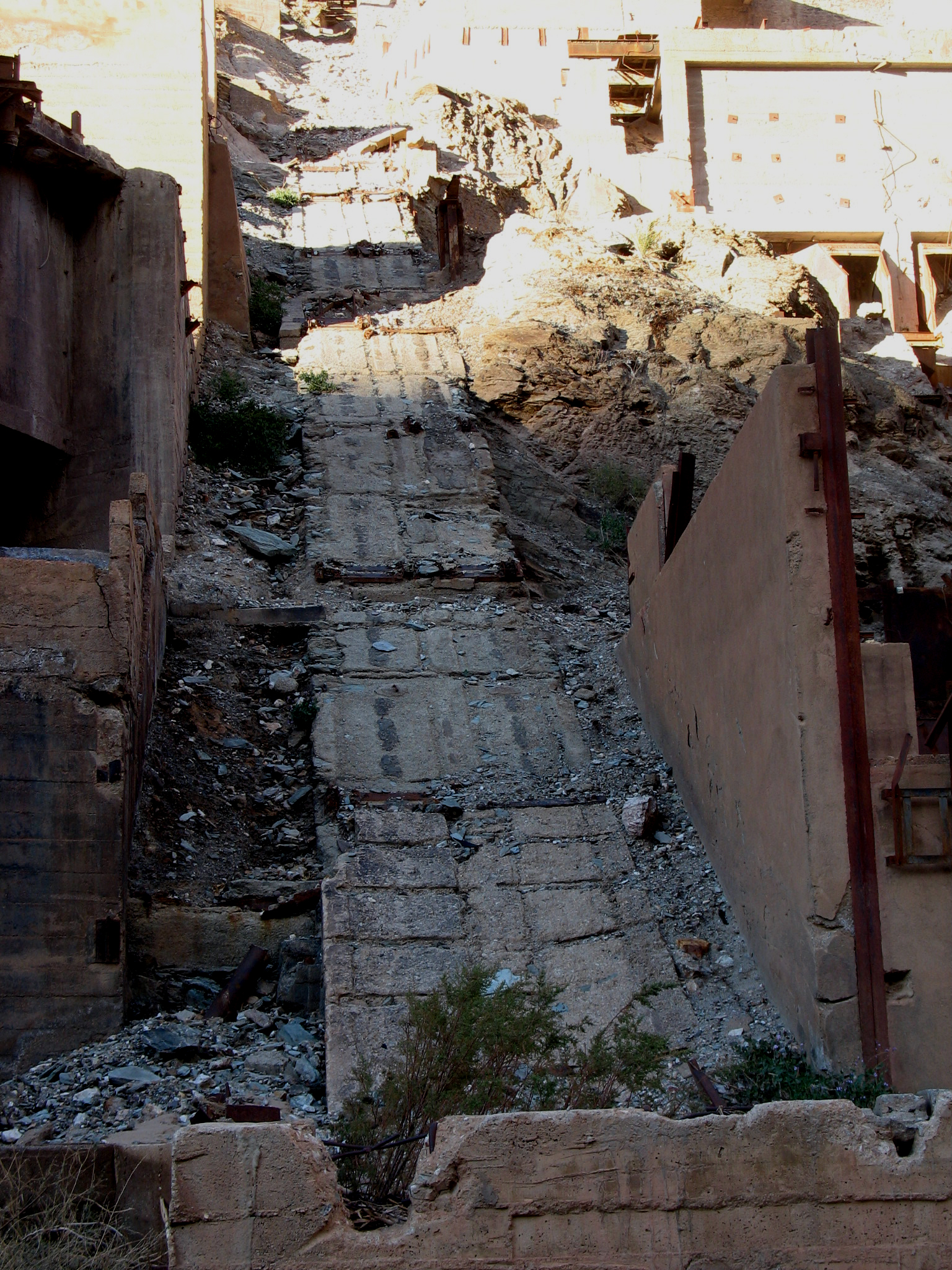
One of several former incline railways at El Ahouli silver-lead mines near Midelt, Morocco.
4-11-08

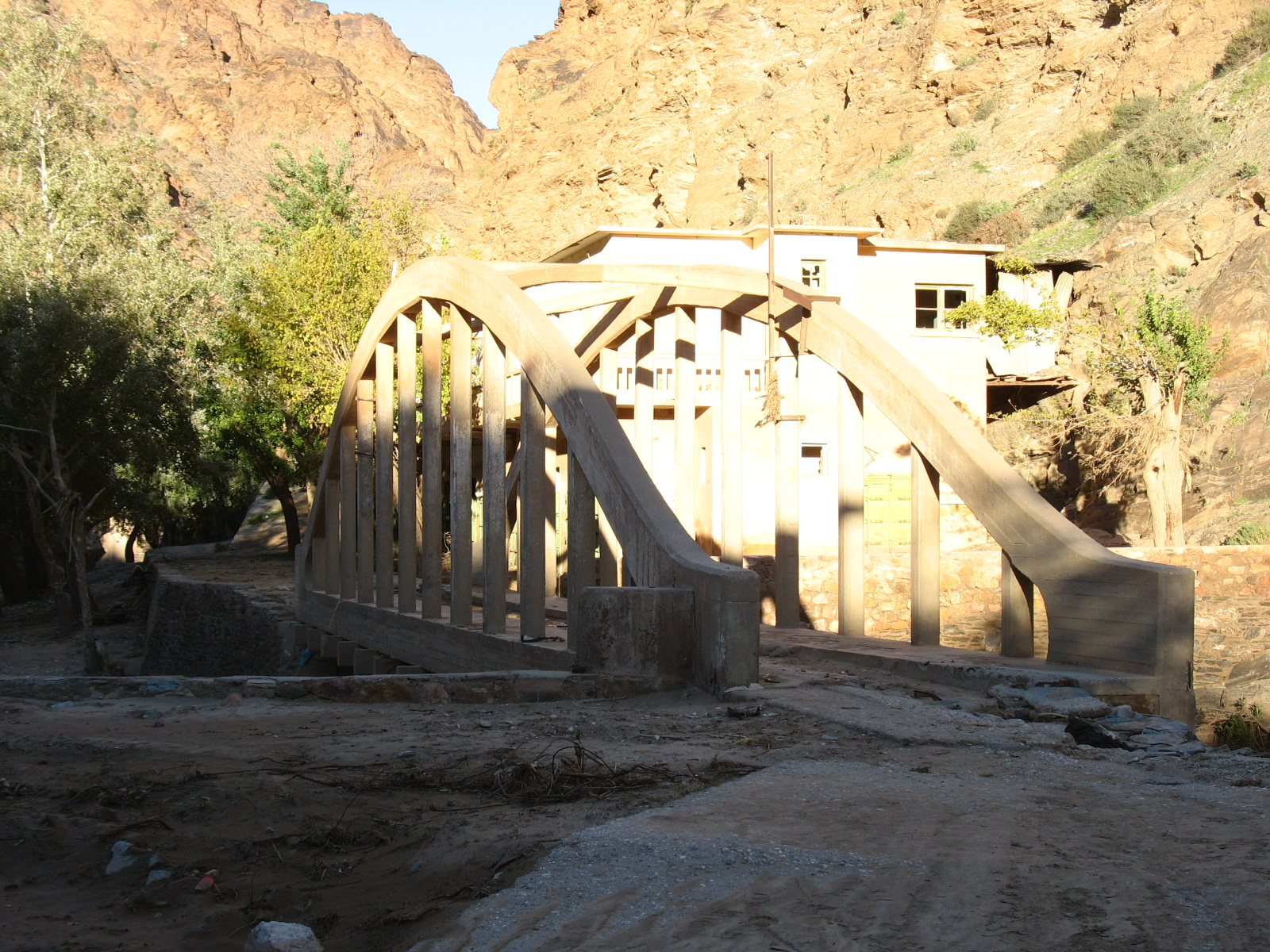
A bridge across the Oued Mouloula river on the former outlet tramway at El Ahouli silver-lead mines near Midelt, Morocco.
4-11-08

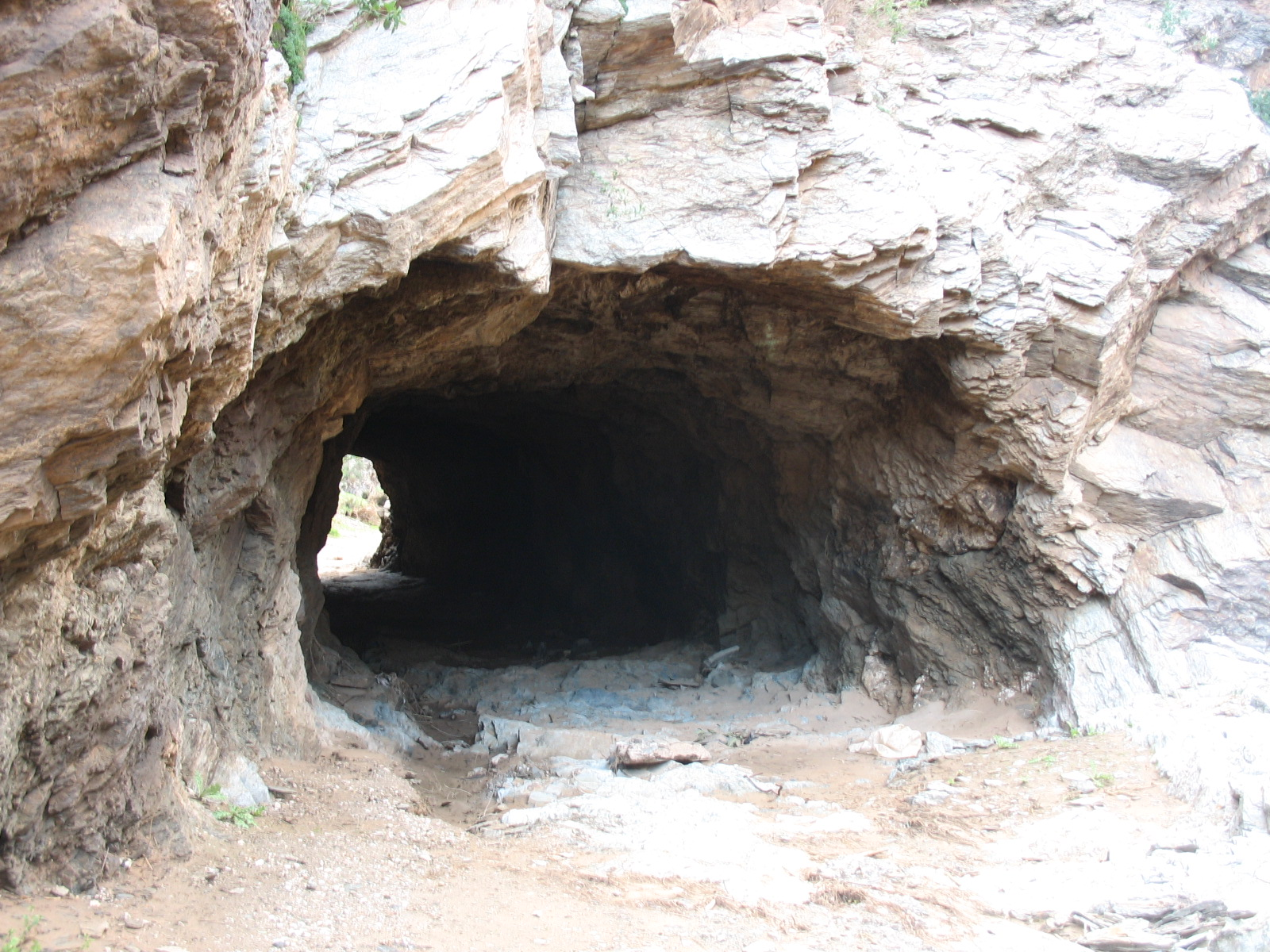
A short tunnel on the outlet tramway along the bank of the river at El Ahouli silver-lead mines near Midelt, Morocco.
4-11-08

== Others ==
=== Casablanca–Dar Bouazza ===
To provide better travelling facilities for local population in Casablanca area the French Gouvernement Cherifien helped to build a new 600 mm (1 ft 11 5/8 in) gauge line from Casablanca (Port) along the Atlantic coast to Dar Bouazza and turn toward at Bou Haj el Mehdi to Foucauld. This local line was opened in 1923 and it served at least up to 1953. In Casablanca the section from Boulevard d´Anfa to Casablanca railway station was replaced by a trolleybus line.

=== Agadir to Auone ===
Finally, there was in Morocco a little-known, totally isolated short 12 km 600 mm (1 ft 11 5/8 in) narrow-gauge line from Agadir to Auone. It was built after the Agadir Incident to strengthen the French military presence in Agadir. Nothing else is known of it. Remnants were still visible in the 1960s.

== Locomotives delivered to French Morocco for 600 mm gauge lines ==
Baldwin

- 5 Baldwin, 600 mm (1 ft 11 5/8 in), 2Ct-n2, built 1915, French Government f. Morocco No 101–106
- 20 Baldwin, 600 mm (1 ft 11 5/8 in), B-Bt-n4 type Pechot–Bourdon, built 1915–1916, French Army ( via Algeria )
- 5 Baldwin, 600 mm (1 ft 11 5/8 in), 2Ct-n2, built 1916, French Government f. Morocco No 107–111
- 5 Baldwin, 600 mm (1 ft 11 5/8 in), 2Ct-n2, built 1919, French High Commissar, Morocco No 112–116
- X Baldwin, 600 mm (1 ft 11 5/8 in), B-gasoline mechanical 50 hp (37 kW), built 1917–1918, used mainly on Guercif–Midelt 280 km line.

Borsig

- 1 Borsig, 600 mm (1 ft 11 5/8 in), Ct-n2, built 1910, Soc. Anon.d.Ateliers de Constr. de Hal f. Casablanca, Maroc
- 1 Borsig, 600 mm (1 ft 11 5/8 in), Ct-n2, built 1912, Soc. Anon.d.ateliers de Constr. de Hal f. Casablanca, Maroc

Crochat

- 5 Crochat, 600 mm (1 ft 11 5/8 in), 1915? BB type 14L60 (DL), built 1915, Comp. des Ch. de. fer. du Maroc Oriental

Decauville

- 2 Decauville, 600 mm (1 ft 11 5/8 in), C1t-n2, built 1910–1911, Péchot, Casablanca, Maroc
- 1 Decauville, 600 mm (1 ft 11 5/8 in), C1t-n2, built 1912, Consortium Marocain, Rabat
- 4 Decauville, 600 mm (1 ft 11 5/8 in), Ct-n2, built 1912, Ecole de Ch. de F. f. Ch. de Fer Militaires du Maroc
- 1 Decauville, 600 mm (1 ft 11 5/8 in), Ct-n2, built 1914, Gouvernement Cherifien, Maroc f.
- 1 Decauville, 600 mm (1 ft 11 5/8 in), Ct-n2, built 1917, Ecole de Ch. de F. f. Ch. de Fer Militaires du Maroc
- 6 Decauville, 600 mm (1 ft 11 5/8 in), Ct-n2, built 1915–1920, Ecole de Ch. de F. f. Ch. de Fer du Maroc Oriental
- 3 Decauville, 600 mm (1 ft 11 5/8 in), C´C-n4, built 1914–1916, Ecole de Ch. de F. f. Marnia–Taourirt, Maroc
- 27 Decauville, 600 mm (1 ft 11 5/8 in), C´C-n4, built 1917–1922, Ecole de Chemins de Fer f. Maroc No 6012–6017
- 8 Decauville, 600 mm (1 ft 11 5/8 in), 1C+C1-h4, built 1927–1928, Regie des Ch. de Fer f. Guercif–Midelt
- 1 Decauville, 600 mm (1 ft 11 5/8 in), 1C+C1-n4, built 1927, Regie des Ch. de Fer f. Guercif–Midelt

Jung

- 3 Jung, 600 mm (1 ft 11 5/8 in), Bt-n2, built 1911–1912 Consortium Marocain
- 1 Jung, 600 mm (1 ft 11 5/8 in), Bt-n2, built 1912, Leipziger & Co, f. Morocco

Orenstein & Koppel

- 1 Orenstein & Koppel, 600 mm (1 ft 11 5/8 in), Bt-n2, built 1909, Massanet, Marokko
- 2 Orenstein & Koppel, 600 mm (1 ft 11 5/8 in), Bt-n2, built 1913, Casablanca, Marokko
- 2 Orenstein & Koppel, 600 mm (1 ft 11 5/8 in), Ct-n2, built 1913, Schneider & Co, f. Marokko
- 1 Orenstein & Koppel, 600 mm (1 ft 11 5/8 in), Ct-n2, built 1913, Schneider & Co, f. Marokko
- 2 Orenstein & Koppel, 600 mm (1 ft 11 5/8 in), Ct-n2, built 1914, Perchot, Marokko f. CF Militaires

Schwartzkopff

- Schwartzkopff, 600 mm (1 ft 11 5/8 in), 1C+C1 petroleo–electrique Prototype, built 1931 Regie des. Chemins de Fer No 7000

Societe Alsacienne

- 12 Societe Alsacienne, 600 mm (1 ft 11 5/8 in), Et-n2, built 1921, C.F. Maroc

Weidknecht

- 5 Weidknecht, 600 mm (1 ft 11 5/8 in), 2Ct-n2, built 1912, C.F. Casablanca–Rabat
- 5 Weidknecht, 600 mm (1 ft 11 5/8 in), 2Ct-n2, built 1912, C.F. Marnia–Taourirt
- 19 Weidknecht, 600 mm (1 ft 11 5/8 in), 2Ct-n2, built 1913, Ch. de F. Militaires du Maroc

== See also ==
- Baldwin Class 10-12-D
- History of rail transport in Morocco
- Narrow-gauge railways in former Spanish Morocco
- War Department Light Railways
