= Ouazzane =

Town in Tanger-Tetouan-Al Hoceima, Morocco

Ouezzane وزان ⵡⴰⵣⵣⴰⵏ
- Town
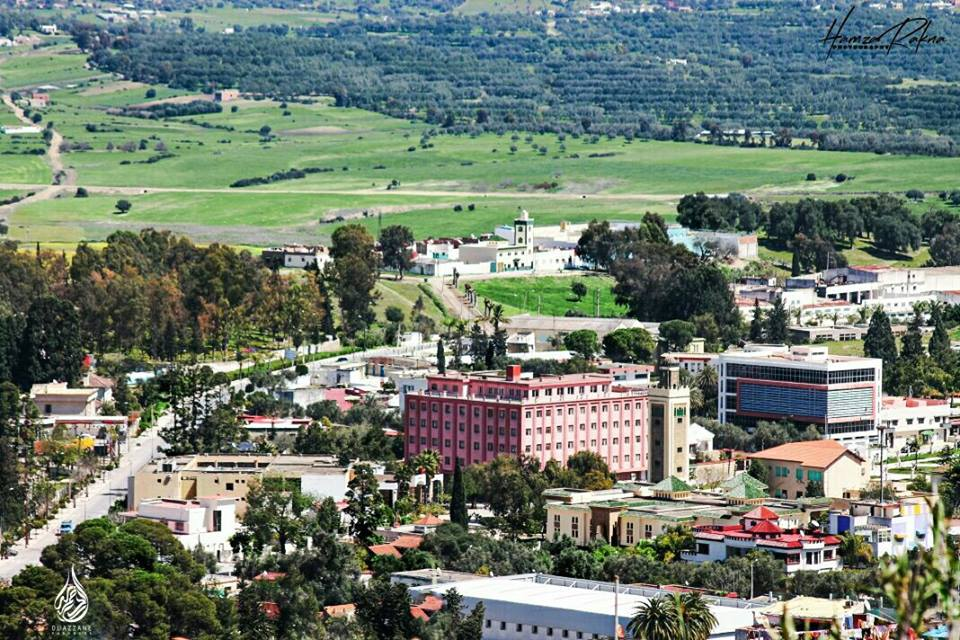
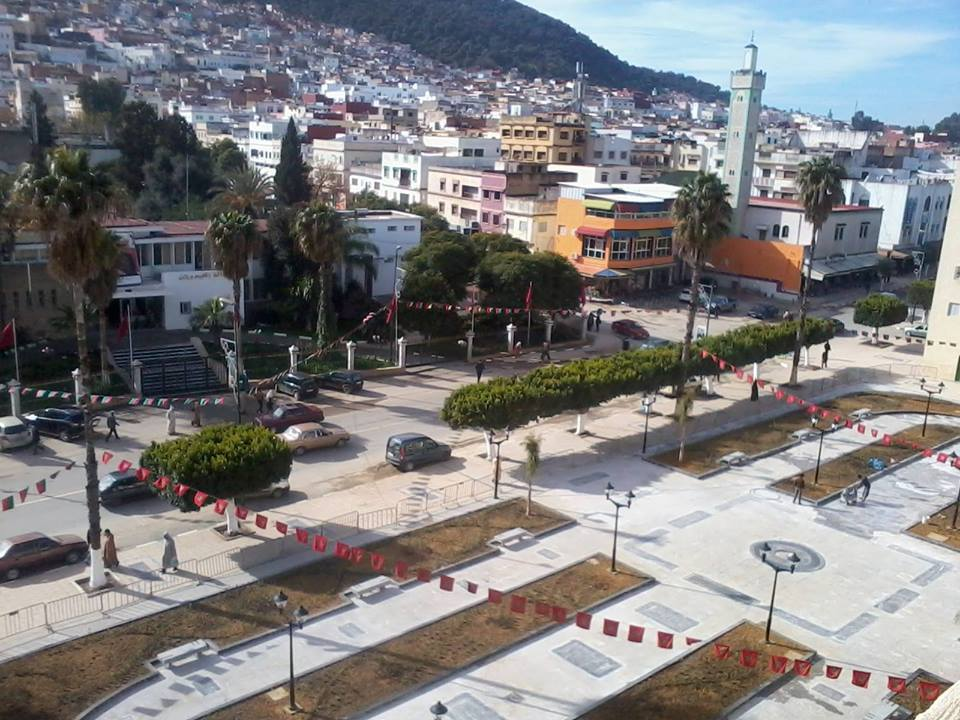
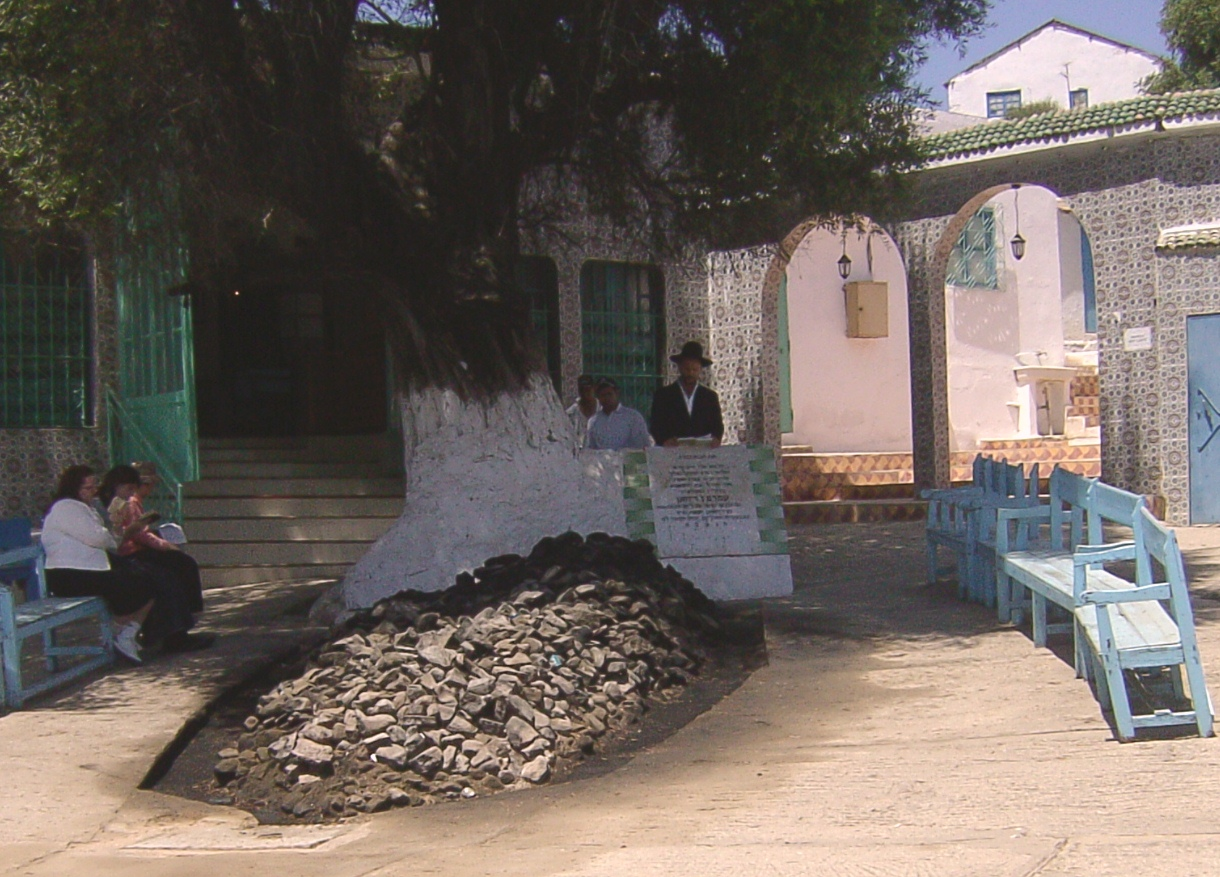
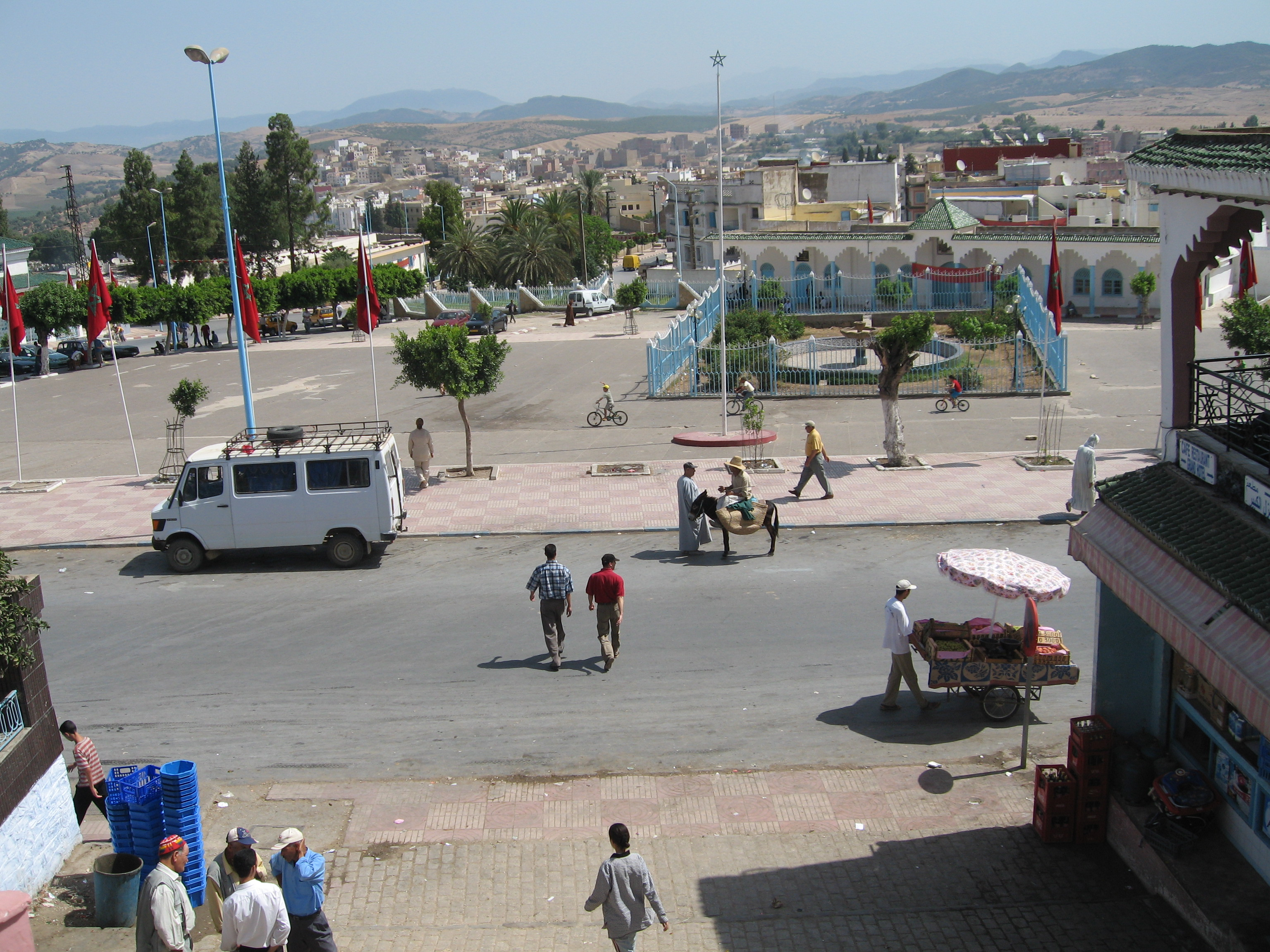
- Interactive map of Ouezzane
- Coordinates: 34°48′N 5°35′W
- Country: Morocco
- Region: Tanger-Tetouan-Al Hoceima
- Province: Ouezzane
- Elevation: 614 m (2,014 ft)

Population (2014)
  - Total: 59,606
- Time zone: UTC+0 (GMT)

Ouezzane (Arabic: وزان, romanized: Wazzān; Standard Moroccan Tamazight: ⵡⴰⵣⵣⴰⵏ) is a city in northern Morocco, with a population of 59,606 recorded in the 2014 Moroccan census.

The city is well known in Morocco and throughout the Islamic world as a spiritual capital, for it was home to several pillars of Sufism. It has also been known as "Dar Dmana" ("House of Safety") due to its containing the tomb of the 18th-century Idrisi Sharif.

Many Jews of Morocco consider Ouezzane to be a holy city and make pilgrimages there to venerate the tombs of several marabouts (Moroccan saints), particularly moul Anrhaz, the local name for Amram ben Diwan, an eighteenth-century rabbi. He lived in the city, and his burial site is associated with a number of miracles.

During the Rif rebellion (leader Abd el Krim) in 1925–1926, Ouezzane was an important supply base for the French Army. Ouezzane was connected by a 600 mm gauge narrow gauge railway via Ain Dfali, Mechra Bel Ksiri to Port Lyautey, now Kenitra, forming part of the 1912–1914 French-built extensive narrow gauge network of Chemins de fer Militaires du Maroc, the largest 600 mm gauge network that ever existed in Africa with a total length of more than 1702 kilometres.
