= Boulemane Province =

Province of Morocco

Coordinates: 33°03′00″N 3°59′27″W

Boulemane Province إقليم بولمان ⵜⴰⵙⴳⴰ ⵏ ⴱⵓⵍⵎⴰⵏ
- Province
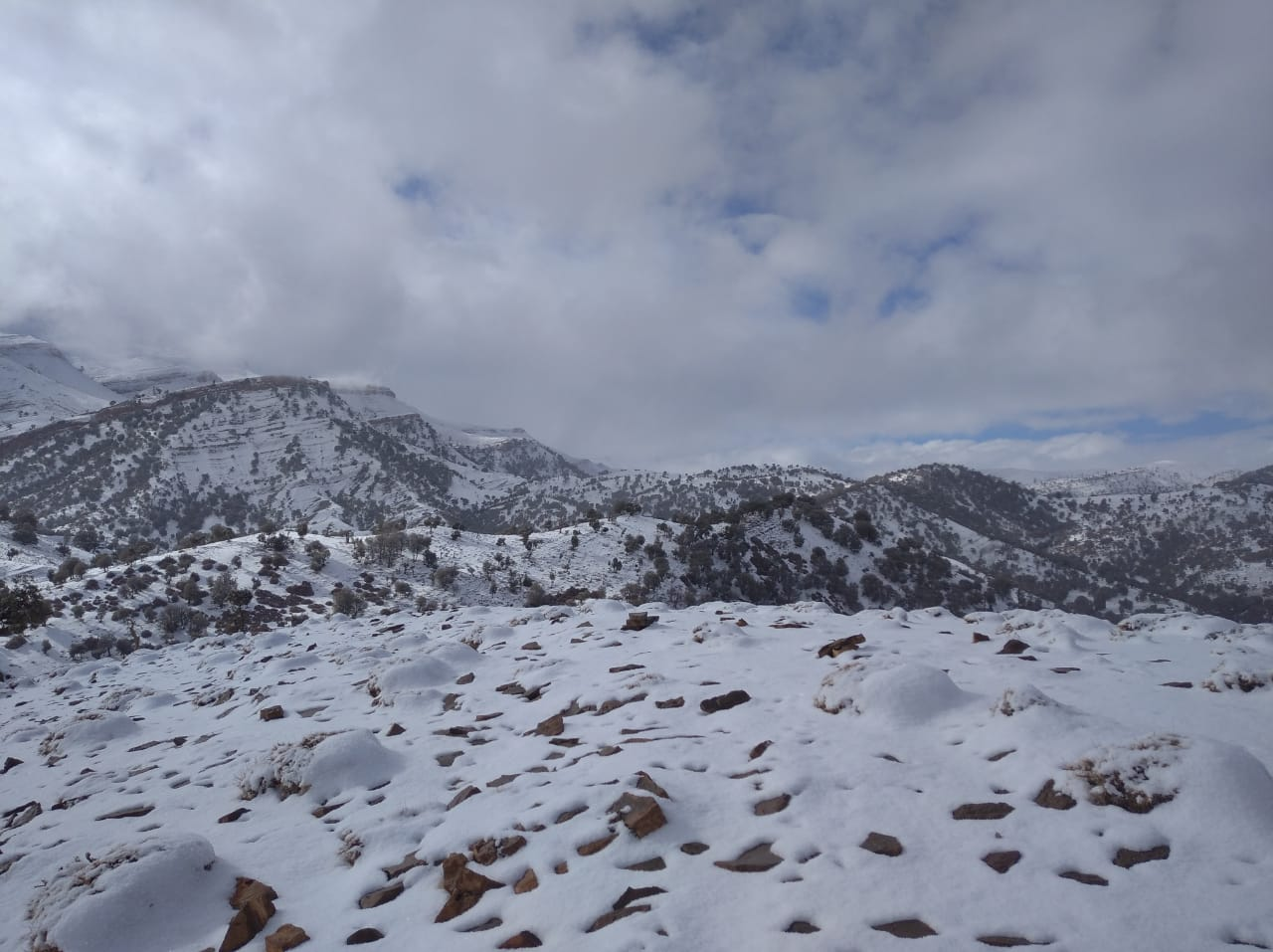
- view of Skoura M'Daz from the Tadout falls Sebou (Guigou) river sources Imouzzer Marmoucha in winter
- Interactive map of Boulemane Province
- Country: Morocco
- Region: Fès-Meknès
- Seat: Missour

Population (2024)
  - Total: 205,411

Boulemane Province (بولمان; ⴱⵓⵍⵎⴰⵏ) is a province in northern Morocco, located within the Fès-Meknès region. It is largely rural in character, the province is named after the town of Boulemane but its administrative seat and biggest city is Missour.

The major cities are:

- Missour
- Outat El Haj
- Guigou

== Geography ==
The province lies on the eastern edge of the Middle Atlas, extending toward the high plateaus of eastern Morocco. Its landscape is shaped by mountainous terrain, open plateaus, and semi-arid zones. Elevation varies significantly across the province, with upland areas supporting seasonal agriculture and grazing.

Water resources are limited and unevenly distributed, influencing settlement patterns and agricultural practices. Rural communities are dispersed, often organized around small valleys or plateau zones.

== Economy ==
The local economy is primarily based on agriculture and pastoralism. Livestock raising, particularly sheep and goats, plays an important role in rural livelihoods. Crop production is generally adapted to climatic constraints and includes cereals and other dryland crops.

Economic activity outside agriculture remains limited, with small-scale trade and services concentrated in the main towns.

== Subdivisions ==
Communes of Boulemane Province

Boulemane Province is divided into a number of municipalities and rural communes organized within administrative circles. These intermediate units oversee local governance and territorial management.

The main urban municipalities include Boulemane, Missour, Outat El Haj, and Imouzzer Marmoucha, which serve as administrative and service centers for surrounding rural areas.

The province is divided administratively into the following:

Name	Geographic code	Type	Households	Population (2004)	Foreign population	Moroccan population	Notes
Boulemane	131.01.01.	Municipality	1541	6910	1	6909	
Imouzzer Marmoucha	131.01.02.	Municipality	908	4001	1	4000	
Missour	131.01.03.	Municipality	4286	20978	28	20950	
Outat El Haj	131.01.05.	Municipality	2625	13945	5	13940	
Ait Bazza	131.03.01.	Rural commune	612	3480	0	3480	
Ait El Mane	131.03.03.	Rural commune	440	2243	0	2243	
Almis Marmoucha	131.03.05.	Rural commune	445	2698	0	2698	
El Mers	131.03.07.	Rural commune	1178	5891	1	5890	
Enjil	131.03.09.	Rural commune	1534	8164	0	8164	
Guigou	131.03.11.	Rural commune	3694	19035	1	19034	7976 residents live in the center, called Guigou; 11059 residents live in rural areas.
Serghina	131.03.13.	Rural commune	733	3726	0	3726	
Skoura M'Daz	131.03.15.	Rural commune	1934	8713	1	8712	
Talzemt	131.03.17.	Rural commune	650	3710	0	3710	
Ksabi Moulouya	131.05.01.	Rural commune	1759	10067	1	10066	
Ouizeght	131.05.03.	Rural commune	963	5509	0	5509	
Sidi Boutayeb	131.05.05.	Rural commune	1705	9522	20	9502	
El Orjane	131.07.01.	Rural commune	1179	7609	2	7607	
Ermila	131.07.03.	Rural commune	1079	6774	0	6774	
Fritissa	131.07.05.	Rural commune	3314	26022	5	26017	
Oulad Ali Youssef	131.07.07.	Rural commune	1074	6669	0	6669	
Tissaf	131.07.09.	Rural commune	1455	9444	2	9442	

== Infrastructure ==
In 2019, the Moroccan government and German development bank KFW announced that Boulemane will be one of seven regions to construct a solar energy plant as part of the country's larger goal to increase renewable energy production.
