= Boulemane =

Boulemane بولمان ⴱⵓⵍⵎⴰⵏ
- Town
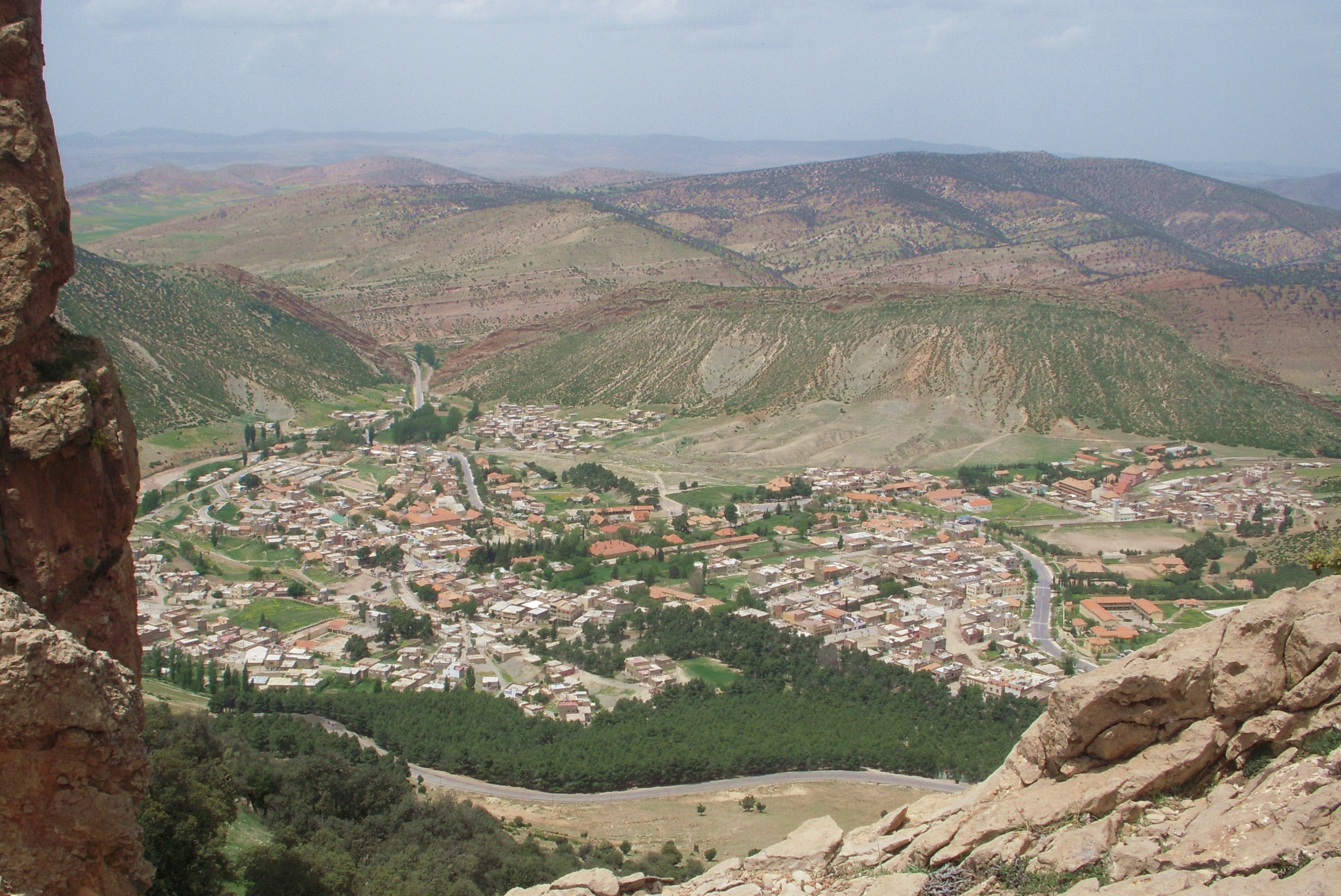
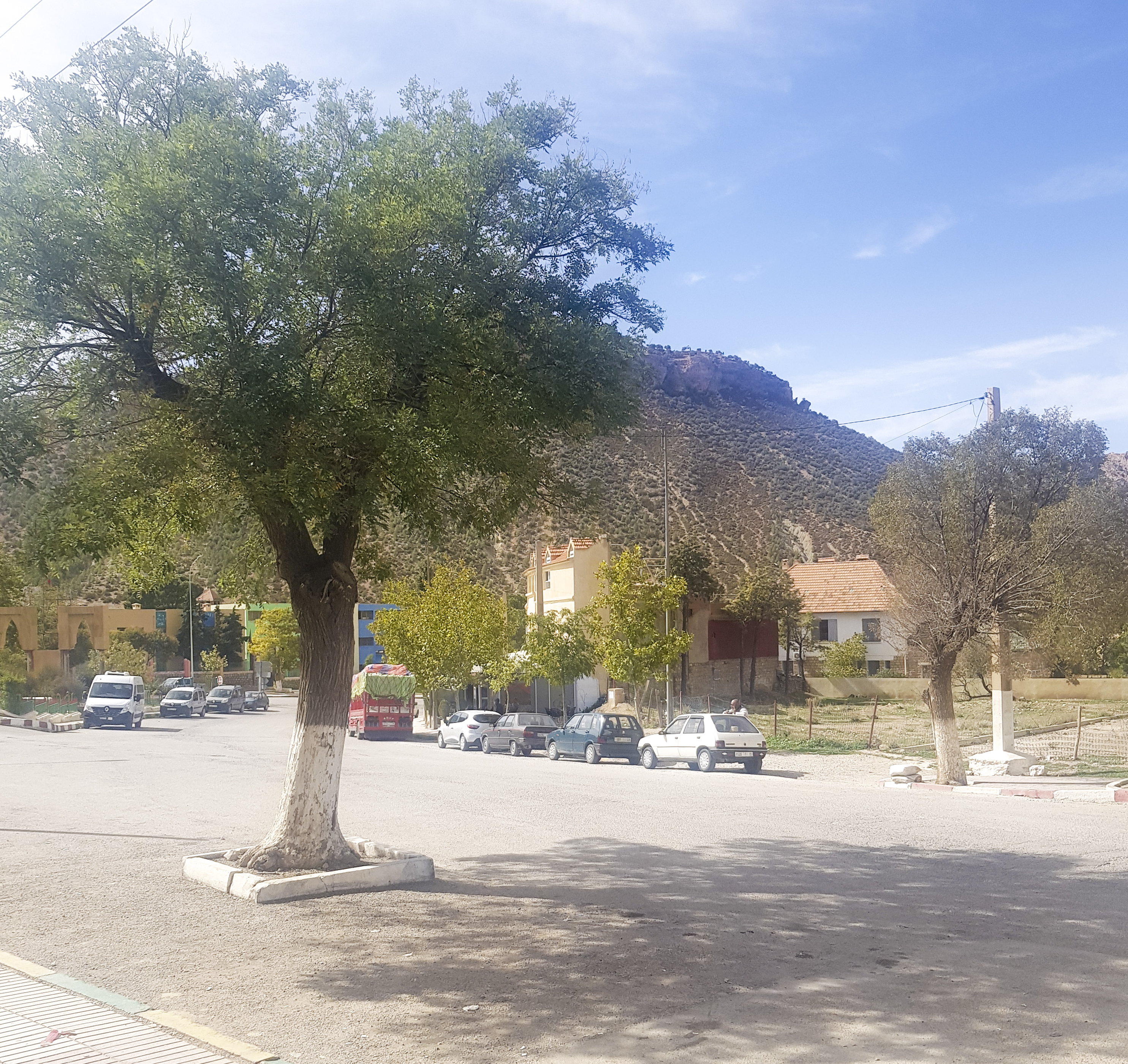
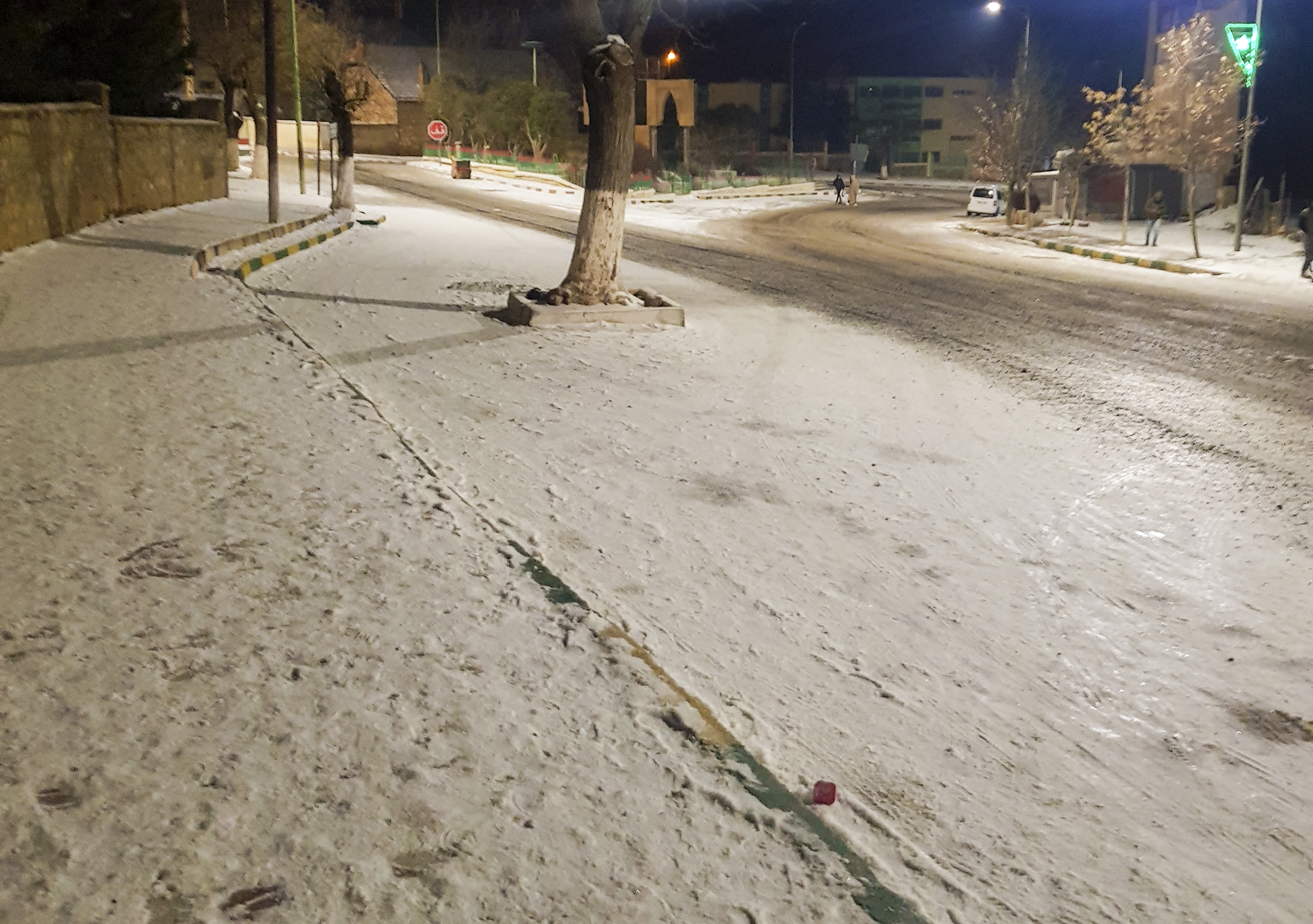
- Interactive map of Boulemane
- Coordinates: 33°21′50″N 4°43′48″W
- Country: Morocco
- Region: Fez-Meknes
- Province: Boulemane
- Elevation: 5,740 ft (1,750 m)

Population (2008)
  - Total: 6,910
- Time zone: UTC+0 (GMT)

Boulemane (Arabic: بولمان; Standard Moroccan Tamazight: ⴱⵓⵍⵎⴰⵏ) is a scenic small town in the Middle Atlas mountains in Boulemane Province, Fez-Meknes, Morocco.

It is the highest city in Morocco, sitting at an altitude of 1750 metres, making it relatively cool year round. The town is located 102 kilometers from the city of Fez.

According to the 2004 census, its population exceeded 6,910 inhabitants.

The town is famous for its natural beauty and tourist attractions, featuring numerous rivers, rugged mountains, oak forests, rice fields, orchards, and olive groves. The surrounding area is rich in agricultural land, with extensive fields dedicated to fruits and vegetables as well as corn and various other crops.

The region is home to diverse wildlife, including lizards, wild boars, and many other animal species.
