= Sidi Boutayeb =

Sidi Boutayeb سيدي بوطيب
- Rural commune and town
- Location within Morocco
- Coordinates: 33.0262°N 4.0324°W
- Country: Morocco
- Region: Fès-Meknès
- Province: Boulemane Province

Population (2004)
  - Total: 9,522
- Time zone: UTC+0 (GMT)

Sidi Boutayeb is a small town and rural commune in Boulemane Province of the Fès-Meknès region of Morocco. At the time of the 2004 census, the commune had a total population of 9522 in 1705 households.
