= El Mers =

- Rural commune and town
- Location within Morocco
- Coordinates: 33.4449°N 4.4481°W
- Country: Morocco
- Region: Fès-Meknès
- Province: Boulemane Province

Population (2004)
  - Total: 5,891
- Time zone: UTC+0 (GMT)

El Mers is a small town and rural commune in Boulemane Province of the Fès-Meknès region of Morocco. At the time of the 2004 census, the commune had a total population of 5,891 people living in 1,178 households.
