= Enjil, Morocco =

Enjil
- Rural commune and town
- Location within Morocco
- Coordinates: 33°11′N 4°33′W
- Country: Morocco
- Region: Fès-Meknès
- Province: Boulemane Province

Population (2004)
  - Total: 8,164
- Time zone: UTC+0 (GMT)

Enjil is a small town and rural commune in Boulemane Province of the Fès-Meknès region of Morocco. At the time of the 2004 census, the commune had a total population of 8164 people living in 1534 households.
