= Talzemt =

- Rural commune and town
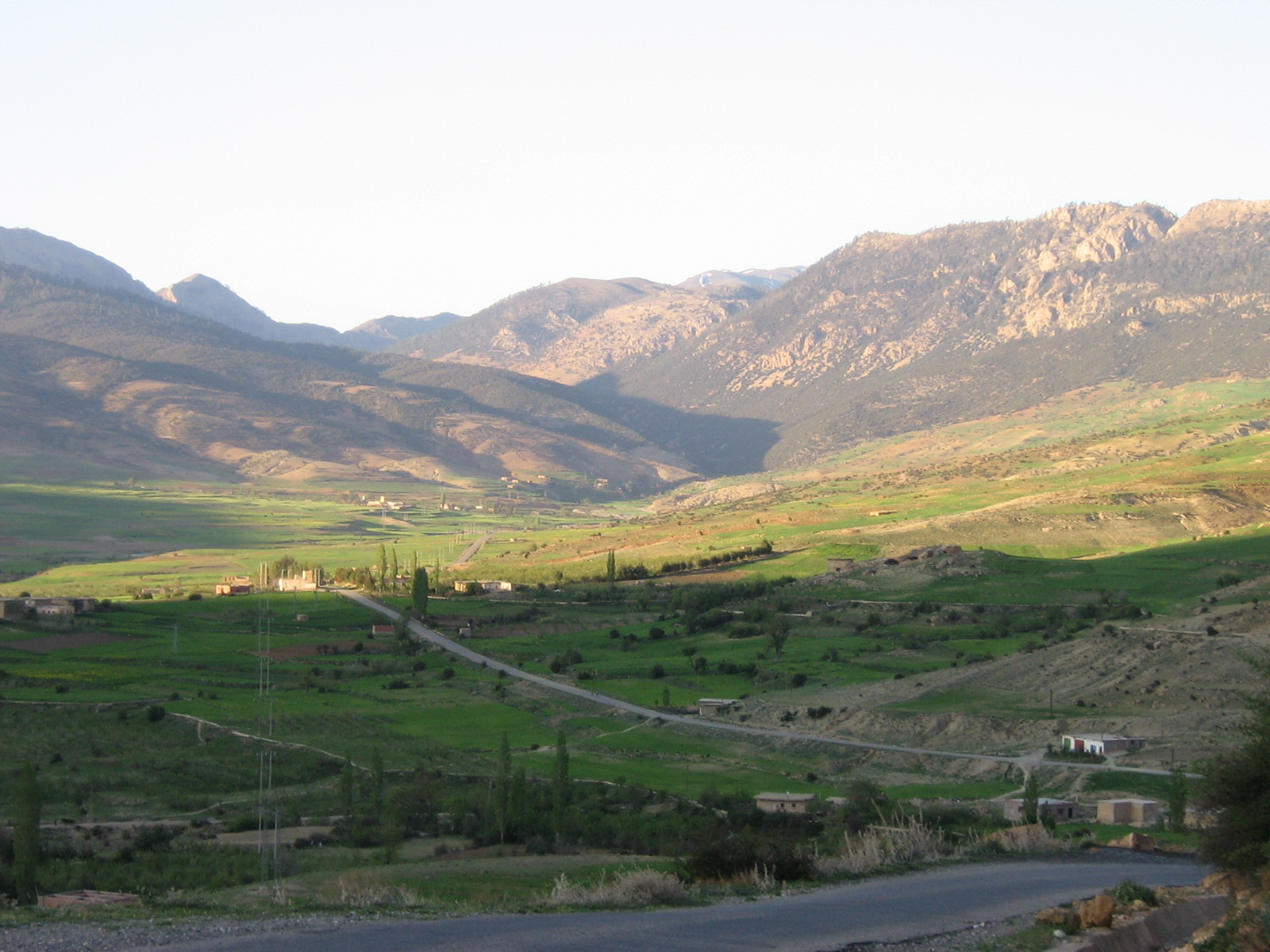

- Location within Morocco
- Country: Morocco
- Region: Fès-Meknès
- Province: Boulemane Province

Population (2004)
  - Total: 3,710
- Time zone: UTC+0 (GMT)

Talzemt is a small town and rural commune in Boulemane Province of the Fès-Meknès region of Morocco. At the time of the 2004 census, the commune had a total population of 3710 people living in 650 households.
