= Ksabi Moulouya =

- Rural commune and town
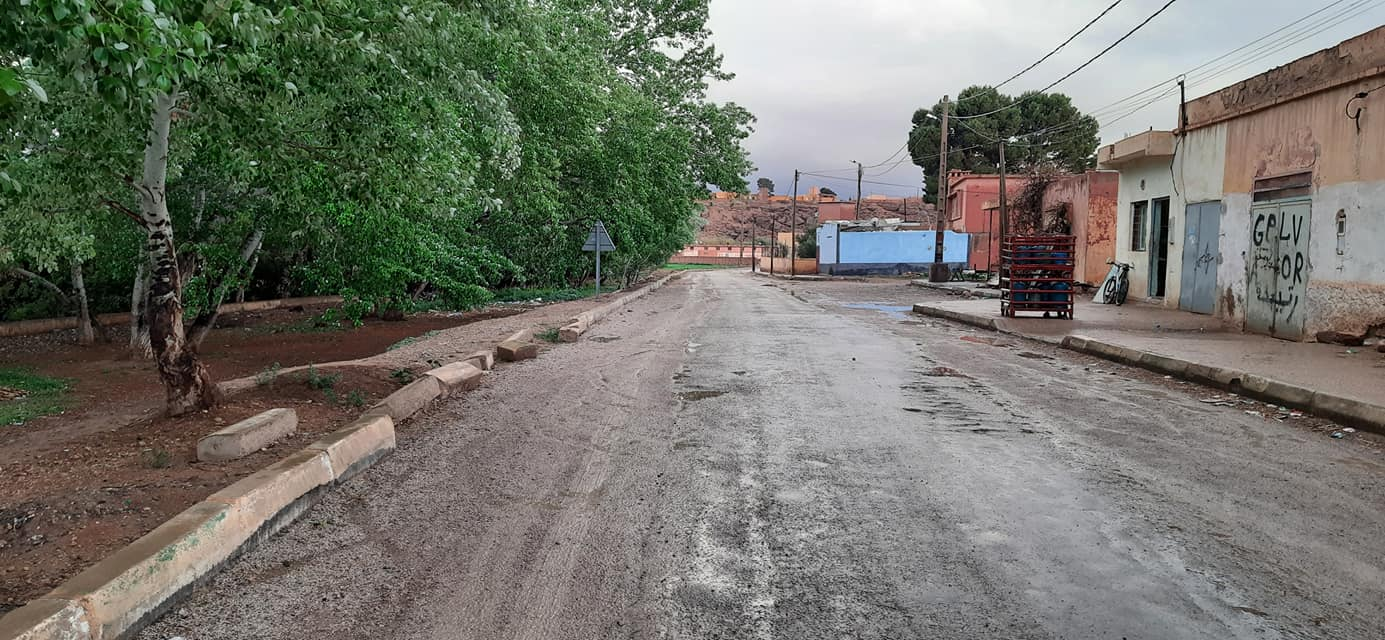
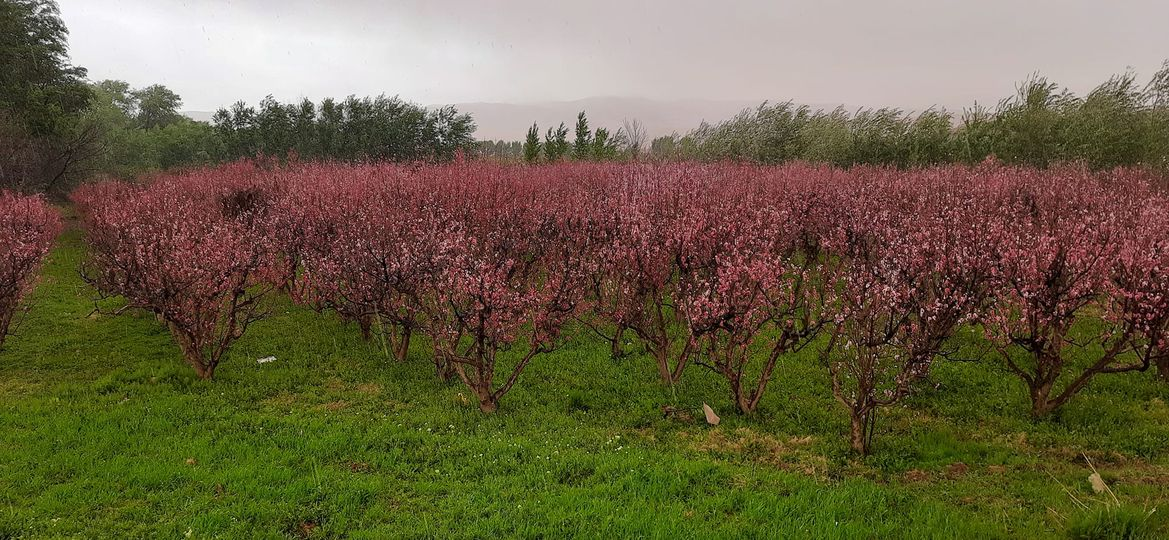
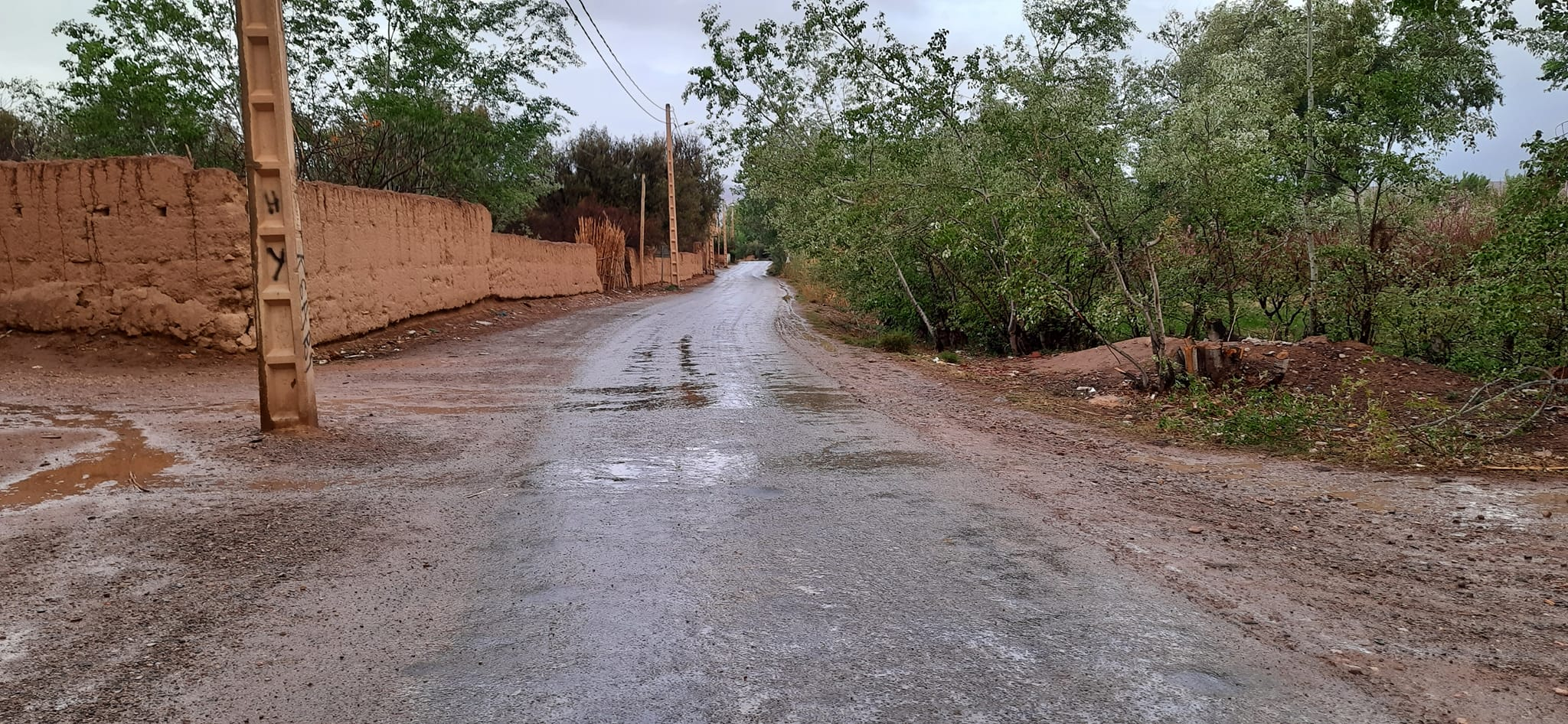

- Location within Morocco
- Coordinates: 32.8317°N 4.4018°W
- Country: Morocco
- Region: Fès-Meknès
- Province: Boulemane Province

Population (2004)
  - Total: 10,067
- Time zone: UTC+0 (GMT)

Ksabi Moulouya is a small town and rural commune in Boulemane Province of the Fès-Meknès region of Morocco. At the time of the 2004 census, the commune had a total population of 10067 people living in 1759 households.
