= Imouzzer Marmoucha =

Coordinates: 33°28′N 4°17′W

Imouzzer Marmoucha إیموزار مرموشة
- Town
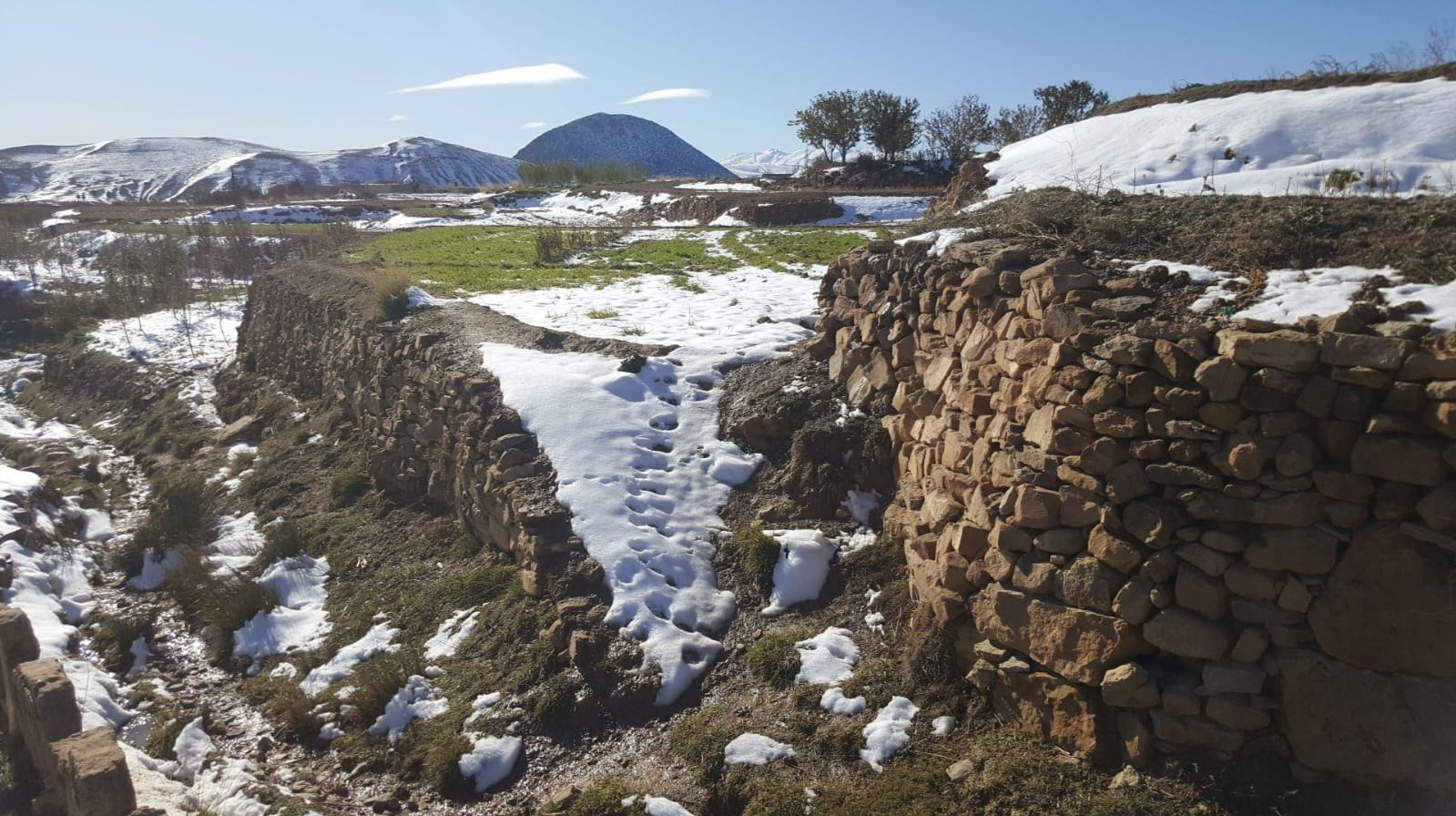
- Interactive map of Imouzzer Marmoucha
- Country: Morocco
- Region: Fès-Meknès
- Province: Boulemane
- Elevation: 5,620 ft (1,713 m)

Population (2004)
  - Total: 4,001
- Time zone: UTC+0 (GMT)

Imouzzer Marmoucha (Arabic: إیموزار مرموشة) is a town in Boulemane Province, Fès-Meknès, Morocco. According to the 2004 census it has a population of 4,001.
