= Almis Marmoucha =

- Rural commune and town
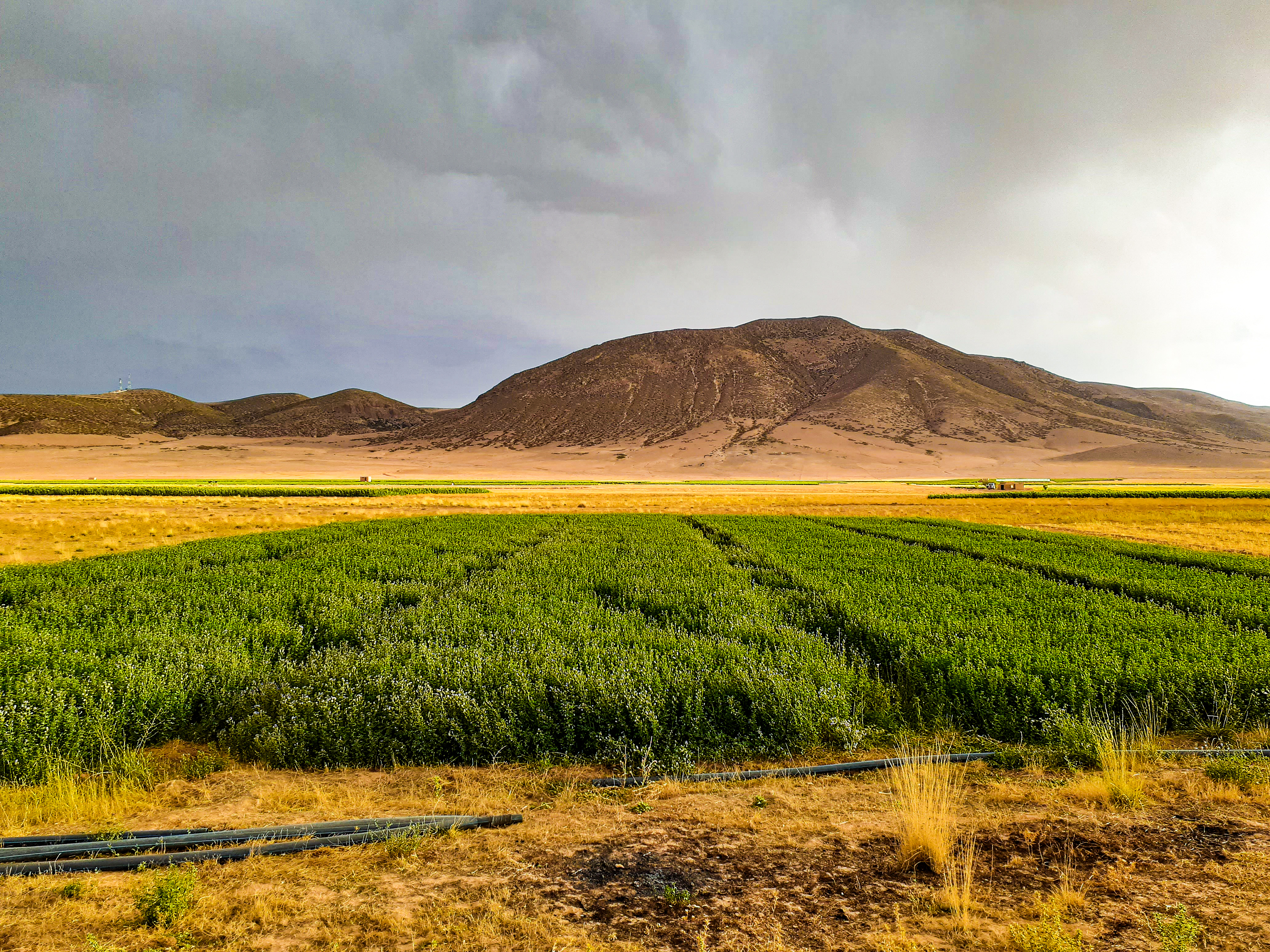
- Tafdna mountain
- Interactive map of Almis Marmoucha
- Coordinates: 33°19′N 4°11′W
- Country: Morocco
- Region: Fès-Meknès
- Province: Boulemane Province

Population (2004)
  - Total: 2,698
- Time zone: UTC+0 (GMT)

Almis Marmoucha is a small town and rural commune in Boulemane Province of the Fès-Meknès region of Morocco. At the time of the 2004 census, the commune had a total population of 2698 people living in 445 households.
