= Skoura M'Daz =

Skoura M'Daz سكورة مداز ⵙⴽⴽⵓⵔⴰ ⵎⴷⴰⵣ
- Rural commune and town
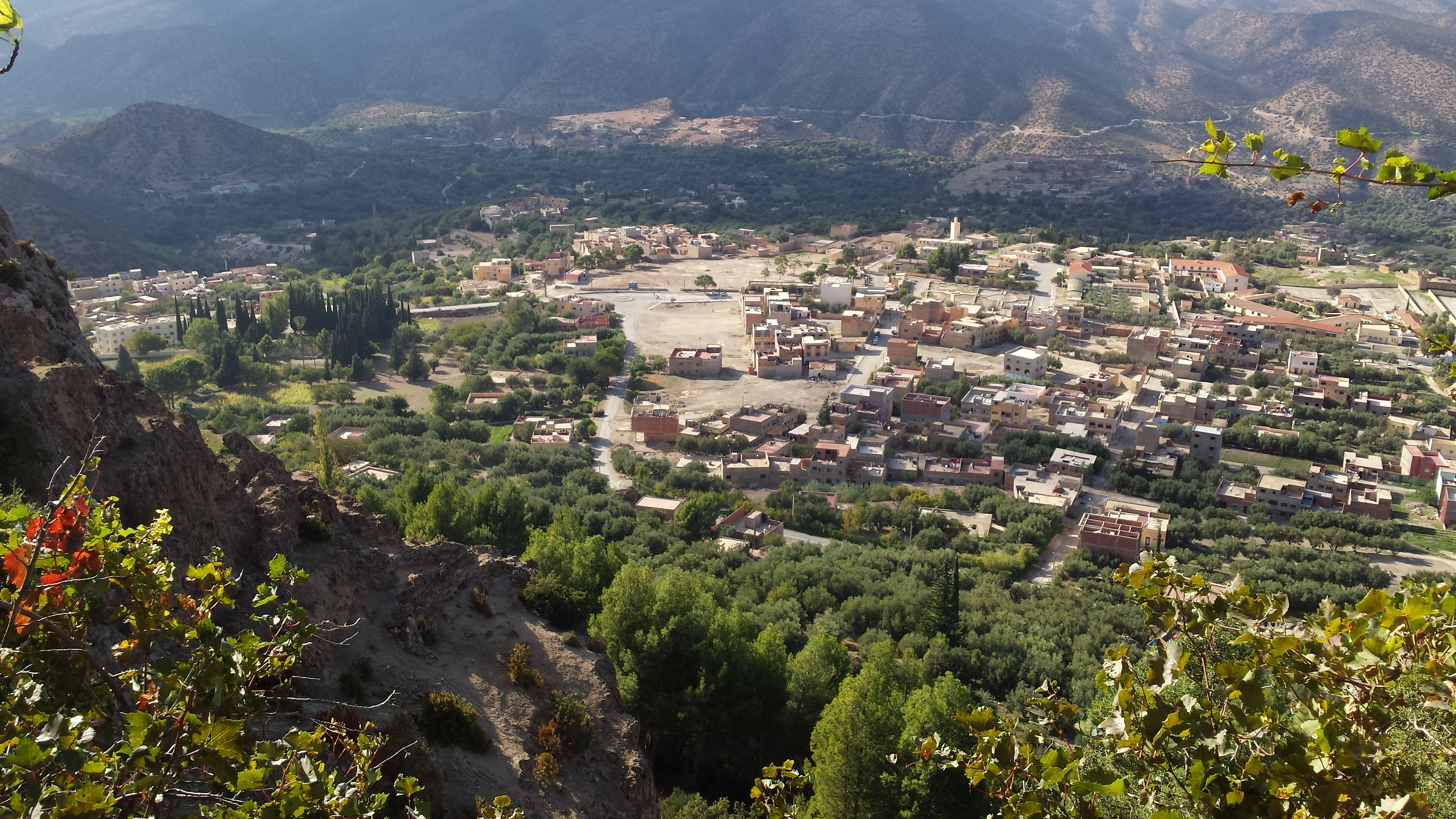
- Interactive map of Skoura M'Daz
- Country: Morocco
- Region: Fès-Meknès
- Province: Boulemane Province

Area
  - Total: 475 km^{2} (183 sq mi)

Population (2004)
  - Total: 8,713
- Time zone: UTC+0 (GMT)

Skoura M'Daz is a small town and rural commune in Boulemane Province of the Fès-Meknès region of Morocco. At the time of the 2004 census, the commune had a total population of 8713 people living in 1934 households.

== Commune Places ==
- Aït Hamou Yahya
- Aït Wahyan
- Aman Ilila
- Bouassem
- Ichen Aaki
- L'hersh
- Sidi Mehyo
- Tadout
- Taghrout
- Tajjin
- Tikhzanin
- Tizi l'Qlib
- (...)
