= Guigou =

Guigou is a surname, and may refer to:

- Élisabeth Guigou (born 1946), French politician
- Gianni Guigou (born 1975), Uruguayan footballer
- Michaël Guigou (born 1982), French handball player
- Paul Guigou (1834–1871), French painter

Guigou may also refer to:

- Guigou, Morocco
