= Crochat =

French railway equipment construction company

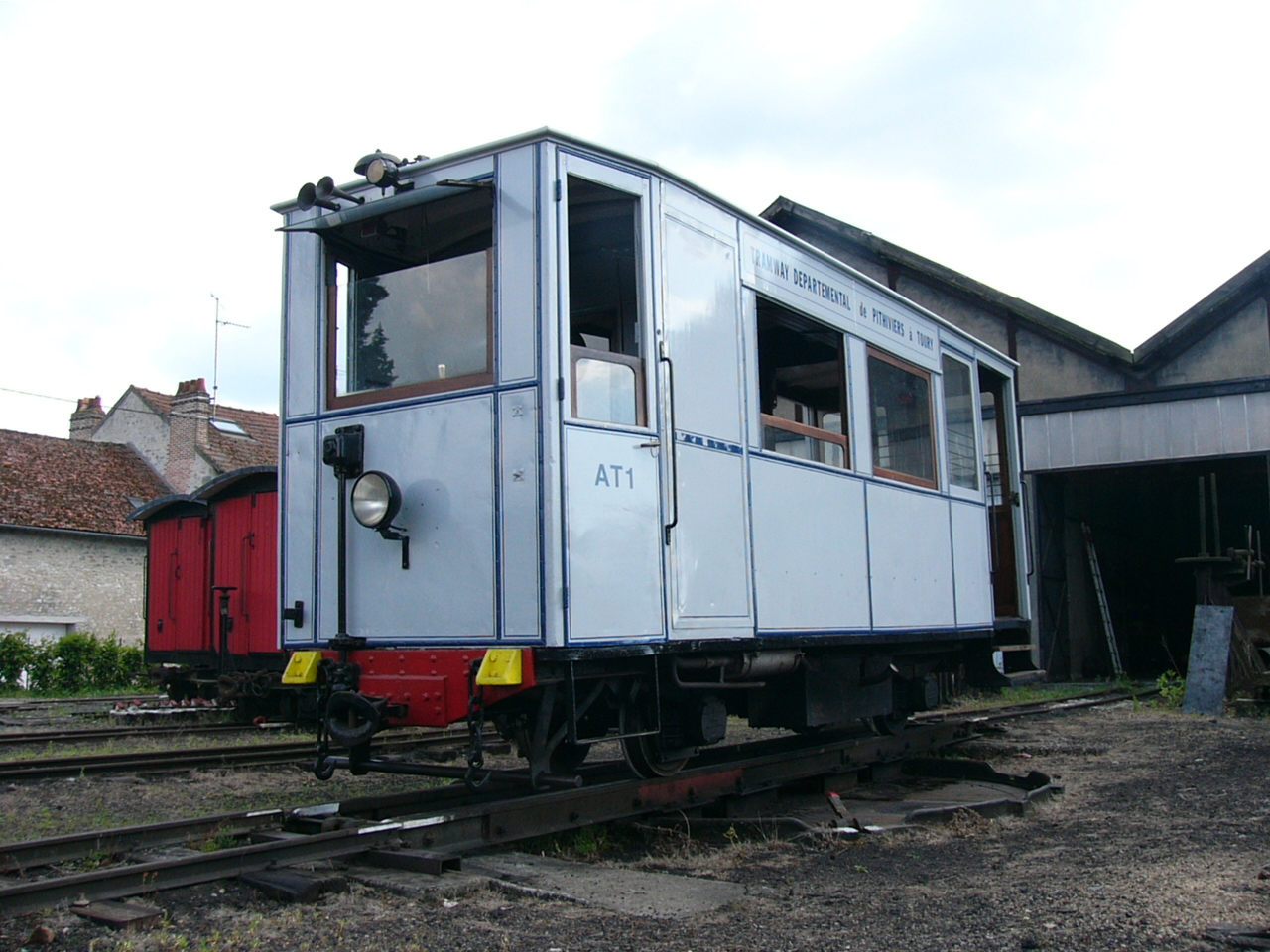
Crochat petrol electric railcar preserved at Pithiviers

Crochat was a French railway equipment construction company founded in 1899 by Henry Crochat. It is best known for building locomotives and railcars with petrol-electric transmission.

== History ==
- 1899 - Company founded by Henry Crochat
- 1908 to 1918 - Construction of 420 petrol-electric locomotives for le Ministère de la Guerre (Ministry of War) and a small number for other customers. See table below for details
- 1924 - Acquisition of patents by Decauville
- 1926 - Foundation of Société Auxiliaire d'Entreprise (SAE) by Henry Crochat
- 1928 - Company liquidated

== Locomotive types ==
Petrol-electric locomotive types

This is not a complete list.

| Type | Weight | Axles | Gauge | Number built | Customer |
|---|---|---|---|---|---|
| 14 L 4 60 | 14 tonnes | 4 | 600 mm | 200; 5; 10 | le Ministère de la Guerre la Compagnie des Chemins de Fer du Maroc Oriental les chantiers de l'entreprise Collet, Rabat/Maroc |
| 22 L 2 N | 22 tonnes | 2 | 1435 mm | 130; 38; 2 | le Ministère de la Guerre la Compagnie des Chemins de Fer du Nord la Compagnie du Gaz de Paris |
| 44 L 4 N | 44 tonnes | 4 | 1435 mm | 90; 40 | le Ministère de la Guerre la Compagnie des Chemins de Fer du Nord |
| ? | ? | 6 | 500 mm | 19 | les Salins du Midi |

== Crochat and Colardeau ==
Henry Crochat obtained some patents jointly with Emmanuel Colardeau, e.g. patent US1416611. There is no evidence that Colardeau was involved in Crochat's railway business but he may have been involved, with Crochat, in the design of the Saint-Chamond (tank).

== Equipment preserved ==
- Crochat AT1 petrol-electric railcar (1922) from Tramway de Pithiviers à Toury preserved at Musée des transports de Pithiviers
- Five Crochat 6-axle locomotives of 1918 (ex Salins du Midi) preserved at Chemin de fer touristique du Tarn. One of these is a historical monument
- Decauville-Crochat AT3 petrol-electric railcar (1926) preserved at Le p'tit train de Saint-Trojan
- Crochat standard gauge locomotive 44 L 4 N preserved at the Museum of Engineering in Angers (not on public view)
