= Amram ben Diwan =

18th-century rabbi and venerated figure

- עַמְרָם בֶּן דִיוָואן
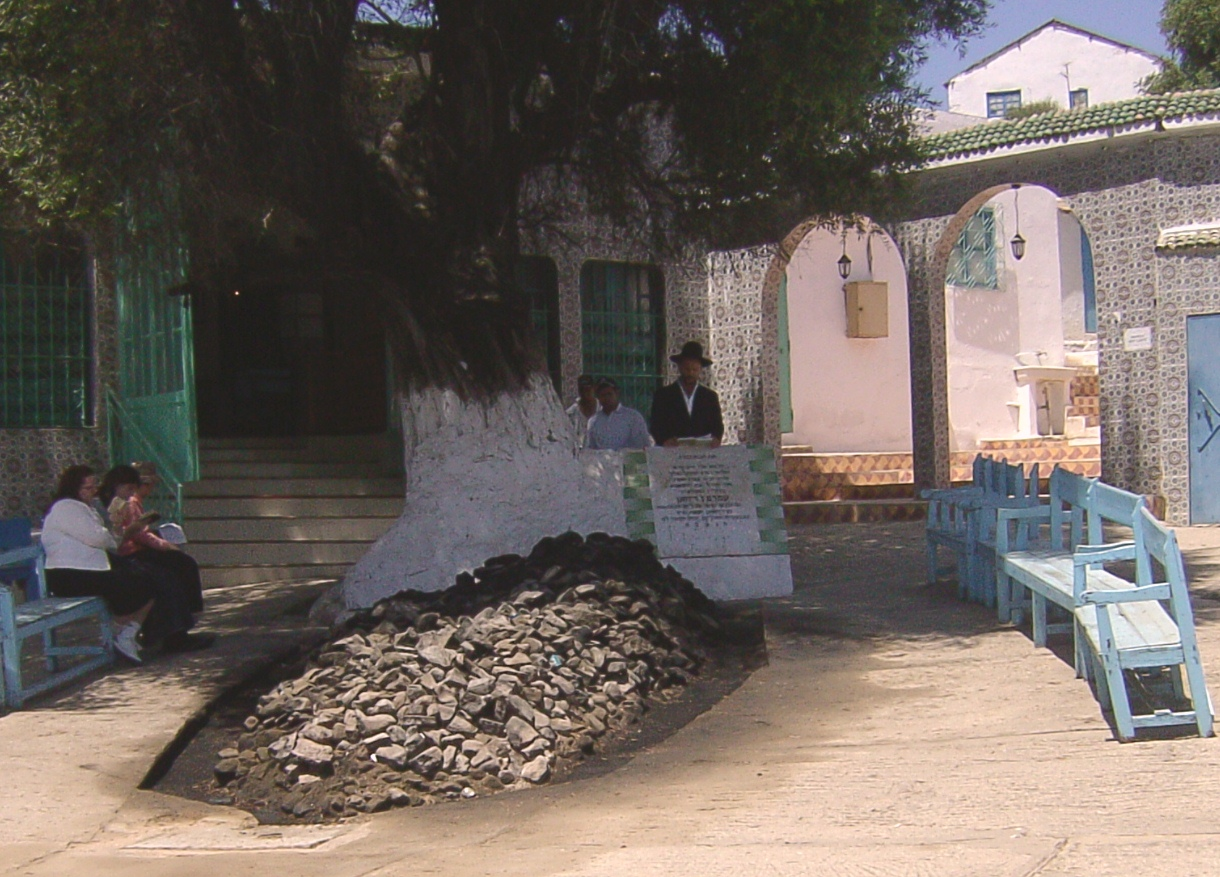
- Grave of Amram ben Diwan, Ouazzane

Personal life
- Born: Jerusalem, Ottoman Empire
- Died: 1782 Ouazzane, Morocco
- Children: Hayyim ben Diwan
- Known for: Tomb pilgrimage site
- Occupation: Rabbi

Religious life
- Religion: Judaism

Amram ben Diwan (Hebrew: עַמְרָם בֶּן דִיוָואן: died 1782, Ouazzane, Morocco) was a venerated 18th-century rabbi whose tomb has become the site of an annual pilgrimage.

Born in Jerusalem, he moved to Hebron in 1743 and was sent to collect donations from the Moroccan Jewish community for the Jews of the Holy Land. He took residence in Ouazzane, where he taught the Talmud and had many disciples.

After 10 years in Morocco, Amram returned to Hebron and, according to legend, entered the Cave of the Patriarchs disguised as a Muslim because it was forbidden for Jews at the time. Someone recognized and reported him to the Ottoman pasha, who ordered his arrest. He was compelled to flee and returned to Morocco, where he was welcomed by the Jewish community of Fes.

Ben Diwan is credited with many healing miracles and had at least one son, Hayyim ben Diwan. He fell ill while touring Morocco with his son and died in Ouazzane in 1782.

His burial place in Ouazzane became a pilgrimage site and is regularly visited, particularly by people who invoke God to heal their illness in his merit.
