= Ermila =

Place in Fès-Meknès, Morocco

- Rural commune and town
- Location within Morocco
- Coordinates: 33.1920°N 3.8509°W
- Country: Morocco
- Region: Fès-Meknès
- Province: Boulemane Province

Population (2004)
  - Total: 6,774
- Time zone: UTC+0 (GMT)

Ermila is a small town and rural commune in Boulemane Province of the Fès-Meknès region of Morocco. At the time of the 2004 census, the commune had a total population of 6774 people living in 1079 households.
