= Oulad Ali Youssef =

Oulad Ali Youssef أولاد علي يوسف
- Rural commune and town
- Location within Morocco
- Country: Morocco
- Region: Fès-Meknès
- Province: Boulemane Province

Population (2004)
  - Total: 6,669
- Time zone: UTC+0 (GMT)

Oulad Ali Youssef is a small town and rural commune in Boulemane Province of the Fès-Meknès region of Morocco. At the time of the 2004 census, the commune had a total population of 6669 people living in 1067 households.
