= Ain Aicha =

Aïn Aïcha عين عائشة
- Town
- Location within Morocco
- Coordinates: 34°29′N 4°42′W
- Country: Morocco
- Region: Taza-Al Hoceima-Taounate
- Province: Taounate Province

Population (2004)
  - Total: 22,575
- Time zone: UTC+0 (GMT)

Aïn Aïcha is a town in Taounate Province, Taza-Al Hoceima-Taounate, Morocco. According to the 2004 census it has a population of 22,575.
