= Guigou, Morocco =

Guigou گيگو ⴳⵉⴳⵓ
- Rural Commune
- Interactive map of Guigou
- Country: Morocco
- Region: Fès-Meknès
- Province: Boulemane

Population (2024)
  - Rural Commune: 24,677
  - Urban: 12,913
- Time zone: UTC+0 (GMT)

Guigou is a town and rural commune in Boulemane Province, Fès-Meknès, Morocco. According to the 2024 census it has a population of 12,913 for the town and 24,677 for the commune.

== Economy ==
the area is largely agrarian, primarily known for growing onions and potatoes, as well as raising Timahdite sheep.
