= Missour =

Missour ميسور ⵎⵉⵙⵓⵔ
- City
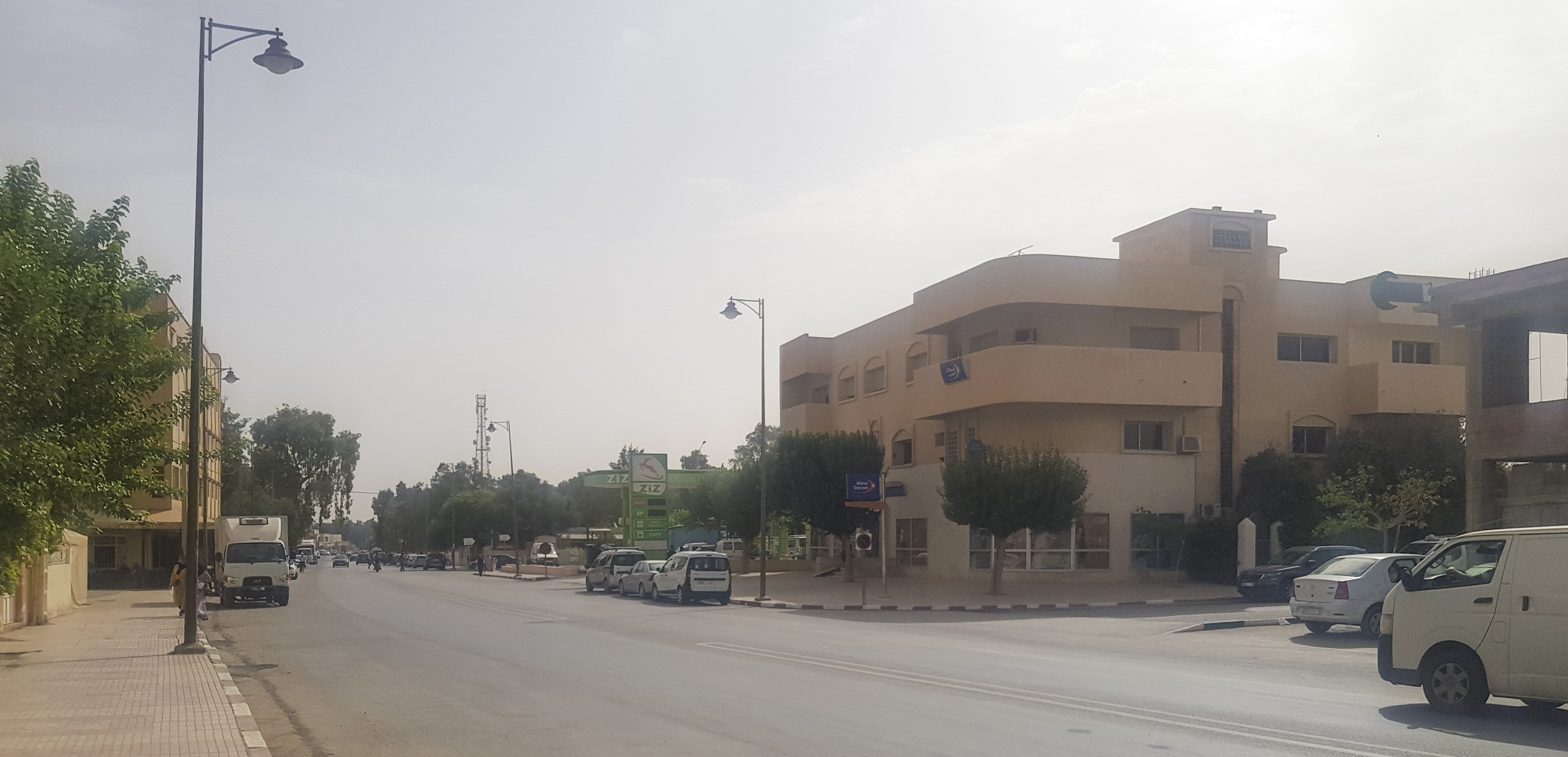
- Interactive map of Missour
- Coordinates: 33°03′N 3°59′W
- Country: Morocco
- Region: Fès-Meknès
- Province: Boulemane
- Elevation: 2,936 ft (895 m)

Population (2024)
  - Total: 28,408
- Time zone: UTC+0 (GMT)

Missour (Arabic: ميسور; Standard Moroccan Tamazight: ⵎⵉⵙⵓⵔ) is the capital and biggest city of Boulemane Province, Fès-Meknès, Morocco. According to the 2024 census it has a population of 28,408.

== Notable people ==
- Khalid Askri – Former international goalkeeper
