= Outat El Haj =

Coordinates: 33°20′N 3°41′W

Outat El Haj أوطاط الحاج
- City
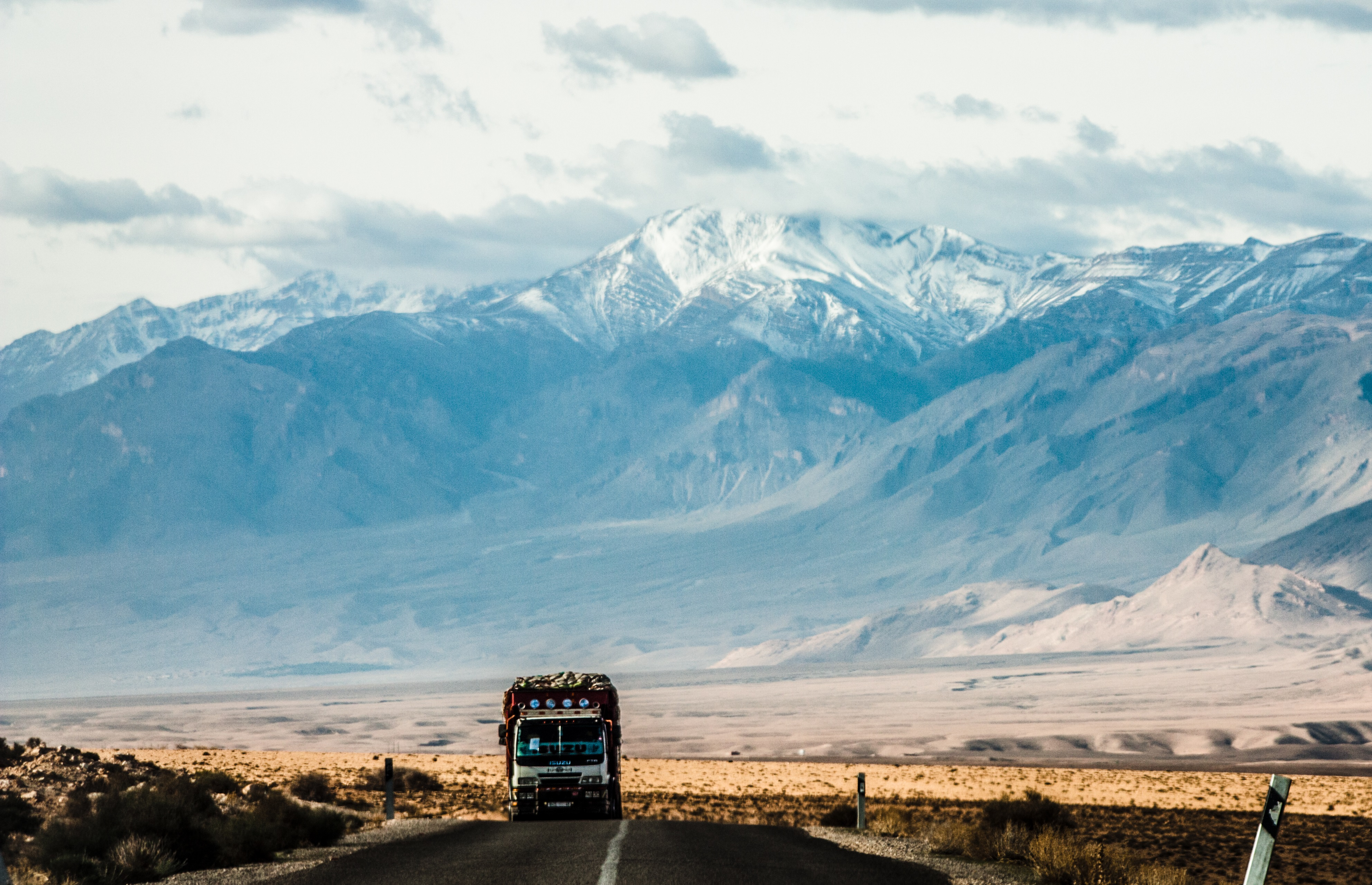
- Interactive map of Outat El Haj
- Country: Morocco
- Region: Fès-Meknès
- Province: Boulemane
- Elevation: 2,575 ft (785 m)

Population (2014)
  - Total: 16 388
- Time zone: UTC+0 (GMT)

Outat El Haj (Arabic: أوطاط الحاج, romanized: ʾŪṭāṭ al-Ḥajj) is a city in Boulemane Province, Fès-Meknès, Morocco. According to the 2014 census, it has a population of 16 388. The population consists primarily of Berber tribes from the villages in the middle Atlas mountains (Beni Hayoune, Oulad Ali, Tsiouant...) and Arab tribes from the low lands towards Guercif and Talsint.

Outat el Hadj is well known for its olive tree gardens and its exquisite olive oil.

Outat El Haj is situated near the Middle Atlas Mountains and is known for its green landscapes and agricultural production, including olives, fruits, and vegetables. The City also serves as a gateway to mountainous and rocky landscapes in eastern Morocco and is frequented by off-road and outdoor adventure enthusiasts.
