= Touzet =

Touzet is a surname. Notable people with the surname include:

- Carlos Prio-Touzet (born 1955), Cuban architect
- Corinne Touzet (born 1959), French actress
- Jean Touzet du Vigier (1888–1980), French lieutenant-general
- René Touzet (1916–2003), Cuban-born American composer, pianist, band leader
