= Ain Dfali =

Ain Défali عين الدفالي
- Rural commune and town
- Location within Morocco
- Country: Morocco
- Region: Rabat-Salé-Kénitra
- Province: Sidi Kacem

Population (2004)
  - Total: 24,521
- Time zone: UTC+0 (GMT)

Ain Défali is a small town and rural commune in Sidi Kacem Province, Rabat-Salé-Kénitra, Morocco. At the time of the 2004 census, the commune had a total population of 24,521 people living in 4222 households.
