= Fès-Boulemane =

Fès-Boulemane فاس بولمان
- Region
- Location in Morocco
- Coordinates: 34°2′N 5°0′W
- Country: Morocco
- Capital: Fès

Area
  - Total: 19,795 km^{2} (7,643 sq mi)

Population (2014 census)
  - Total: 1,808,295
- Time zone: UTC+0 (WET)
  - Summer (DST): UTC+1 (WEST)
- ISO 3166 code: MA-05

Fès-Boulemane (Arabic: فاس بولمان) was formerly one of the sixteen regions of Morocco from 1997 to 2015. It was situated in an agricultural region of northern Morocco, and borders Rif Mountains to the north. It covered an area of 19,795 km^{2} and had a population of 1,808,295 (2014 census). The capital was Fès. In 2015, it expanded Taounate and Taza Provinces (formerly from the Taza-Al Hoceima-Taounate Region); and Meknès Prefecture and El Hajeb and Ifrane Provinces (formerly from the Meknès-Tafilalet Region) to form the Region of Fès-Meknès.

== Administrative divisions ==
The region was made up of the following provinces and prefectures :

- Prefecture of Fès-Dar-Dbibegh
- Moulay Yacoub Province
- Sefrou Province
- Boulemane Province

== Subdivisions ==
flag	province / prefecture	communities	surface area (Km2)	post code	population (2 September 2004)	population (2 September 2014)
Boulmane Province	Boulemane Province _{(MA-BES)}		14395 km ^{2}	33XXX	185.110	???
		Boulemane		33003	6.910	???
		Imouzzer Marmoucha		33152	4.001	???
		Missour (capital of the province)		33252	20.978	???
		Outat El Haj		33304	13.945	???
		Ait Bazza		33172	3.480	???
		Ait El Mane		33173	2.243	???
		Almis Marmoucha		33174	2.698	???
		El Mers		33102	5.891	???
		Enjil, Morocco		33002	8.164	???
		Guigou, Morocco (Almis Guigou)		33053	19.035	???
		Serghina		؟؟؟؟؟	3.726	???
		Skoura M'Daz		33352	8.713	???
		Talzemt		33176	3.710	???
		Ksabi Moulouya		33202	10.067	???
		Ouizeght		33273	5.509	???
		Sidi Boutayeb		؟؟؟؟؟	9.522	???
		El Orjane		33324	7.609	???
		Ermila		؟؟؟؟؟	6.774	???
		Fritissa		33322	26.022	???
		Oulad Ali Youssef		33302	6.669	???
		Tissaf		33323	9.444	???
	Prefecture of Fez ^{(MA-FES)}		312 km ^{2}	30XXX	977.946	???
		Fes-Agdal (Arrondissement)		30000	144.064	???
		Fes-Medina (Arrondissement)		30202	91.473	???
		Jnan El Ouard (Arrondissement)		30120	174.226	???
		Zouagha (Arrondissement)		30020, 30043	163.291	???
		El Mariniyine (Arrondissement)		30024	191.093	???
		Saiss (Arrondissement)		30022	156.590	???
		Mechouar Fes Jdid (Arrondissement)		30005	26.078	???
		Oulad Tayeb		30023	19.144	???
		Ain Bida		؟؟؟؟؟	6.854	???
		Sidi Harazem		30205	5.133	???
		Skhinate		؟؟؟؟؟	3.317	???
	Sefrou Province ^{(MA-SEF)}			31XXX	259.577	???
		Bhalil		31100	11.638	???
		Ribate El Kheir (Ahermoumou prev.)		31350	12.654	???
		El Menzel		31200	11.484	???
		Adrej		31003	2.236	???
		Ain Timguenai		؟؟؟؟؟	5.778	???
		Bir Tam Tam		31152	9.714	???
		Dar El Hamra		31026	4.022	???
		Ighzrane		31372	11.050	???
		Mtarnagha		31222	5.284	???
		Oulad Mkoudou		31202	7.821	???
		Ras Tabouda		31302	6.516	???
		Tafajight		31032	2.047	???
		Imouzzer Kandar		31250	13.745	???
		Ain Cheggag		31052	15.475	???
		Ait Sebaa Lajrouf		31272	17.400	???
		Sefrou (Capital of the province)		31000	64.006	???
		Aghbalou Aqorar		31023	15.835	???
		Ahl Sidi Lahcen		31025	5.290	???
		Azzaba		31002	2.493	???
		Kandar Sidi Khiar		؟؟؟؟؟	8.709	???
		Laanoussar		؟؟؟؟؟	9.343	???
		Sidi Youssef Ben Ahmed		31024	11.292	???
		Tazouta		31004	5.745	???
	Moulay Yacoub Province ^{(MA-MOU)}			36XXX	150.422	???
		Moulay Yacoub		36150	3.153	???
		Ain Chkef		36122	36.368	???
		Mikkes		36125	6.773	???
		Sebaa Rouadi		36104	20.695	???
		Sebt Loudaya		؟؟؟؟؟	12.232	???
		Ain Bou Ali		؟؟؟؟؟	12.269	???
		Ain Kansra		36222	11.534	???
		Laajajra		36124	13.931	???
		Louadaine		؟؟؟؟؟	11.283	???
		Oulad Mimoun		36126	9.393	???
		Sidi Daoud, Morocco		36172	12.791	???
