= Zaouiat Bougrine =

Zaouiat Bougrine Zaouiat Ain Timgenay
- Town
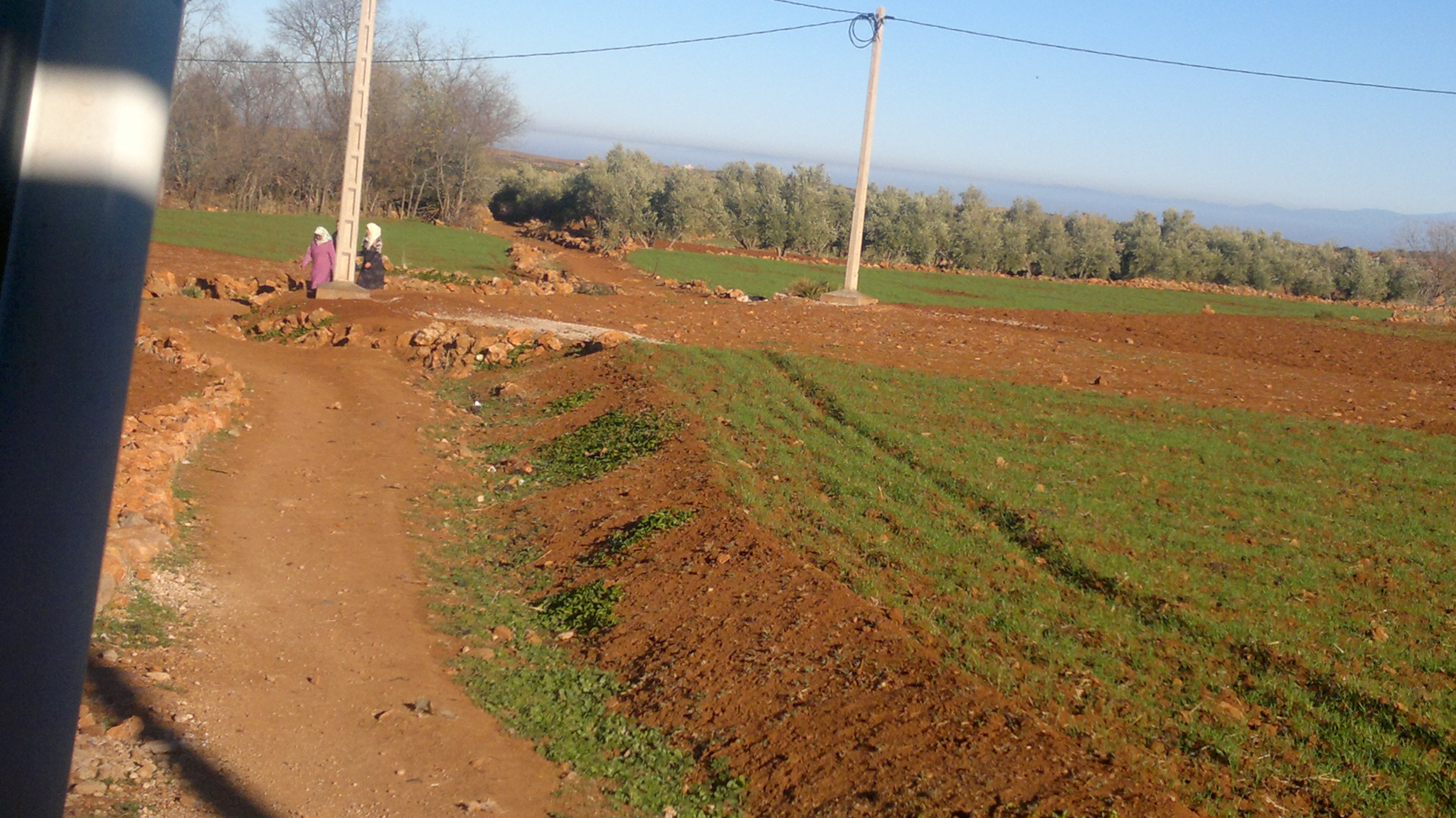
- Farmland in Zaouiat Bougrine
- Nickname: Zaouia
- Interactive map of Zaouiat Bougrine
- Coordinates: 33.856°N 4.489°W
- Country: Morocco
- Region: Fès-Meknès
- Province: Sefrou Province

Population (2004)
  - Total: 3,570
- Time zone: UTC+0 (GMT)

Zaouiat Bougrine is a town in Sefrou Province, Fès-Meknès, Morocco. According to the 2004 census it has a population of 3,570.
