= Azzaba, Morocco =

Azzaba عزابة
- Commune
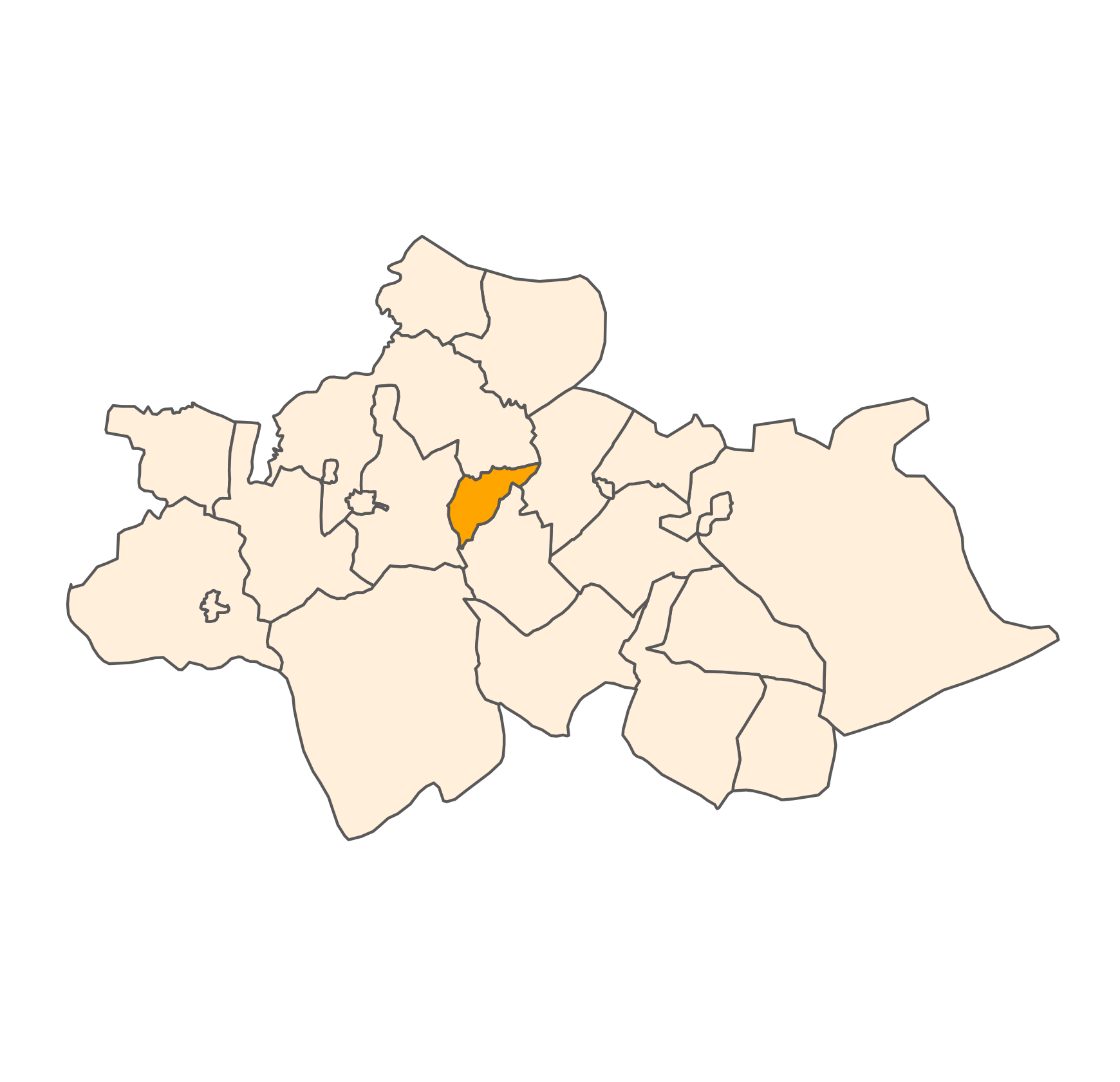
- Rural Commune of Azzaba

- Location in Morocco
- Coordinates: 34°37′N 5°13′W
- Country: Morocco
- Region: Fès-Meknès
- Province: Sefrou

Population (2004)
  - Total: 2,493
- Time zone: UTC+0 (GMT)

Azzaba is a commune in Sefrou Province of the Fès-Meknès administrative region of Morocco. At the time of the 2004 census, the commune had a total population of 2493 people living in 515 households.
