= Imouzzer Kandar =

Coordinates: 33°43′48″N 5°00′36″W

Imouzzer Kandar إموزار كندر ⵉⵎⵓⵣⵣⴰⵔ ⴽⵏⴹⵕ
- Town
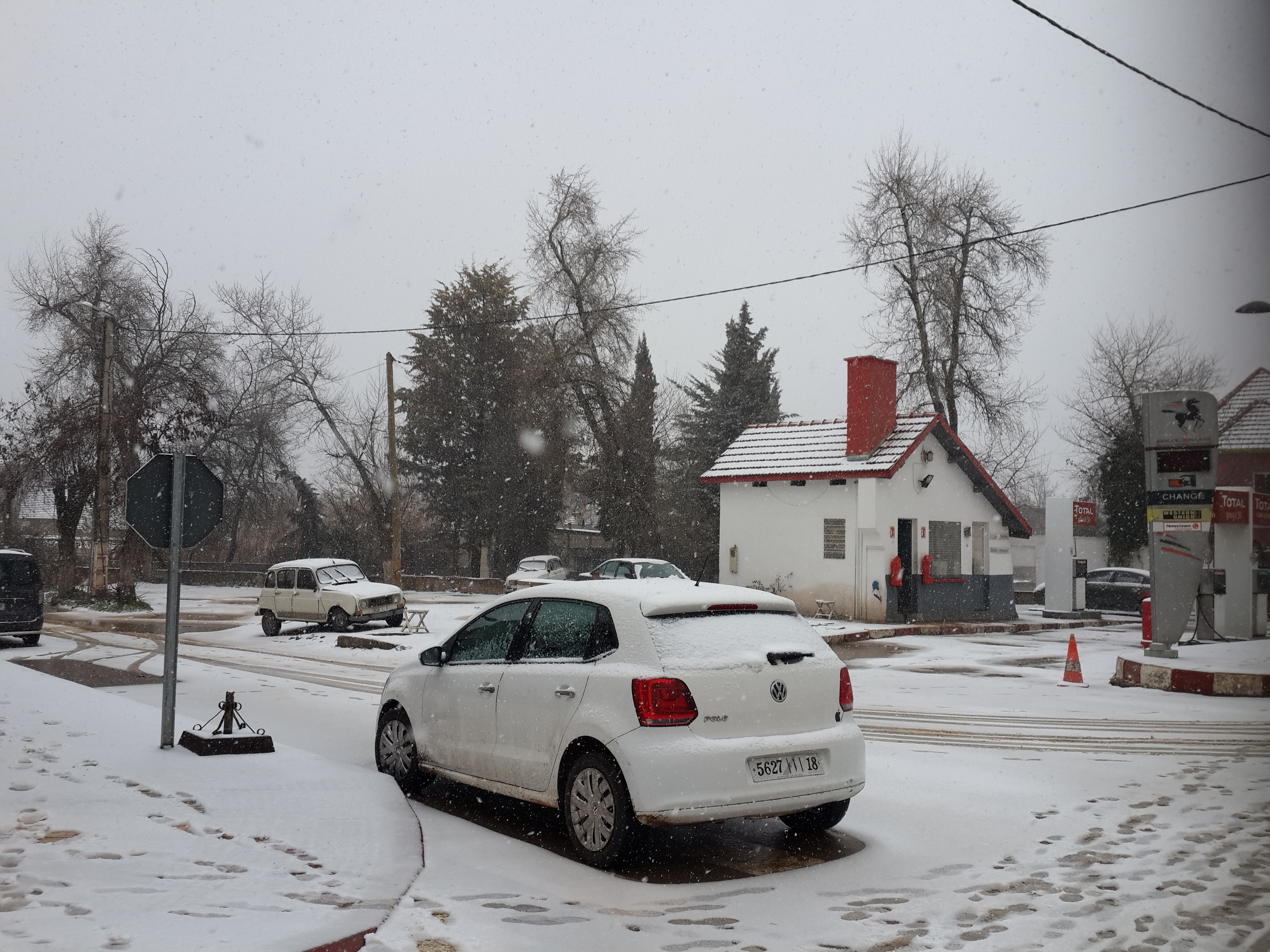
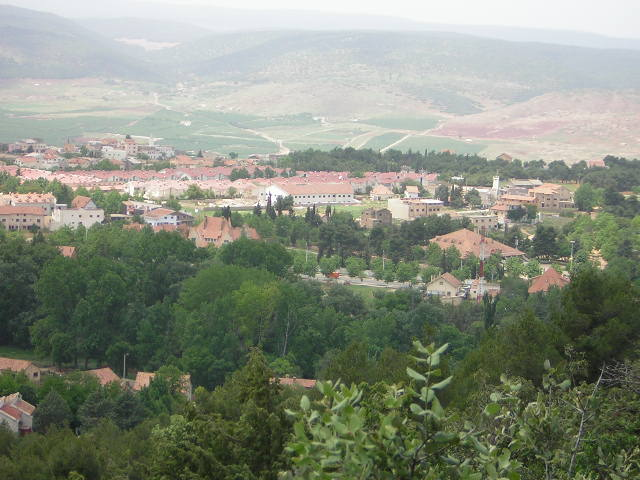
- Interactive map of Imouzzer Kandar
- Country: Morocco
- Region: Fès-Meknès
- Province: Sefrou Province

Government
  - Mayor: Mustapha Lakhsem

Population (2024)
  - Total: 21,943
- Time zone: UTC+0 (GMT)
- Postal code: 31250

Imouzzer Kandar is a town in Sefrou Province, Fès-Meknès, Morocco. According to the 2024 census it has a population of 21,943. It is inhabited by the Ait Seghrouchen.
