= Adrej =

- commune
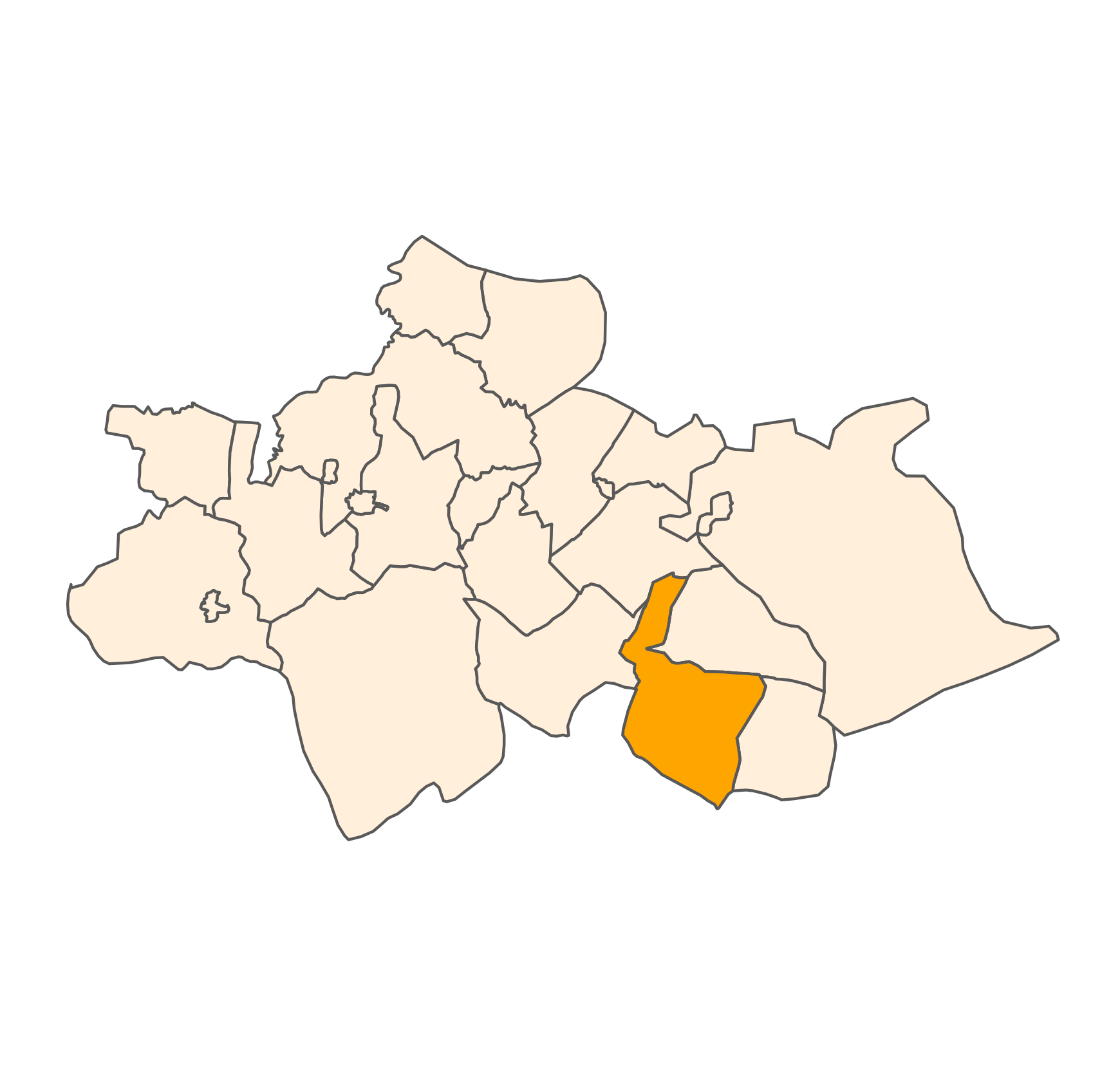
- Rural Commune of Adrej

- Location in Morocco
- Coordinates: 33.6232°N 4.4418°W
- Country: Morocco
- Region: Fès-Meknès
- Province: Sefrou

Government
  - Mayor: Hassan Loudiyi

Area
  - Total: 191.9258 km^{2} (74.1030 sq mi)

Population (2004)
  - Total: 2,236
  - Density: 11.65/km^{2} (30.2/sq mi)
- Time zone: UTC+0 (GMT)

Adrej is a commune in Sefrou Province, Fès-Meknès, Morocco. At the time of the 2004 census, the commune had a population of 2,236 living in 479 households.
