= Ain Cheggag =

Ain Cheggag عين الشكاك
- Town
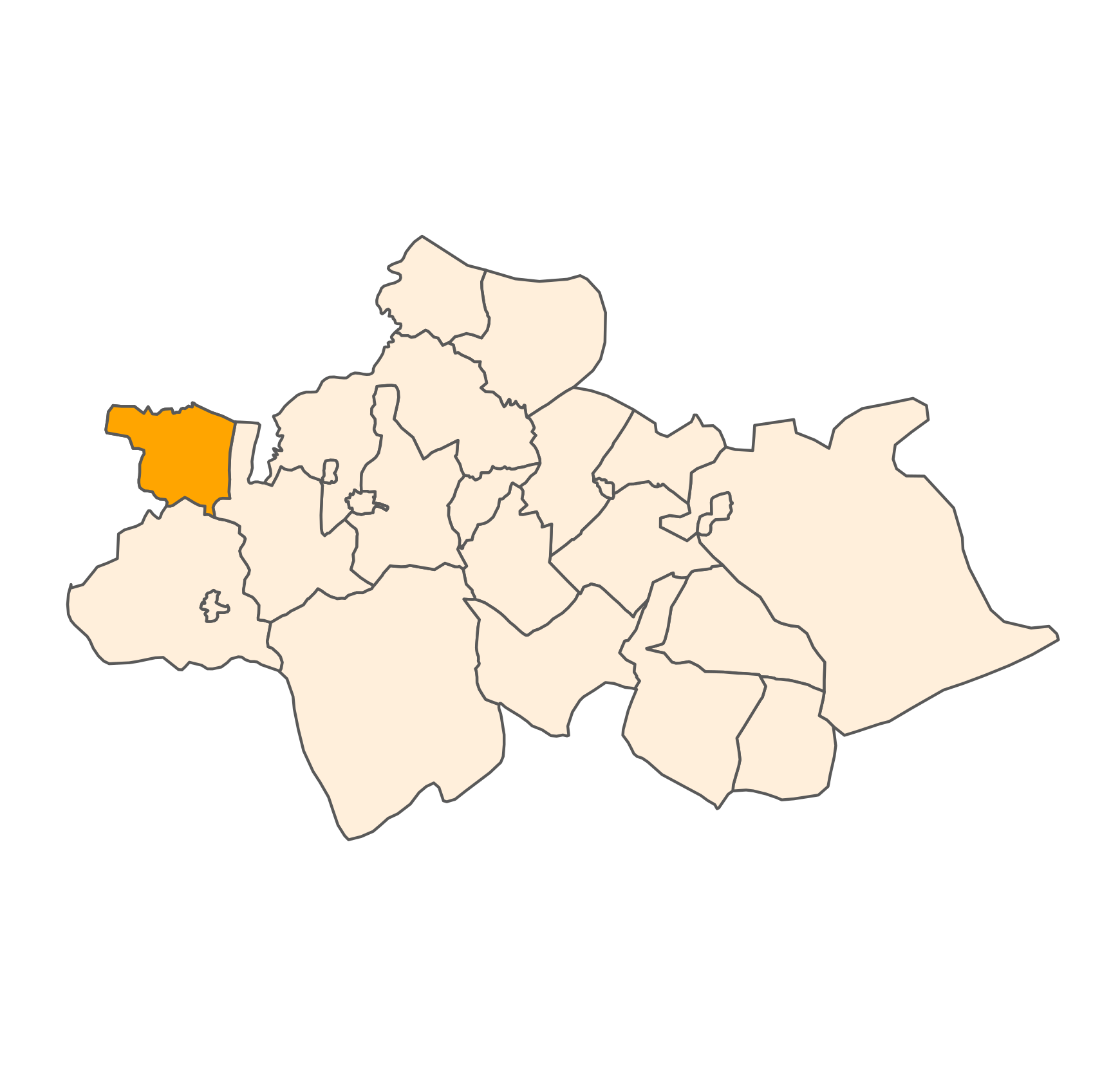
- Rural Commune of Ain Cheggag

- Location in Morocco
- Coordinates: 33°53′N 5°02′W
- Country: Morocco
- Region: Fès-Meknès
- Province: Sefrou Province

Population (2004)
  - Total: 4,436
- Time zone: UTC+0 (GMT)

Ain Cheggag is a town in Sefrou Province, Fès-Meknès, Morocco. According to the 2004 census it has a population of 4,436.
