= Aghbalou Aqorar =

- commune
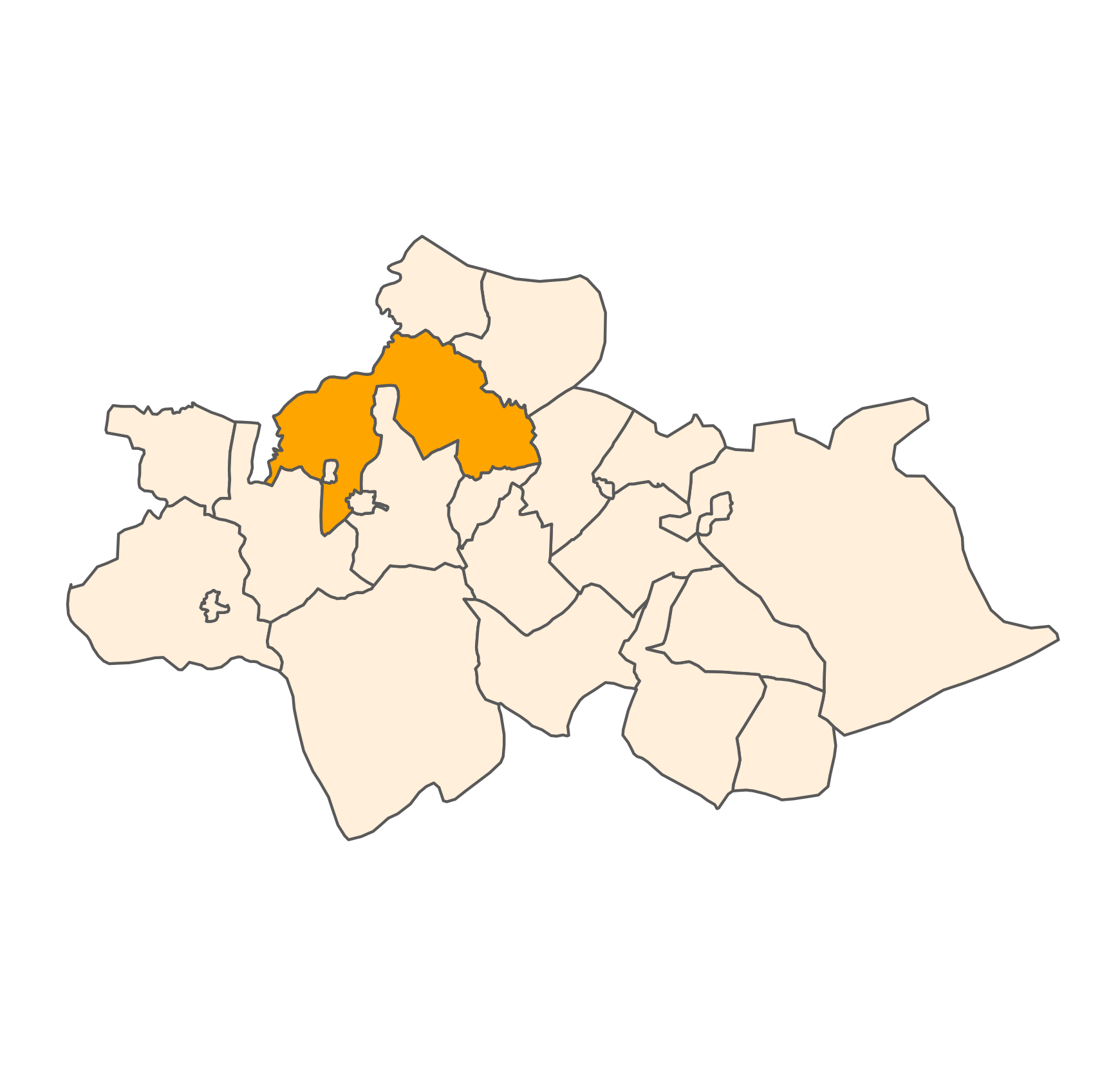
- Rural Commune of Aghbalou Aqorar

- Location in Morocco
- Coordinates: 33.9341°N 4.7381°W
- Country: Morocco
- Region: Fès-Meknès
- Province: Sefrou

Population (2004)
  - Total: 15,835
- Time zone: UTC+0 (GMT)

Aghbalou Aqorar is a commune in Sefrou Province, Fès-Meknès, Morocco. At the time of the 2004 census, the commune had a total population of 15,835 people living in 3044 households.
