= Tafajight =

- commune
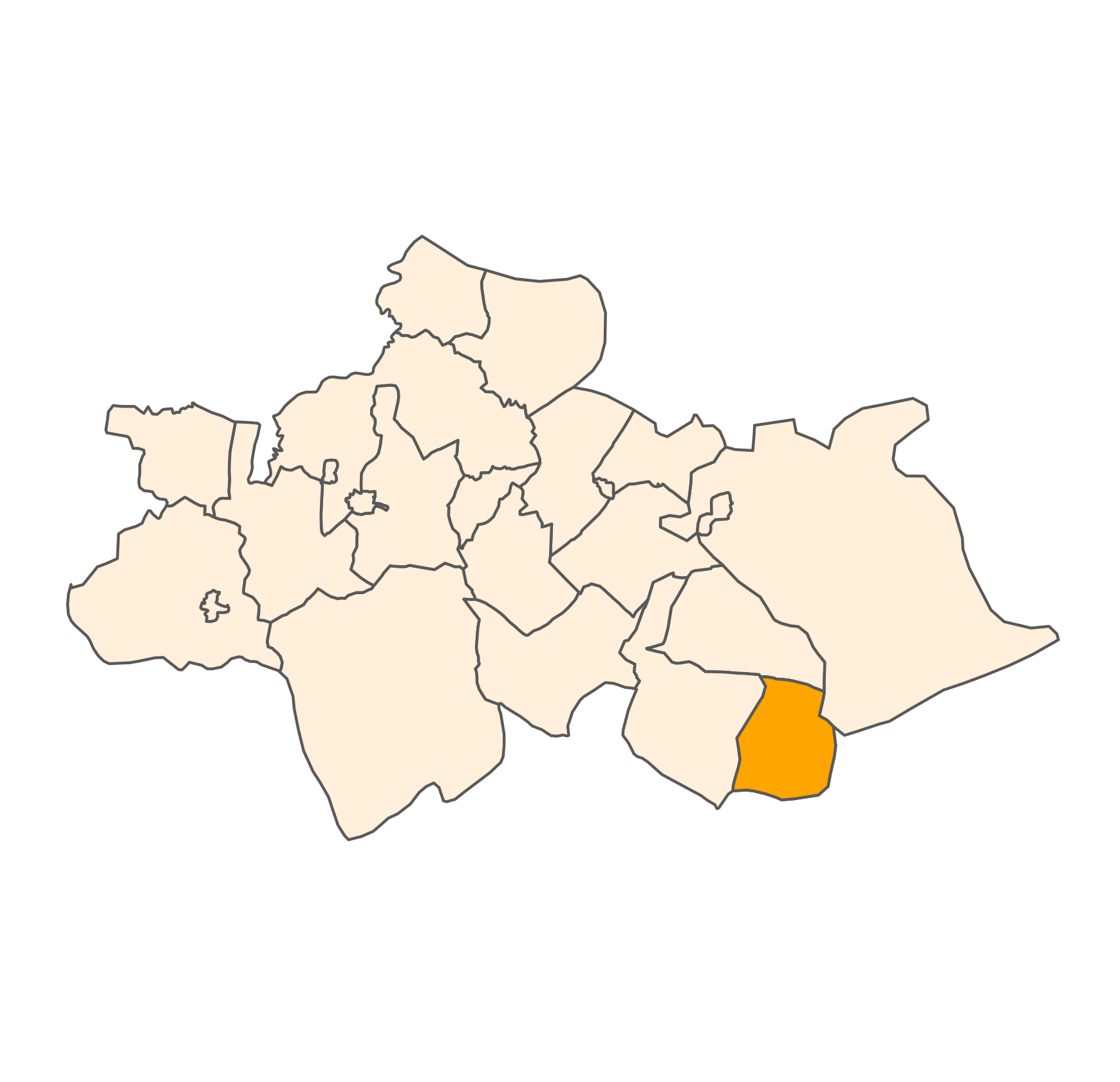
- Tafajight

- Location in Morocco
- Coordinates: 33.5417°N 4.2917°W
- Country: Morocco
- Region: Fès-Meknès
- Province: Sefrou

Population (2004)
  - Total: 2,047
- Time zone: UTC+0 (GMT)

Tafajight is a commune in Sefrou Province, Fès-Meknès, Morocco. At the time of the 2004 census, the commune had a total population of 2047 people living in 330 households.
