= Oulad Mkoudou =

- commune
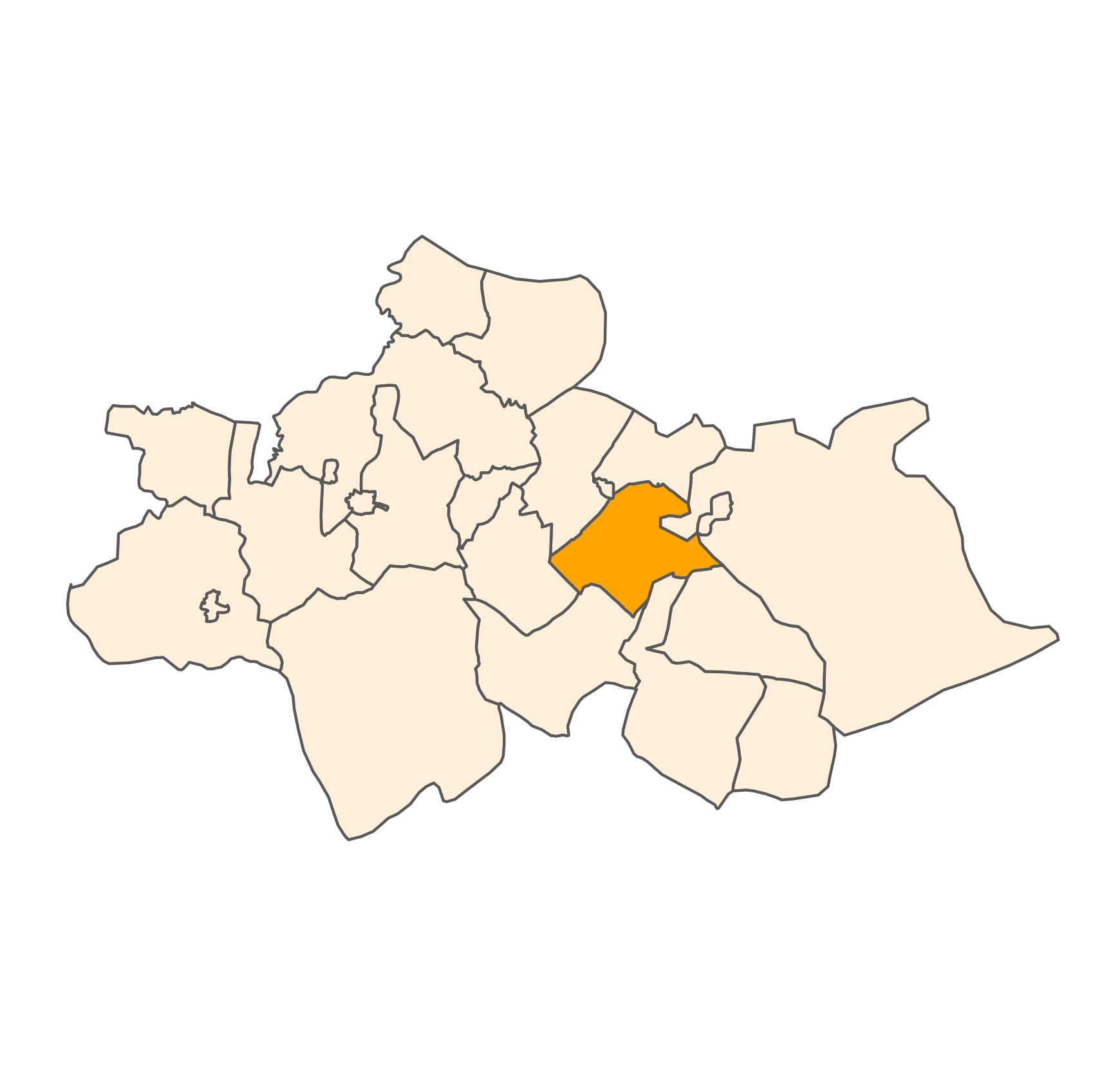
- Oulad Mkoudou

- Location in Morocco
- Coordinates: 33.8136°N 4.5170°W
- Country: Morocco
- Region: Fès-Meknès
- Province: Sefrou

Population (2004)
  - Total: 7,821
- Time zone: UTC+0 (GMT)

Oulad Mkoudou is a commune in Sefrou Province, Fès-Meknès, Morocco. At the time of the 2004 census, the commune had a total population of 7821 people living in 1523 households.
