= Bir Tam Tam =

- commune
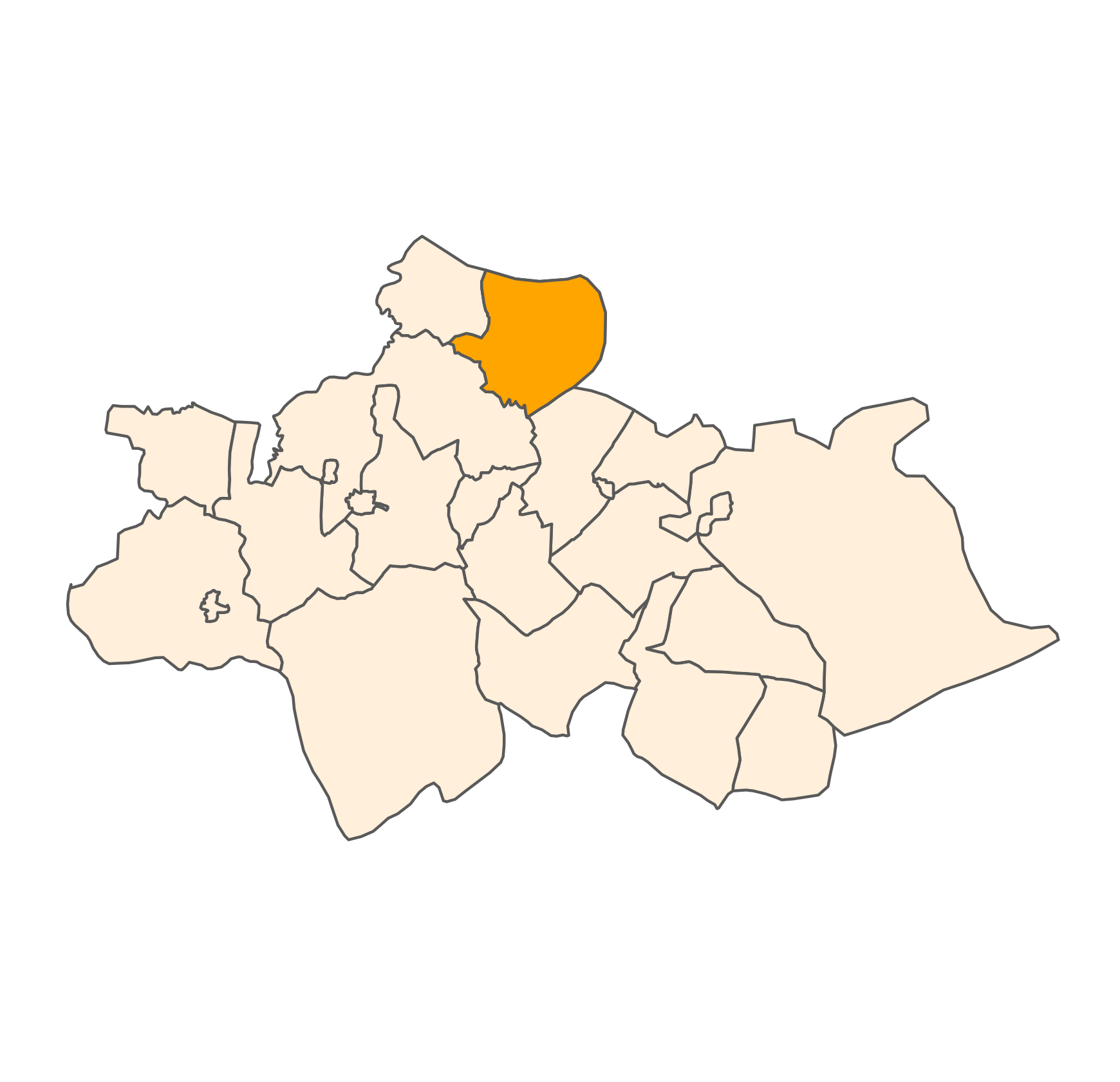
- Rural Commune of Bir Tam Tam

- Location in Morocco
- Coordinates: 33°59′N 4°38′W
- Country: Morocco
- Region: Fès-Meknès
- Province: Sefrou

Population (2004)
  - Total: 9,714
- Time zone: UTC+0 (GMT)

Bir Tam Tam is a commune in Sefrou Province of the Fès-Meknès administrative region of Morocco. At the time of the 2004 census, the commune had a total population of 9714 people living in 1818 households.
