= Tazouta =

Tazouta تازوطة
- commune
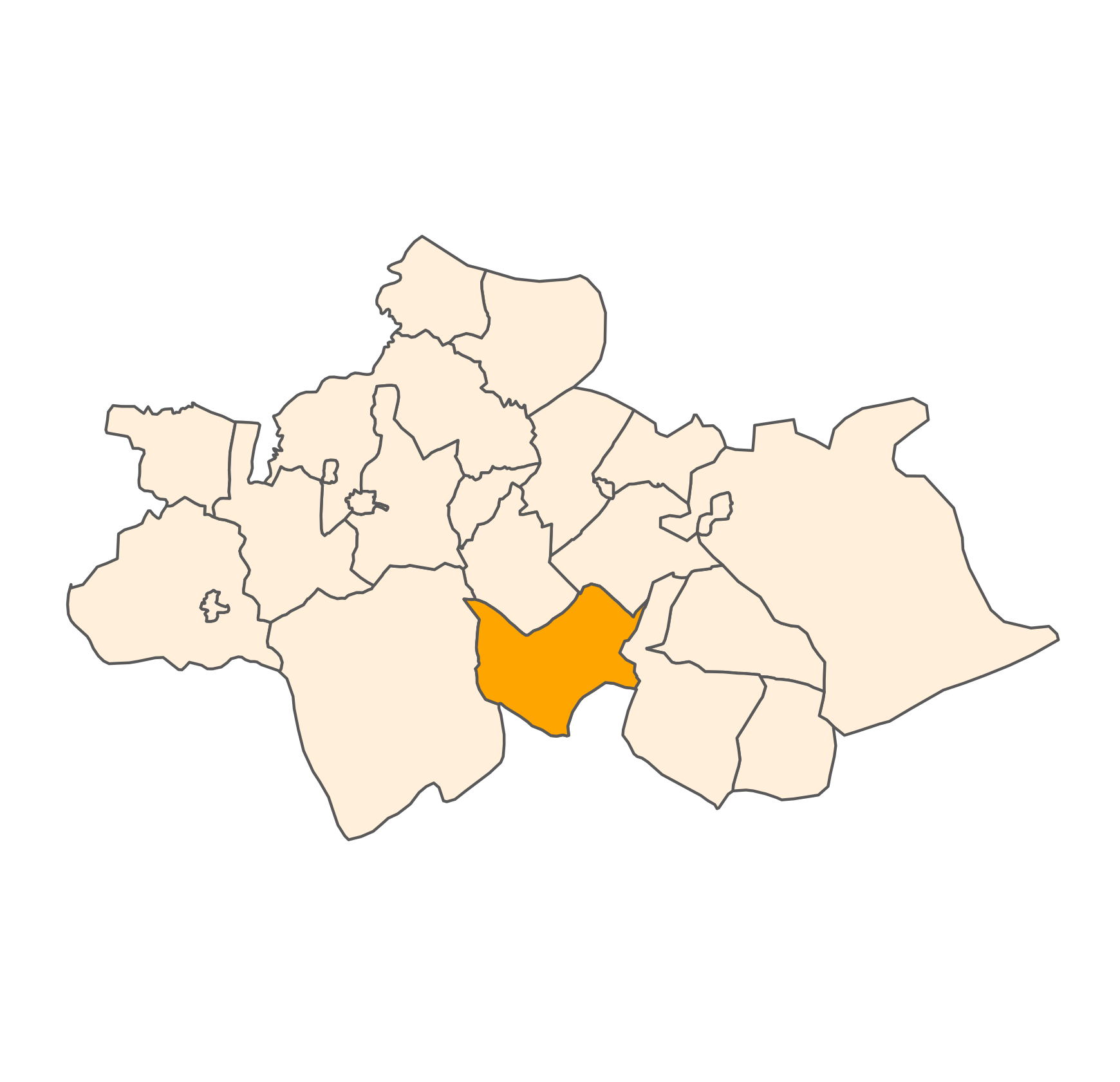
- Tazouta

- Location in Morocco
- Coordinates: 33°40′N 4°38′W
- Country: Morocco
- Region: Fès-Meknès
- Province: Sefrou

Population (2004)
  - Total: 5,745
- Time zone: UTC+0 (GMT)

Tazouta (Arabic: تازوطة) is a commune in Sefrou Province, Fès-Meknès, Morocco. At the time of the 2004 census, the commune had a total population of 5745 people living in 1098 households.
