= Dar El Hamra =

- commune
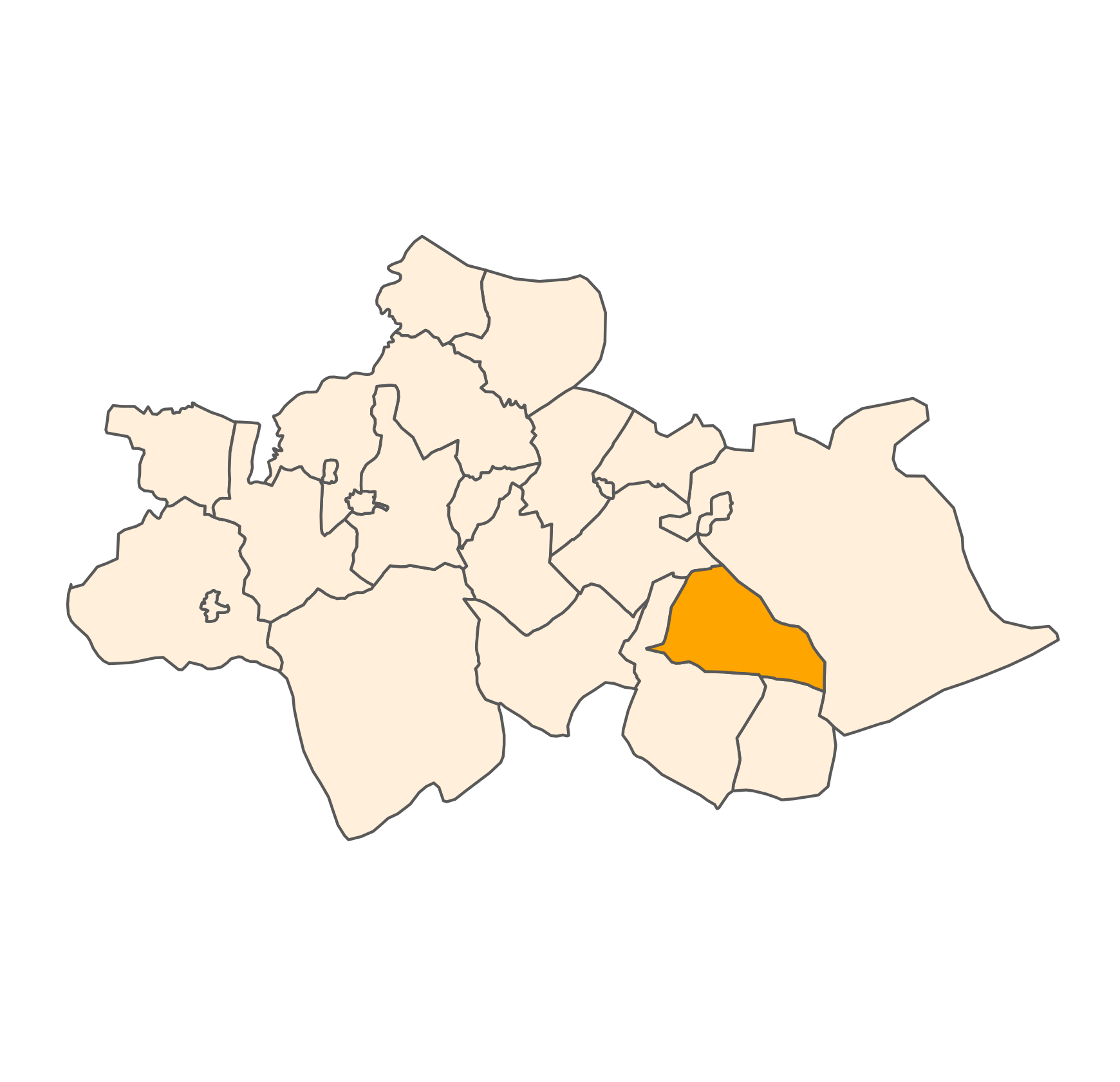
- Rural Commune of Dar El Hamra

- Location in Morocco
- Coordinates: 33.6957°N 4.3716°W
- Country: Morocco
- Region: Fès-Meknès
- Province: Sefrou

Population (2004)
  - Total: 4,022
- Time zone: UTC+0 (GMT)

Dar El Hamra is a commune in Sefrou Province, Fès-Meknès, Morocco. At the time of the 2004 census, the commune had a total population of 4022 people living in 841 households.
