= Ras Tabouda =

- commune
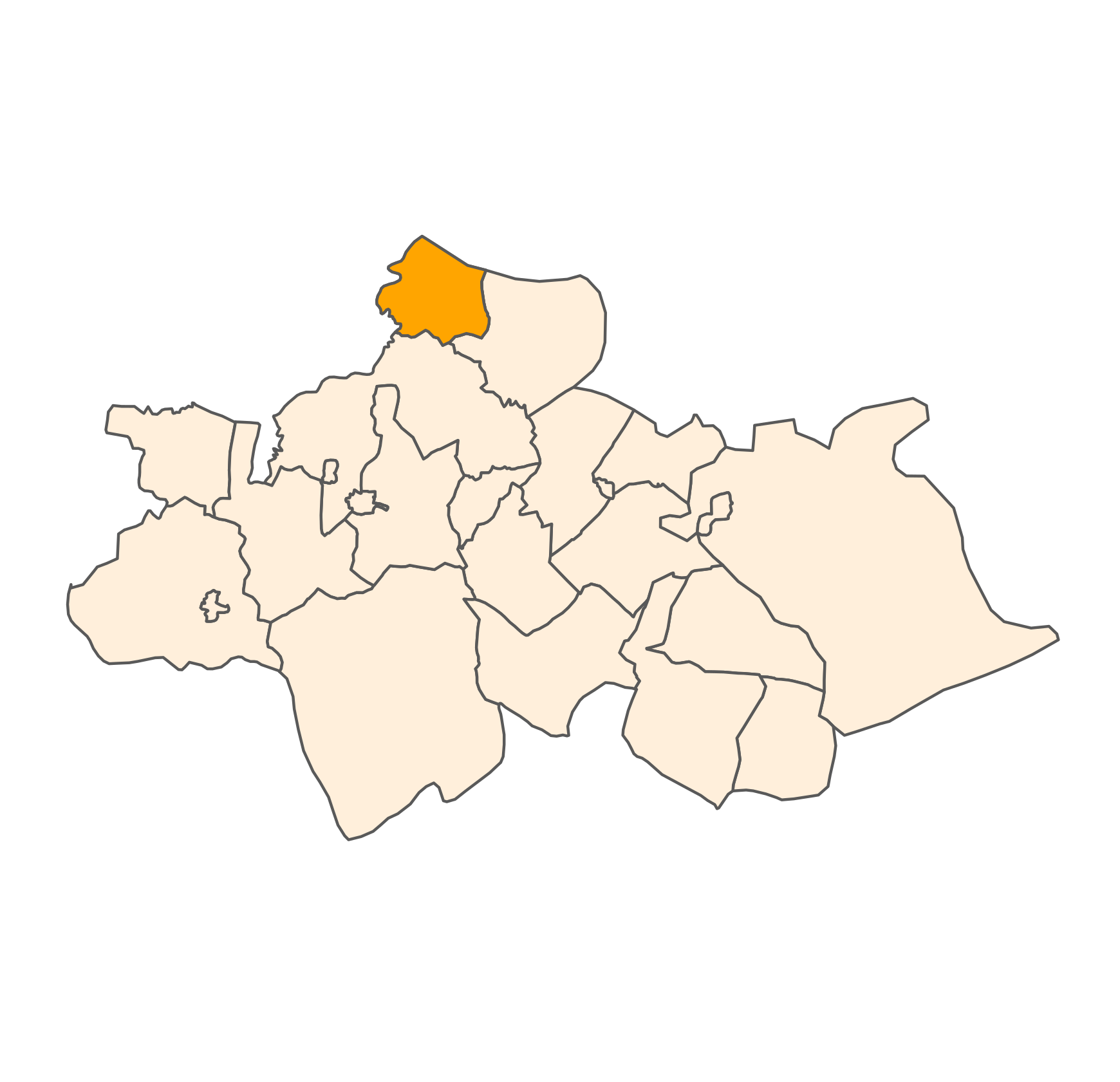
- Ras Tabouda

- Location in Morocco
- Coordinates: 34°00′N 4°43′W
- Country: Morocco
- Region: Fès-Meknès
- Province: Sefrou

Population (2004)
  - Total: 6,516
- Time zone: UTC+0 (GMT)

Ras Tabouda is a commune in Sefrou Province, Fès-Meknès, Morocco. At the time of the 2004 census, the commune had a population of 6,516 living in 1,202 households.
