= Mtarnagha =

- commune
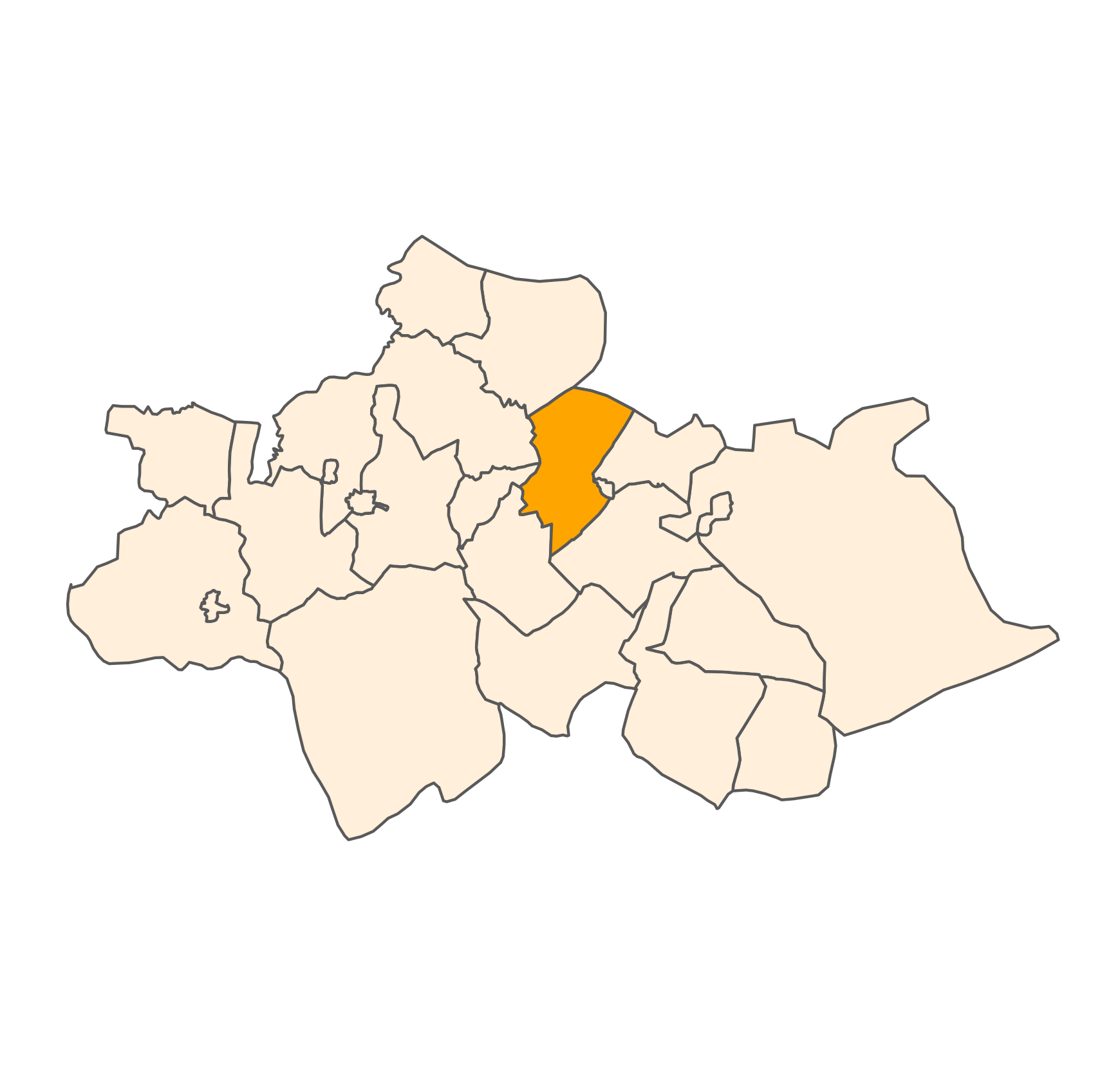
- Rural Commune of Mtarnagha

- Location in Morocco
- Coordinates: 33.8519°N 4.5750°W
- Country: Morocco
- Region: Fès-Meknès
- Province: Sefrou

Population (2004)
  - Total: 5,284
- Time zone: UTC+0 (GMT)

Mtarnagha is a commune in Sefrou Province, Fès-Meknès, Morocco. At the time of the 2004 census, the commune had a total population of 5284 people living in 982 households.
