= Ighzrane =

- commune
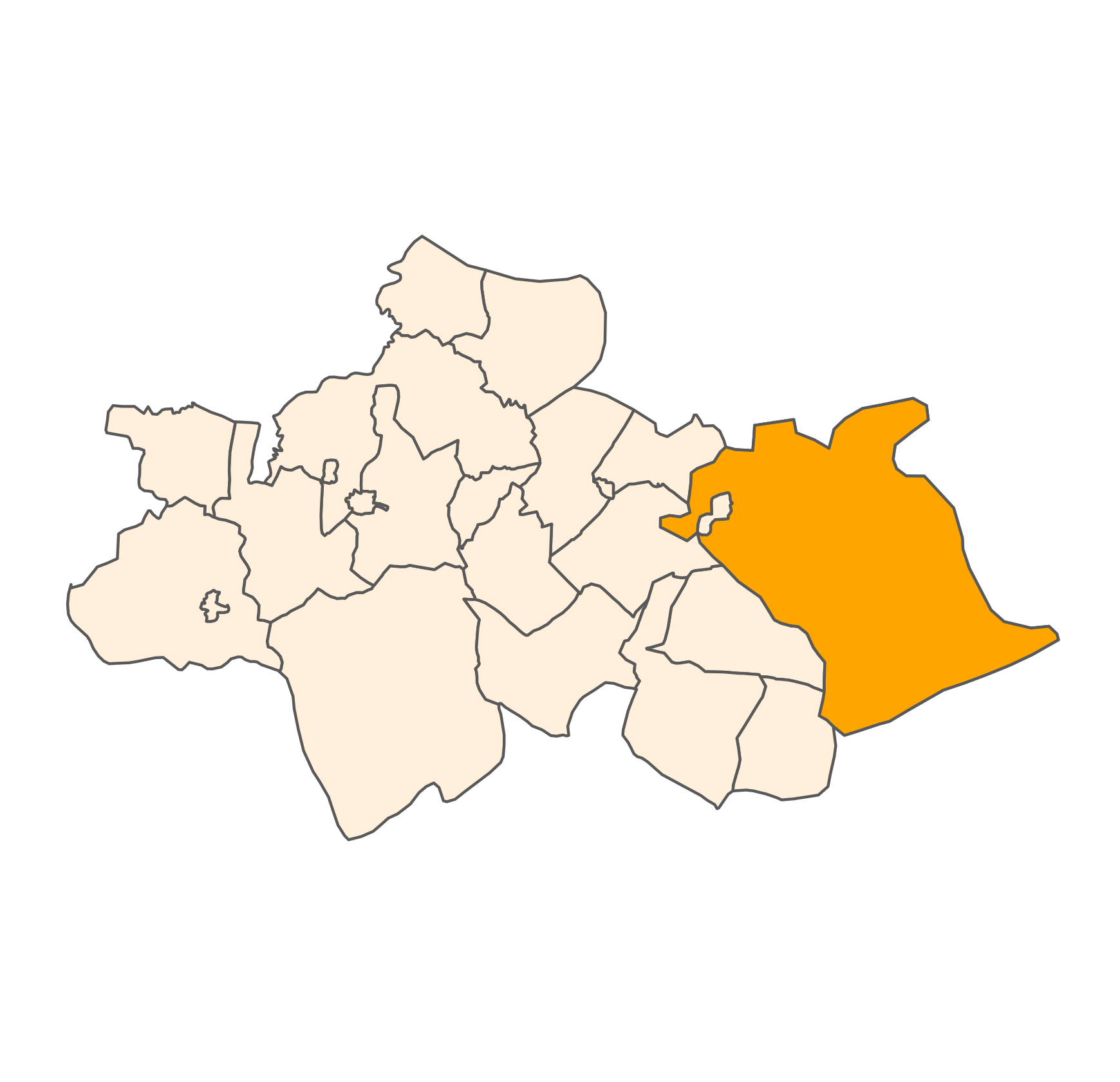
- Rural Commune of Ighzrane

- Location in Morocco
- Coordinates: 33.8085°N 4.3813°W
- Country: Morocco
- Region: Fès-Meknès
- Province: Sefrou

Population (2004)
  - Total: 11,050
- Time zone: UTC+0 (GMT)

Ighzrane is a commune in Sefrou Province, Fès-Meknès, Morocco. At the time of the 2004 census, the commune had a total population of 11,050 people living in 2064 households.
