= El Menzel =

Coordinates: 33°50′20″N 4°32′45″W

- Town
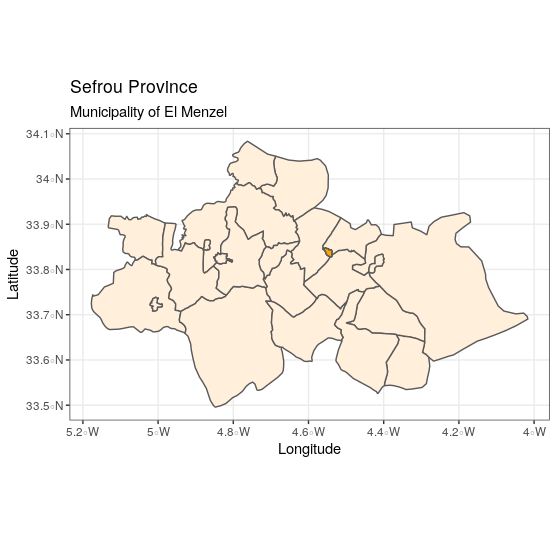
- Municipality of El Menzel (Orange) - Sefrou Province (Antique White)
- Interactive map of El Menzel
- Country: Morocco
- Region: Fès-Meknès
- Province: Sefrou Province

Population (2004)
  - Total: 11,484
- Time zone: UTC+0 (GMT)

El Menzel is a town in Sefrou Province, Fès-Meknès, Morocco. According to the 2004 census it has a population of 11,484.
