= Ahl Sidi Lahcen =

- commune
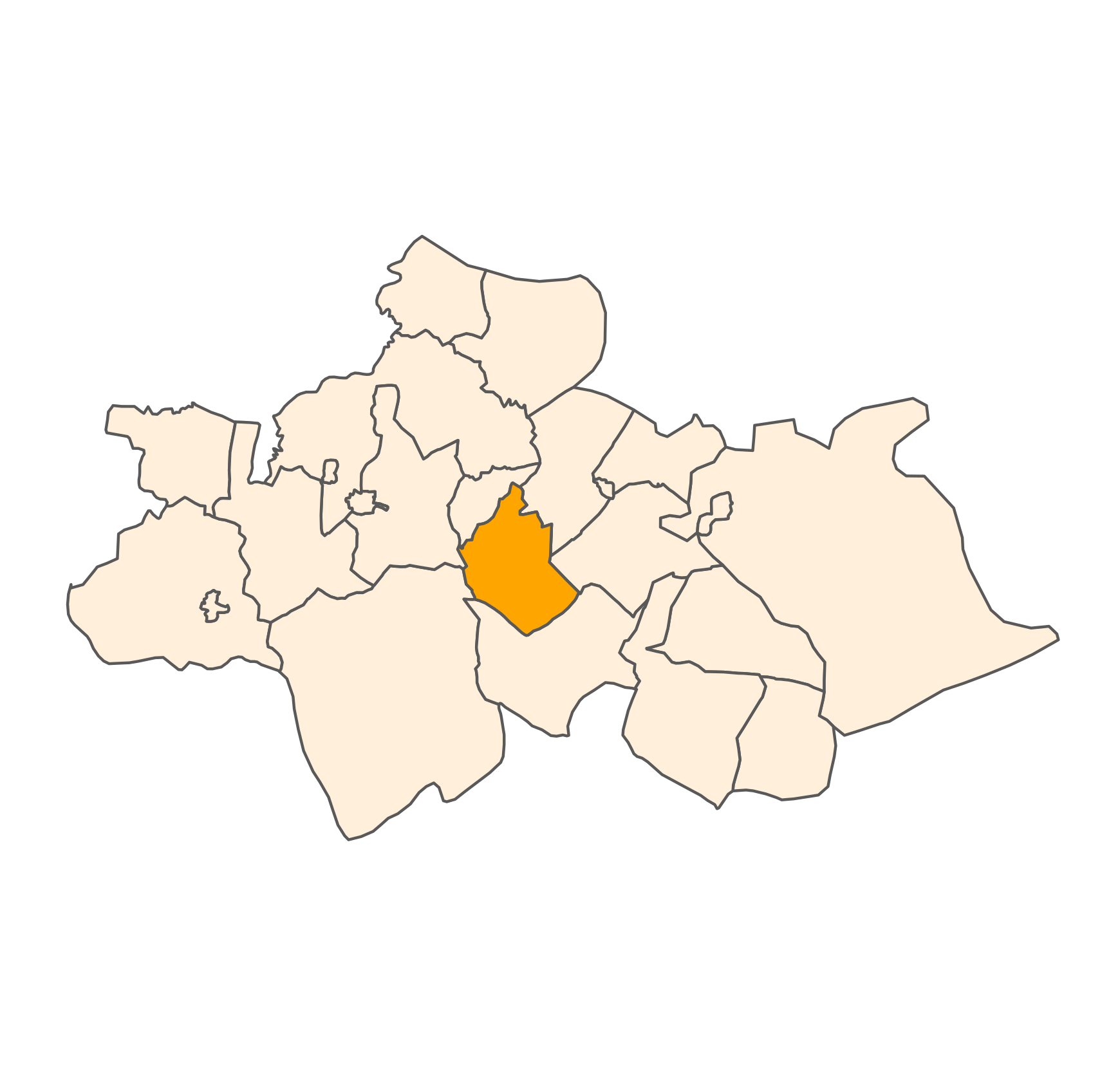
- Rural Commune of Ahl Sidi Lahcen

- Location in Morocco
- Coordinates: 33.7891°N 4.6804°W
- Country: Morocco
- Region: Fès-Meknès
- Province: Sefrou

Population (2004)
  - Total: 5,290
- Time zone: UTC+0 (GMT)

Ahl Sidi Lahcen is a commune in Sefrou Province, Fès-Meknès, Morocco. At the time of the 2004 census, the commune had a total population of 5290 people living in 993 households.
