= Laanoussar =

- commune
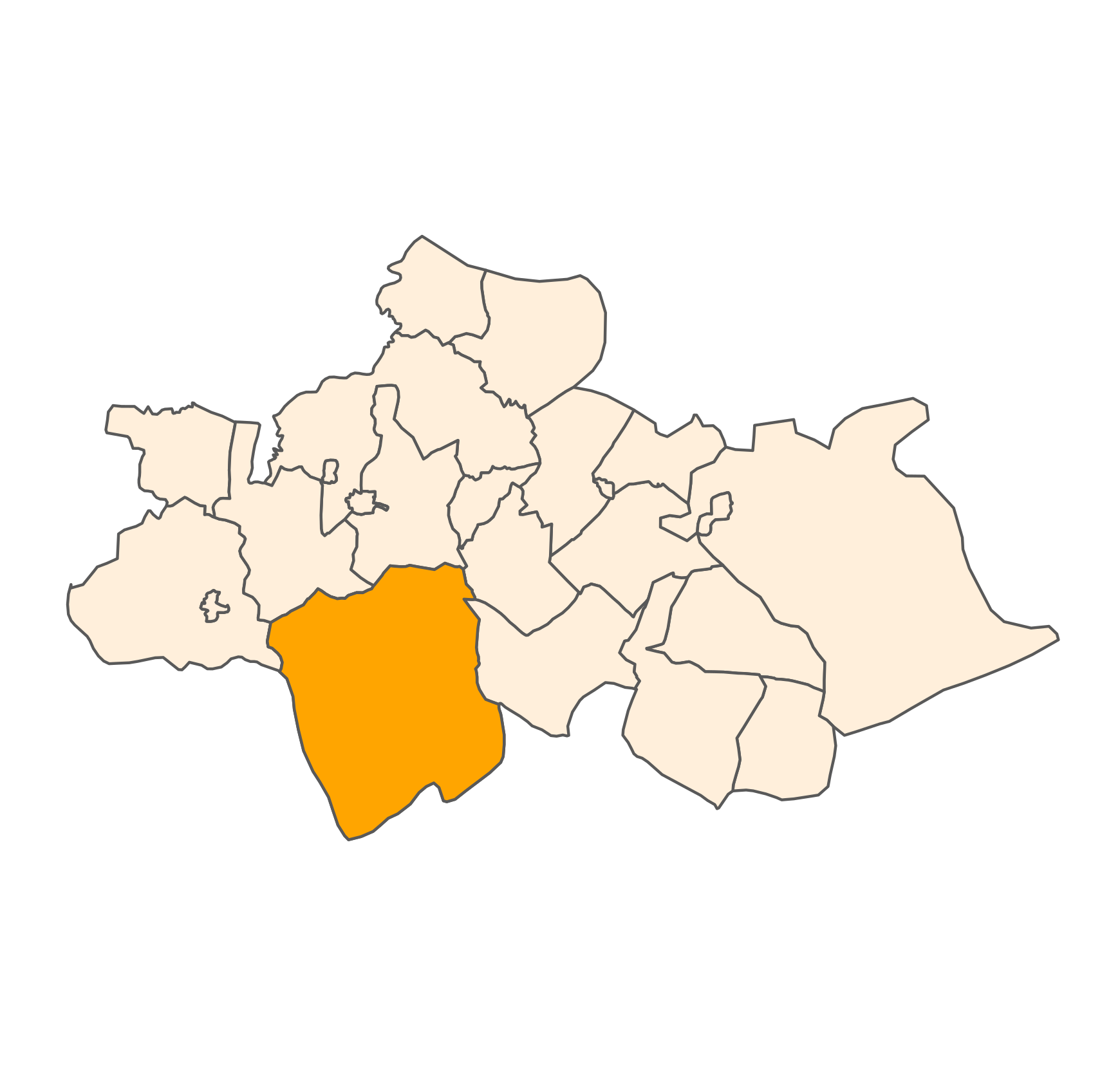
- Rural Commune of Laanoussar

- Location in Morocco
- Coordinates: 33°41′N 4°49′W
- Country: Morocco
- Region: Fès-Meknès
- Province: Sefrou

Population (2004)
  - Total: 9,343
- Time zone: UTC+0 (GMT)

Laanoussar is a commune in Sefrou Province, Fès-Meknès, Morocco. At the time of the 2004 census, the commune had a total population of 9343 people living in 1721 households.
