= Kandar Sidi Khiar =

Kandar Sidi Khiar كندر سيدي خيار
- commune
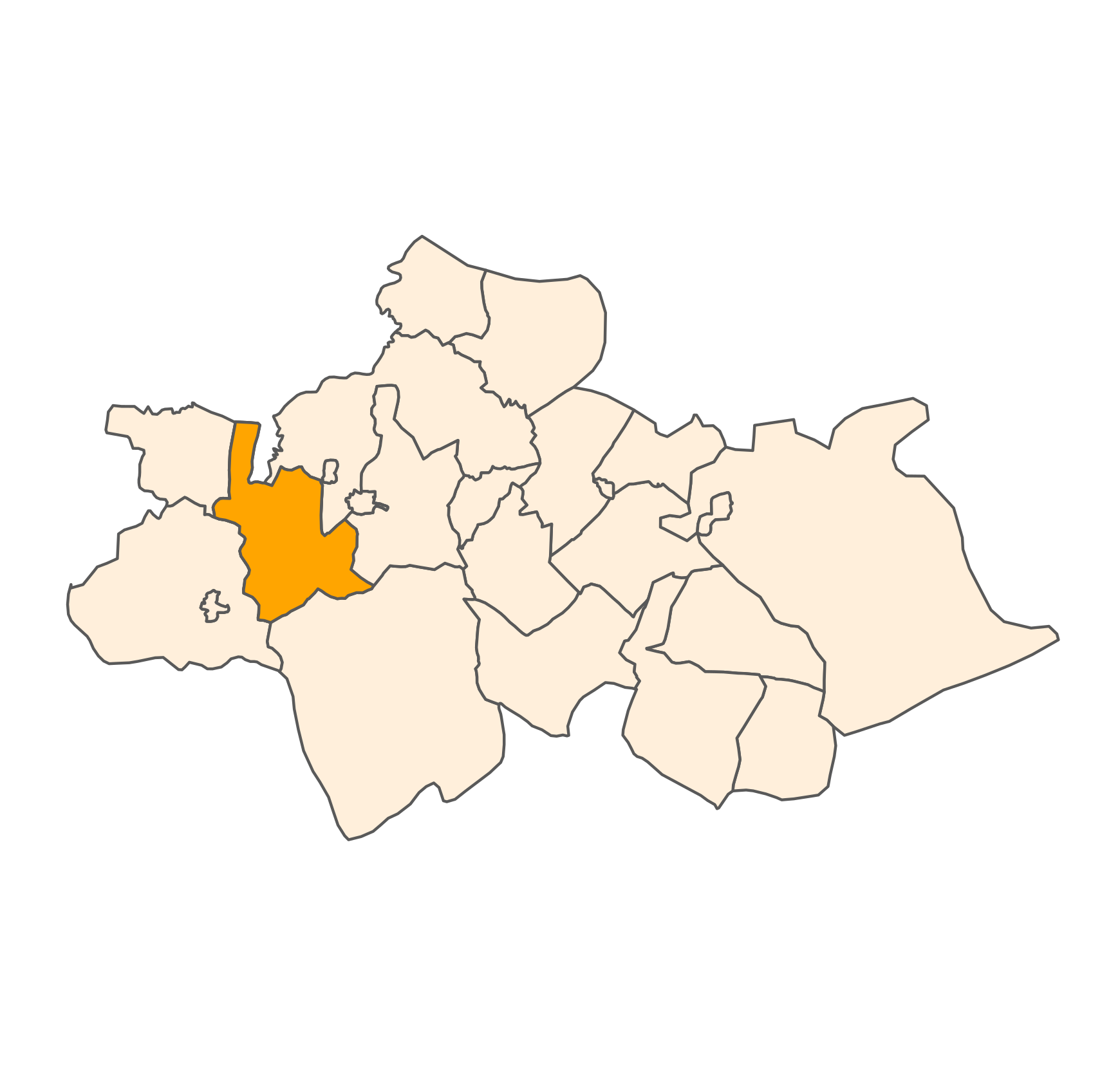
- Rural Commune of Kandar Sidi Khiar

- Location in Morocco
- Coordinates: 33.7784°N 4.9593°W
- Country: Morocco
- Region: Fès-Meknès
- Province: Sefrou

Population (2004)
  - Total: 8,709
- Time zone: UTC+0 (GMT)

Kandar Sidi Khiar is a commune in Sefrou Province, Fès-Meknès, Morocco. At the time of the 2004 census, the commune had a total population of 8709 people living in 1429 households.
