= Ain Timguenai =

- commune
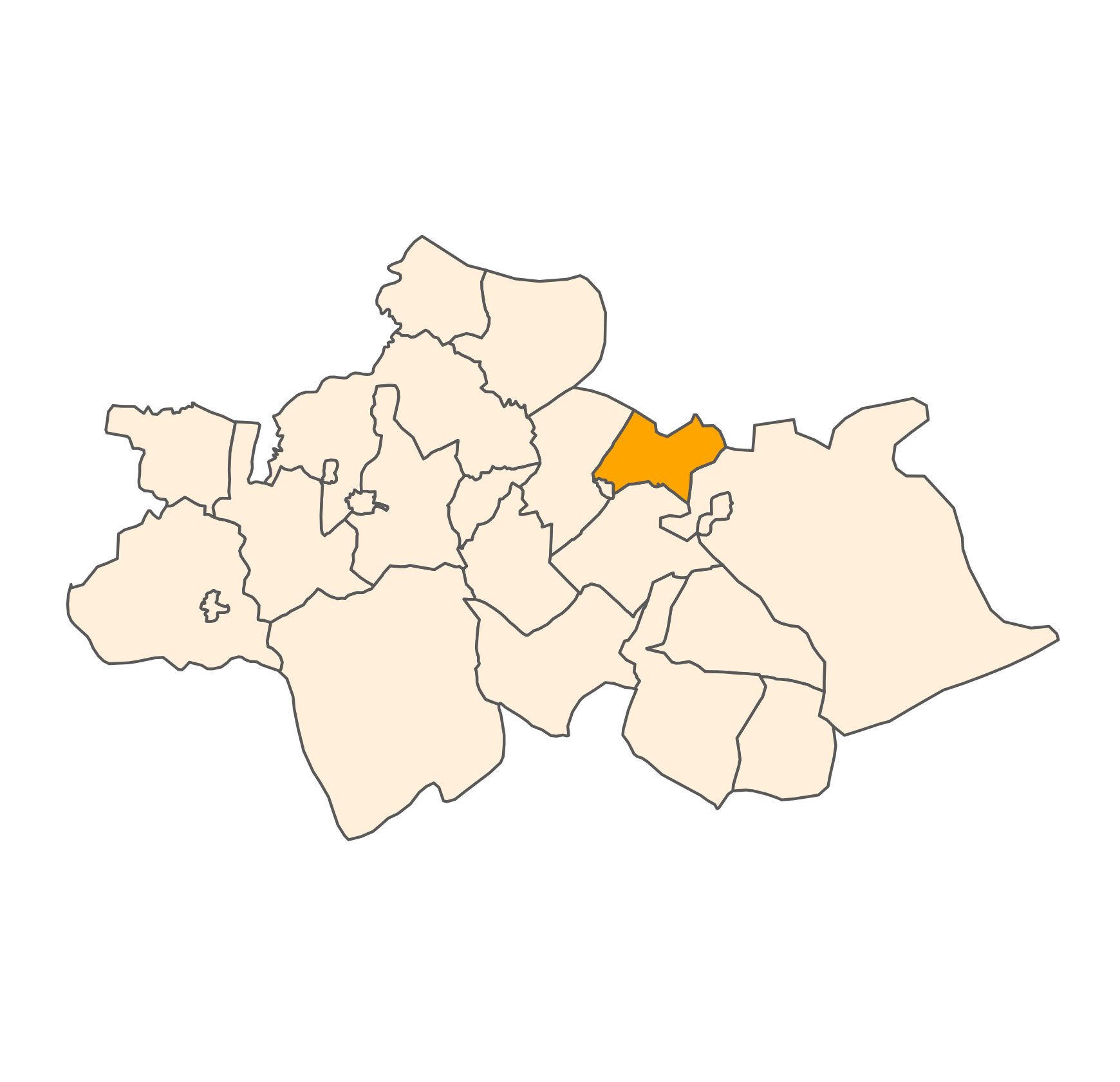
- Rural Commune of Zaouiat Bougrine
- Coordinates: 33.8550°N 4.4887°W
- Country: Morocco
- Region: Fès-Meknès
- Province: Sefrou

Population (2004)
  - Total: 5,778
- Time zone: UTC+0 (GMT)

Ain Timguenai is a commune in Sefrou Province, Fès-Meknès, Morocco. At the time of the 2004 census, the commune had a total population of 5778 people living in 1087 households.
