= Sidi Youssef Ben Ahmed =

Sidi Youssef Ben Ahmed سيدي يوسف بن أحمد
- commune
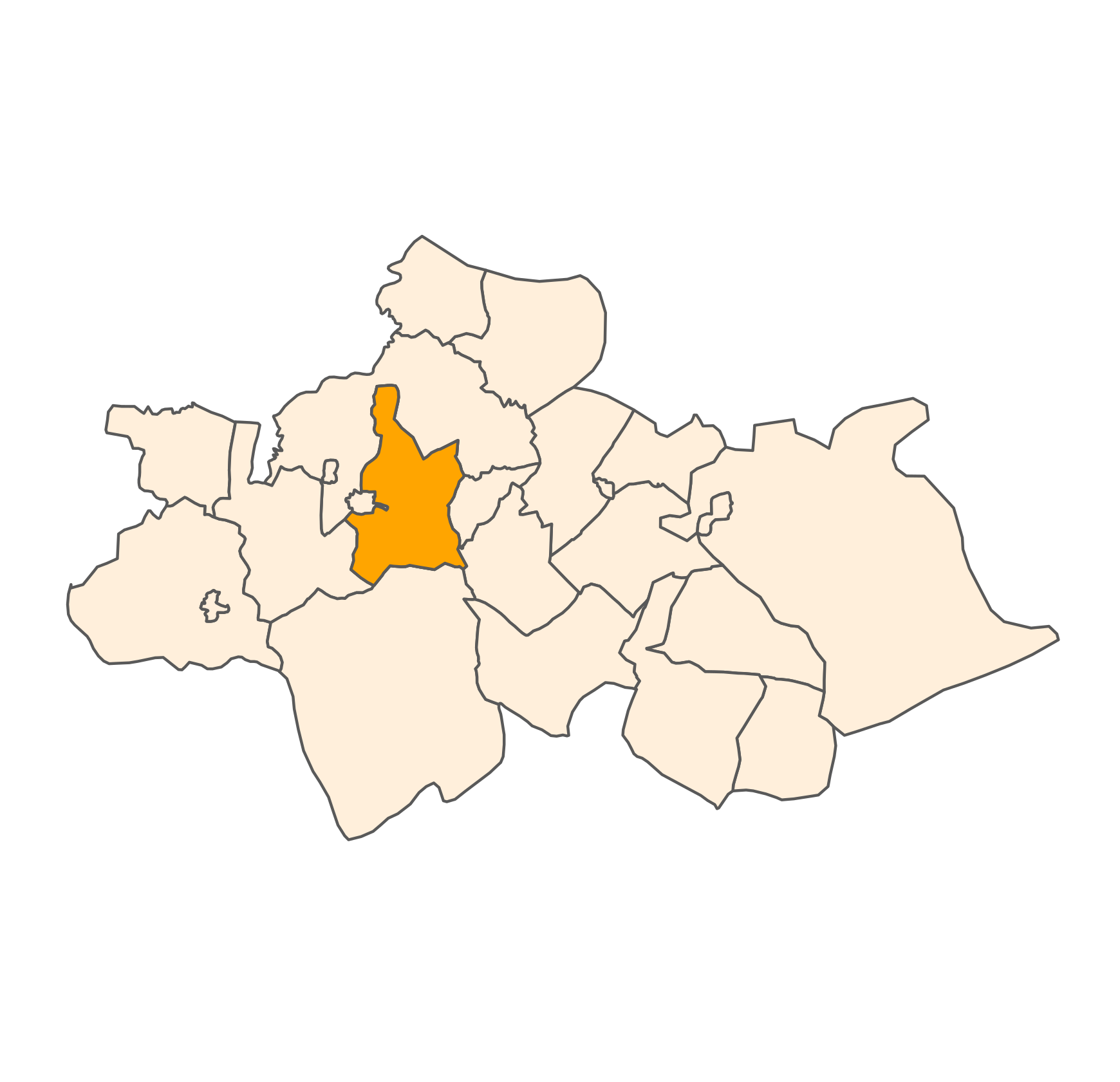
- Sidi Youssef Ben Ahmed

- Location in Morocco
- Coordinates: 33.7861°N 4.8152°W
- Country: Morocco
- Region: Fès-Meknès
- Province: Sefrou

Population (2004)
  - Total: 11,292
- Time zone: UTC+0 (GMT)

Sidi Youssef Ben Ahmed is a commune in Sefrou Province, Fès-Meknès, Morocco. At the time of the 2004 census, the commune had a total population of 11,292 people living in 2,218 households.
