= Ahermoumou =

Ahermoumou أهرمومو / ⴰⵀⵔⵎⴻⵎⵎⵓ Ribate El Kheir
- Town
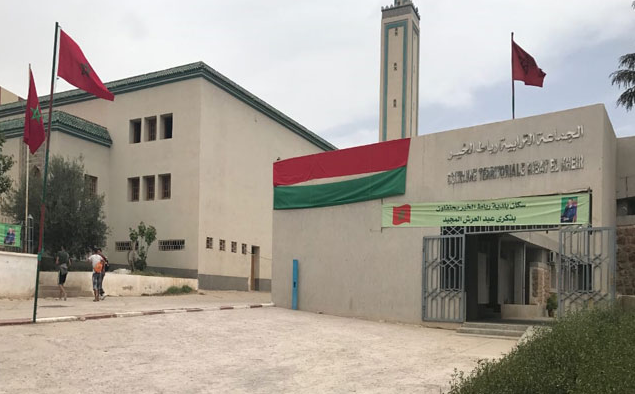

- Location in Morocco
- Coordinates: 33°49′6.19″N 4°24′38.27″W
- Country: Morocco
- Region: Fès-Meknès
- Province: Sefrou Province
- Elevation: 4,100 ft (1,250 m)

Population (2004)
  - Total: 12,654
- Time zone: UTC+0 (GMT)

Ahermoumou (Tamazight: ⴰⵀⵔⵎⴻⵎⵎⵓ) (Arabic: أهرمومو), known officially as Ribate El Kheir (Arabic: رباط الخير), is a town in Sefrou Province, Fès-Meknès, Morocco. According to the 2004 Moroccan census it had a population of 12,654.

Ahermoumou is notable for housing the Royal Military Training Academy (formerly the Non-Commissioned Officers School of Ahermoumou), whose commander and cadets were implicated in the 1971 Moroccan coup attempt. Following the unsuccessful coup, King Hassan II officially renamed the town Ribate El Kheir; both names, however, remain in use.
