= Sefrou Province =

Coordinates: 33°49′N 4°51′W

Sefrou Province إقليم صفرو ⵜⴰⵙⴳⴰ ⵏ ⵚⴼⵕⵓ
- Province
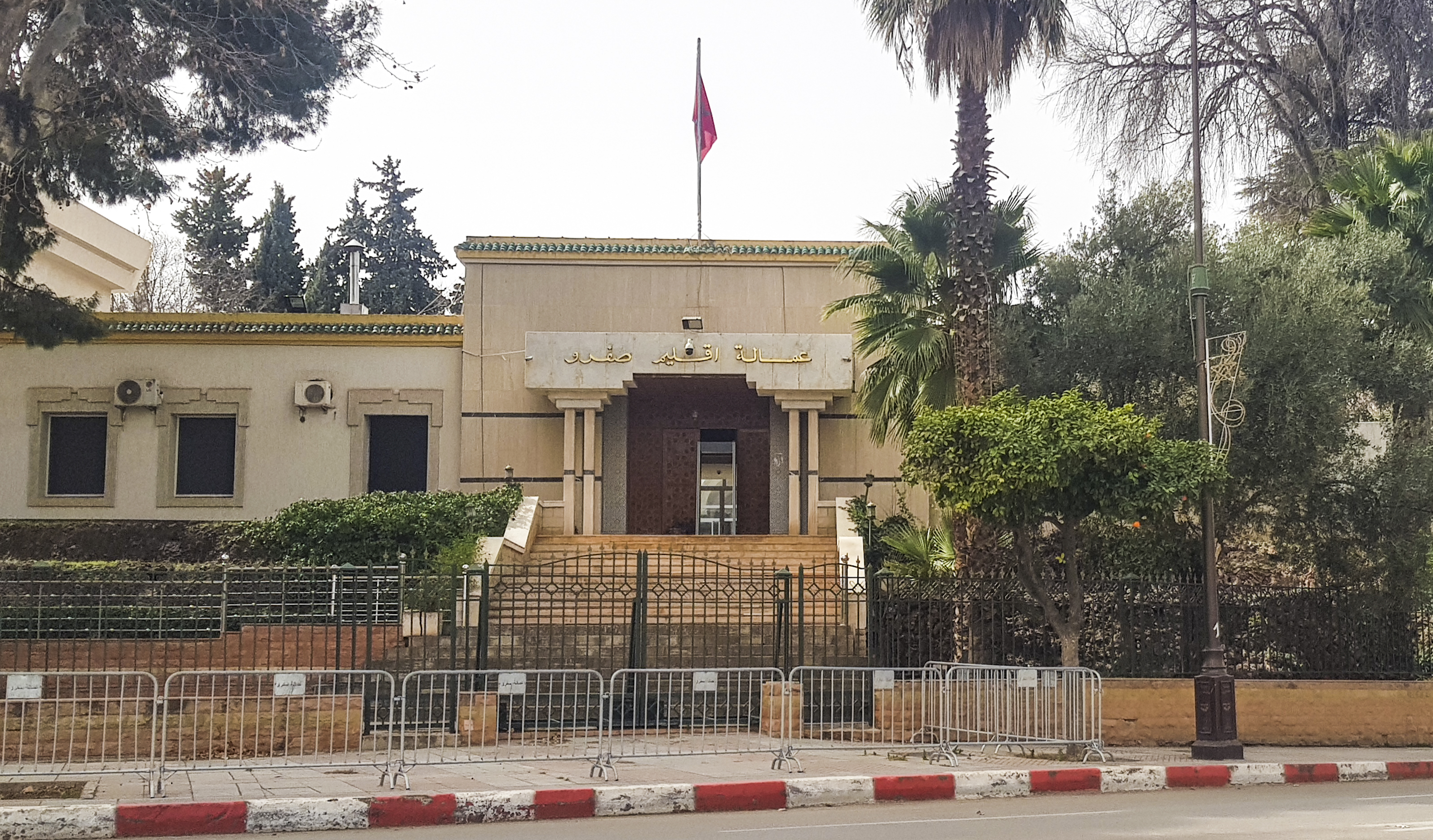

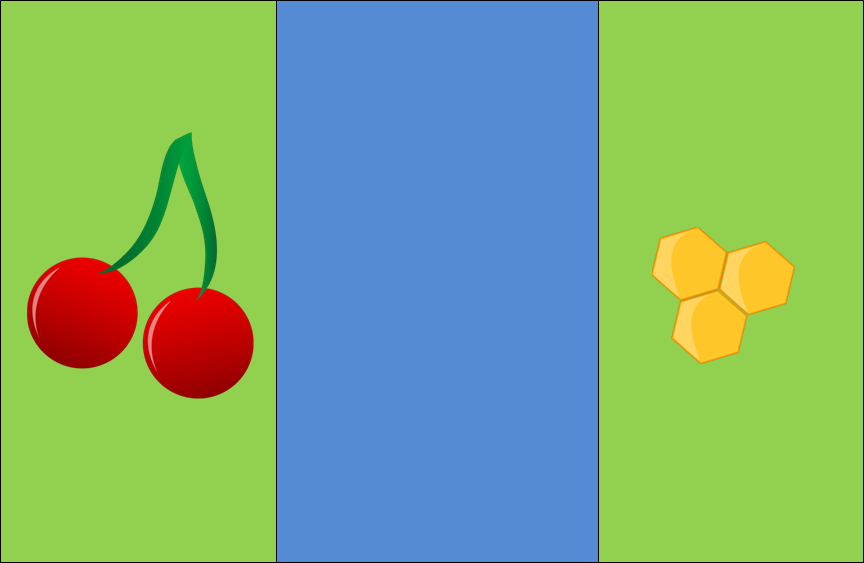
- Flag Seal
- Interactive map of Sefrou Province
- Country: Morocco
- Region: Fès-Meknès
- Seat: Sefrou

Population (2024)
  - Total: 304,748

Sefrou Province is an administrative province in northern Morocco, located in the Fès-Meknès region. Its capital is the city of Sefrou. The province forms a transitional area between the Saïss plain and the foothills of the Middle Atlas.

== Geography ==
Sefrou Province lies southeast of Fes and covers a diverse landscape that includes plains, hills, and mountainous areas. The northern part of the province is more open and agricultural, while the southern areas rise toward the Middle Atlas, featuring forests and higher elevations.

The climate is generally Mediterranean, with cooler conditions in the upland areas. Seasonal rivers and natural springs contribute to agricultural activity and local settlement patterns.

Key towns in the province include Sefrou, El Menzel, Bhalil, Imouzzer Kandar, and Ribate El Kheir.

== History ==
The region around Sefrou has long served as a link between lowland agricultural zones and mountain communities of the Middle Atlas. The city of Sefrou is known for its historical medina and cultural traditions, reflecting a mix of influences over time.

The province was established as part of Morocco’s administrative framework to support local governance and regional development.

== Economy ==
The economy is largely based on agriculture, including cereal farming, fruit cultivation, and livestock raising. The varied terrain allows for different types of agricultural activity, particularly in valleys and upland areas.

Local commerce and services are concentrated in urban centers, especially in the city of Sefrou. The province also has potential for tourism, supported by its natural landscapes and cultural heritage.

== Administrative divisions ==
Communes of Sefrou Province

Sefrou Province is divided into several municipalities and rural communes, organized into administrative circles. The main urban municipalities include:

- Sefrou
- El Menzel
- Bhalil
- Imouzzer Kandar
- Ribate El Kheir

These towns serve as administrative and economic hubs for the surrounding rural areas.

The province is divided administratively into the following:

Name	Geographic code	Type	Households	Population (2004)	Foreign population	Moroccan population	Notes
Bhalil	451.01.01.	Municipality	2815	11638	6	11632	
El Menzel	451.01.03.	Municipality	2476	11484	3	11481	
Imouzzer Kandar	451.01.05.	Municipality	3025	13745	18	13727	
Ribate El Kheir	451.01.07.	Municipality	2619	12654	0	12654	
Sefrou	451.01.09.	Municipality	14344	64006	28	63978	
Adrej	451.03.01.	Rural commune	479	2236	0	2236	
Ain Timguenai	451.03.03.	Rural commune	1087	5778	1	5777	3570 residents live in the center, called Zaouiat Bougrine; 2208 residents live in rural areas.
Bir Tam Tam	451.03.05.	Rural commune	1818	9714	1	9713	
Dar El Hamra	451.03.07.	Rural commune	841	4022	1	4021	
Ighzrane	451.03.09.	Rural commune	2064	11050	0	11050	
Mtarnagha	451.03.11.	Rural commune	982	5284	0	5284	
Oulad Mkoudou	451.03.13.	Rural commune	1523	7821	0	7821	
Ras Tabouda	451.03.15.	Rural commune	1202	6516	2	6514	
Tafajight	451.03.17.	Rural commune	330	2047	0	2047	
Ain Cheggag	451.05.01.	Rural commune	2737	15475	21	15454	4436 residents live in the center, called Ain Cheggag; 11039 residents live in rural areas.
Ait Sebaa Lajrouf	451.05.03.	Rural commune	3138	17400	0	17400	
Aghbalou Aqorar	451.07.01.	Rural commune	3044	15835	1	15834	
Ahl Sidi Lahcen	451.07.03.	Rural commune	993	5290	0	5290	
Azzaba	451.07.05.	Rural commune	515	2493	1	2492	
Kandar Sidi Khiar	451.07.07.	Rural commune	1429	8709	0	8709	
Laanoussar	451.07.09.	Rural commune	1721	9343	0	9343	
Sidi Youssef Ben Ahmed	451.07.11.	Rural commune	2218	11292	0	11292	
Tazouta	451.07.13.	Rural commune	1098	5745	0	5745	
