= Sefrou =

Town in Fès-Meknès, Morocco

Sefrou: Arabic: صفرو; Standard Moroccan Tamazight: ⵚⴼⵕⵓ
- City
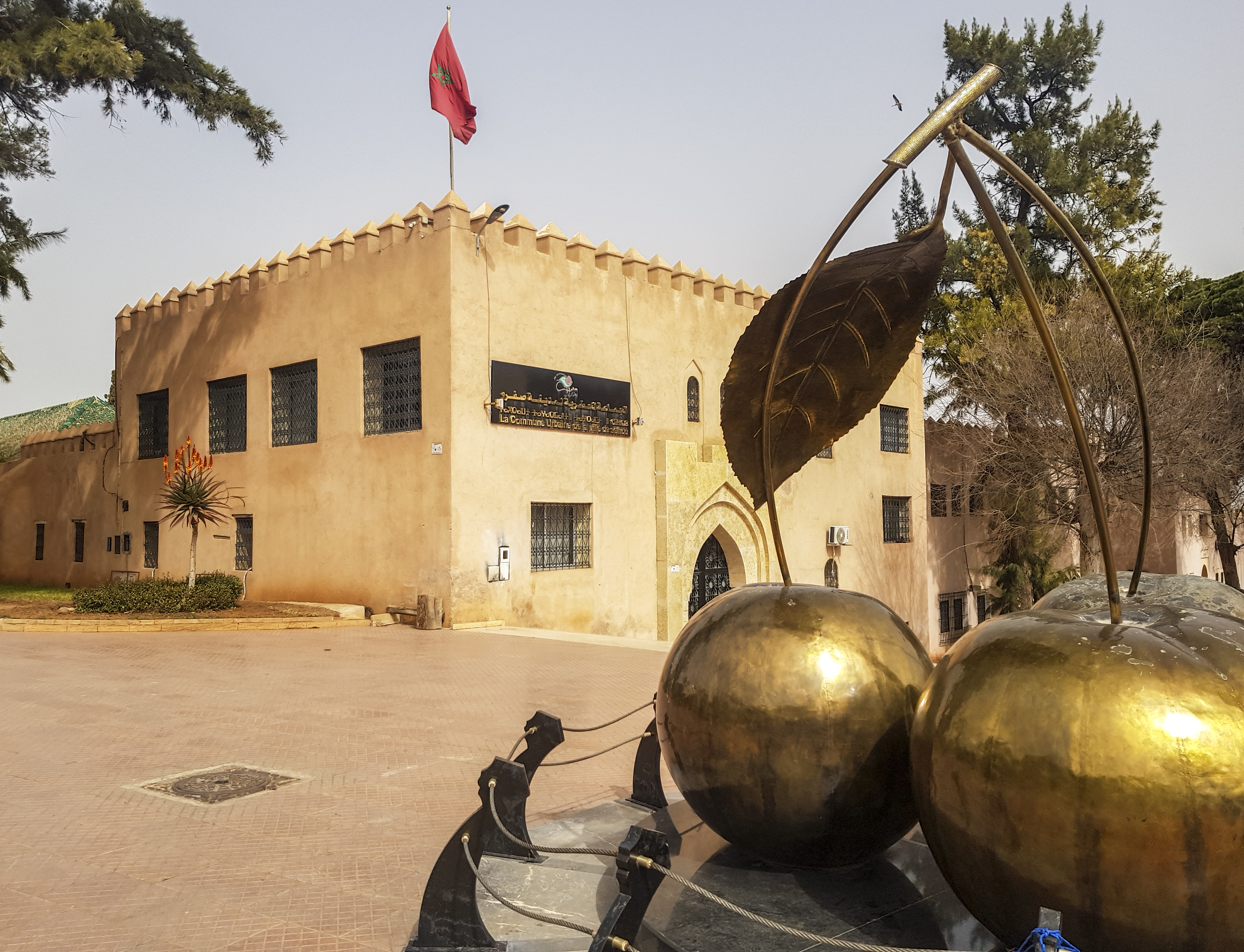
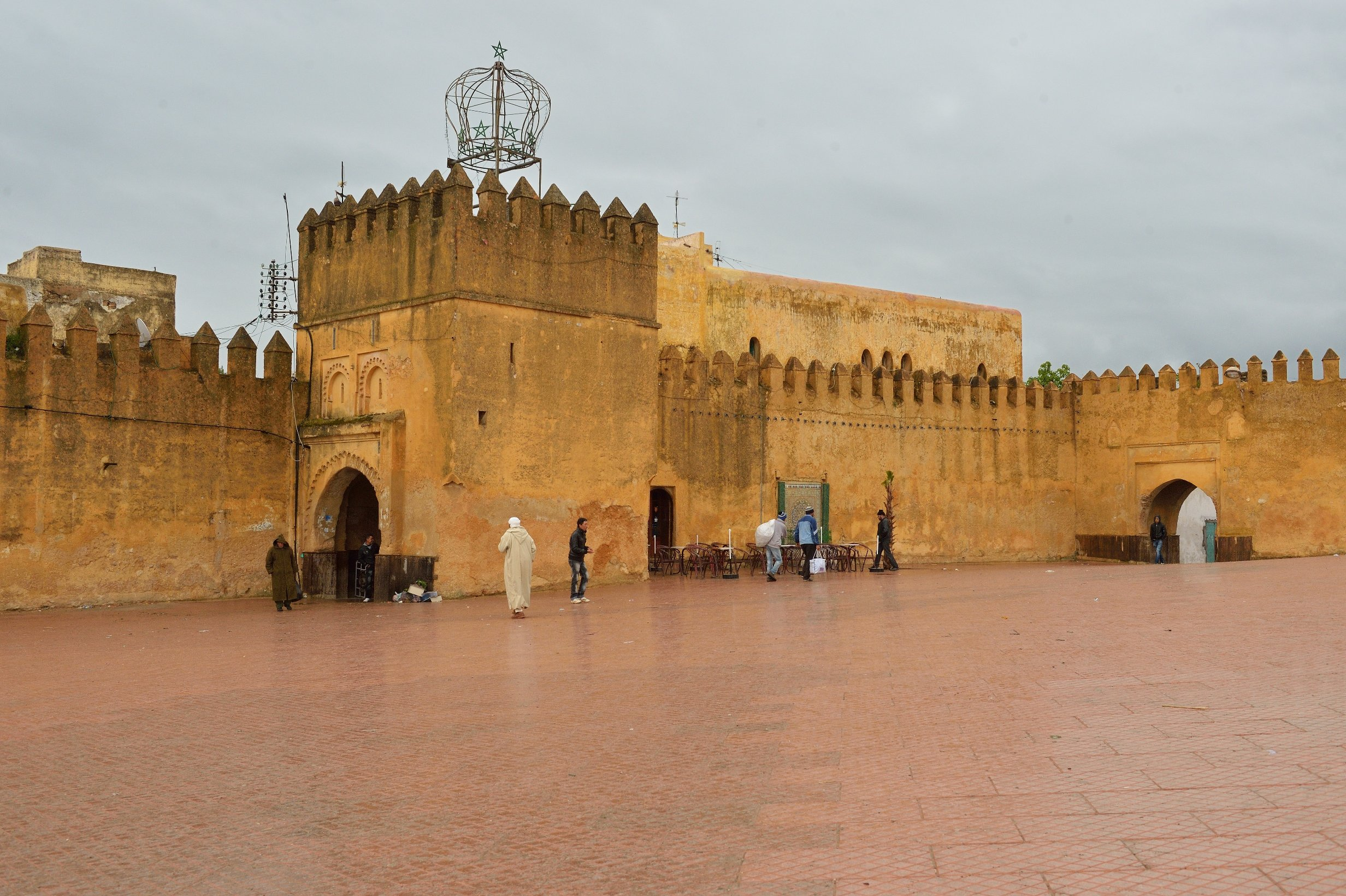
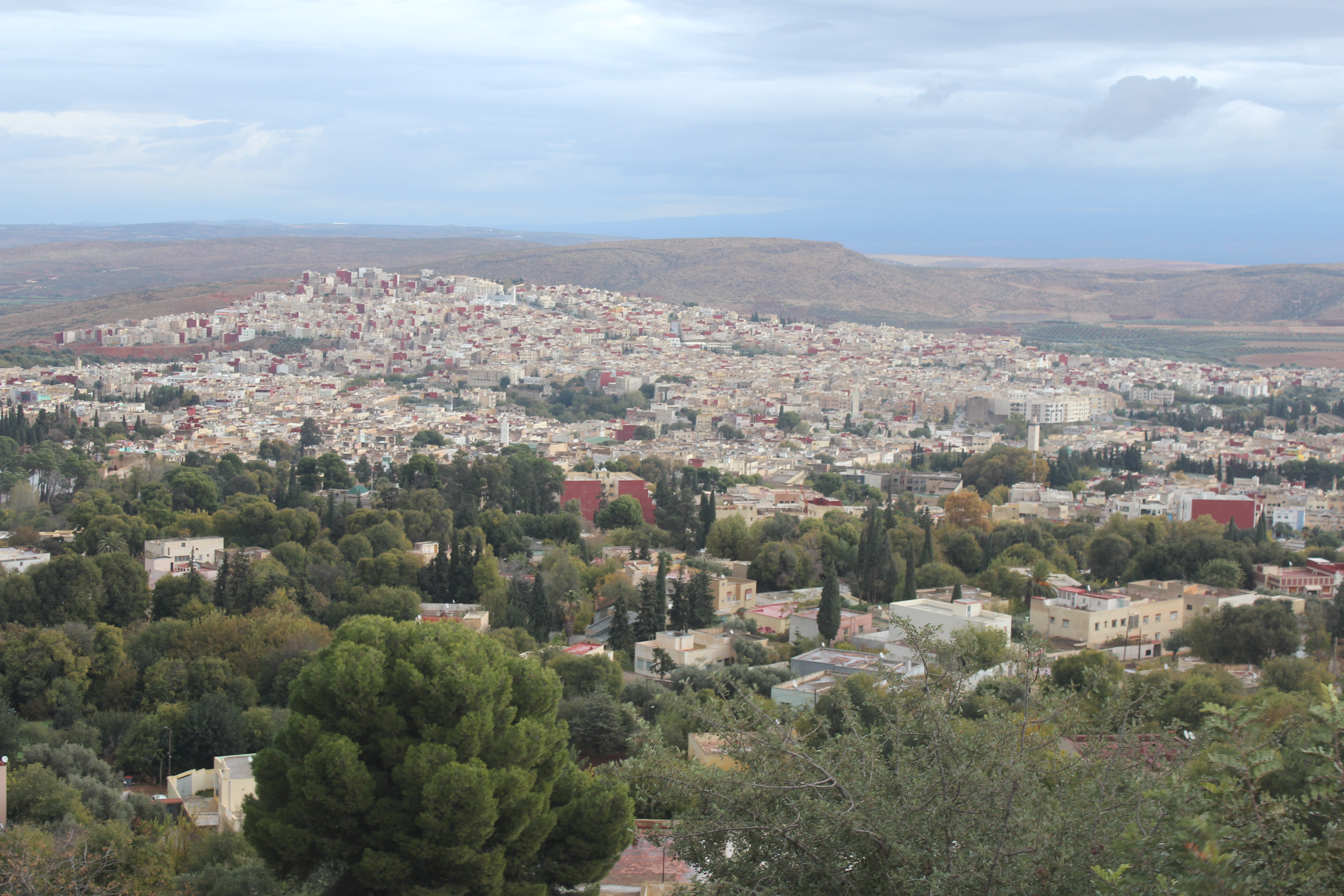
- Nickname: Tilmirath
- Interactive map of Sefrou
- Coordinates: 33°49′41.564″N 4°49′49.057″W
- Country: Morocco
- Region: Fès-Meknès
- Province: Sefrou

Area
  - Total: 10.50 km^{2} (4.05 sq mi)
- Elevation: 850 m (2,790 ft)

Population (2024)
  - Total: 86,903
  - Density: 8,276/km^{2} (21,440/sq mi)
- Demonym: Sefrioui
- Time zone: UTC+0 (GMT)

Sefrou (Arabic: صفرو, romanized: Ṣefrū; Standard Moroccan Tamazight: ⵚⴼⵕⵓ, romanized: Ṣefṛu) is a city in central Morocco situated in the Fès-Meknès region. It is the capital and namesake for Sefrou Province.

It recorded a population of 86,903 in the 2024 Moroccan census.

Sefrou is known for its Jewish heritage, and its annual cherry festival.

== History ==
Sefrou was named for the Ahel Sefrou, a Berber tribe that once inhabited the area.

Sefrou's name might be brought from the berber name "Asfru" (ⴰⵙⴼⵔⵓ) which means "the solution" (in Amazigh).

Sefrou was once home to one of the largest settlements of Moroccan Jews, the population estimated to have been as high as 8,000. The first Jewish people lived in the area of the Ahel Sefrou, most of whom were converted to Judaism around 2,000 years ago. In the 8th century, most of these were converted to Islam under Idris I of Morocco. In the 9th century, a second Jewish population settled from the Tafilalt area and Southern Algeria. Most of the descendants of these Jews stayed in Sefrou until 1967, when many moved to Israel.

Idris II of Morocco lived in Sefrou temporarily while overseeing the development of Fez.

On October 10, 1946, an Amiot AAC.1 (F-BCAA) of Air Ocean crashed into a cliff at 3,600 feet 6.3 miles (10 km) south the city, killing all 16 onboard.

== Geography ==
Sefrou is located at the edge of the Middle Atlas mountain range, and is 30 kilometres (19 mi) southeast of Fez. Oued Aggai runs through the city, and about 1.5 kilometres (0.93 mi) west of Sefrou are the Cascades, a small waterfall. Wadi Aggai also takes part in irrigation for the area. The Kef el-Moumen caves contain ancient tombs, one of which is claimed to be the tomb of Daniel. There is also a spring near Sefrou called Lalla Rekia, which is purported to cure insanity.

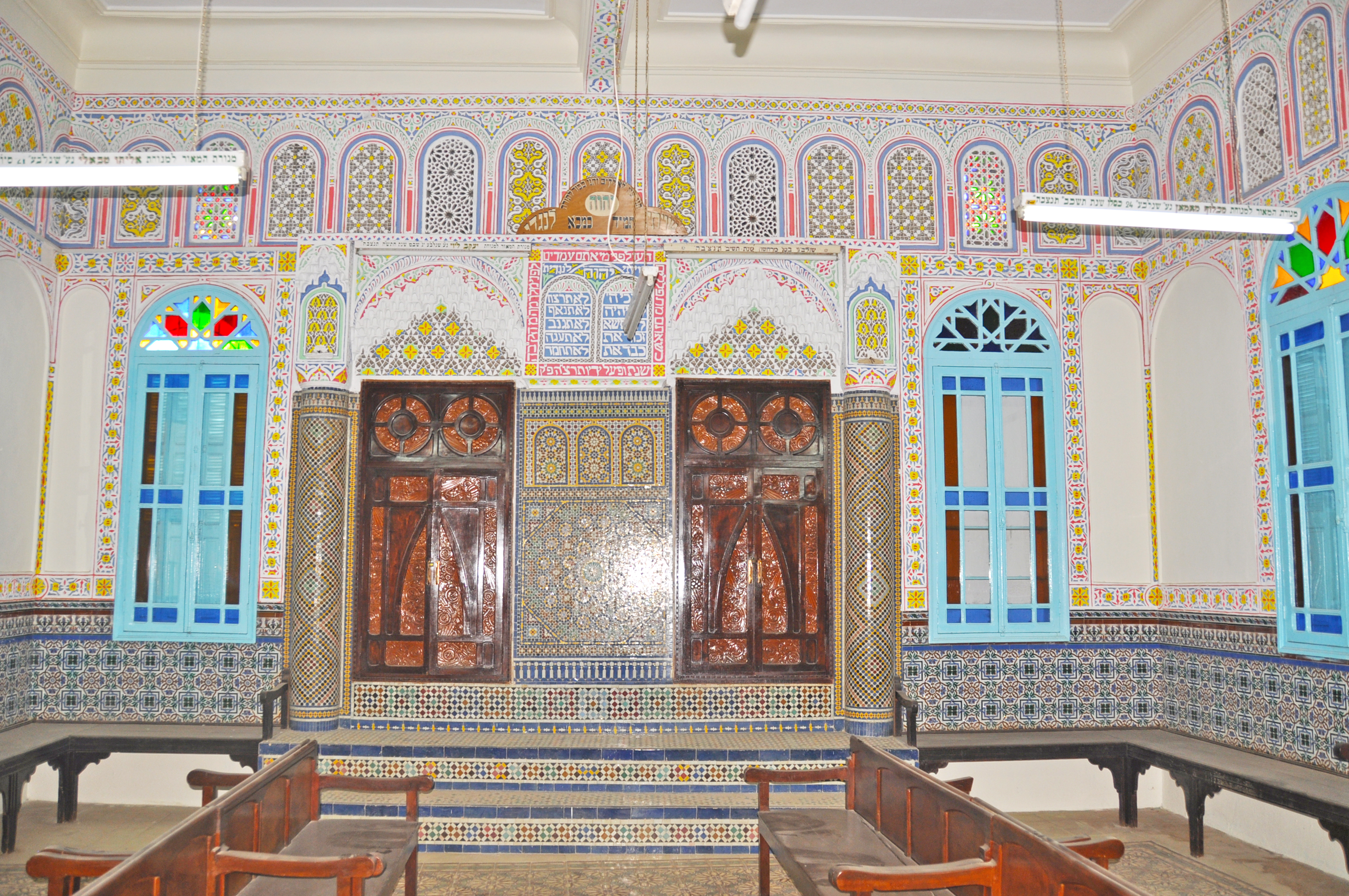
A synagogue in Sefrou

== Culture ==
Sefrou is known for its Sefrou Cherry Festival, which is UNESCO-endorsed, and is held annually every June. This festival, originally launched back in 1920, consists in a beauty contest in which Moroccan women would apply for the prestigious title of Miss Cherry. The festival lasts for three days and includes folk music, Moroccan traditional cuisine, fantasia performances, and sporting events.

The town has a medina and two mosques, and every Thursday is market day.
