= Fez-Meknes =

Region of Morocco

Fez-Meknes Region جهة فاس مكناس (Arabic) ⵜⴰⵎⵏⴰⴹⵜ ⵏ ⴼⴰⵙ - ⵎⴽⵏⴰⵙ (Standard Moroccan Tamazight)
- Region
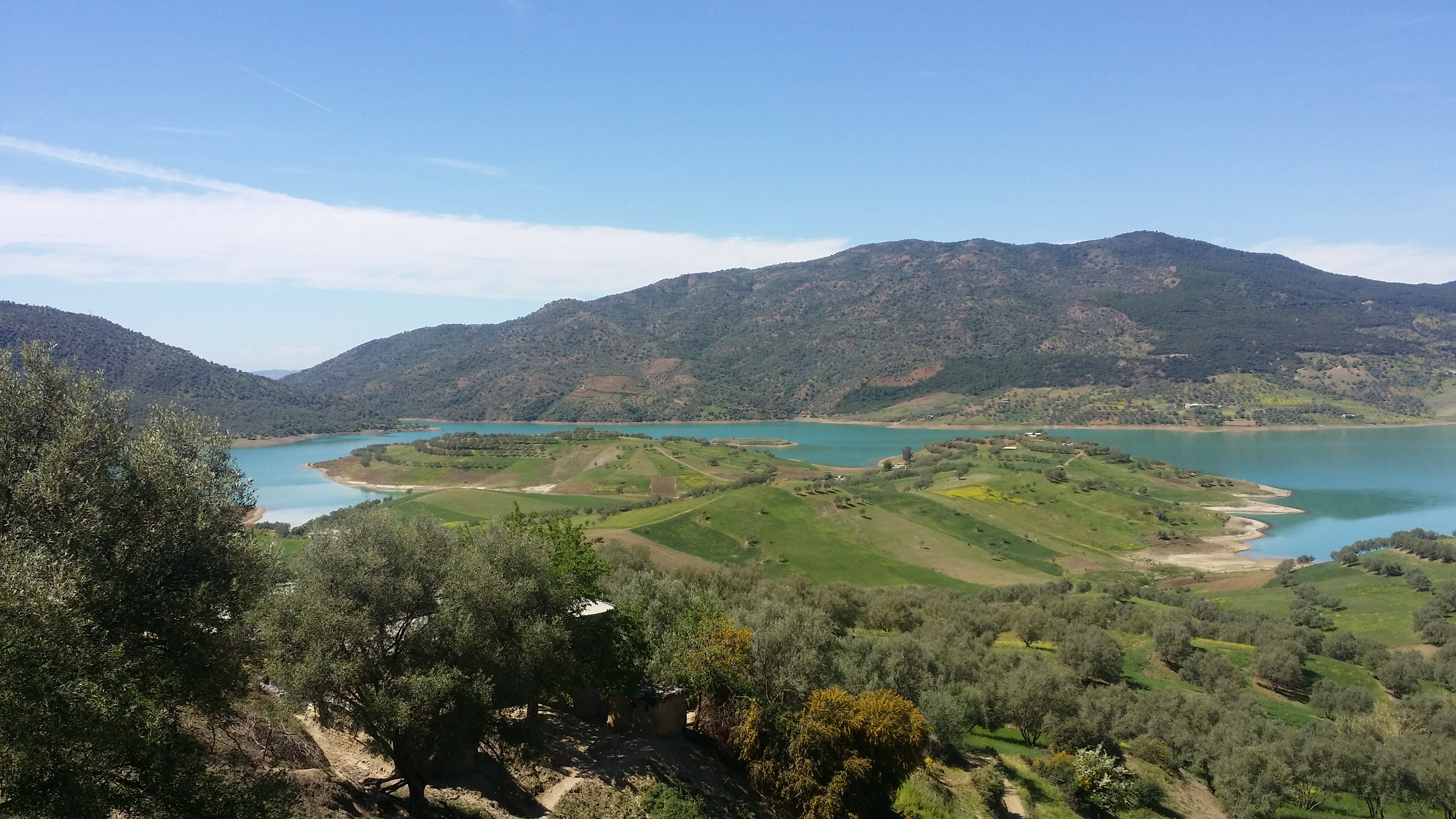

- Seal

- Location in Morocco
- Coordinates: 34°02′N 5°0′W
- Country: Morocco
- Capital: Fez

Government
  - Wali: Khalid Aït Taleb
  - President: Abdelouhed El Ansari (PI)

Area
  - Total: 38,881.5 km^{2} (15,012.2 sq mi)

Population (2024)
  - Total: 4,467,911
  - Rank: 4th out of 12 regions
  - Density: 114.911/km^{2} (297.618/sq mi)
- Time zone: UTC+0 (GMT)
- ISO 3166 code: MA-03

Fez-Meknes (Note: Arabic: فاس - مكناس Standard Moroccan Tamazight: ⴼⴰⵙ - ⵎⴽⵏⴰⵙ) is one of the twelve administrative regions of Morocco. Located in the north-central part of the country, it is known for its cultural and historical heritage, spiritual importance, and growing modern economy. The regional capital is Fez. Its current president is Abdelouhed El Ansari, and its current wali (governor) is Khalid Aït Taleb.

Fez-Meknes lies between the Rif Mountains in the north and the Middle Atlas Mountains in the south. The landscape includes fertile plains, forests, and mountain ranges. Major rivers include the Sebou, Inaouen, and Ouergha.

The region experiences a Mediterranean climate in the plains and a continental mountain climate in the highlands. It is home to the Ifrane National Park and Tazekka National Park.

== History ==
Fez-Meknes was formed in September 2015 by merging Fès-Boulemane with the prefecture of Meknès and the provinces of El Hajeb and Ifrane (in Meknès-Tafilalet region) and the provinces of Taounate and Taza (in Taza-Al Hoceima-Taounate region).

Following the 2021 regional elections, Abdelouahed El Ansari, a member of the Istiqlal Party, was elected president of the regional council.

On 19 October 2025, Khalid Aït Taleb was appointed Wali of the Fès-Meknès region and Governor of the Fès prefecture by King Mohammed VI, during a Council of Ministers meeting in Rabat.

== Government ==
Provinces of Fez-Meknes

=== Administrative divisions ===
Fez-Meknes is divided into two prefectures and seven provinces:

Province or Prefecture	Geographic code	ISO code	HASC Code	Surfacekm^{2}	Number of municipalities or arrondissement	Number of rural communes	Population 2024
Fez Prefecture	03.231.	MA-FES	MA.FM.FS	311.5	6	3	1,256,172
Meknès Prefecture	03.061.	MA-MEK	MA.FM.ME	1,787	6	15	942,945
Taounate Province	03.531.	MA-TAO	MA.FM.TN	5,598	5	44	612,650
Taza Province	03.561.	MA-TAZ	MA.FM.TZ	6,097	4	34	500,971
Sefrou Province	03.451.	MA-SEF	MA.FM.SE	3,462	5	18	304,748
El Hajeb Province	03.171.	MA-HAJ	MA.FM.EH	2,135	4	12	267,156
Moulay Yacoub Province	03.591.	MA-MOU	MA.FM.ZM	1,480	1	10	216,954
Boulemane Province	03.131.	MA-BOM	MA.FM.BO	14,234	4	17	205,411
Ifrane Province	03.271.	MA-IFR	MA.FM.IF	3,777	2	8	160,904

=== Regional leadership ===
Wali of Fez-Meknes since 2015
Name	Duration	Under
Said Zniber	2015–2023	King Mohammed VI
Mouadh El Jamai	2023–2025	King Mohammed VI
Khalid Aït Taleb	2025–present	King Mohammed VI

Regional Council Presidents of Fez-Meknes since 2015
Name	Duration	Party	Under
Mohand Laenser	2015–2021	MP	King Mohammed VI
Abdelouahed El Ansari	2021–present	PI	King Mohammed VI

== Demographics ==
The region's population is ethnically diverse, consisting of Arab and Berbers communities. Both Arabic and Berber languages are spoken. Approximately 62% of the population lives in urban areas.

== Climate and terrain ==
The region's terrain is characterized by the diversity of its constituent natural features: the Saïss, the Pre-Rif hills to the north, the Middle Atlas ranges, and the high hills of the Missour area. This topographical variety results in contrasting climatic conditions across the different sectors.
