= Hayat =

Hayat or Hayet is an Arabic word which means "life".

== People ==
=== Given name ===
- Hayat Abdullayeva (1912–2006), Azerbaijani sculptor
- Hayat Ahmed (born 1982), Ethiopian model
- Hayat Alyaqout (born 1981), Kuwaiti writer
- Hayat Ansari (born 1997), Indian cricketer
- Hayat Bakshi Begum (died 1667), royal consort
- Hayat Boumeddiene (born 1988), common law wife of Amedy Coulibaly, who perpetrated the Montrouge shooting in France in 2015
- Hayat Ali Shah Bukhari (1949–2020), Pakistani film artist, dramatist, and film director
- Hayat Al-Fahad (1948–2026), Kuwaiti actress
- Hayat El Garaa (born 1996), Moroccan para-athlete
- Hayat El Ghazi (born 1979), Moroccan hammer thrower
- Hayat Kabasakal, Turkish management academic
- Hayat Ahmad Khan (1921–2005), Pakistani musicologist
- Hayat Lambarki (born 1988), Moroccan hurdler
- Hayat Mahmud, Bengali feudal lord and military commander
- Hayat Mamud (born 1939), Bangladeshi essayist-poet
- Hayat Mirshad (born 1988), Lebanese feminist journalist and activist
- Hayat Saif (1942–2019), Bengali poet and literary critic
- Hayat Sharara (1935–1997), Iraqi writer, translator, and educator
- Hayat Sherpao (1937–1975), Pakistani politician
- Hayat Sindi (born 1967), Saudi Arabian biotechnologist
- Hayat Toubal (born 1985), Algerian chess player
- Heyat Mahmud (1693–1760), medieval Bengali poet

=== Middle name ===
- Aamir Hayat Khan Rokhri (1956–2011), Pakistani politician
- Adnan Hayat Noon, Pakistani politician
- Akhtar Hayat Gandapur, Pakistani police officer
- Ayn al-Hayat Ahmad (1858–1910), Egyptian princess
- Hassan Azhar Hayat Khan, Pakistani general
- Khizar Hayat Tiwana (1900–1975), British Indian statesman
- Muhammad Hayat Khan (1833–1901), British Indian landlord, politician, and author
- Raza Hayat Hiraj (born 1965), Pakistani politician
- Shaukat Hayat Khan (1915–1998), Pakistani politician and military officer
- Sikandar Hayat Khan (1892–1942), British Indian politician
- Sikandar Hayat Khan (Azad Kashmir politician) (1934–2021), Pakistani politician
- Yawar Hayat Khan (1943–2016), Pakistani television producer

=== Surname ===
- Abdul Hayat (born 1944), Bangladeshi actor
- Ahsan Saleem Hayat (born 1948), Pakistani general
- Amir Hayat (born 1982), Emirati cricketer
- Anupam Hayat, Bangladeshi film critic
- Bipasha Hayat (born 1971), Bangladeshi actress
- Faisal Saleh Hayat (born 1952), Pakistani politician
- Hamid and Umer Hayat, Pakistani-American terrorists
- Kazi Hayat (born 1947/48), Bangladeshi actor and director
- Khizar Hayat (born 1989), Pakistani-born Malaysian cricketer
- Khizer Hayat (1939–2025), Pakistani cricketer and umpire
- Khizir Hayat (born 1967), Bangladeshi judge
- Mahmood Hayat (born 1981), Pakistani artist and teacher
- Malik Asif Hayat, chairman of the Federal Public Service Commission of Pakistan
- Mehwish Hayat (born 1988), Pakistani actress
- Muhammad Umar Hayat (born 1996), Pakistani footballer
- Rana Muhammad Hayat (born 1950), Pakistani politician
- Shaukat Hayat (1950–2021), Indian writer
- Sofia Hayat (born 1974), British-Indian model and actress
- Zafar Hayat (born 1927), Pakistani field hockey player
- Zubair Mahmood Hayat (born 1960), Pakistani general
- Mozammil Hayat (born 2005),Indian Writer

== Places ==
- Hayat, Algeria, a city in Algeria
- Həyat, a village in Kalbajar Rayon, Azerbaijan
- Menzel Hayet, a town and commune in the Monastir Governorate, Tunisia
- Seyyed Ramazan, also known as Hāyeţ, a village in Khuzestan Province, Iran

== Arts and media ==
=== Television ===
- Hayat TV (Bosnia and Herzegovina), a Bosnian TV network and TV channel founded in 1992
- Hayat TV (Turkey), a Turkish TV channel
- Hayat Folk, a Bosnian music TV channel dedicated to traditional "Sevdalinka" songs (founded in 2012)
- Hayat Music, a Bosnian music TV channel dedicated to world and Bosnian popular music (founded in 2012)
- Hayat Plus, a Bosnian satellite channel by Hayat TV (also known as Hayat Sat)

=== Media ===
- Al-Hayat, originally a Lebanese, then a pan-Arab newspaper
- Al-Hayat Media Center, the media wing of the Islamic State
- Hayat (newspaper), an Iranian newspaper
- Həyat, an Azerbaijani newspaper published between 1905 and 1906

== See also ==
- Hayati (disambiguation)
- Hyatt (disambiguation)
- Chait
- Chayat
- Khayat
- Al Khayat
- Hayyoth (names)
- Chaya (Hebrew given name)
- Eve (name)
