= Pir Hayati =

Pir Hayati (Persian: پیرحیاتی) may refer to:

- Pir Hayati, Hamadan
- Pir Hayati, Kermanshah
- Pir Hayati-ye Olya, Kermanshah Province
- Pir Hayati-ye Sofla, Kermanshah Province
- Pir Hayati-ye Vosta, Kermanshah Province
- Pir Hayati, Lorestan
