= Hyatt (surname) =

Hyatt is a surname that appears to have originated from England. The Oxford Dictionary of Family Names in Britain and Ireland groups Hyatt, Hyett, Hiatt, Hieatt, Hiett and Highet together.

The surname is one of several spellings that emerged from a medieval surname derived from “high gate.” It is topographic rather than occupational or patronymic surname. Unlike Smith (occupation) or Johnson (“son of John”), the name identified a person by where they lived. In medieval England that sort of description frequently became hereditary.

English: locative name denoting a dweller ‘(by the) high gate’, Middle English heigh(e), high(e) + yat(e), gat(e) (Old English hēah + geat).

Forms of the surname have been documented for more than 700 years. Recorded forms of the surname include Heghet in Lancashire in 1381, Hyette in Bristol in 1474, Hyet in London in 1514, Hyett in Worcestershire in 1539, and Hiatt in Leicester in 1599.[1] By 1881, the related Hyatt surname and its variants were particularly associated with the southwestern Midlands, including Warwickshire and Gloucestershire, as well as Somerset.

== Notable people ==
- Alpheus Hyatt (1838–1902), American naturalist and paleontologist
- Amy J. Hyatt (born 1955), American diplomat
- Art Hyatt (1912–1991), American basketball player
- Campbell C. Hyatt (1880–1945), Virginia state senator
- Charles Hyatt (1931–2007), Jamaican actor
- Charley Hyatt (1908–1978), American basketball player
- Christopher Hyatt (1943–2008), American occultist, author and founder of the Extreme Individual Institute
- Dave Hyatt (born 1972), American software engineer
- Derek Hyatt (1931–2015), British landscape painter
- Elizabeth Hyatt, American Union nurse and ambulance driver during the American Civil War
- Ham Hyatt (1884–1963), American baseball player
- Jalin Hyatt (born 2001), American football player
- James W. Hyatt (1837–1893), Connecticut state senator
- Joel Hyatt (born 1950), American businessman, attorney, and politician
- John Hyatt (minister) (1767–1826), English nonconformist pastor and missionary
- John Hyatt (musician) (died 2023), singer with The Three Johns, an English post-punk/indie rock band
- John Wesley Hyatt (1837–1920), American inventor
- Michael Hyatt, American actress
- Mitch Hyatt (born 1997), American football player
- Robert Hyatt (born 1948), American professor of computer science
- Rohail Hyatt (born 1966), Pakistani record producer, keyboardist, and composer
- Ronald Jeremy Hyatt (born 1953), American pornographic actor and stand-up comedian known as Ron Jeremy
- Stanley Portal Hyatt (1877–1914), British explorer and writer
- Terry Hyatt (born 1957), American serial killer
- Thaddeus Hyatt (1816–1901), American inventor and abolitionist
- Willard Hyatt (1883–1967), American basketball player

== Fictional characters ==
- Rashid Hyatt, in the British television series Ackley Bridge
- Tommy Hyatt, in the movie Alice Doesn't Live Here Anymore (1974) and the subsequent television series Alice (1976–85)

== See also ==
- Senator Hyatt (disambiguation)
