= Chajes =

The surnames Chajes (Ashkenazic Hebrew), Chayes, Hayyot, Hayyut, and Hiyyut are written in Hebrew characters as Hebrew: חיות. The family name originated in the Jewish community of sixteenth-century Prague, one of many such matronymic names adopted by the community in the period. It means "Chaya's [child/children]." The use of the Hebrew, rather than a Yiddish spelling, thus produced a double entendre seemingly intended to suggest "vitality".

Hebrew: חיוֹת means animals; Hebrew: חיוּת means vitality.

== People with this surname ==
- Abram Chayes (1922–2000), American legal scholar
- Benno Chajes (1880–1938), German physician and politician
- Isaac Hayyut (died 1726), Polish rabbi
- Jennifer Tour Chayes (born 1956), mathematical physicist
- Menahem Manesh Hayyut (died 1636), Polish rabbi
- Oscar Chajes (1873–1928), Austrian-American chess player
- Sarah Chayes (born 1962), American journalist
- Zvi Hirsch Chajes (1805–1855), Galician rabbi
- Zwi Perez Chajes (1876–1927), Austrian rabbi
- J. H. Chajes (born 1965), Israeli-American professor of Jewish thought

== See also ==
- Chai (symbol)
- Chayyim (Haim) (pl.)
- Chayyey (Hebrew: חַיֵּי); e.g. Chayei Sarah
- Surnamed people Chaitin, (Galith) Chayyat', Chayat are from Chayyat' / Khayat / Chait, a tailor (cf.Schneider/Shreyder)
