= Tazehnab =

Tazehnab or Tazeh Nab (Persian: تازه‌ناب), also rendered as Taznab or Tazenab, may refer to:

- Tazehnab-e Mohammad Baqer
- Tazehnab-e Olya
- Tazehnab-e Sofla
- Tazehnab-e Vosta
