= Hayati =

Hayati may refer to:

== People ==
- Hayati Çitaklar (born 1986), Turkish playwright, director, novelist, actor and poet
- Hayati Hamzaoğlu (1933–2000), Turkish actor
- Hayati Yazıcı, Turkish lawyer and politician
- Mohd Hayati Othman, Malaysian politician

== Places ==
- Bakhshi Hayati, a village in Chubar Rural District, Haviq District, Talesh County, Gilan Province, Iran
- Khan Hayati, a village in Chelevand Rural District, Lavandevil District, Astara County, Gilan Province, Iran
- Kuri Hayati, a village in Kuri Rural District, in the Central District of Jam County, Bushehr Province, Iran

== Other uses ==
- Ayaam Hayati, a 2008 album by Moroccan singer Samira Said
- Hayati (album), 2006 album by Syrian singer Asalah Nasri
- "Hayati", a 2013 single by Bulgarian singer Andrea
- "Hayati", a 2020 single by Algerian rapper Soolking featuring German rapper Mero
- "Hayati", a song by A. R. Rahman, Mayssa Karaa and Shiv from the 2018 Indian film Chekka Chivantha Vaanam

== See also ==
- Hayat (disambiguation)
- Pir Hayati (disambiguation)
- Dimple Hayathi (born 1998), Indian actress
