= Hyatt (disambiguation) =

Hyatt is a hotel chain.

Hyatt may also refer to:

== People and fictional characters ==
- Hyatt (surname)
- Hyatt (given name)
- Missy Hyatt, ring name of Melissa Hiatt (born 1963), American professional wrestling valet

== Places ==
- Hyatt Reservoir, Jackson County, Oregon, United States
- Mount Hyatt, Palmer Land, Antarctica
- Hyatt Cove, Graham Land, Antarctica
- 221628 Hyatt, an asteroid

== Ships ==
- Chilean destroyer Hyatt, a destroyer commissioned in 1929 and decommissioned in 1962
- Chilean submarine Hyatt, a submarine commissioned in 1976 and decommissioned in the 1990s

== Other uses ==
- Hyatt Roller Bearing Company, an American manufacturer of roller bearings from 1892 to 1916, founded by John Wesley Hyatt

== See also ==
- Hayat (disambiguation)
- Hyatts, Ohio, United States
- Hiatt
