= Khayat =

Khayat, Khayyat is an Arabic-language occupational surname, literally meaning "tailor". Notable people with the surname include:

== People ==
- Khayat (singer), Ukrainian singer
- Bill Khayat (born 1973), American football coach
- David Khayat (born 1956), French oncologist
- Ed Khayat (1935–2024), American football player
- Jana Khayat, British businesswoman
- Jean Khayat (born 1942), Tunisian Olympic fencer
- Mirna Khayat, Lebanese music video director
- Nadir Khayat, known by the stage name RedOne, Morocco-born Swedish producer and songwriter
- Robert Khayat (born 1938), American academic, Chancellor of the University of Mississippi

=== Related names ===
- Dora Khayatt (1910–1986) Egyptian-born American painter
- Regina Khayatt (1881–1942) Egyptian educator, feminist, suffragist, and temperance worker
- Audishu V Khayyath, patriarch of the Chaldean Catholic Church in 1894–1899

== See also ==
- Al Khayat (name list)
- Chayat (name list)
- Chait (name list)
