= Al Khayat =

Al Khayat, El Khayat, al-Khayyat may refer to:

== Geography ==
- Sidi Abdallah Al Khayat, a small town and rural commune in Meknès Prefecture of the Fès-Meknès region of Morocco

== People ==
- Abdullah Al Khayat, Emirati doctor and hospital director
- Abu Ali al-Khayyat (770–835), 9th-century Arab astrologer
- Moutaz Al-Khayyat (1983–), Syrian-Qatari billionaire entrepreneur
- Rita El Khayat (1944–), Moroccan psychiatrist, anthro-psychoanalyst, writer, and anthropologist
- Ramez Al-Khayyat (1984–), Syrian-Qatari billionaire entrepreneur

== See also ==
- Khayat
- Chayat
- Chait
