= Chait (disambiguation) =

Chait is a Hebrew surname.

Chait may also refer to:

- Chaitra or Chait, Hindu calendar month (March–April)
  - Chaitra (Nepali calendar) or Chait, a Nepali month

== See also ==
- Chaitra (film), 2002 Indian film
