= Bou Assel =

- Location in Morocco
- Coordinates: 34°02′N 5°34′W
- Country: Morocco
- Region: Fès-Meknès
- Prefecture: Meknès
- Time zone: UTC+0 (GMT)

Bou Assel is a settlement in northwestern Morocco situated north of the city of Meknes. Bou Assel is situated slightly south of the ancient city of Volubilis, initially settled by the Phoenicians and Romans over 2000 years ago. The settlement is close to the river of the same name, Oued Bou Assel.

== See also ==
- Douar Doukkara
- Douar Ain Chami
- Moulay Idris
