= Zerhoun =

Mountain in Morocco

Adrar Zerhon جبل زرهون
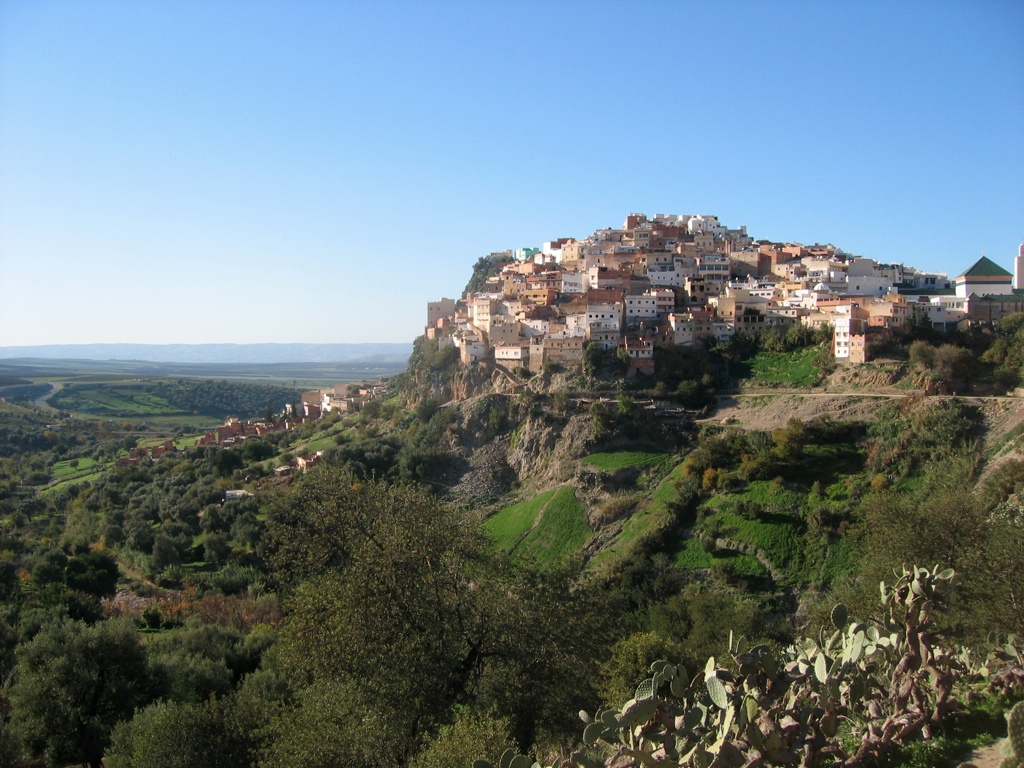
- View of Jbel Zerhoun

Highest point
- Elevation: 1,025 m (3,363 ft)
- Coordinates: 34°2′1.8″N 05°31′12.54″W

Geography
- Location: Morocco
- Parent range: Rif

Climbing
- First ascent: Unknown
- Easiest route: From Meknes

Zerhoun (Arabic: جبل زرهون also spelled Zarhun or Zarhon) is a mountain in Morocco, north of Meknes. On the hill is the Moulay Idris Zerhoun town, named after Moulay Idris I, the founder of the Idrisid dynasty who was buried there in 791 AD.

== Geography ==
Near the Zerhoun range are the ruins of Volubilis, once the Roman provincial capital, and the first home of Idris I. It was settled by Phoenicians or Carthaginians prior to the conclusion of the Punic Wars, when it was annexed by Rome. After the withdrawal of Rome, Christian Berbers continued to inhabit Volubilis until the seventh century AD (Bidwell, 2005). Volubilis has been designated as a World Heritage Site. Also nearby is the town of Moulay Idriss Zerhoun, site of the mausoleum of Idris I.

== See also ==
- Bou Assel
- Meknès-El Menzeh
- Volubilis
