= Hiatt =

Hiatt is a surname. Notable people with the surname include:

- Brenda Hiatt, American author
- Fred Hiatt (1955–2021), American journalist
- Howard Hiatt (1925–2024), American medical researcher, father of Fred Hiatt
- Jack Hiatt (born 1942), American former baseball player
- John Hiatt (born 1952), American musician
- Lester Hiatt (1931–2008), Australian anthropologist
- Phil Hiatt (born 1969), American former baseball player
- Ruth Hiatt (1906–1994), American actress
- Sam Hiatt (born 1998), American soccer player
- Shana Hiatt (born 1975), American model

== Fictional characters ==
- Kevin Hiatt, fictional television character on The Shield

== See also ==
- Hiatt Baker (1863–1934), English rugby union player
- Hiatt, Missouri, a community in the United States
- Hiatt & Co. A defunct UK based handcuff manufacturer best known for their Speedcuffs.
