= Hayat TV =

Hayat TV is the name of the following two television networks:

- Hayat TV (Bosnia and Herzegovina)
- Hayat TV (Turkey)
