= Hyett =

Hyett is a surname. Notable people with the surname include:

- Charles Hyett, English politician
- Francis "Frank" Hyett (1882–1919), Australian politician, trade unionist, cricketer and anti-conscription activist
- Jack Hyett (1915–2001), Australian teacher, broadcaster, author, naturalist and ornithologist
- P. J. Hyett (born 1982/83), American software developer, and co-founder of GitHub
- William Henry Hyett (1795–1877), British Liberal Member of Parliament representing Stroud
- Willoughby Hyett Dickinson, 1st Baron Dickinson (1859–1943), British Liberal Party politician

== See also ==
- Ayette
- Hewett (disambiguation)
- Hewitt (disambiguation)
- Houyet
- Hyatt 10
