= Chami =

Chami may refer to:

- Chami-Embera language (or just Chami), an indigenous American language spoken in north western South America
- Douar Ain Chami, a settlement in northwestern Morocco somewhat to the north of the city of Meknes
- Nymphargus chami, a species of frog in the family Centrolenidae, formerly placed in the genus Cochranella

== Surname ==
- Cyril August Chami (born 1964), Tanzanian politician
- Jean-Marie Chami (born 1962), Lebanese-born Egyptian Melkite Greek Catholic bishop
- Yacoub Joseph Chami (born 1959), Syrian Syriac Catholic archbishop
