= Hyatt (given name) =

Hyatt is a masculine given name borne by:

== People ==
- Hyatt Bass (born 1969), American novelist, screenwriter, film director and philanthropist
- J. Hyatt Brown (born 1937), American billionaire businessman and politician
- Hyatt M. Gibbs (1938–2012), American physicist
- A. Hyatt Mayor (1901–1980), American art historian and curator at the Metropolitan Museum of Art
- A. Hyatt Smith (1814–1892), American lawyer, politician and Wisconsin pioneer
- J. Hyatt Smith (1824–1886), American politician and clergyman
- Hyatt Robert von Dehn (c. 1915–1973), American founder of the Hyatt hotel chain
- Hyatt Howe Waggoner (1913–1988, Hanover, New Hampshire), American English professor

== Fictional characters ==
- Hyatt (Excel Saga), a feminine anime character
