= Hiett =

Hiett may refer to:

- Hiett, Ohio
- Hiett (surname)
