= Al Machouar – Stinia =

Al Machouar - Stinia
- municipality and town
- Location within Morocco
- Coordinates: 33.8915°N 5.5623°W
- Country: Morocco
- Region: Fès-Meknès
- Prefecture: Meknès Prefecture

Population (2004)
  - Total: 5,387
- Time zone: UTC+0 (GMT)

Al Machouar – Stinia is an Administrative Annex in Meknès of the Fès-Meknès region of Morocco. At the time of the 2004 census, the commune had a total population of 5387 people living in 1327 households.
