= Jennifer Rubin (columnist) =

American political commentator (born 1962)

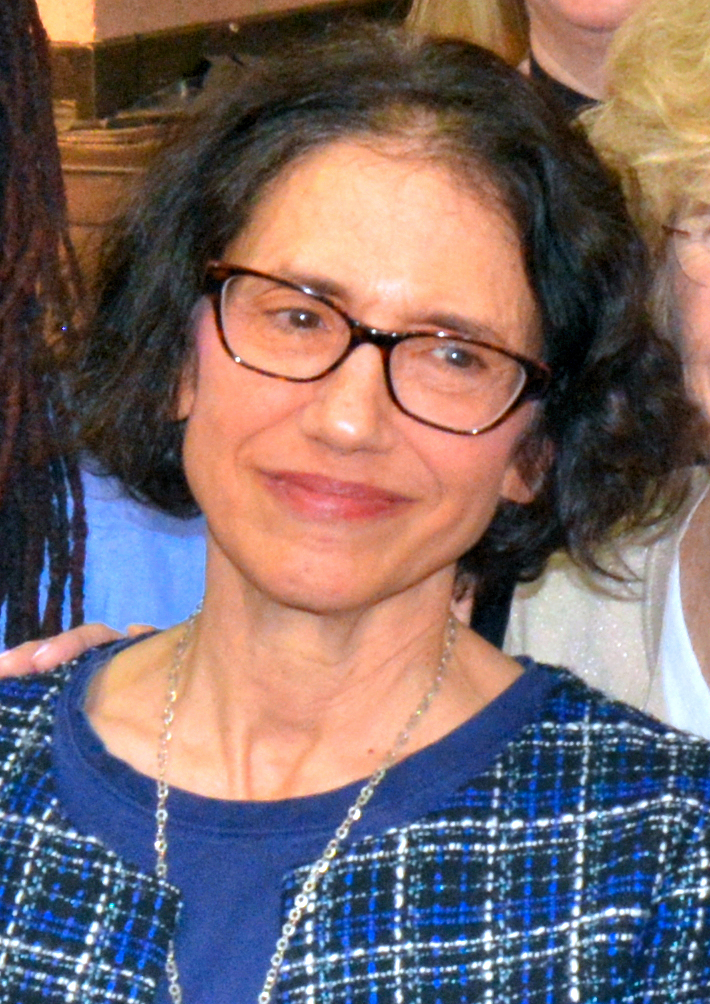
- Rubin in 2024
- Born: June 11, 1962 (age 64)
- Education: UC Berkeley (BA, JD)
- Occupations: Political commentator; lawyer
- Employer: The Washington Post
- Known for: "Right Turn" blog
- Political party: Democratic (2020–present)
- Spouse: Jonathan
- Children: 2

Jennifer Rubin (born June 11, 1962) is an American political commentator who wrote opinion columns for The Washington Post. In January 2025, she announced that she had resigned from that newspaper to become editor-in-chief of a new publication named The Contrarian. Previously she worked at Commentary, PJ Media, Human Events, and The Weekly Standard. Her work has been published in media outlets including Politico, New York Post, New York Daily News, National Review, and The Jerusalem Post.

A conservative political commentator throughout most of her career, she became a vocal critic of President Donald Trump and in September 2020, she announced that she no longer identified as a conservative. In 2021, she became a staunch advocate of the Biden administration.

== Early life and education ==
She spent her early years in the New Jersey suburbs of Philadelphia until 1968, when at the age of six, her family moved to California.

Rubin earned her Bachelor of Arts and Juris Doctor degrees from the University of California, Berkeley, finishing first in her class in law school.

== Career ==
=== Labor and employment law ===
Before moving into opinion writing, Rubin was a labor and employment lawyer in Los Angeles, working for Hollywood studios, for 20 years. She now describes herself as a "recovering lawyer". Commenting on working with her from 2000 to 2005, Hollywood animator and trade union leader Steve Hulett spoke to Media Matters: "She talked like a straight-ahead Hollywood liberal ... She supported Kerry in 2004 and worked closely with [Jeffrey] Katzenberg, who is a big time Democratic donor. I didn't know what to think when she moved east and started blogging like mad as a conservative. I don't know if it's a marketing pose, or if she really believes it, or what. But it is odd".

=== Opinion writer ===
In 2005, she moved to Northern Virginia with her husband and two children. She offered a column to The Weekly Standard about Mitt Romney, and continued doing freelance work for two years before joining Commentary.

Rubin's move to The Washington Post in November 2010 became a national news story and was discussed by the media on all sides of the political spectrum, ranging from The American Conservative and The Weekly Standard, to Salon and Slate. In welcoming remarks, The Washington Post editorial page editor Fred Hiatt wrote, "her provocative writing has become 'must read' material for news and policy makers and avid political watchers." In 2011, she was included on the list of "50 Most Influential American Jews" by The Jewish Daily Forward. Slate blogger David Weigel called Rubin "one of the right's most prolific online political writers". The Commentary editor John Podhoretz writes of Rubin, "She is a phenomenon, especially considering that for the first two decades of her working life, she was not a writer or a journalist but a lawyer specializing in labor issues."

In August 2013, former Washington Post ombudsman Patrick Pexton criticized Rubin in an open letter from his new desk at the Washington City Paper, saying that he received more complaint emails about Rubin than any other Post employee. Writing that her columns were "at best ... political pornography", he said "Have Fred Hiatt, your editorial page editor—who I like, admire, and respect—fire opinion blogger Jennifer Rubin. Not because she's conservative, but because she's just plain bad." Fred Hiatt, editorial page editor for the Post, responded in a statement to Politico, "I appreciate Patrick's perspective but I think he is quite wrong about Jennifer Rubin. Regular readers of her blog know that she is an indefatigable reporter who is as hard on politicians on the right when she thinks they get things wrong as on the other side."

== Political views and commentaries ==
Rubin was a conservative, but she has also stated that the term has been "ruined" by pro-Trump conservatives and that she would "prefer to be a 19th century liberal or a wet Tory". She has described herself as "a Pat Moynihan Democrat, a Scoop Jackson Democrat, an Andrew Cuomo Democrat. I'm not a Bernie Sanders Democrat." In a 2024 column, she wrote in favor of radical centrism.

Rubin has supported the Likud government in Israel, and has been a critic of Hamas and of the Palestine Liberation Organization leadership. In November 2011, Rubin retweeted an anti-Hamas blog post that Post ombudsman Patrick Pexton called "reprehensible". Rubin later told Pexton that she endorsed and shared the views in the Post that "expressed an understandable desire for righteous vengeance against the kidnappers and human rights abusers of Gilad Shalit". Pexton said, "in agreeing with the sentiment, and in spreading it to her 7,000 Twitter followers who know her as a Washington Post blogger, Rubin did damage to the Post and the credibility that keeps it afloat." Andrew Sullivan wrote, "we have a blogger at the WaPo endorsing throwing Arab prisoners into the sea to meet righteous divine punishment." Post editorial page editor Fred Hiatt defended Rubin, saying, "As a general matter I think it isn't wise for me to comment on the work of the ombudsman, who is entitled to his views, and over whom I do not have editorial control. However, I will say this: I think Jennifer is an excellent journalist and a relentless reporter. I think because she has strong views, and because she is as willing to take on her home team, as it were, as the visitors, she comes under more scrutiny than many and is often the target of unjustified criticism. I think she brings enormous value to the Post."

In 2011, Rubin wrote a blog post suggesting that the 2011 Norway attacks were carried out by Islamic jihadists. Columnist James Fallows of The Atlantic criticized the piece as "rushed" and noted the subsequent discovery that the attack was carried out by Anders Behring Breivik, a native Norwegian who was not a Muslim. Another Atlantic columnist, Jeffrey Goldberg, responded that the criticism was unwarranted, noting that other publications such as Wired and even The Atlantic itself had printed similar speculation; Goldberg concluded: "It is not perverse or absurd for normal people to think of al Qaeda when they hear of acts of mass terrorism. It is logical, in fact, to suspect al Qaeda." In a follow-up column, Rubin acknowledged that early suspicions of a jihadist attack had proven to be mistaken.

International Relations scholar Daniel W. Drezner has described her views on foreign policy as neoconservative. Rubin has opposed the Obama administration's policy of détente with Cuba and criticized John McCain for arguing against torture.

=== Criticism of Donald Trump ===
Rubin has been one of the most vocal conservative writers to criticize Donald Trump, as well as the overall behavior of the Republican Party during Trump's term in office. Rubin denounced Donald Trump's decision to withdraw from the 2015 Paris Agreement as "a dog whistle to the far right", and designed to please his "climate change denial, right-wing base that revels in scientific illiteracy." Previously, after Barack Obama had approved the agreement, Rubin characterized it as "nonsense" and argued that it would not achieve anything. Rubin described Trump's 2017 decision to not implement parts of the Iran nuclear deal as the "emotional temper tantrum of an unhinged president." She had previously said that "if you examine the Iran deal in any detail, you will be horrified as to what is in there." Rubin strongly supported the United States officially recognizing Jerusalem as Israel's capital and moving its embassy from Tel Aviv to Jerusalem. Early in his presidency, she criticized Trump for not doing so, saying that it was indicative of his tendency to "never keep his word." She concluded that Trump "looks buffoonish in his hasty retreat". In December 2017, after Trump announced that he would move the embassy, she said it was "a foreign policy move without purpose."

In a tweet referred to by CNN Media, Mike Huckabee questioned Rubin, writing: "Jen Rubin is WAPO's excuse for conservative," and adding that Rubin's "contempt for all things Trump exposes her and WAPO as fake news".

=== Domestic policy views ===
Conor Friedersdorf of The Atlantic argued that after the 2012 presidential election, Rubin criticized aspects of the Mitt Romney campaign that she had previously praised, with Friedersdorf insisting that she had acted as "a disingenuous mouthpiece for her favored candidate". Other columnists had similarly derided her column's blatant support for the Romney campaign, such as Jeffrey Lord of The American Spectator and Jonathan Chait of Intelligencer, who argued "Rubin has appointed herself unofficial spokesperson for Mitt Romney's presidential campaign, using her blog to record a daily procession of Romney's wise choices and brilliant triumphs, along with the pathetic failures of all who challenge him."

As well as Romney, Rubin has expressed admiration for Lindsey Graham, writing "If being right is the criterion, Graham has been right about more things on foreign policy for longer than just about anyone in the race".

In a November 21, 2013, column, Rubin called on the National Organization for Marriage (NOM) to end its campaign against same-sex marriage.

== The Contrarian ==
In January 2025, Rubin and attorney Norm Eisen began authoring a Substack publication entitled The Contrarian.

== Personal life ==
Rubin and her husband, Jonathan, have two sons. The couple moved to Oakton, Virginia, from Los Angeles in 2005.

== See also ==
- Stop Trump movement
