= Mrhassiyine =

- Rural commune and town
- Location within Morocco
- Coordinates: 34.0141°N 5.4618°W
- Country: Morocco
- Region: Fès-Meknès
- Prefecture: Meknès Prefecture

Population (2004)
  - Total: 7,774
- Time zone: UTC+0 (GMT)

Mrhassiyine is a small town and rural commune in Meknès Prefecture of the Fès-Meknès region of Morocco. At the time of the 2004 census, the commune had a total population of 7,774 people living in 1,621 households.
