= Isaac Hayyut =

Polish rabbi (died 1726)

Rabbi Isaac Hayyut
- יצחק חיות

Personal life
- Died: September 1726 Skole
- Parent: Jacob (father)

Religious life
- Religion: Judaism

Isaac ben Jacob Ḥayyut (died 1726) was a Polish rabbi.

He was descended from an old Provençal family which first settled in Bohemia, and was the grandson of Rabbi Menahem Manesh Hayyut of Wilna.

He became rabbi of Skole, near Lviv, late in life, and remained there until his death.

He wrote thirteen works, which are enumerated in the preface to his "Zera' Yiẓḥaḳ" (Hebrew: זרע יצחק) on the Mishnah, which was published by his son Eliezer (Frankfort-on-the-Oder, 1732). His "Iggeret Ḳeẓ Ḥai" (Hebrew: אגרת קץ חי), describing in a kabbalistic manner "terrible things which he had seen in the upper world," was published in Chernivtsi in 1862.

He died at Skole in September, 1726.
