= Ain Orma =

- Rural commune and town
- Location within Morocco
- Coordinates: 33.8940°N 5.7480°W
- Country: Morocco
- Region: Fès-Meknès
- Prefecture: Meknès Prefecture

Population (2004)
  - Total: 3,716
- Time zone: UTC+0 (GMT)

Ain Orma is a small town and rural commune in Meknès Prefecture of the Fès-Meknès region of Morocco. At the time of the 2004 census, the commune had a total population of 3,716 people living in 731 households.
