= Moulay Idriss Zerhoun =

Moulay Driss Zerhoun
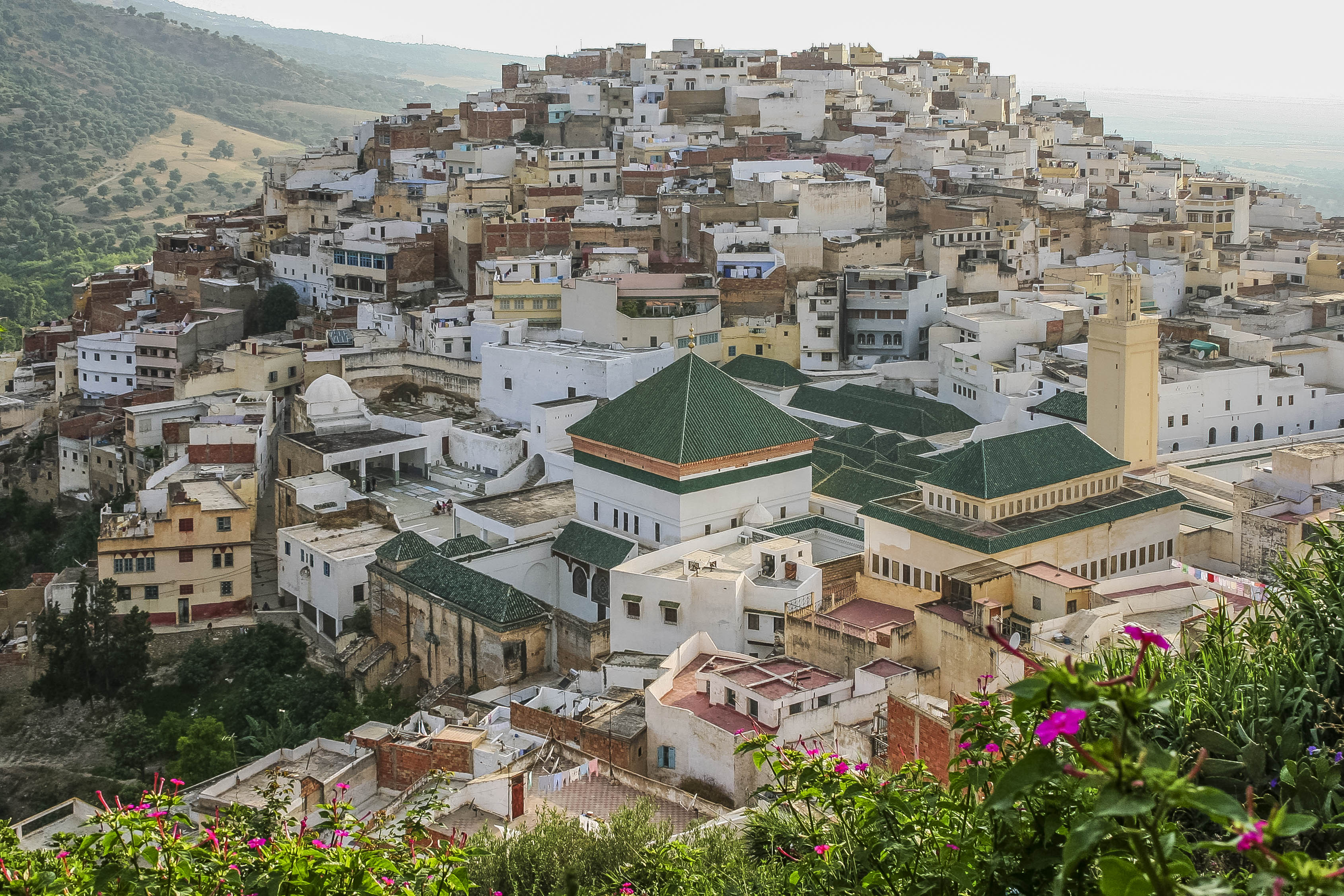
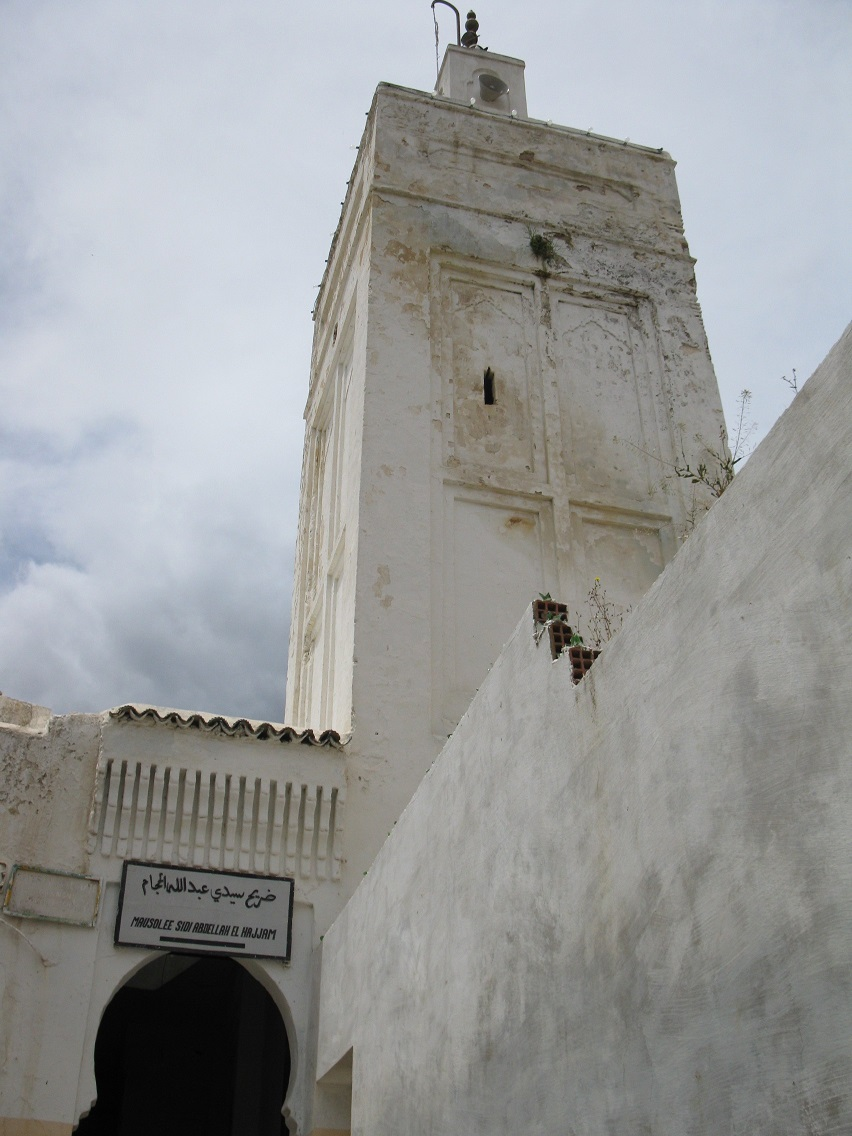
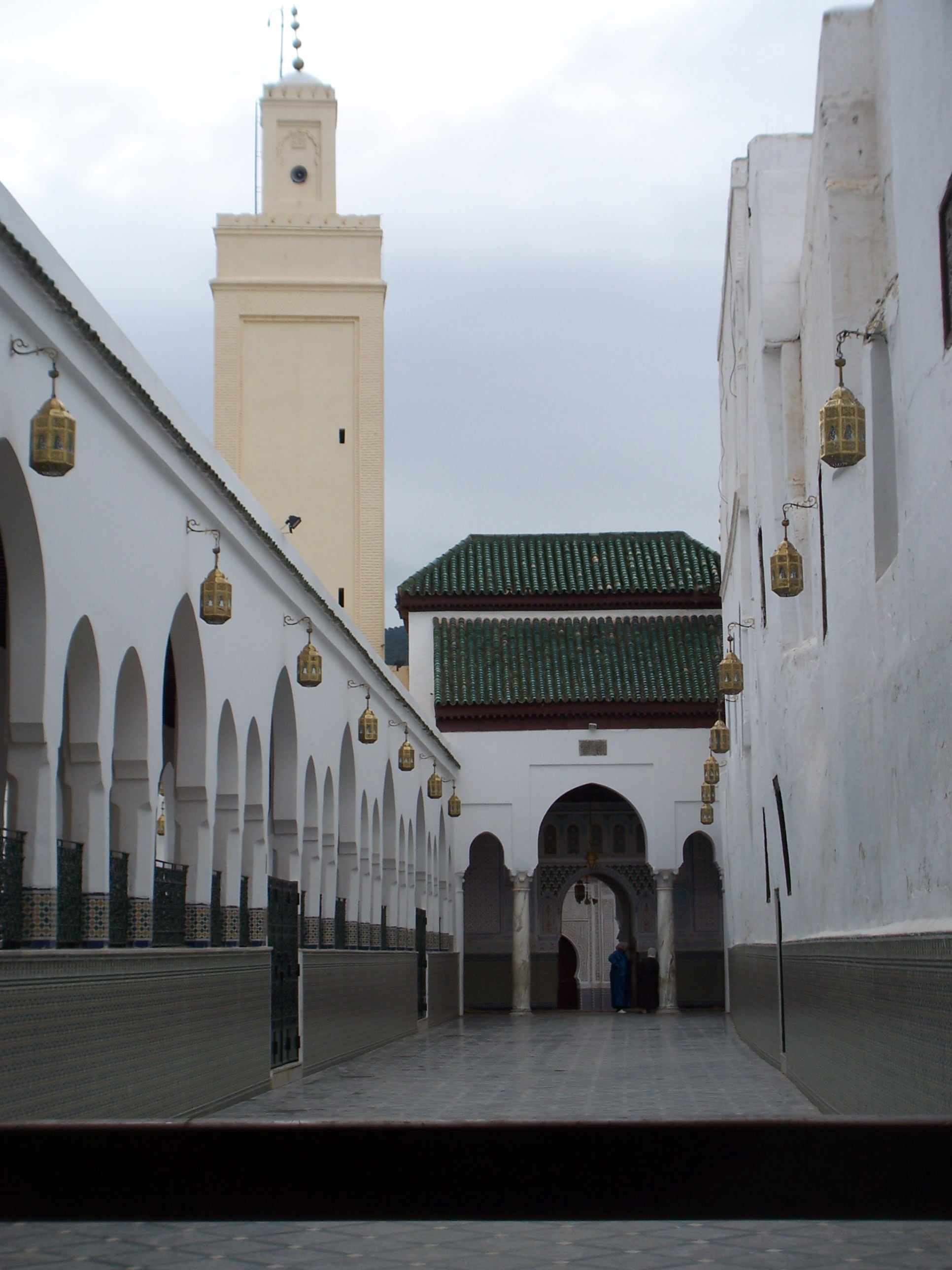
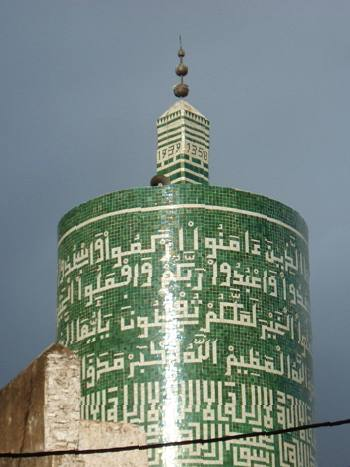
- Clockwise from top: view of the city, with the pyramidal roof of the mausoleum of Moulay Idris visible; the entrance to the mosque and mausoleum complex of Moulay Idris I; the Cylindrical Minaret of the Sentissi Mosque; and the Mausoleum-mosque of Sidi Abdellah el Hajjam.
- Interactive map of Moulay Driss Zerhoun
- Coordinates: 34°3′15″N 5°31′38″W
- Country: Morocco
- Region: Fès-Meknès
- Prefecture: Meknes
- Elevation: 1,740 ft (530 m)

Population (2014)
  - Total: 11,615
- Time zone: UTC+0 (GMT)

Moulay Idriss, Moulay Driss Zerhoun or simply Zerhoun (Arabic: مولاي إدريس زرهون) is a town in Meknes Prefecture, Fès-Meknès region of northern Morocco, spread over two hills at the base of Mount Zerhoun. It is famous for being the site of the tomb of Idris I, the first ruler of the Idrisid dynasty, after whom the town is named. It is located near Meknes and overlooks the ruins of Volubilis three kilometers to the north-west.

== History ==
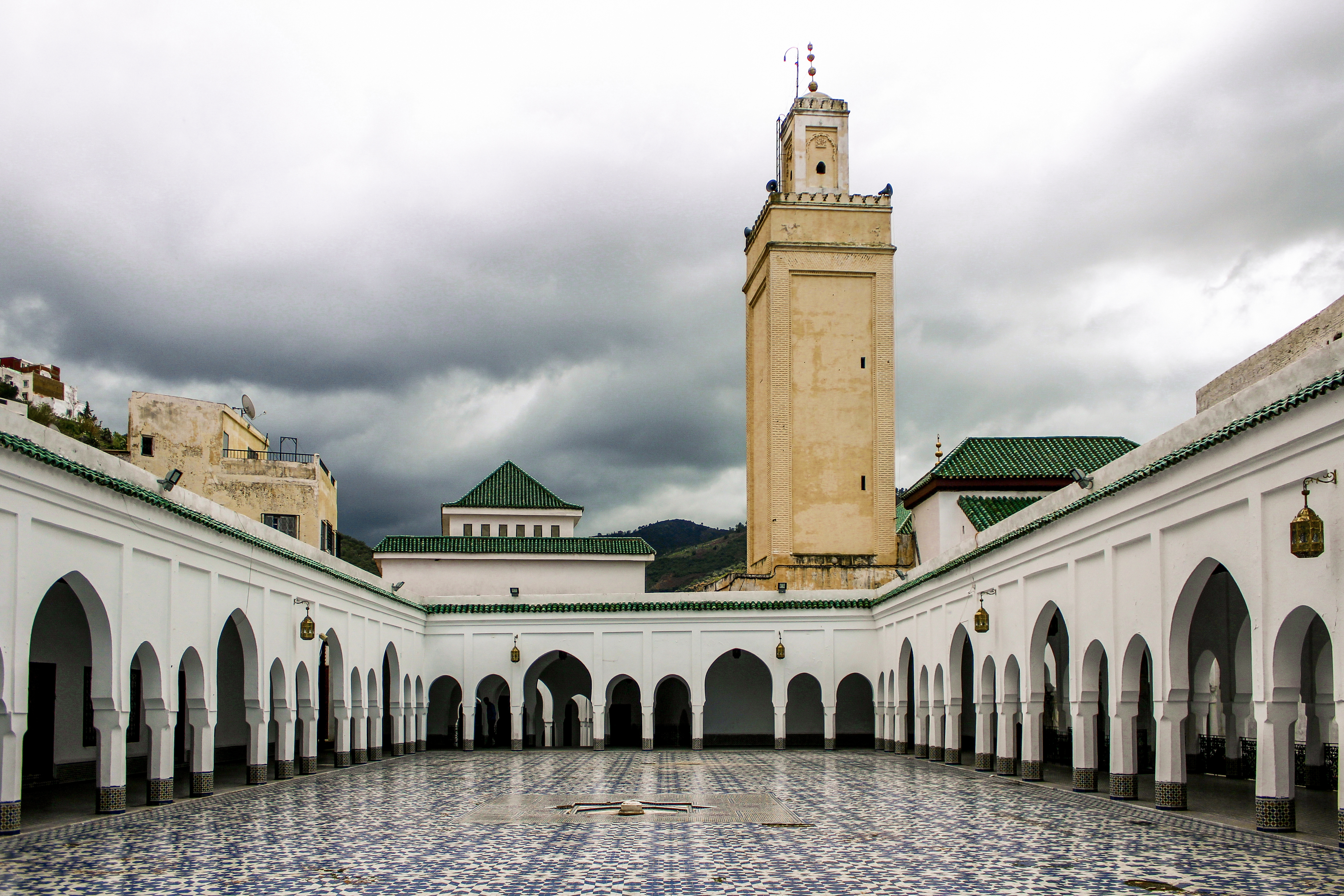
An outer courtyard of the Zawiya of Moulay Idris.

Idris I (known as Moulay Idris) was a descendant of Muhammad who fled from Abbasid-controlled territory after the Battle of Fakh because he had supported the defeated pro-Shi'a rebels. He established himself at Oualili (Volubilis), a formerly Roman town which by then was mostly inhabited by Berbers and a small population of Judeo-Christian heritage. He used his prestige as a descendant of Muhammad to forge an alliance with local Berber tribes (in particular the Awraba) in 789 and quickly became the most important religious and political leader in the region. As the old site of Roman Volubilis was located on an open plain and considered vulnerable, the settlement moved up a few kilometers towards the mountains, presumably around the site of the current town of Moulay Idriss, leaving the old Roman ruins abandoned.

Idris I died soon after in 791, possibly poisoned on the order of the Abbasid caliph Harun al-Rashid, just before his son Idris (II) was born. Once Idris II came of age and officially took over his position as ruler in 803, he continued his father's endeavors and significantly expanded the authority of the new Idrisid state. As a result, the Idrisid dynasty was of central importance to the early Islamization of Morocco, forming the first true "Islamic" state to consolidate power over much of its territory. They also founded the important city of Fes, about 50 kilometres away, which became the Idrisid capital under Idris II.

The early history of Moulay Idriss Zerhoun (sometimes called simply Moulay Idriss) as a town is not widely discussed by historians. A mausoleum for Idris I presumably existed on this site, overlooking Volubilis/Oualili, since his death. The tomb was probably placed inside a qubba (general term for a domed building or structure), and the name Oualili was eventually replaced by the name Moulay Idriss. Some anti-Idrisid rulers in 10th-century Fes claimed that Idris II was also buried here (instead of in his alleged tomb in Fes itself), though he is widely believed to be buried in Fes, where his mausoleum and mosque is still a site of major importance today.

Although the town became a site of pilgrimage early on, after Idris II it was quickly overshadowed by Fes, which became the most important city of the region. The popularity of Idris I and his son as Muslim "saints" and figures of national importance was not constant throughout Morocco's history, with their status declining significantly after the end of Idrisid influence in the 10th century. The Almoravids, the next major dynasty after them, were hostile to the cult of saints and other practices judged less orthodox under their stricter views of Islam. It was only during the Marinid period, from the 14th century onward, that the Idrisid founders became celebrated again and that their religious importance redeveloped. An early sign of this was the alleged rediscovery of Idris I's remains in 1318, at Moulay Idris Zerhoun, which apparently caused something of a sensation among the local population and attracted attention from the Marinid authorities. During this time, the annual moussem (religious festival) in August, celebrating Moulay Idris I, was instituted and began to take shape.

The mausoleum itself apparently remained little changed for many centuries. Under the sharifian dynasties of Morocco, the Saadians and (especially) the Alaouites, who also claimed descent from Muhammad, the status of Idris I and II as foundational figures in Moroccan history was further elevated in order to enhance the new dynasties' own legitimacy. Moulay Ismail, the powerful and long-reigning Alaouite sultan between 1672 and 1727, ordered the existing mausoleum to be demolished and rebuilt on a grander scale. Adjoining properties were purchased for the purpose. Construction lasted from 1719 to 1721. Once finished, Moulay Ismail ordered that the khutba (Friday sermon) be performed regularly in the mausoleum's mosque, which established it as the main Friday mosque of the city. In 1822, the Alaouite sultan Moulay Abderrahman (Abd al-Rahman), purchased another property adjoining the mausoleum in order to rebuild the mosque on an even bigger and more lavish scale. Under Sultan Sidi Mohammed (Mohammed IV; ruled 1859–1873), some expert ceramic tilework decoration was added by the Meknesi artisan Ibn Makhlouf.

Following Moroccan independence in 1956, the mausoleum was redecorated and the mosque expanded yet again by King Mohammed V and his son Hassan II. To this day, Idris's tomb is a pilgrimage site and the center of a popular moussem (religious festival) every August. The gold-embroidered covering over his tomb is replaced regularly every one or two years during its own ritual attended by religious and political figures. Due to its status as a holy city and sanctuary, the town was off-limits to non-Muslims until 1912, and non-Muslims were not able to stay overnight until 2005.

Since 1995, Moulay Idriss Zerhoun has been on UNESCO's Tentative list of World Heritage Sites.

== Geography ==
The town is currently in the Fès-Meknès region. From 1997 to 2015 it was in Meknès-Tafilalet. The ruins of the Berber and Roman city of Volubilis are located just five kilometers away. Idris I took many materials from here in order to build his town. Further away are the cities of Meknes (about 28 km away by road) and Fez (about 50 km away).

The town is located on two adjacent foothills of the Zerhoun mountains, the Khiber and the Tasga, which form the town's two main districts. Between these is the mausoleum and religious complex of Moulay Idris. The Khiber is the taller of the two hills and its summit offers views over the religious complex and the rest of town. The Sentissi Mosque and the Mausoleum-mosque of Sidi Abdallah el Hajjam are also located near the top of the Khiber hill.

== Notable sites and landmarks ==
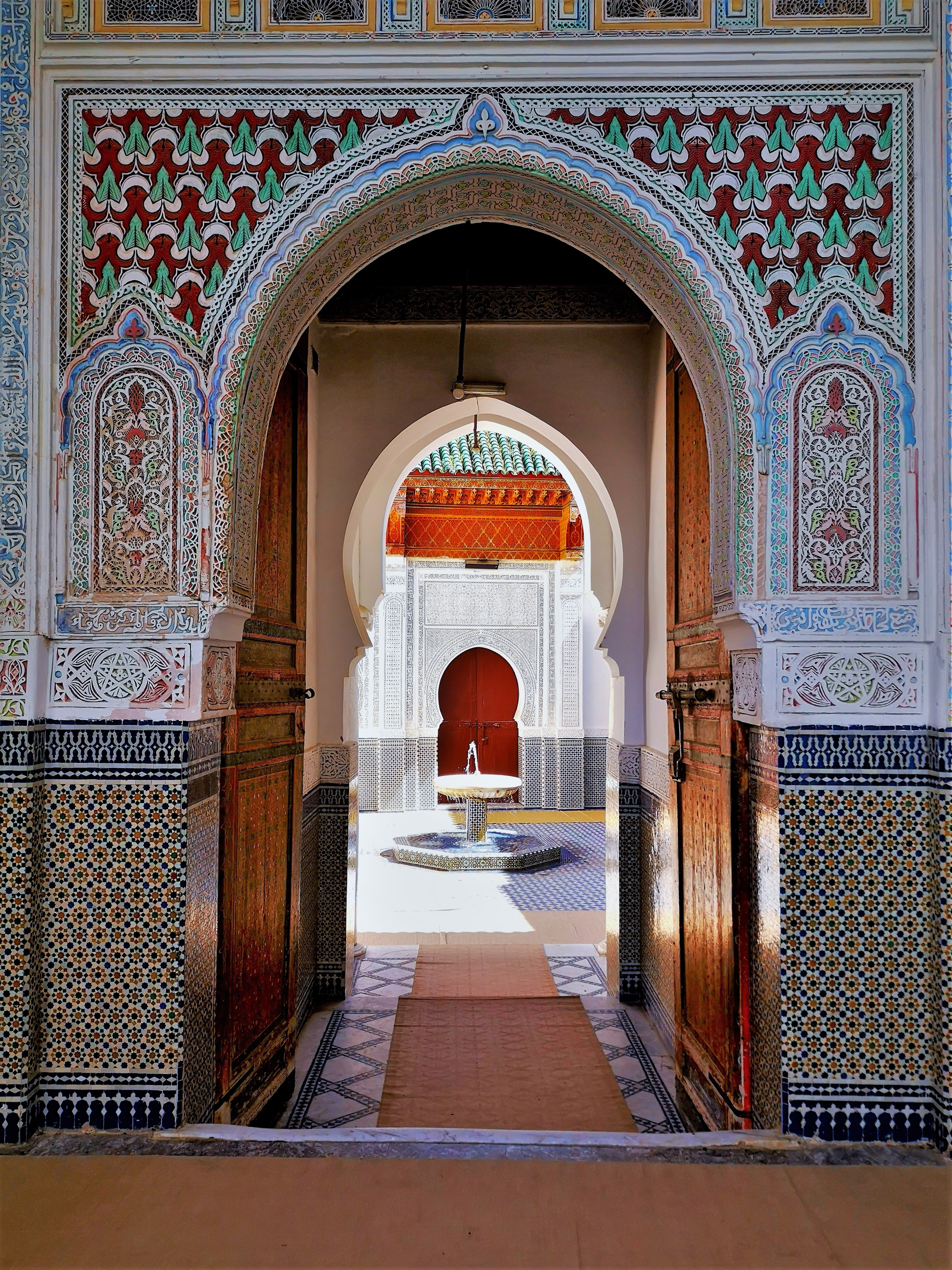
The entrance to the zawiya.

=== Zawiya of Moulay Idris I ===
The zawiya (a religious complex including a mausoleum, mosque, and other amenities; also spelled zaouia) of Moulay Idris is located at the center of town, with its entrance just off the main town square. It is reached then reached via a long passage that leads to the main building. This includes the mausoleum chamber, recognizable from afar by its huge green-tiled pyramidal roof, and a mosque area. It also has a tall minaret with a square shaft, typical of Moroccan architecture. The decoration is rich and dates from the Alaouite period, including from the 20th century. The zawiya is off limits to non-Muslims.

=== Cylindrical Minaret ===
The Sentissi Mosque was built in 1939 by a local man after his return from the hajj in Mecca. It allegedly has the only cylindrical minaret in Morocco. The minaret is covered in a background of green tiles with white Kufic-style Arabic letters spelling out a surah from the Qur'an. The mosque is now a Qur'anic school (madrasa), and is also referred to as the Medrasa Idrissi.

== See also ==
- Lists of mosques
- List of mosques in Africa
- List of mosques in Morocco
- Bou Assel
- Douar Doukkara
- Volubilis
