= Douar Doukkara =

Coordinates: 34°05′N 5°32′W

Douar Doukkara is a settlement in the western part of Morocco. Douar Doukkara is situated in the vicinity of the ancient city of Volubilis, initially settled by the Phoenicians and Romans over 2000 years ago. Alternative spellings for this community are Douar Doukara and Douar Dokkara.

== See also ==
- Douar Ain Chami
- Moulay Idris
