= Oued Jdida =

Coordinates: 33°56′N 5°22′W

Oued Jdida واد الجديدة
- Rural commune and town
- Interactive map of Oued Jdida
- Country: Morocco
- Region: Fès-Meknès
- Prefecture: Meknès-El Menzeh Prefecture

Population (2004)
  - Total: 13,634
- Time zone: UTC+0 (GMT)

Oued Jdida is a small town and rural commune in Meknès-El Menzeh Prefecture of the Fès-Meknès region of Morocco. At the time of the 2004 census, the commune had a total population of 13634 people living in 2309 households.
