= M'Haya =

- Rural commune and town
- Interactive map of M'Haya
- Coordinates: 33.9769°N 5.2499°W
- Country: Morocco
- Region: Fès-Meknès
- Prefecture: Meknès Prefecture

Population (2004)
  - Total: 21,112
- Time zone: UTC+0 (GMT)

M'Haya is a small town and rural commune in Meknès Prefecture of the Fès-Meknès region of Morocco. At the time of the 2004 census, the commune had a total population of 21112 people living in 3410 households.
