= Hiett (surname) =

Hiett is a surname. Notable people with the surname include:

- Jessie Hiett (1874–1962), New Zealand temperance activist
- Steve Hiett (1940–2019), English photographer, musician, artist, and graphic designer
- Todd Hiett (born 1967), American rancher and politician

== See also ==
- Hyatt (disambiguation)
