= Ain Jemaa =

Ain Jemaa عين جمعة
- Rural commune and town
- Location within Morocco
- Coordinates: 34°02′N 5°48′W
- Country: Morocco
- Region: Fès-Meknès
- Prefecture: Meknès Prefecture

Population (2004)
  - Total: 13,146
- Time zone: UTC+0 (GMT)

Ain Jemaa is a small town and rural commune in Meknès Prefecture of the Fès-Meknès region of Morocco. At the time of the 2004 census, the commune had a total population of 13,146 people living in 1893 households.
