= Hieatt (surname) =

Hieatt is a surname that appears to have originated from England. The Hieatt spelling is a variant of Hyatt, rather than a separately originated name. The Oxford Dictionary of Family Names in Britain and Ireland groups Hyatt, Hyett, Hiatt, Hieatt, Hiett and Highet together.

The surname is one of several spellings that emerged from a medieval surname denoting a dweller '(by the) high gate', Middle English heigh(e), high(e) + yat(e), gat(e) (Old English hēah + geat). Thus it is a topographic rather than occupational or patronymic surname.

Forms of the surname have been documented for more than 700 years. Recorded forms of the surname include Heghet in Lancashire in 1381, Hyette in Bristol in 1474, Hyet in London in 1514, Hyett in Worcestershire in 1539, and Hiatt in Leicester in 1599. By 1881, the related Hyatt surname and its variants were particularly associated with the southwestern Midlands, including Warwickshire and Gloucestershire, as well as Somerset.

The Hieatt spelling can be traced as far back as 1636, where a local historical transcription of 17th-century rate records identifies a John Heiatt/Hieatt and says that after his death his property was recorded in 1686 as belonging to "late John Hieatt deceased".

The Hieatt spelling is found in the United States, Canada, New Zealand, and Australia. The North American branch appears to have migrated in the late 1600s to early 1700s from England, though direct evidence of this migration is still inconclusive. The New Zealand and Australian branch is well documented, with the migration occurring in the 1800s.

== Notable people ==
- Raisbel Cossem Hieatt (1855–1926), County Judge of Franklin County, Kentucky.
- Clarence Clifton Hieatt (1877-1973), Realtor, one half of the Hieatt Brothers Realty. President of the National Association of Real Estate Boards in 1927.
- Bernard Laurence Hieatt (1909–1930), English air pilot and motorcycle racer.
- A. Kent Hieatt (1921–2009) American scholar of languages. Husband of Constance.
- Constance Bartlett Hieatt (1928–2011), American scholar of languages.
- David Hieatt (living), Welsh entrepreneur, brand-builder, and author. He founded clothing company Howies, and later co-founded Hiut Denim Co.
- Adrian Hieatt (living), British journalist and announcer whose voice has been used for automated announcements on the London Underground's 1992 Stock.
- Brian Hieatt (living), American law enforcement officer and Sheriff of Tazewell County, Virginia.
- Kelvin Hieatt (living), New Zealand local politician, chair of the Papakura Local Board since 2025.

== See also ==
- Hyatt (surname), a variant spelling
- Samuel Hieatt House, a historic house in Henry County, Kentucky
