= Dar Oum Soltane =

Dar Oum Soltane دار أم السلطان
- Rural commune and town
- Location within Morocco
- Coordinates: 33.9019°N 5.6443°W
- Country: Morocco
- Region: Fès-Meknès
- Prefecture: Meknès Prefecture

Population (2004)
  - Total: 6,104
- Time zone: UTC+0 (GMT)

Dar Oum Soltane is a small town and rural commune in Meknès Prefecture of the Fès-Meknès region of Morocco. At the time of the 2004 census, the commune had a total population of 6104 people living in 905 households.
