= Majjate =

Majjatt مجاط
- Rural commune and town
- Location within Morocco
- Coordinates: 33.8184°N 5.5132°W
- Country: Morocco
- Region: Fès-Meknès
- Prefecture: Meknès Prefecture

Area
  - Total: 195.140 km^{2} (75.344 sq mi)

Population (2004)
  - Total: 8,514
- Time zone: UTC+0 (GMT)

Majjate is a small town and rural commune in Meknès Prefecture of the Fès-Meknès region of Morocco. At the time of the 2004 census, the commune had a population of 8,514 living in 1,590 households.
