= Charqaoua =

- Rural commune and town
- Location within Morocco
- Coordinates: 34.1851°N 5.3909°W
- Country: Morocco
- Region: Fès-Meknès
- Prefecture: Meknès Prefecture

Population (2004)
  - Total: 5,540
- Time zone: UTC+0 (GMT)

Charqaoua is a small town and rural commune in Meknès-El Menzeh Prefecture of the Fès-Meknès region of Morocco. At the time of the 2004 census, the commune had a total population of 5,540 people living in 797 households.
