= Dkhissa =

- Rural commune and town
- Location within Morocco
- Coordinates: 33.9373°N 5.4666°W
- Country: Morocco
- Region: Fès-Meknès
- Prefecture: Meknès Prefecture

Population (2004)
  - Total: 13,541
- Time zone: UTC+0 (GMT)

Dkhissa is a small town and rural commune in Meknès Prefecture of the Fès-Meknès region of Morocco. At the time of the 2004 census, the commune had a total population of 13,541 people living in 2,476 households.
