= Sidi Slimane Moul Al Kifane =

Sidi Slimane Moul Al Kifane سيدي سليمان مول الكيفان
- Rural commune and town
- Location within Morocco
- Coordinates: 33.8605°N 5.4612°W
- Country: Morocco
- Region: Fès-Meknès
- Prefecture: Meknès Prefecture

Population (2004)
  - Total: 15,136
- Time zone: UTC+0 (GMT)

Sidi Slimane Moul Al Kifane is a small town and rural commune in Meknès Prefecture of the Fès-Meknès region of Morocco. At the time of the 2004 census, the commune had a total population of 15136 people living in 2769 households.
