= Boufakrane =

Coordinates: 33°46′N 5°29′W

- municipality and town
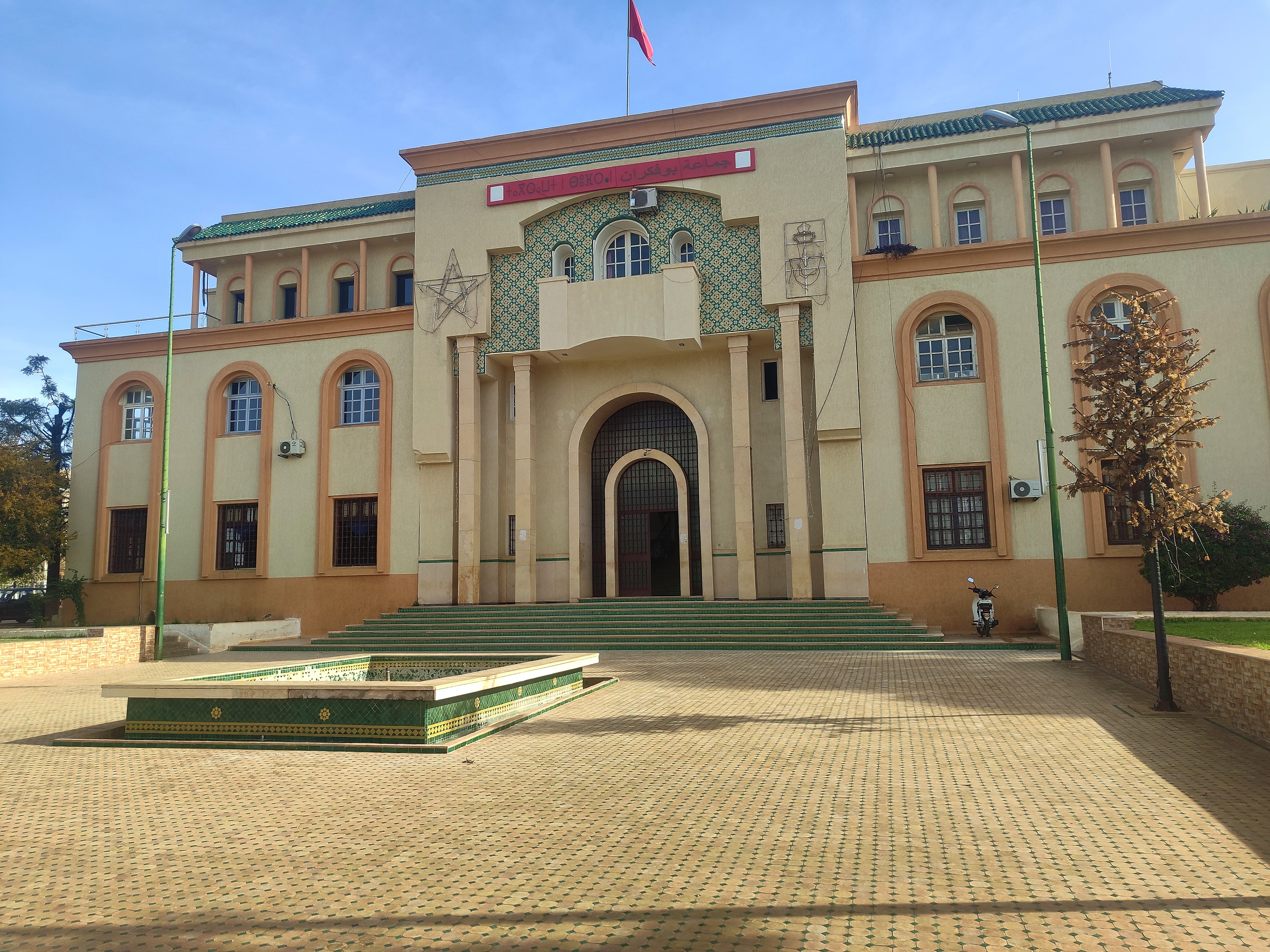
- Interactive map of Boufakrane
- Country: Morocco
- Region: Fès-Meknès
- Prefecture: Meknès Prefecture

Population (2024)
  - Total: 16,892
- Time zone: UTC+0 (GMT)

Boufakrane is a town and municipality in Meknès Prefecture of the Fès-Meknès region of Morocco. At the time of the 2004 census, the commune had a total population of 6326 people living in 1376 households.
