= Oued Rommane =

- Rural commune and town
- Location within Morocco
- Coordinates: 34.1038°N 5.7005°W
- Country: Morocco
- Region: Fès-Meknès
- Prefecture: Meknès Prefecture

Population (2004)
  - Total: 6,076
- Time zone: UTC+0 (GMT)

Oued Rommane is a small town and former rural commune in Meknès Prefecture of the Fès-Meknès region of Morocco. At the time of the 2004 census, the commune had a total population of 6,076 people living in 897 households.

the commune was merged with Ain Karma and is now defunct.
