= Ain Karma =

Coordinates: 34.0071°N 5.6182°W

Ain Karma عين كرمة
- Rural commune and town
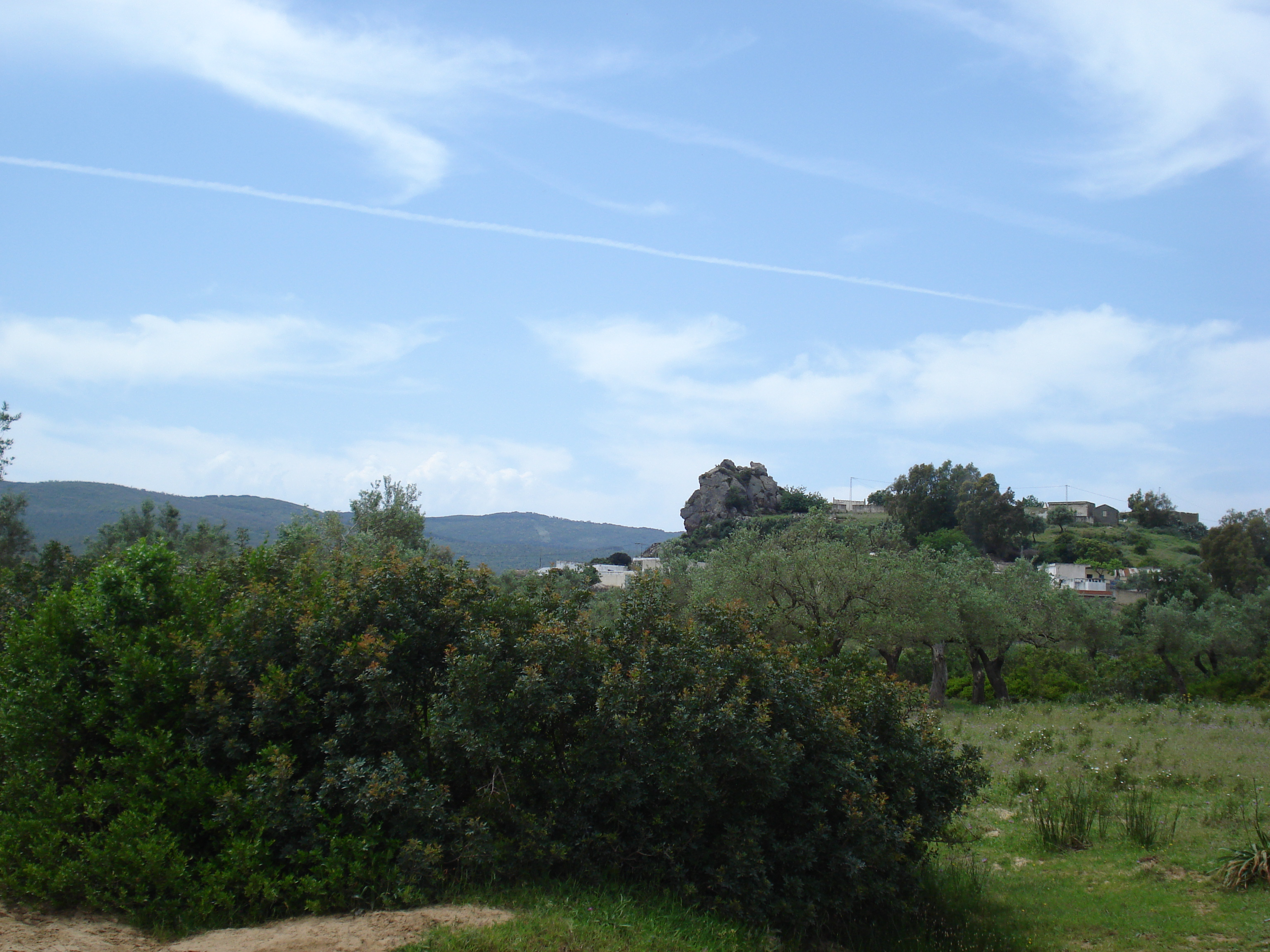

- Location within Morocco
- Country: Morocco
- Region: Fès-Meknès
- Prefecture: Meknès Prefecture

Population (2004)
  - Total: 9,738
- Time zone: UTC+0 (GMT)

Ain Karma is a small town and rural commune in Meknès Prefecture of the Fès-Meknès region of Morocco. At the time of the 2004 census, the commune had a total population of 9738 people living in 1674 households.

the commune was merged with Oued Rommane into Ain Karma-Oued Rommane.
