= N'Zalat Bni Amar =

Coordinates: 34°05′53″N 5°24′58″W

- Rural commune and town
- Interactive map of N'Zalat Bni Amar
- Country: Morocco
- Region: Fès-Meknès
- Prefecture: Meknès Prefecture

Population (2004)
  - Total: 8,609
- Time zone: UTC+0 (GMT)

N'Zalat Bni Amar is a small town and rural commune in Meknès Prefecture of the Fès-Meknès region of Morocco. At the time of the 2004 census, the commune had a total population of 8609 people living in 1780 households.
