= Pir Hayati-ye Sofla =

Village in Kermanshah, Iran

Pir Hayati-ye Sofla پیرحیاتی سفلی
- Village
- Location within Iran
- Coordinates: 34°17′16″N 46°45′58″E
- Country: Iran
- Province: Kermanshah
- County: Kermanshah
- Bakhsh: Mahidasht
- Rural District: Mahidasht

Population (2006)
  - Total: 210
- Time zone: UTC+3:30 (IRST)
  - Summer (DST): UTC+4:30 (IRDT)

Pir Hayati-ye Sofla (Persian: پیرحیاتی سفلی, also Romanized as Pīr Ḩayātī-ye Soflá; also known as Pīr Ḩayātī, Pīr Ḩayātī-ye Pā’īn, Pīriāī, and Pīryal) is a village in Mahidasht Rural District, Mahidasht District, Kermanshah County, Kermanshah Province, Iran. At the 2006 census, its population was 210, in 47 families.
