= Tazehnab-e Olya =

Tazehnab-e Olya تازه‌ناب علیا
- village
- Location within Iran
- Coordinates: 34°06′47″N 48°18′56″E
- Country: Iran
- Province: Hamadan
- County: Nahavand
- Bakhsh: Central
- Rural District: Shaban

Population (2006)
  - Total: 296
- Time zone: UTC+3:30 (IRST)
  - Summer (DST): UTC+4:30 (IRDT)
- ISO 3166 code: IRN

Tazehnab-e Olya (Persian: تازه‌ناب علیا, also Romanized as Tāzehnāb-e ‘Olyā and Tāzeh Nāb-e ‘Olya; also known as Tāzeh Nāb-e Bālā, Tāznāb, Tāznāb-e Bālā, and Tāznāb-e ‘Olyā) is a village in Shaban Rural District, in the Central District of Nahavand County, Hamadan Province, Iran. At the 2006 census, its population was 296, in 79 families.
