= Tazehnab-e Sofla =

Tazehnab-e Sofla تازه‌ناب سفلی
- Village
- Location within Iran
- Coordinates: 34°05′52″N 48°18′55″E
- Country: Iran
- Province: Hamadan
- County: Nahavand
- Bakhsh: Central
- Rural District: Shaban

Population (2006)
  - Total: 122
- Time zone: UTC+3:30 (IRST)
  - Summer (DST): UTC+4:30 (IRDT)

Tazehnab-e Sofla (Persian: تازه‌ناب سفلی, also Romanized as Tāzehnāb-e Soflá; also known as Tāzānaū, Tāzānū, Tazeh Nāb, Tāzeh Nāb-e Pā’īn, Tāzenāb, Taznāb, Tāznāb, Tāznāb-e Pā’īn, Tāznāb-e Soflá, and Tāznāb Tāf) is a village in Shaban Rural District, in the Central District of Nahavand County, Hamadan Province, Iran. At the 2006 census, its population was 122, in 33 families.
