= Hewett =

Hewett may refer to:

- Hewett (surname)
- Hewett, Wisconsin, a town in the United States
- Hewett, South Australia, a town
- Hewett gas field, UK natural gas field
- The Hewett Academy, formerly the Hewett School, Norwich, UK

== See also ==
- Hewitt (disambiguation)
