= Hyatt Howe Waggoner =

American professor of English (1913–1988)

Hyatt Howe Waggoner (November 19, 1913, Pleasant Valley, New York – October 13, 1988, Hanover, New Hampshire) was a professor of English. He is today best known for his work on Nathaniel Hawthorne, especially Hawthorne's Selected Tales and Sketches (1950), Hawthorne: A Critical Study (1956) and The Presence of Hawthorne (1979), and in 1978 played a pivotal role in the authentication of the novelist's "lost notebook". In the year of Waggoner's death, he was honoured with the House of Seven Gables Hawthorne Award. He did not, however, confine his output to one author: "I've moved around the field", he declared, "at the risk of being superficial." Among the other literary figures who incurred his attention were Ralph Waldo Emerson, Robert Frost, Walt Whitman and William Faulkner.

== Biography ==
Waggoner was born in Pleasant Valley, New York, on November 19, 1913. In his youth he attended a single-room school in upstate New York, and later Middlebury College, where out of the science-religion conflict he found fully his Christian faith, writing to his Presbyterian pastor that he could not go on as merely a "nominal Christian".

The year after his 1935 graduation from Middlebury, he received his master's degree from the University of Chicago, and in 1939 began teaching at the University of Omaha. He left Omaha in 1942 when he took his Ph.D. from Ohio State University. From 1942 to 1956, he was a professor at the University of Kansas City, whose English department he headed from 1952 to the end of his tenure, when he transferred to Brown University. John Shroeder, one of his students at Kansas, who later became a Brown English professor himself, recalled of Waggoner's lectures:

Hyatt had small classes. He taught in his office, sitting behind his desk. There were no pyrotechnics, but he was inspiring. He had new and startling ideas about literary matters [...]. He set people up well enough to continue for themselves. And he was what students are always hoping for in a professor. I always felt free to drop in on him and talk about literary matters for two hours. He was always available. He gave exams on the porch of his house and served beer. I make him sound sugary and sweet. He is really a cranky Yankee.

Waggoner went to a Unitarian Church in the 1940s but in the 1950s was Episcopalian. In 1943, he wrote a paper in the journal American Literature, exploring (without reference to its relevance in his own life) the effect of the incompatibility of science and theology on T. S. Eliot. A lover of nature, with a fondness for camping and hiking, he finally found a permanent home for his religious bent at a small federated church near his farmhouse in Rochester, Vermont. Here he wrote his books during summer holidays and sabbaticals, devoting all his time during the school year to his courses and students. His first authorial foray, The Heel of Elohim: Science and Values in Modern American Poetry, much along the same lines as the Eliot paper, was published in 1950, and William Faulkner: From Jefferson to the World followed in 1959, along with American Poets: From the Puritans to the Present (1968, a tome of 740 pages which emerged from one of his courses), Emerson as Poet (1974) and American Visionary Poetry (1982). He directed the American Civilization program all through the 1960s and retired from teaching in 1979.

== Bibliography ==
- Waggoner, Hyatt Howe. "T. S. Eliot and the Hollow Men." American Literature, 1943: 101–126.
