= Pir Hayati, Kermanshah =

Pir Hayati پیرحیاتی
- Village
- Location within Iran
- Coordinates: 34°25′27″N 47°01′58″E
- Country: Iran
- Province: Kermanshah
- County: Kermanshah
- Bakhsh: Central
- Rural District: Miyan Darband

Population (2006)
  - Total: 201
- Time zone: UTC+3:30 (IRST)
  - Summer (DST): UTC+4:30 (IRDT)

Pir Hayati (Persian: پیرحیاتی, also Romanized as Pīr Ḩayātī) is a village in Miyan Darband Rural District, in the Central District of Kermanshah County, Kermanshah Province, Iran. At the 2006 census, its population was 201, in 47 families.
