= Senator Hyatt =

Senator Hyatt may refer to:

- Campbell C. Hyatt (1880–1945), Virginia state senator
- James W. Hyatt (1837–1893), Connecticut state senator
