= Regina Khayatt =

Egyptian educator, feminist, suffragist, and temperance worker (1881–1942)

- Born: Regina Wissa; October 11, 1881; Assiout, Upper Egypt, Egypt
- Died: 1942 (aged 60–61)
- Children: Dora Khayatt

Regina Khayatt (née Wissa; 1881–1942) was an Egyptian educator, philanthropist, feminist, suffragist, and temperance worker. She was the founder and president of the National Woman's Christian Training Center, founder of the Egyptian Young Women's Christian Association YWCA, and a founding member of the Egyptian Feminist Union (EFU).

== Biography ==
Regina Wissa was born at Assiout, Upper Egypt, October 11, 1881. She was a member of the Wissa family, who owned extensive lands in the Nile Delta's Faiyum Oasis. Her father was Wissa Boctor Wissa and her mother was Angelina Saifi. She was educated in the Pressly Memorial Institute for Girls, directed by the American Presbyterian Mission.

In 1896, she married Dr. Habib Khayatt Bey, of Cairo, an Egyptian Senator. The Khayatt and the Wissa families were Copts.

Khayatt was actively interested in political and social questions. She was a leader in the movement for emancipation of the women of her country. She was the founder and president of the National Woman's Christian Training Center, a member of the Woman's International Suffrage Alliance, treasurer of the Woman's Political Society, and a committee member of the Societe de la Nouvelle Femme d’Egypt, Societe de Puericulture, and Mohamed Aly Dispensary for Child Welfare. She was also treasurer of the Woman's Christian Temperance Union of Egypt and a leader in the movement to secure Prohibition in that country.

In 1923, she served as director of the YWCA's Cairo branch. In 1926, she founded the Egyptian YWCA.

Regina Khayatt died in 1942. Her daughter, Dora Khayatt, was a noted painter.

== See also ==
- Feminism in Egypt
