= Hayat Kabasakal =

Turkish management academic

- Born: Hayat Enbiyaoğlu

Academic background
- Education: Boğaziçi University (BA, MBA); University of Minnesota (PhD)
- Thesis: Relationship among entrepreneur's previous experiences, business planning, business idea and company performance (1984)

Academic work
- Discipline: Management
- Sub-discipline: Leadership, culture, gender, disaster management, organizational behavior
- Institutions: Boğaziçi University

Hayat Kabasakal (née Enbiyaoğlu) is a Turkish management academic researching leadership, culture, gender, disaster management, and organizational behavior. She is a professor in the management department at Boğaziçi University.

== Education ==
Hayat Enbiyaoğlu completed a B.A. (1978) and a M.B.A. (1979) in the management department of the faculty of economics and administrative sciences at Boğaziçi University. In 1979, she was awarded a Fulbright scholarship for her doctoral studies. In 1984, Enbiyaoğlu earned a Ph.D. in business administration with a minor in psychology in the Carlson School of Management's department of strategic management and organization at the University of Minnesota. Her dissertation was titled Relationship among entrepreneur's previous experiences, business planning, business idea and company performance. Her doctoral advisor was A. K. Wickesberg.

== Career and research ==
c joined Boğaziçi University as an assistant professor in the management department in 1984. She served as associate dean of the faculty of economics and administrative sciences from 1989 to 1991. Kabasakal was promoted to associate professor in 1989 and professor in 1995.

Kabasakal researches leadership, culture, gender, disaster management, and organizational behavior.
