= Hiatt, Missouri =

Extinct hamlet in Missouri, U.S.

Coordinates: 37.3122707°N 92.7043378°W

Hiatt is an extinct town in Webster County, in the U.S. state of Missouri.

A post office called Hiatt was established in 1899, and remained in operation until 1905. The community has the name of the local Hiatt family.
