= Sidi Abdallah Al Khayat =

Sidi Abdallah Al Khayat سيدي عبد الله الخياط
- Rural commune and town
- Location within Morocco
- Coordinates: 34.0019°N 5.3695°W
- Country: Morocco
- Region: Fès-Meknès
- Prefecture: Meknès Prefecture

Population (2004)
  - Total: 10,014
- Time zone: UTC+0 (GMT)

Sidi Abdallah Al Khayat is a small town and rural commune in Meknès Prefecture of the Fès-Meknès region of Morocco. At the time of the 2004 census, the commune had a total population of 10,014 people living in 1678 households.
