= Hayat Mirshad =

Lebanese activist

- Born: 1988 (age 36–37)
- Citizenship: Lebanon
- Education: Lebanese University (BA); Lebanese American University (GDHA)
- Occupation: Feminist journalist
- Organization: FE-MALE
- Website: Personal website; Instagram; Twitter; FE-MALE website

Hayat Mirshad (born 1988) is a Lebanese feminist journalist, activist, and co-founder of the non-profit feminist collective FE-MALE. She was born to a Lebanese Druze family.

== Education ==
Mirshad holds a BA in English literature from the Lebanese University and a Gender in Development and Humanitarian Assistance (GDHA) Diploma from the Lebanese American University–Beirut, the latter being a continuing education program at LAU's Institute for Women's Studies in the Arab World (IWSAW).

== Activism ==
Mirshad founded the first feminist radio program in Lebanon in 2012, called "Sharika wa Laken" (A Partner Not Yet Equal), where she serves as editor-in-chief. In 2007, she co-founded the non-profit feminist collective FE-MALE where she remains a co-director. Mirshad is also the head of communications at the Lebanese Women Democratic Gathering and a member of the UN Women's Youth Gender Innovation Agora. She also works with the Men and Women for Gender Equality programme at the UN Women's Regional Office for the Arab States, a project funded by the Swedish International Development Cooperation Agency to research the root causes of gender inequalities in the region and address them using a bottom-up approach.

Mirshad advocates for girls and women to have access to justice, information, protection, and human rights, both online and offline by organizing nationwide marches, rallying support against corrupt, patriarchal regimes.

== Awards ==
In 2020, Mirshad was recognized by the BBC's 100 women 2020. This is recognition as one of the Top 100 influential and inspiring women of the year for her work as the director of FE-MALE.
