= Douar Ain Chami =

Settlement in northwestern Morocco somewhat to the north of the city of Meknes

Coordinates: 34°04′N 5°37′W

Douar Ain Chami is a settlement in northwestern Morocco somewhat to the north of the city of Meknes. Douar Ain Chami is situated slightly west of the ancient city of Volubilis, where the earliest recorded history of this locale is embedded; Volubilis was initially settled by the Phoenicians and Romans over 2000 years ago.

== See also ==
- Bou Assel
- El Kouar
