= Meknes Prefecture =

Coordinates: 33.8950°N 5.5547°W

Meknes Prefecture عمالة مكناس ⵜⴰⵎⵏⴱⴰⴹⵜ ⵏ ⵎⴽⵏⴰⵙ
- Prefecture
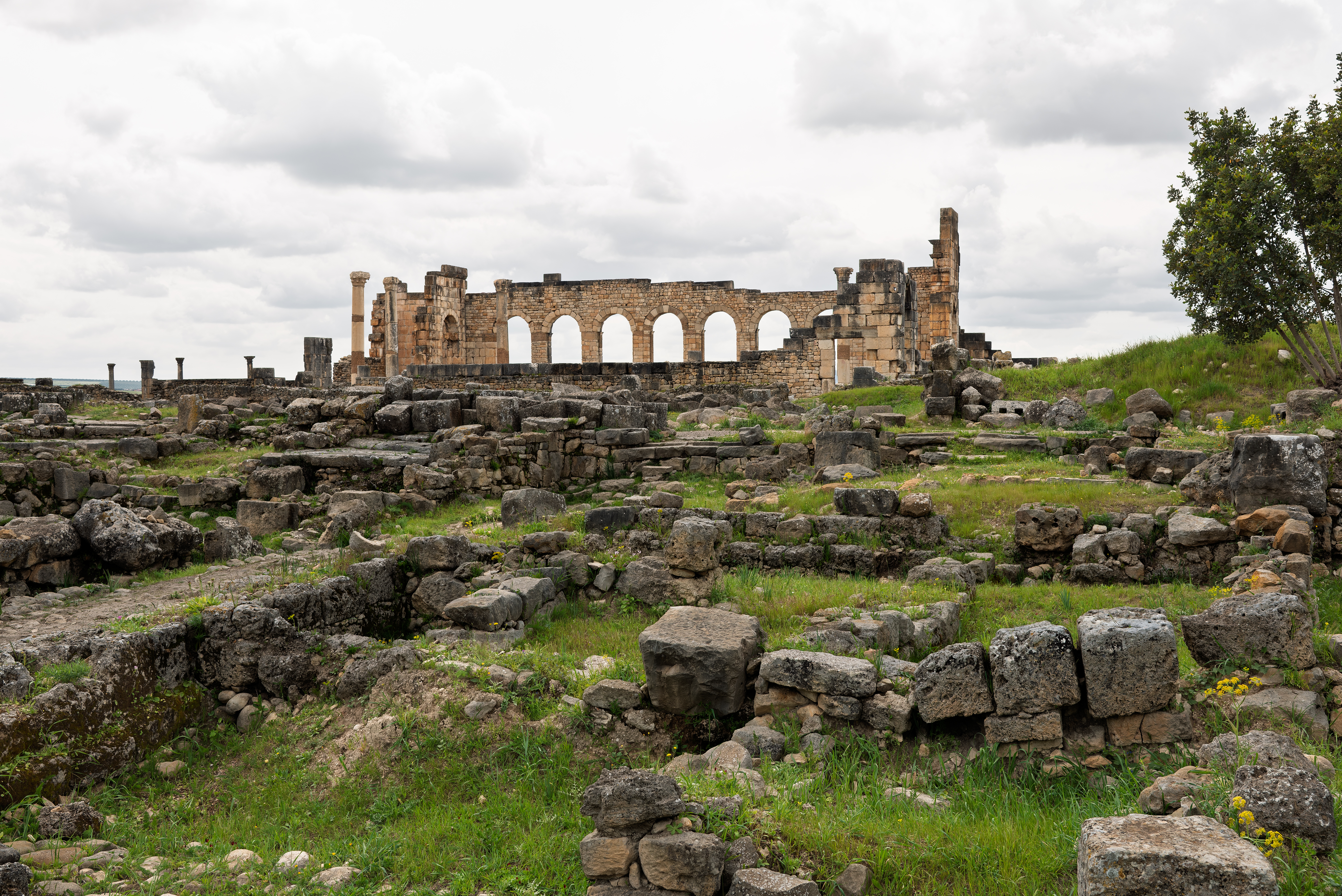
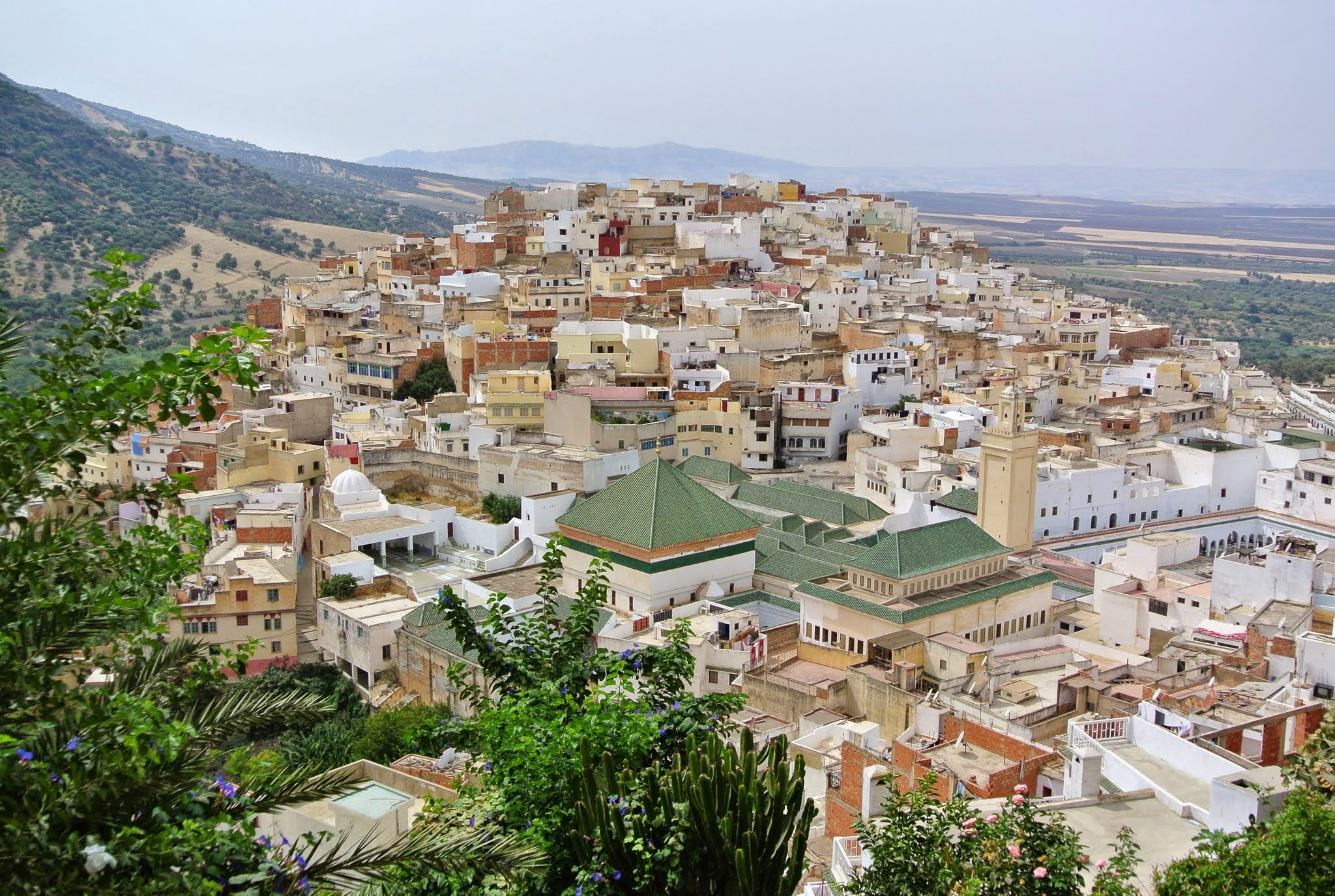
- the Ruins of Volubilis Moulay Idriss Zerhoun Sidi Chahed dam

- Flag
- Interactive map of Meknes Prefecture
- Country: Morocco
- Region: Fez-Meknes
- Seat: Meknes

Area
  - Total: 1,786 km^{2} (690 sq mi)

Population (2024)
  - Total: 930,428
  - Density: 521.0/km^{2} (1,349/sq mi)

Meknes Prefecture is an urbanised administrative subdivision of Morocco, located in the Fez-Meknes region. It was formed in 2003 through the merger of the former prefectures of Meknès-El Menzeh and Al Ismaïlia. Its capital is the city of Meknes.

== Geography ==
Meknes Prefecture is situated in north-central Morocco, within the Saïss plain. It is characterized by a predominantly urban territory centered around the city of Meknes, one of the country’s major historical and economic centers.

The prefecture lies in an agricultural region known for its fertile lands and proximity to important transport routes linking northern and central Morocco.

== History ==
The current administrative entity of Meknes Prefecture was established in 2003 as part of a reorganization of territorial divisions in Morocco, through the consolidation of the prefectures of Meknès-El Menzeh and Al Ismaïlia.

The city of Meknes, which serves as its administrative center, has a long history dating back to medieval times and reached its peak during the reign of Moulay Ismail in the 17th century, when it became one of the imperial capitals of Morocco.

== Administrative divisions ==
Communes of Meknes Prefecture

The prefecture is divided administratively into the following:

| Name | Geographic code | Type | Households | Population (2004) | Foreign population | Moroccan population | Notes |
|---|---|---|---|---|---|---|---|
| Meknes | 061.01.01. | Municipality | 100470 | 469169 | 909 | 468260 | |
| Al Machouar - Stinia | 061.01.03. | Municipality | 1327 | 5387 | 14 | 5373 | |
| Boufakrane | 061.01.05. | Municipality | 1376 | 6326 | 4 | 6322 | |
| Toulal | 061.01.07. | Municipality | 2896 | 13852 | 5 | 13847 | |
| Moulay Driss Zerhoun | 061.01.09. | Municipality | 2906 | 12611 | 6 | 12605 | |
| Ouislane | 061.01.11. | Municipality | 9327 | 47824 | 12 | 47812 | |
| Ain Orma | 061.03. | Cercle | | | | | |
| Ain Jemaa | 061.03.01. | Rural commune | 1893 | 13146 | 2 | 13144 | 2610 residents live in the center, called Ain Jemaa; 10536 residents live in rural areas. |
| Ain Karma | 061.03.03. | Rural commune | 1674 | 9738 | 0 | 9738 | 3828 residents live in the center, called Ain Karma; 5910 residents live in rural areas. |
| Ain Orma | 061.03.05. | Rural commune | 731 | 3716 | 0 | 3716 | |
| Ait Ouallal | 061.03.07. | Rural commune | 1039 | 5455 | 5 | 5450 | |
| Dar Oum Soltane | 061.03.09. | Rural commune | 915 | 6104 | 4 | 6100 | |
| Oued Rommane | 061.03.11. | Rural commune | 897 | 6076 | 0 | 6076 | |
| Meknès Banlieue | 061.05. | Cercle | | | | | |
| Dkhissa | 061.05.01. | Rural commune | 2476 | 13541 | 3 | 13538 | |
| Majjate | 061.05.03. | Rural commune | 1590 | 8514 | 9 | 8505 | |
| M'Haya | 061.05.05. | Rural commune | 3410 | 21112 | 2 | 21110 | 3952 residents live in the center, called M Haya; 17160 residents live in rural areas. |
| Oued Jdida | 061.05.07. | Rural commune | 2309 | 13634 | 1 | 13633 | |
| Sidi Slimane Moul Al Kifane | 061.05.09. | Rural commune | 2769 | 15136 | 3 | 15133 | 4362 residents live in the center, called Haj Kaddour; 10774 residents live in rural areas. |
| Zerhoun | 061.07. | Cercle | | | | | |
| Charqaoua | 061.07.01. | Rural commune | 797 | 5540 | 0 | 5540 | |
| Karmet Ben Salem | 061.07.03. | Rural commune | 842 | 4180 | 0 | 4180 | |
| Mrhassiyine | 061.07.05. | Rural commune | 1621 | 7774 | 0 | 7774 | |
| N'Zalat Bni Amar | 061.07.07. | Rural commune | 1780 | 8609 | 0 | 8609 | 1070 residents live in the center, called N'Zalat Bni Amar; 7539 residents live in rural areas. |
| Oualili | 061.07.09. | Rural commune | 1186 | 6151 | 0 | 6151 | |
| Sidi Abdallah Al Khayat | 061.07.11. | Rural commune | 1678 | 10014 | 0 | 10014 | |
