= Pir Hayati-ye Vosta =

Village in Kermanshah, Iran

Pir Hayati-ye Vosta پیرحیاتی وسطی
- Village
- Location within Iran
- Coordinates: 34°17′00″N 46°46′00″E
- Country: Iran
- Province: Kermanshah
- County: Kermanshah
- Bakhsh: Mahidasht
- Rural District: Mahidasht

Population (2006)
  - Total: 91
- Time zone: UTC+3:30 (IRST)
  - Summer (DST): UTC+4:30 (IRDT)

Pir Hayati-ye Vosta (Persian: پیرحیاتی وسطی, also Romanized as Pīr Ḩayātī-ye Vosţá) is a village in Mahidasht Rural District, Mahidasht District, Kermanshah County, Kermanshah Province, Iran. At the 2006 census, its population was 91, in 21 families.
