= Elizabeth Hyatt =

Union nurse and ambulance driver during the American Civil War

Elizabeth Ann Hyatt
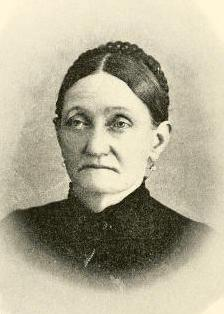
- Hyatt, from an 1897 publication
- Occupation: Driver of a horse-drawn ambulance
- Known for: Nurse during the American Civil War
- Spouse: Asa W. Hyatt

Elizabeth Ann Hyatt was a Union nurse and ambulance driver during the American Civil War.

== Civil War service ==
Hyatt's service in the war began when her husband enlisted in 1861. He enlisted in the 4th Regiment of the Wisconsin Volunteers, and Hyatt found much work to do in the camp before the regiment left for battle. As the regiment received orders to depart southward, Hyatt began to leave but the hospital doctor asked her to stay and to serve. Ultimately, Hyatt departed with the regiment to Baltimore, Maryland.

Hyatt served mostly in the Patterson Park Hospital in Ward 11. She had twenty-two soldiers under her care at most times, but she also made it her duty to cheer up the soldiers as well. She would tell stories of Jefferson Davis's capture and the Confederacy's defeat to motivate. When the regiment was ordered to Ship Island, Mississippi, Hyatt went with them. There she was deputized to drive a horse-drawn ambulance.

Hyatt served Ward 11 until December 1862. During this time, there was only one death under her care.

== Personal life ==
Elizabeth A. Hyatt was married to Asa W. Hyatt. She was a widow living in Michigan in 1900, when an increase in her war pension was approved by an Act of Congress.
