= Shaukat Hayat =

Indian writer (1950–2021)

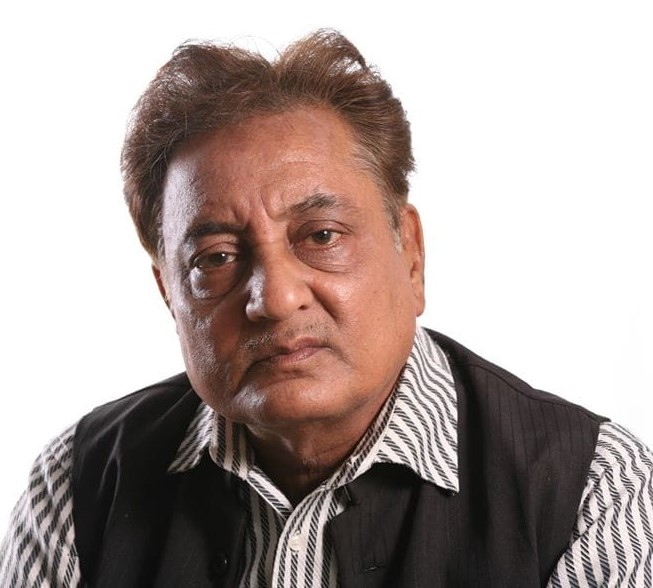
- Shaukat Hayat
- Born: 1 December 1950
- Died: 21 April 2021 (aged 70)
- Occupations: President, Pragmatic Writers Guild
- Years active: 1970–2021
- Spouse: Irshad Parween
- Children: Ana Hayat (daughter); Atam Hayat (son)
- Parents: Syed Mahfoozul Haque (father); Qamrun Nisa (mother)

Shaukat Hayat (Urdu : شوکت حیات) (1 December 1950 – 21 April 2021), was a modern and post-modern Indian writer who wrote in Urdu, Hindi. His stories often include allegory, flat narration and sometimes core values of the progressive movement, and sometimes deviate from storytelling altogether. He is best known for his story "Gumbad ke Kabutar".

== Early life and education ==
Hayat was born in Patna, Bihar, India. He graduated in Science from the Patna University Science College in 1970 and later pursued his Masters (Gold Medalist) in Urdu from Magadh University. He was UGC(Net Qualified).

== Career ==
Hayat's "Gumbad ke Kabutar" received acclaim from veteran critics of Urdu, including Mehdi Jafar and Waris Alvi, who praised his mastery over literature and language. Hayat's stories are about social, political and economic realities; the pain, loneliness and disappointment that may be found in a few of his stories are the reflection of his experiences in life, all he has gone through. Joginder Pal in his book New Urdu Fictions names Hayat as "the innovator of new trend of Urdu Fiction referred to as 'Anaam Kahani', that is, 'The Nameless Story.'"

As of 2014 Hayat was the President of "Pragmatic Writers Guild, Patna" and his stories are taught in post graduate courses at various universities in India and abroad.

== Achievements ==
Hayat is recipient of "Katha Award" in the year 1996 for his story "Gumbad Ke Kabootar". The story was later translated in English by Dr. Sara Rai titled "Pigeons of the dome". The English translation of this story is included in the book The Eastern brew by Syed Sarwar Husain. The same story has also been included as the cover story & title for the Rakshanda Jalil's book for which she took special permission from him. Hayat is also recipient of "Lifetime Achievement Award" from Bihar Urdu Academy in 2010. A few of his stories which are used as a reference & benchmark in modern Urdu literature are viz."Baang", "Dhalaan Pe Ruke Hue Kadam", "Koobad", "Mr.Glad", "Maadhav", "Shikanja" etc. His novelette Sarpat Ghoda received wide critical acclaim.

== Death ==
Hayat died on 21 April 2021. He was survived by his wife, one son and a daughter.

== Bibliography ==
- Baang (Collection of Short Stories,1976)
- Afsaana Workshop Me Shaukat Hayat (Essays,1985)
- Gumbad Ke Kabootar (Collection of Short Stories, 2010)
