= El Kouar =

Settlement in Morocco

Coordinates: 34°04′N 5°31′W

El Kouar or Mers el Koar is a settlement in Tangier-Assilah Prefecture, Morocco.
