= Hewitt =

Hewitt may refer to:

== Places ==
United Kingdom

- Hewitt (hill), Hills in England, Wales and Ireland over two thousand feet with a relative height of at least 30 metres

United States

- Hewitt, Minnesota, a city
- Hewitt, New Jersey, in Passaic County
- Hewitt, Texas, a city
- Hewitt, Marathon County, Wisconsin, a town
- Hewitt, Wood County, Wisconsin, a village
- Hewitt Quadrangle, on the campus of Yale University

== Other uses ==
- Hewitt (name)
- USS Hewitt, US Navy destroyer
- SS Hewitt, ship that went missing in 1921
- Hewitt Associates, global human resources outsourcing and consulting firm
- G. W. & W. D. Hewitt, architectural firm

== See also ==
- Hewett (disambiguation)
