= Howard Hiatt =

American medical researcher (1925–2024)

- Born: Howard Haym Hiatt; July 22, 1925; Patchogue, New York, U.S.
- Died: March 2, 2024 (aged 98); Cambridge, Massachusetts, U.S.
- Education: Harvard College; Harvard Medical School (MD, 1948)
- Occupations: biomedical researcher, medical educator, hospitalist, human rights advocate
- Known for: Dean, Harvard School of Public Health (1972-1984); discovery, messenger RNA; founder, Center for Global Health Equity, Brigham and Women's Hospital
- Spouse: Doris Bieringer (m. 1947; died 2007)
- Children: 3; including Fred
- Website: Brigham and Women's Hospital: Howard Hiatt

Howard Haym Hiatt (July 22, 1925 – March 2, 2024) was an American medical researcher involved with the discovery of messenger RNA. He was the onetime chair of the department of medicine at Beth Israel Hospital in Boston from 1963 to 1972. He was dean of the Harvard School of Public Health from 1972 to 1984. He was co-founder and associate chief of the Division of Social Medicine and Health Inequalities at the Brigham and Women's Hospital, and was also the Associate Chief of the hospital's Division of Global Health Equity. He was a founding head of the cancer division of Beth Israel Hospital (now Beth Israel Deaconess Medical Center). He was a member of the team at the Pasteur Institute, Paris, led by François Jacob and Jacques Monod, which first identified and described messenger RNA, and he was part of the team led by James Watson that was among the first to demonstrate messenger RNA in mammalian cells.

Hiatt was married for 60 years to Doris Bieringer, a librarian who co-founded a reference publication for high-school libraries.

Hiatt was a member of the Board of Sponsors of the Bulletin of the Atomic Scientists.

== Early life and education ==
Howard Haym Hiatt was born in Patchogue, New York, in 1925 to a Jewish family. His father was an immigrant from Lithuania who lost much of his family in the Holocaust; he immigrated alone to the United States, where he changed his surname to "Hiatt" from "Chaitowicz" at Ellis Island. Howard enrolled in Harvard College in 1944, and received his medical degree in 1948 from the Harvard Medical School. He was trained in clinical medicine, biochemistry, and molecular biology.

== Career ==
Hiatt was a Harvard University faculty member beginning in 1955. Hiatt was the first Blumgart Professor of Medicine at Harvard Medical School, as well as the physician-in-chief at Beth Israel Hospital in Boston, from 1963 to 1972. During his tenure there, Beth Israel became one of the first teaching hospitals to translate molecular and cell biology to clinical problems and to develop teaching and research programs in primary care. In 1972, Hiatt was planning to go to Yale as the dean of its medical school, when the then-new president of Harvard University asked him to stay as dean of the Harvard School of Public Health. While he was dean from 1972 to 1984, the school strengthened and greatly broadened its work in quantitative analytic sciences, introduced molecular and cell biology into its research and teaching, began its program in health policy and management—the first in a public health school, and promoted integration of its teaching and research programs with those in other Harvard Faculties. As of 1985, he was Professor of Medicine at Harvard Medical School and Senior Physician at Brigham and Women's Hospital. He helped develop the Research Training in Clinical Effectiveness Program, which trains physicians to carry out research on issues of quality and costs of medical care. His later research concerned social aspects of health. He helped launch and for his last ten years was Associate Chief of the Division of Global Health Equity. Hiatt was a member of the Board of Directors of Partners in Health and a member emeritus of the Task Force for Global Health. An accomplished physician, researcher, mentor, and teacher, and a leader in the field of human rights, his work was widely published and often appeared in both scholarly and lay publications.

== Publications ==
Hiatt had numerous research articles in publications such as the Journal of Molecular Biology, Journal of Biological Chemistry, the New England Journal of Medicine, and the Journal of the American Medical Association. He wrote for the lay press in areas of disease prevention, health services, and the health implications of the nuclear arms race. His book, Medical Lifeboat: Will There Be Room for You in the Health Care System? (published in January 1989 by Harper & Row) outlined methods for addressing some very basic problems of the American healthcare system.

== Personal life ==
Hiatt was married to Doris Bieringer, a librarian who co-founded a reference publication for high-school libraries, from 1947 until her death in 2007. His father-in-law, Walter H. Bieringer, was active in the Boston area's Jewish Community Council. Beringer served as president of the United Service for New Americans which helped to resettle European Jews in the United States after World War II. Hiatt also served as vice-president of the Associated Jewish Philanthropies of Boston, and as a member of a presidential committee. This committee advised the Truman Administration on displaced persons before being named Head of Massachusetts Commission on Refugees in 1957. Hiatt died from pulmonary hypertension at his home in Cambridge, Massachusetts, on March 2, 2024, at the age of 98.

== Awards ==
In 2011, Dartmouth College awarded Hiatt an honorary Doctor of Science (D.Sc.) degree, noting his long career devoted to "improving health care services through care, teaching, research, and advocacy".

== See also ==
- Comparative effectiveness research
- Messenger RNA
