= Pir Hayati-ye Olya =

Village in Kermanshah, Iran

Pir Hayati-ye Olya پیرحیاتی علیا
- Village
- Location within Iran
- Coordinates: 34°16′04″N 46°48′20″E
- Country: Iran
- Province: Kermanshah
- County: Kermanshah
- Bakhsh: Mahidasht
- Rural District: Mahidasht

Population (2006)
  - Total: 91
- Time zone: UTC+3:30 (IRST)
  - Summer (DST): UTC+4:30 (IRDT)

Pir Hayati-ye Olya (Persian: پیرحیاتی علیا, also Romanized as Pīr Ḩayātī-ye ‘Olyā; also known as Kahfri, Kofrī, and Pīr Hayātī-ye Bālā) is a village in Mahidasht Rural District, Mahidasht District, Kermanshah County, Kermanshah Province, Iran. At the 2006 census, its population was 91, in 20 families.
