= Fred Hiatt =

American journalist (1955–2021)

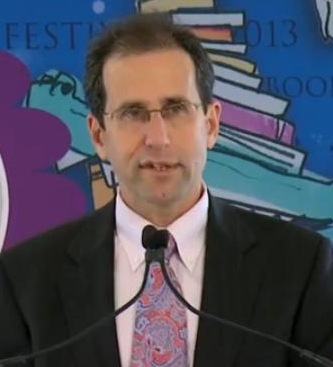
- Speaking at the 2013 National Book Festival
- Born: Frederick Samuel Hiatt; April 30, 1955; Washington, D.C., U.S.
- Died: December 6, 2021 (aged 66); New York City, U.S.
- Education: Harvard University
- Occupations: Journalist; editor
- Years active: 1977–2021
- Known for: Editorial page editor, The Washington Post (1999–2021)
- Spouse: Margaret Shapiro (m. 1984)
- Children: 3
- Parents: Howard Hiatt (father); Doris Bieringer (mother)

Frederick Samuel Hiatt (April 30, 1955 – December 6, 2021) was an American journalist. He was the editorial page editor of The Washington Post, where he oversaw the newspaper's opinion pages and wrote editorials and a biweekly column. He was part of the Post team that won the 2022 Pulitzer Prize in Public Service.

== Early life and education ==
Hiatt was born in Washington, D.C., the son of Howard Hiatt, a medical researcher, and Doris Bieringer, a librarian who co-founded a reference publication for high school libraries. He is Jewish. Hiatt grew up in Brookline, Massachusetts, after his father was named dean of the Harvard School of Public Health.

Many relatives of his paternal grandfather were killed during the Holocaust. His maternal grandfather, Walter H. Bieringer, served as president of the United Service for New Americans which helped to resettle European Jews in the United States after World War II, and served as vice-president of the Associated Jewish Philanthropies of Boston and as a member of a presidential committee, which advised the Truman administration on displaced persons before being named Head of Massachusetts Commission on Refugees in 1957.

He attended Harvard University, where he wrote at least 22 articles for The Harvard Crimson and graduated in 1977. Hiatt was married to Washington Post editor and writer Margaret "Pooh" Shapiro from 1984 until his death; the couple lived in Chevy Chase, Maryland, and had three children.

== Career ==
=== Reporter ===
Hiatt first reported for The Atlanta Journal and The Washington Star. When the latter ceased publication in 1981, Hiatt was hired by The Washington Post. At the Post, Hiatt initially reported on government, politics, development and other topics in Fairfax County and statewide in Virginia. After joining the newspaper's national staff, he later covered military and national security affairs. From 1987 to 1990, he and his wife served as co-bureau chiefs of the Post's Tokyo bureau. Following this, from 1991 to 1995, the couple served as correspondents and co-bureau chiefs in Moscow.

=== Editorial page editor ===
In 1996, Hiatt joined The Post's editorial board. In 1999 Hiatt was a finalist for the Pulitzer Prize for what the prize committee called "his elegantly-written editorials urging America's continued commitment to international human rights issues." In 2000, following the death of long-time editor Meg Greenfield and a short interim editorship under Stephen S. Rosenfeld, Hiatt was named editorial page editor.

The Post's editorial board prior to Hiatt's appointment was described by then-editor Meg Greenfield as collectively having "the sensibility of 1950s liberals," by which she meant that it was generally conservative on foreign policy and national defense and generally liberal on social issues.

Under Hiatt's editorship, the Post added many new columnists of varying ideologies, including Eugene Robinson and Kathleen Parker (both of whom won Pulitzer Prizes for their Post work), Anne Applebaum, Michael Gerson, Ruth Marcus and Harold Meyerson. Hiatt also intensified the online presence of The Washington Post's opinions sections with the addition of bloggers such as Greg Sargent, Jennifer Rubin, Alexandra Petri, and Jonathan Capehart.

During this time The Post also assumed traditionally conservative positions on several major issues: economically, it defended a Republican initiative to allow Social Security personal retirement accounts, and advocated for several free trade agreements. On environmental issues, The Post supported the controversial Keystone XL Tar Sands Pipeline, and Hiatt himself came under fire for refusing to hold Post columnist George F. Will accountable for misrepresenting scientific evidence in a column in which Will attacked the veracity of global warming. The column drew criticism from several other Post columnists, The Post's scientific reporters, and The Post's ombudsman, as well as from environmental scientists and climatologists.

Several media commentators expressed the view that The Post's editorial position under Hiatt moved towards a neoconservative position on foreign policy issues. It supported the 2003 invasion of Iraq; according to PBS journalist Bill Moyers, the paper published 27 editorials in favor of the war in the six months preceding the invasion. Human rights attorney Scott Horton in a blog post for Harper's Magazine, writes that Hiatt presided over a "clear trend" towards neoconservative columnists. Jamison Foser, a senior fellow at the progressive media watchdog group Media Matters for America, said that The Post's editorial stance under Hiatt is now neoconservative on foreign affairs and is no longer liberal on many domestic issues. News anchor and political commentator Chris Matthews stated on his program Hardball that The Post is "not the liberal newspaper it was", but became a "neocon newspaper". Andrew Sullivan, a conservative political blogger for The Atlantic wrote, in response to the sacking of Dan Froomkin, "The way in which the WaPo has been coopted by the neocon right, especially in its editorial pages, is getting more and more disturbing." According to Fox News commentator James Pinkerton, the editorial page of The Post had transformed from a liberal voice into a top ally of the Bush administration in its efforts to invade Iraq: "Remember the days when the Washington Post was the enemy of the Republican administration in the White House? Those days are gone. Today, the neoconservative voice of the Post's editorial page is one of President Bush's most valuable allies."

The former op-ed editor for The Wall Street Journal, Tunku Varadarajan, now a fellow at the conservative Hoover Institution, placed Hiatt fifth in his list of "The Left's Top 25 Journalists" for The Daily Beast and third in the similar list he coauthored for Forbes magazine. Matthew Cooper, White House editor of National Journal magazine, writes that Hiatt "is a bete noir for many liberals because of, among other things, the paper's support of the Iraq War."

The National Journal reported in November 2014, that Hiatt had offered his resignation to Jeff Bezos, the new owner of The Post, but had been retained.

An editorial Hiatt edited on the Jan. 6, 2021 Capitol riot was part of the package that won the 2022 Pulitzer Prize in Public Service. He died before he could receive the honor.

=== Speaker and moderator ===
Hiatt was a member of the Council on Foreign Relations, a foreign policy think tank, and presided over events hosted by the organization.

In December 2009, Hiatt was a featured speaker at the Tokyo Foundation conference entitled "Japan after the Change: Perspectives of Western Opinion Leaders". In October 2010, he moderated a panel on US-Russia relations at the Center for American Progress, a progressive public policy think tank. In 2011, he was a featured speaker at the Aspen Ideas Festival, and a moderator of the "Asianomics" session of the World Knowledge Forum in Seoul, South Korea.

=== Novelist ===
Hiatt wrote The Secret Sun: A Novel of Japan, which was published in 1992, as well as two books for children, If I Were Queen of the World (1997) and Baby Talk (1999). In April 2013, his first novel for young adult audiences, Nine Days, was published. It follows two fictional teenagers on a journey to free an imprisoned Chinese dissident; while the protagonists are fictional, the prisoner and his story are based in reality.

=== Death ===
Hiatt had a history of heart disease. On November 24, 2021, he was hospitalized after going into cardiac arrest in New York City, where he was visiting his daughter. He never regained consciousness and died on December 6, at the age of 66.
