= Malik Asif Hayat =

Pakistani civil servant

Malik Asif Hayat is a former chairman of the Federal Public Service Commission of Pakistan.

== Career ==
President Asif Ali Zardari on the advice of the Prime Minister had appointed Major Malik Asif Hayat as Chairman of the Federal Public Service Commission of Pakistan (FPSC), in view of his vast experience in the civil services.

Before joining the police service in 1975, Hayat served in the Pakistani Army as a Major. After superannuation, he remained employed as Secretary to the President, President's Secretariat (Public), Islamabad. Previously, he remained posted as Secretary, Labour & Manpower Division; Secretary Railways Division; Additional Secretary Prime Minister's Secretariat; Inspector General of Police Punjab; Director General, Federal Investigation Agency (FIA), Islamabad; Inspector General of Police, Government of the Azad Jammu & Kashmir; Deputy Inspector General (Crimes), Government of the Punjab Lahore; Deputy Inspector General, Pakistan Railways Police, Lahore; Deputy Inspector General Police, Government of Khyber Pakhtunkhawa (NWFP), Deputy Director and Joint Director Intelligence Bureau, Islamabad. He also served as Counsellor, Embassy of Pakistan, Abu Dhabi.

Malik Asif Hayat was the first SSP of Islamabad and created the police force for the Capital City. As Secretary Labour & Manpower, he was leader of Pakistan's delegation to International Labour Conference for three consecutive years, and was also member of Pakistan's delegation for conference on managed migration. During his tenure, manpower export agreements were concluded with Korea and Malaysia. EOBI fund was doubled from 80 to 160 billion during his posting as Secretary Labour & Manpower.

In recognition of his services for combating terrorism, Government of Pakistan also awarded Malik Asif Hayat the civil award of Hilal-i-Imtiaz.
