= Hayat Alyaqout =

Kuwaiti writer

- حياة الياقوت
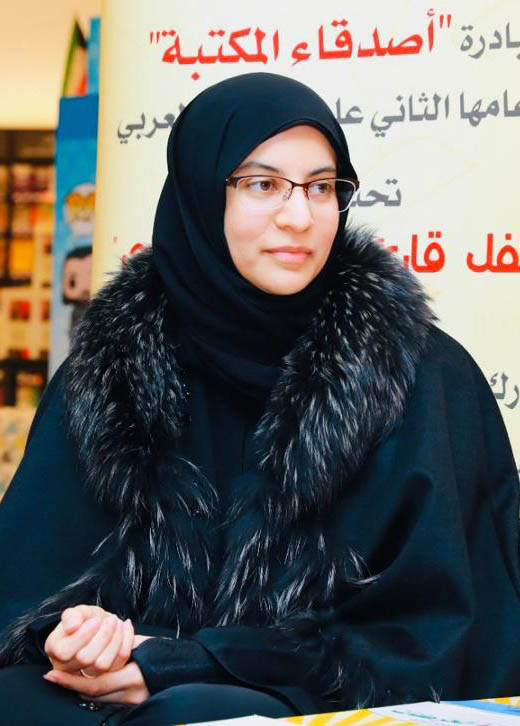
- Hayat Alyaqout.
- Born: 1981 (age 44–45)
- Education: Kuwait University
- Occupations: Writer and publisher
- Writing career
- Language: Modern Standard Arabic

Hayat Alyaqout (Arabic: حياة الياقوت; born 1981) is a Kuwaiti writer and publisher. She founded Nashiri, considered the first Arabic nonprofit online publishing house, in 2003.

== Biography ==
Hayal Alyaqout was born in 1981 in Kuwait. She obtained a bachelor's degree in political science and English from Kuwait University. Alyaqout subsequently graduated with a master's degree in library and information science from the university in 2003, and she has worked as a teaching associate in the information science department.

A freelance writer, Alyaqout began producing articles and stories for Arabic-language publications when she was 17.

In 2003, she founded Nashiri, considered the first Arabic-language nonprofit digital publishing house. It is also described as the first online publishing house in the Persian Gulf. The platform offers free e-book editing and publication for amateur writers. It eventually gained mainstream recognition, receiving multiple awards from the Kuwaiti government, including Salem Al-Ali Al-Sabah's Internet Contest Award in 2005. In addition to serving as Nashiri's editor in chief, Alyaqout has published her own work on the site, including the 2011 story "wa-tas alunī Ribikkā an al-waliyy" ("And Rebecca Asks me about the Wali").

After the success of Nashiri, in 2005, Alyaqout founded the digital magazine I-MAG (short for Islamic Magazine. She led the site as editor in chief until it ceased publication in 2008.

In addition to short stories, Alyaqout has written several novels, the first of which was published in 2011. She has served on the board of directors of the Kuwaiti Writers Association, and she has also worked with the Arab Internet Writers' Union.

Alyaqout is a proponent of the Arabic language, and submissions to Nashiri must be in Modern Standard Arabic and meet certain moral standards. She has also expressed support for government censorship in the name of protecting the youth.

== Publications ==
- Khashoom! A children's story about plastic surgeries. Also translated into English under the title Schnozi!. 2021. Alrubaian Publishing.
- Ya Nisaa Jadilin (Oh Women, Argue). Essays on women's rights. 2019. That Alsalasil Publications.
- Asfaar Dinar (Dinar's Travels). Children’s Story. 2018. Kuwait Awqaf Public Foundation.
- Nutaf. Very Short Stories. 2017. That Alsalasil Publications.
- Afar. Novel. 2016.
- Ghabat Alteen (Mud Forest). Short Stories. 2015. That Alsalasil Publications.
- Kallulu (Like Pearls) . Novel. 2012.
- Alhuroof Takhruj Min Albayt (Letters Get Out of the House). Children's Book. 2012. Wahj Alhayat Publishing.
- Kalamasataan. A series of 4 short stories for children. 2011. Wahj Alhayat Publishing.
- Alice Fi Bilaad Alwaqwaq! Riwayah Laysat Lissighaar (Alice in Waqwaqland! A novel not for children). 2011.
- Man Tha Allathi Qaddada Albayaan? (Who Tore The Eloquence? Photographed Linguistic Mistakes and Sins). 2006.
