= Dora Khayatt =

Egyptian-born painter (1910–1986)

- دورا خياط
- Born: January 18, 1912; Cairo, Egypt
- Died: November 6, 1986 (aged 74); Bryn Mawr, Pennsylvania, United States
- Other names: Dora Khayatt Plant, D. Khayatt, Mrs. John Plant
- Occupation: Visual artist
- Years active: 1948–1986
- Spouse: John Plant
- Parents: Habib Khayatt Bey (father); Regina Wissa (mother)

Dora Khayatt (Arabic: دورا خياط; 1912 – 1986), also known as Dora Khayatt Plant, was an Egyptian-born painter. She was self-taught and known for her work in portraits, landscapes, and seascapes. Khayatt lived in Gladwyne, Pennsylvania for 27 years.

== Early life and family ==
Dora Khayatt was born on January 18, 1912, in Cairo, Egypt. Her father Habib Khayatt Bey was an Egyptian senator. Her mother was Regina Khayatt (née Wissa), an educator, feminist, suffragist, and temperance worker. The family was Christian, and part of the Coptic Orthodox Church. Dora Khayatt started drawing at a young age, and many of her summers in childhood were spent in Paris visiting art museums. She never had any formal painting lessons.

Khayatt and her future husband John Plant met during World War II when he was a Captain in the British Armed Forces serving in Egypt. Plant later worked at Episcopal Academy in Newtown Square, Pennsylvania, as a department chair of classics.

== Art career ==
In 1948 at age 36, she started pursuing art more seriously. She was known for her work in portraits, florals, landscapes, and seascapes. She painted with oils in impasto, and with watercolors.

Her first exhibition was at the British Council in Cairo, where she showed six paintings. In 1949, The Redfern Gallery in London gave her a solo exhibition, in which she successfully sold almost all her displayed works. The Redfern Gallery gave her a second solo exhibition in 1952, followed by a solo show in Paris at Galerie Durand-Ruel in 1956.

In 1957, she and her husband moved to Gladwyne, Pennsylvania, where she remained for 27 years. Her first solo exhibition in the United States was in 1961 at Wildenstein Gallery (now Wildenstein & Company) in New York City. Other solo exhibitions included the Birmingham Museum of Art in 1973, and at the Union League of Philadelphia in 1976.

Her work is included in the collection at Birmingham Museum of Art in Birmingham, Alabama, and the Leicestershire County Council Artworks Collection.

== Death ==
She died on November 6, 1986, at Bryn Mawr Hospital. She was cremated, and her remains were placed in a columbarium at the Church of the Redeemer in Bryn Mawr, Pennsylvania.

== Solo exhibitions ==
- 1948, British Council in Cairo, Cairo, Egypt
- 1949, The Redfern Gallery, London, England
- 1952, The Redfern Gallery, London, England
- 1956, Galerie Durand-Ruel, Paris, France
- 1956, Salon d'Automne, Paris, France
- 1961, Wildenstein Gallery (now Wildenstein & Company), New York City, New York, U.S.
- 1973, Birmingham Museum of Art, Birmingham, Alabama, U.S.
- 1976, Union League of Philadelphia, Philadelphia, Pennsylvania, U.S.
