= Seyyed Ramazan =

Seyyed Ramazan سيدرمضان
- Village
- Location within Iran
- Coordinates: 31°08′43″N 49°11′20″E
- Country: Iran
- Province: Khuzestan
- County: Ahvaz
- Bakhsh: Central
- Rural District: Gheyzaniyeh

Population (2006)
  - Total: 146
- Time zone: UTC+3:30 (IRST)
  - Summer (DST): UTC+4:30 (IRDT)

Seyyed Ramazan (Persian: سيدرمضان, also Romanized as Seyyed Ramaẕān; also known as Hāyeţ) is a village in Gheyzaniyeh Rural District, in the Central District of Ahvaz County, Khuzestan Province, Iran. At the 2006 census, its population was 146, in 26 families.
