= Bakhshi Hayati =

Bakhshi Hayati بخش حياطي
- Village
- Location within Iran
- Coordinates: 38°11′00″N 48°48′00″E
- Country: Iran
- Province: Gilan
- County: Talesh
- Bakhsh: Haviq
- Rural District: Chubar

Population (2006)
  - Total: 74
- Time zone: UTC+3:30 (IRST)
  - Summer (DST): UTC+4:30 (IRDT)

Bakhshi Hayati (Persian: بخش حياطي, also Romanized as Bakhshī Ḩayāţī; also known as Bakhshī Ḩayāţī-ye Chūbar) is a village in Chubar Rural District, Haviq District, Talesh County, Gilan Province, Iran. At the 2006 census, its population was 74, in 14 families.

== Language ==
Linguistic composition of the village.

Bakhshi Hayati linguistic composition
language	percent
Azerbaijani	100%
