= Stanley Portal Hyatt =

English explorer, hunter, and writer

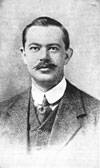
- Hyatt in 1909
- Born: 2 January 1877; Streatham, Surrey, England
- Died: 30 June 1914 (aged 37); Sydenham, London. England
- Education: Dulwich College
- Spouses: Margaret Annie Marston (1908–1912); Charlotte Caroline Key (1914)
- Engineering career
- Significant advance: Opening of Rhodesian trade routes

Stanley Portal Hyatt (2 January 1877 – 30 June 1914) was an English explorer, hunter, and writer. In 1896, Hyatt left his comfortable family home and struck out around the world, arriving in Africa to seek his fortune in 1898. In his written works, Hyatt describes his life and experiences in Australia, Rhodesia and the Philippines. The Old Transport Road and The Diary of a Soldier of Fortune are his best-known works.

== Early life and family ==
Stanley Portal Hyatt was born on 2 January 1877, at The Hawthorns, Mt. Ephraim Road, Streatham, Surrey, England. His parents, Charles James Hyatt and Amy Portal, were both from wealthy Victorian families, their parents having prospered from preaching and trading. He was educated at Dulwich College, but left school early in 1892 after studying engineering. He then spent two years in the workshops of a large engineering firm pioneering electric lighting, before embarking on a career as an explorer.

Hyatt married Margaret Annie Marston on 20 July 1908, in London. After her death in 1912 he married Charlotte Caroline Key on 4 May 1914, in Newton Abbot, Devon.

== Travel to Australia and Africa ==
Before his 18th birthday, Hyatt arrived in New South Wales after a journey of 100 days on a windjammer. He spent a fortnight in Sydney, then took a berth in a large sheep station around 400 miles up-country. He subsequently returned to Sydney, taking up beachcombing to support himself. After a short time working as an engineer, he returned to spend 18 months at home in London, attempting to raise funds for further overseas expeditions by developing new products, none of which were successfully brought to market.

In 1897, Hyatt left home again for Bulawayo (in modern-day Zimbabwe), to seek his fortune in the new gold mines, from where he went on to Matabeleland, remaining there for two years with his brothers, Malcolm and Amyas, working as mine engineers. After initial hardships, Hyatt was appointed as an electrical engineer of the "Geelong", a large reef of white Quartz. The first high-quality gold from the mine was exported in 1898.

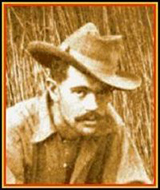
Stanley Portal Hyatt in Rhodesia in 1891

After two years in the mining camp, Hyatt bought a train and a pack donkey and trekked to the borders of Portuguese East Africa, merchant trading and hunting. For the next three years, Hyatt and his brother Amyas established the Hyatt Brothers firm, setting up a trading post at Shona village, and by the end of the Boer War they had made a fortune, including 13,000 acres of rubber-growing land granted to them by the Portuguese Government in return for exploring the India-rubber jungles of Mozambique.

By the age of 22, Hyatt was a prominent trader in Eastern Mashonaland, opening up trade routes across Africa, especially in Mozambique and Rhodesia, where he used his ox carts to supply the trading posts of the white hunters. He explored the central part of Mozambique for the Portuguese, returning to find his business ruined by the East Coast fever (then known as African Coast fever), brought to the region via a herd owned by Cecil Rhodes. A few weeks later, Hyatt's business was ruined, and he wrote later that he and his brother were "only just able to pay our fares out of the miserable country".

Stanley and Amyas Hyatt then struck out in search of rubber, to trade for themselves this time, but failed to find any good sources in the area. In 1903, Hyatt built the first industrial food refrigeration plant in Umtali, on the coast of Rhodesia. Demand for meat had risen during the Boer war, and the export of beef was now the mainstay of trade in the port. After this, he tried his hand at gold prospecting. The Hyatt Brothers remained in Africa a short while longer, but after a further unsuccessful mining venture, they left to ride the tramp steamers around the world.

== Travels in Asia ==
Stanley and Amyas began their way home through East Asia. By lecturing and journalism in Durban, they reached Mauritius, from where they were soon removed as distressed British subjects. In Colombo they lectured and sold newspaper articles, and made it to the Straits Settlements and Manila in the Philippines when the Samar revolt was just breaking out. Hyatt fought as a mercenary for the American Army in the 1904–05 campaign of the Philippine–American War. With assistance from Henry Clarke Corbin, they reached the front, an experience which was detailed in Hyatt's later book, The Little Brown Brother.

The Hyatt brothers' next intended stop was Vladivostok. However, while awaiting transport aboard a blockade runner, Amyas Hyatt was bitten on the cheek by a poisonous insect, and died in a hospital in Manila of Anthrax. Hyatt, shaken by his brother's death, then travelled east to Singapore and China, up the China coast, then to Japan, and finally home to England across the United States.

== Later years ==
Having lost everything, and fallen far behind in his engineering profession, Hyatt went to Fleet Street to seek work as a journalist. However, the success of his first book, Marcus Hay, enabled him to leave newspaper work for fiction. In 1905, he started writing boys' story books of his adventures and books about his travels. By 1910, however, he fell ill as a result of his travels, and became addicted to morphine. He slowly succumbed to malaria, and finally died of tuberculosis on 30 June 1914, in Longton Grove, Sydenham, London.

In his book, The Diary of a Soldier of Fortune, he summarises his experiences as "Engineer, Sheep Station Hand, Nigger Driver, Hunter, Trader, Transport Rider, Labour Agent, Cold Storage Engineer, Explorer, Lecturer, Pressman, American Soldier, Blockade Runner and Tramp".

== Literary works ==
In most of his works, Hyatt describes his life and experiences in Australia, Rhodesia and the Philippines. On his return to England, he struggled to find success with his first novel, Marcus Hay, but soon after this his book The Little Brown Brother, about his time in the Philippines, made him well known in American literary circles. He also wrote a number of short stories for the "Penny dreadful" story magazines of the time, and became a widely read author among young boys in the early 20th century.

=== Major works ===
All of Hyatt's known major works:

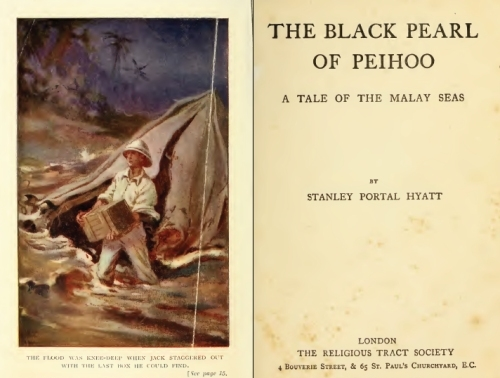

- Marcus Hay [1907]
- The Little Brown Brother [1908] (Note: Issued in 1911 as Daily Mail Sixpenny Novel. No. 141. illustrated by G. H. Evison.)
- The Marriage of Hilary Carden [1909]
- Biffel, a trek Ox [1909]
- The Northward Trek [1909]
- Black Sheep (released as People of Position in the United States) [1910]
- The Diary of a Soldier of Fortune [1910]
- The Law of the Bolo [1910]
- The Land of Promises [1911]
- The Literary Pageant (ed) [1911]
- Off The Main Track [1911]
- The Makers of Mischief [1911]
- Fallen Among Thieves (released as The Markham Affair in the United States) [1913]
- The Way of the Cardines [1913]
- The Old Transport Road [1914]
- The Black Pearl of Peihoo [1914]
- A Man From The Past [1915]
- The Mammoth [1916]

=== Short stories ===
Some of Hyatt's documented short stories:

- The Passengers of the "Corunna" (ss) Cassell's Jul 1909
- The Witch-Lion (ss) Everybody's Weekly 2 Sep 1911
- Dead Ivory, (ss) Boys' Life Jun 1912
- The Chief of the Mountains (ss) Boy's Own Paper 26 Oct 1912
- The Case of the S.S. Patagonia (ss) The Red Magazine 15 Nov 1912
- The Blood-Spoor of the Sable Antelope (ss) Boy's Own Paper 14 Dec 1912
- Snakes I Have Known (ar) Boy's Own Paper 18 Jan 1913
- The Escape of the "Alleynian" (ss) Boy's Own Paper 1 Feb 1913, etc.
- The Gun-Runners. A yarn of the Philippines (ss) Boy's Own Paper 7 Jun 1913, etc.
- The War-Makers (ss) Boy's Own Paper Nov 1913
- The Dead Letter (nv) Tit-Bits Novels 27 Apr 1914
- The Glacier's Secret (nv) Tit-Bits Novels 23 Feb 1914
- The Witchdoctor's Revenge (ss) Boy's Own Paper Feb 1914
- The Black Pearl of Peihoo. A tale of the Malay Seas (sl) Boy's Own Paper Apr 1914, etc.
- Marshal Mora's Revolution (ss) Boy's Own Paper Jun 1914
- On Dangerous Service. A Story of Blockade Running (ss) Boy's Own Paper Nov 1914
- Bushman Reef. A tale of an African mine (ss) Boy's Own Paper Jan 1915
- The Case of Bertram Dantone (ss) New Story Magazine May 1915
- On the Plateau. A story of Mashonaland (ss) Boy's Own Paper May 1915
