= Menahem Manesh Hayyut =

Polish rabbi (died 1636)

Rabbi Menaḥem Manesh Ḥayyut
- מנחם מאניש חיות

Personal life
- Died: c. May 1636 Vilna
- Parent: Isaac ben Abraham Chajes (father)

Religious life
- Religion: Judaism

Jewish leader
- Yahrtzeit: 8 Iyar 5396

Menaḥem Manesh ben Isaac Ḥayyut (Note: Manesh also spelled Manus, Manish, or Mannusch; Chajes also spelled Chajes.) (Hebrew: מנחם מאניש חיות, romanized: Menaḥem Manish Ḥayyut; died 1636) was a Polish rabbi.

He was the son of Rabbi Isaac ben Abraham Ḥayyut, a descendant of a pious Provençal family; his father went to Prague in 1584. It seems that in his younger days, about 1590, he was rabbi of Turobin.

He is the first known rabbi of Vilna, and his tombstone was the oldest in the old Jewish cemetery of that city. The Jewish community of Vilna was established in the last decade of the sixteenth century, and as Abraham Samuel Bacharach of Worms (died 1615) congratulates Ḥayyut on his good position in a far-away place, it is probable that Ḥayyut was really the first rabbi of Vilna.

He is also mentioned in Ephraim Cohen's responsa "Sha'ar Efrayim," and in Moses Jekuthiel Kaufmann's "Leḥem ha-Panim" on Yoreh De'ah, the first reference indicating Ḥayyut's proficiency in geometry.

He died at Vilna around May 1636.

His grandson was Rabbi Isaac Chajes.

== Works ==
His only known published work is "Zemirot le-Shabbat," or "Ḳabbalat Shabbat," which appeared in Prague (according to Leopold Zunz, in Lublin) in 1621, but of which only one copy is known to exist.

He was the author of an elegy on the conflagration of Posen and on the death of his brother Samuel, which appeared in his father's "Pene Yiẓḥaḳ" (Hebrew: פני יצחק) (Kraków, 1591).

The Bodleian Library contains a manuscript work of his, entitled "Derek Temimim" (Hebrew: דרך תמימים), which contains seven commentaries on the section Balaḳ of the Pentateuch and which is included in the Oppenheim collection ("Collectio Davidis," MS. No. 375, Hamburg, 1826).
