= Chayat =

The Hebrew / Yiddish surname Chayat (Polonized variants: Chajat, Chajit , Chajet, Chajetan ) may be derived from the occupation of tailor (Hebrew: חַיָט, Hebrew: חייט) or Hebrew: חַיָה, chayah, animal, life. Notable people with the surname include:

- Naftali Chayat, founder of Vayyar, Israeli semiconductor company
- Sherry Chayat, American Zen Buddhist
- Shoshi Chayat (1947–2011), Israeli painter, sculptor, poet and writer

== See also ==
- Hayat (disambiguation), different etymology
- Chajes, different etymology
