= Tazehnab-e Mohammad Baqer =

Tazehnab-e Mohammad Baqer تازه‌ناب محمدباقر
- Village
- Location within Iran
- Coordinates: 34°06′25″N 48°18′23″E
- Country: Iran
- Province: Hamadan
- County: Nahavand
- Bakhsh: Central
- Rural District: Shaban

Population (2006)
  - Total: 18
- Time zone: UTC+3:30 (IRST)
  - Summer (DST): UTC+4:30 (IRDT)

Tazehnab-e Mohammad Baqer (Persian: تازه‌ناب محمدباقر, also Romanized as Tāzehnāb-e Moḩammad Bāqer; also known as Pīr Ḩayāmī (پیرحیامی)) and Pīr Ḩayātī (پیرحیاتی)) is a village in Shaban Rural District, in the Central District of Nahavand County, Hamadan Province, Iran. At the 2006 census, its population was 18, in 4 families.
