= Hayat TV (Turkey) =

Turkish national television network

Hayatın Sesi TV
- Country: Turkey
- Headquarters: Istanbul, Turkey

Programming
- Language(s): Turkish

History
- Launched: 3 December 2007
- Closed: 29 September 2016

Links
- Website: hayattv.net

Hayatın Sesi TV was a Turkish nationwide TV channel established in 2007. It is one of the Turkish channels which gave extensive live coverage of the 2013 protests in Turkey; one of its reporters, Ismail Afacan, was injured by a water cannon.

On 13 June 2013 the state media regulator RTÜK ordered Türksat to stop broadcasting Hayatın Sesi TV's signal, claiming it lacked a license. This followed a recent change in the rules requiring broadcasters to have an RTÜK license. It later acknowledged that Hayat had an open application for a license, and cancelled the order to Turksat.

It was shut down under the emergency statutory decree issued in the aftermath of the 15 July failed coup d'état, alongside 11 other television and 11 radio stations, on 29 September 2016 when police raided the television station's headquarters in Istanbul.
