= Chait =

Chait, also transliterated as Khait, is a Jewish family name, from Hebrew חייט, “tailor”. Notable people with the surname include:

- Albert Chait, British Rabbi
- Arkady Khait, Soviet comedy and script writer
- Baruch Chait, Jewish religious composer and author
- Galit Chait, Israeli ice dancer
- Jonathan Chait, American columnist and political writer
- Jordan Chait (born 1997), South African rugby union player
- Lawrence G. Chait, American advertising executive who was a pioneer in mail-order sales
