= Motorcycle testing and measurement =

Motorcycle technology and verification

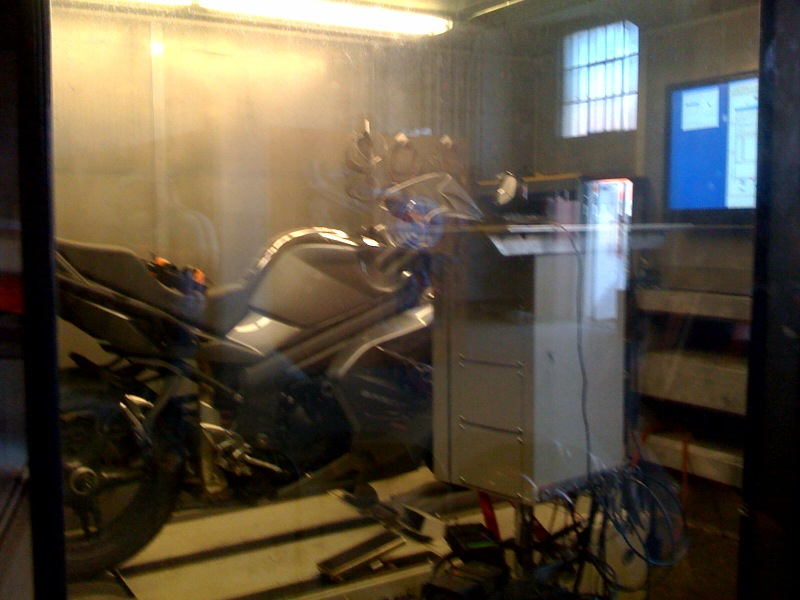
A Triumph Sprint ST on a chassis dynamometer

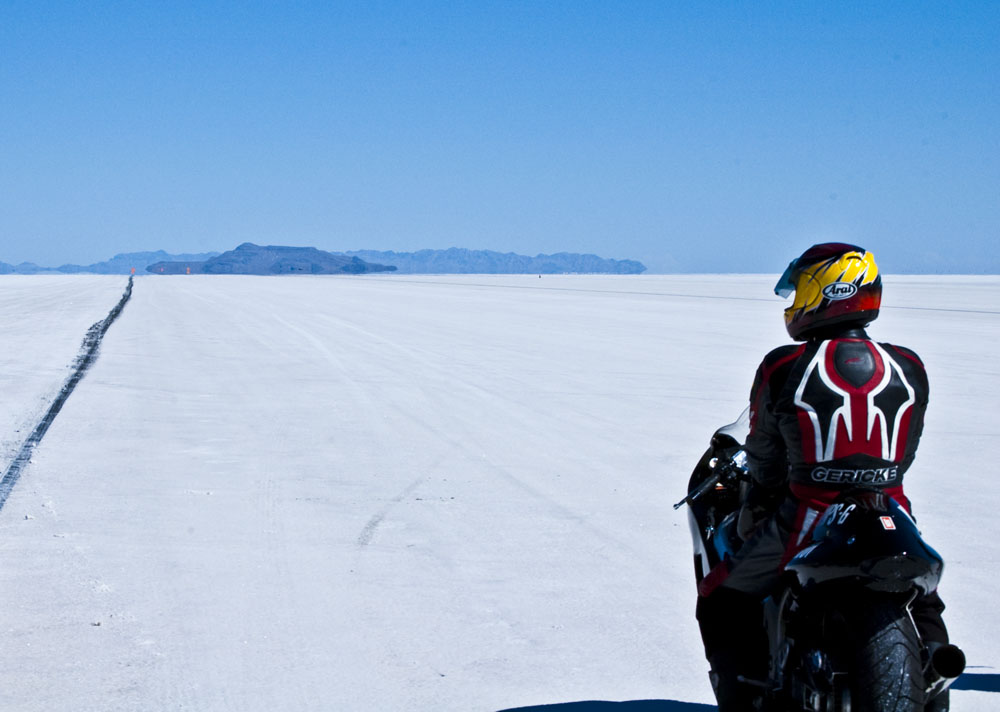
Suzuki Hayabusa at Bonneville Speed Week.

Motorcycle testing and measurement includes a range of more than two dozen statistics giving the specifications of the motorcycle, and the actual performance, expressed by such things as the output of the engine, and the top speed or acceleration of the motorcycle. Most parameters are uncontroversial and claims made by manufacturers are generally accepted without verification. These might include simple measurements like rake, trail, or wheelbase, or basic features, such as the type of brakes or ignition system.

Other measurements are often doubted or subject to misunderstandings, and the motorcycling press serves as an independent check on sometimes unrealistic sales and marketing claims. Many of these numbers are subject to variable methods of measurements, or disagreement as to the definition of the statistic. The parameters most often in contention for motorcycles are the weight, the engine output (power and torque), and the overall performance, especially acceleration, top speed, and fuel economy. With electric motorcycles and scooters, the range between charges is often a pivotal measurement.

== Top speed ==
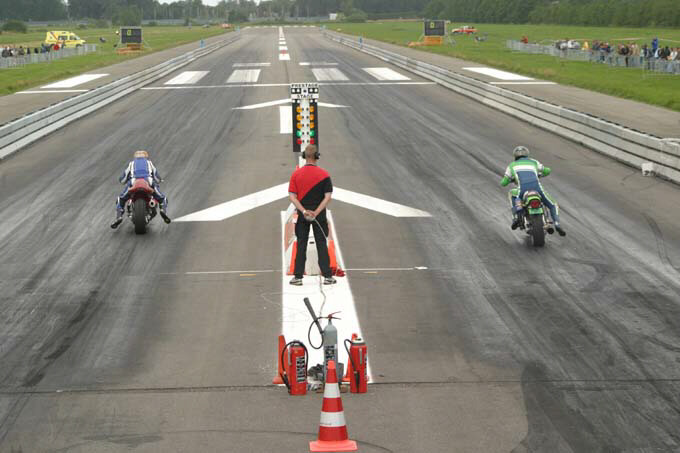
Two motorcycles at a ¼ mile (402 m) dragstrip.

Motorcycle speed tests, especially at high speeds, are prone to variation due to human error, limitations in equipment, and atmospheric factors like wind, humidity, and altitude. The published results of two otherwise identical tests could vary depending on whether the result is reported with or without industry standard correction factors calculated to compensate for test conditions. Rounding errors are possible as well when converting to/from miles and kilometers per hour.

== Engine power and torque ==
With power typically being the product of force and speed, a motorcycle's power and torque ratings will be highly indicative of its performance. Reported numbers for power and torque may however vary from one source to another due to inconsistencies in how testing equipment is calibrated, the method of using that equipment, the conditions during the test, and particularly the location that force and speed are being measured at. The power of the engine alone, often called crankshaft power, or power at the crankshaft, will be significantly greater than the power measured at the rear wheel. The amount of power lost due to friction in the transmission (primary drive, gearbox and final drive) depends on the details of the design and construction. Generalizing, a chain drive motorcycle may have some 5-20% less power at the rear wheel than at the crankshaft, while a shaft drive model may lose a little more than that due to greater friction.

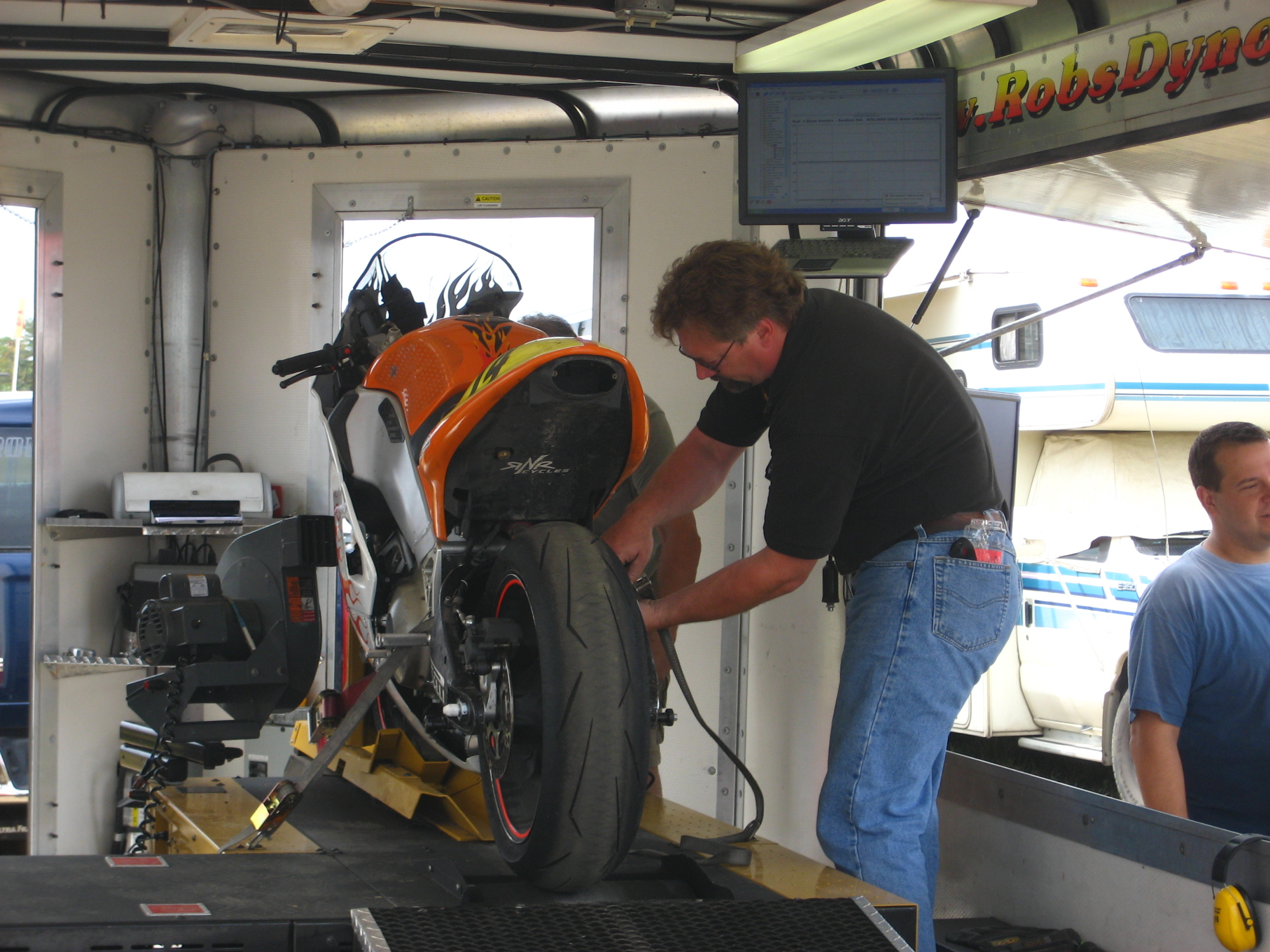
Preparing for a dyno test – note the fan used for engine cooling

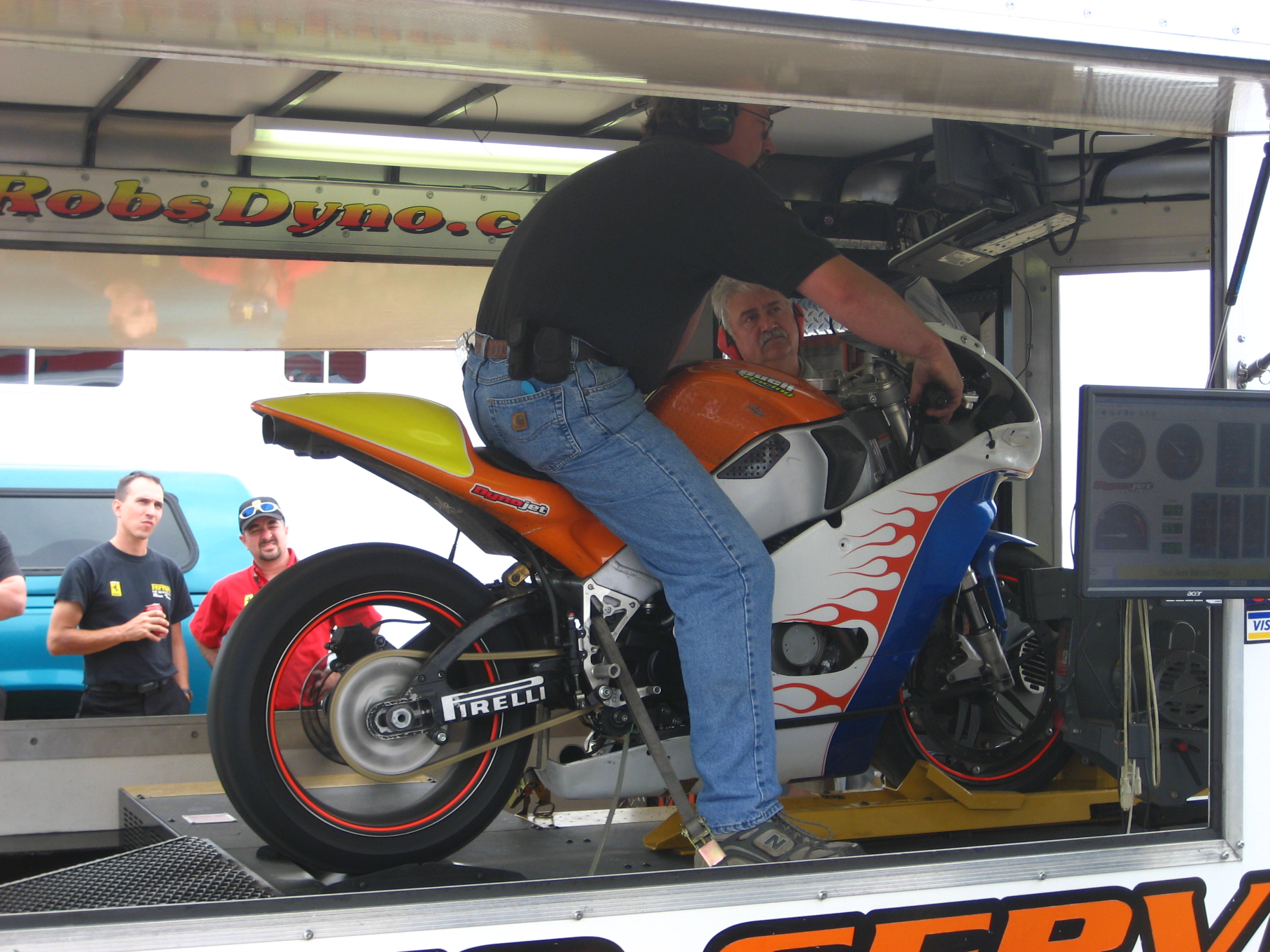
Motorcycle rear wheel on a dyno roller.

Graph of power and torque.

While the crankshaft power excludes these transmission losses, still the measurement is often made elsewhere in the drive-train, often at the rear wheel. A correction for the transmission losses is then applied to the measured values to obtain the crankshaft values. For motorcycles, the reported power and torque numbers normally pertain to the crankshaft. In directive 92/61/EEC of 30 June 1992 relating to the type-approval of two or three-wheel motor vehicles, it is referred to as "maximum engine power", and manufacturers use similar terms. Historically, this convention may have come from the pre-unit construction, wherein the crankshaft was directly accessible for measurements, and the gearbox might have come from a different manufacturer. However, when the engineering details of the transmission are known, the losses therein can be accurately quantified & corrected for. Explicit guidance on the homologation measurements and transmission corrections is given in directive 95/1/EC.

A main source of ambiguity and differences comes from the conditions the test was done at. These conditions include details like atmospheric conditions (temperature, pressure, humidity), tire pressure, how the motorcycle is secured against the dyno drum, but most importantly: the conditions of the motorcycle itself. Examples thereof are: was the alternator fitted?; was the air filter fitted?; what exhaust system was fitted? One would hope that manufacturers would test their motorcycles in normal running order, so the condition that they are sold in, and for which they obtained type-approval, but this is not always the case. Ducati, for instance, has chosen to publish more positive values, stating that "Technical data referring to power and torque was measured on an engine test stand at Ducati". Their published values are typically 5% higher than the homologation values, in normal running order.

== Weight ==
Motorcycle weight is expressed in three ways: gross vehicle weight rating (GVWR), dry weight and wet weight. GVWR is the maximum total weight of the motorcycle including all consumables, the rider, any passenger, and any cargo. It is generally well-understood and standardized, being defined by law and overseen by agencies such as the US Department of Transportation. In contrast, wet and dry weight are unstandardized measurements that refer to the weight of the motorcycle without rider, passengers or cargo, and either with (wet) or without (dry) a varying set of fluids such as fuel or lubricants, and the battery.

Wet and dry weight are often used to make comparisons between different motorcycles, because all else being equal, a lighter motorcycle will generally perform and handle better than a heavier one.

The difference between GVWR and wet weight is how much the motorcycle can safely carry, including the rider, fuel, and other load.

=== Dry weight ===
As its weight changes during riding, the dry weight of a motorcycle typically excludes the gasoline (or other fuel). Dry weight, in this sense, can directly be used for comparison with (FIM) weight limits, which pertain to the motorcycle in operating condition. It is also part of the homologation tests, and it is found on the EC Certificate of Conformity as unladen mass. This dry weight could also be useful in comparing different models, with different fuel tank capacities. However, manufacturers may also exclude some or all of the following: engine oil, coolant, or brake fluid, and this makes such a comparison difficult. When any of these is excluded, the specified dry weight no longer pertains to the motorcycle in running order. Some manufacturers even exclude the battery, notwithstanding the weight of the battery is mainly in solid components (usually lead), not liquid (electrolytes).

So there is no standardized way to test the dry weight of a motorcycle. Inconsistencies may be found between a motorcycle manufacturer's published dry weight and motorcycle press and media outlets' published dry weight. This is due to different testing techniques, mainly differences in what is being excluded, and a lack of defining how the test was done. A battery is typically included in the dry weight by manufacturers (with the exception of at least one), but it may not be included by media outlets. On the other hand, some press and media outlets only exclude fuel to define their dry weight. For a typical sport bike, the difference between wet weight and manufacturer claimed dry weight is around 70 lb (32 kg). This difference includes around 30 lb (14 kg) of gasoline, 7 lb (3.2 kg) of engine oil, 7 lb (3.2 kg) of coolant, and 9 lb (4.1 kg) of battery. These weights are even larger for bigger motorcycles with higher capacities, complicating comparison between air-cooled and water-cooled motorcycles' dry weights.

While its weight is small compared to the other fluids discussed above (a few ounces), hydraulic fluid might be excluded during shipping. It is not safe to assume that it is either included or excluded in the reported dry weight. Hydraulic fluid might be found on a particular bike's front brake and reservoir, plus maybe a rear brake with a reservoir, and maybe also in a hydraulic clutch with its own reservoir.

Ducati has in the past used the term "Ducati weight", pertaining to a value excluding the battery as well as all fluids, but have since begun using "dry weight" for this.

Beginning in 2009, the Japanese Big Four manufacturers and BMW began publishing the wet weight rather than dry, usually providing some explanation for what this means. Since then most other manufacturers have followed, in order to comply with EC directives that explicitly state that the values pertain to the vehicle in running order. Honda describes it as curb weight (aka kerb weight) and says this means the bike is "ready to ride." Others say all fluids are included and the fuel tank is at least 90% full. Erik Buell Racing gives "wet weight (no fuel)" for the 2012 1190RS motorcycle, while KTM gives a "weight without fuel approx."

=== Wet weight ===
The wet weight of a motorcycle includes, but is not limited to fuel, engine oil, coolant, brake fluid, and battery.

There is no global standardized way to test the wet weight of a motorcycle. In the EU, Council Directive 93/93/EEC specifies wet weight as "mass in running order", which includes all equipment normally fitted to a bike such as windscreen, tool kit and at least 90% of its fuel capacity. Motorcycle manufacturers will rarely publish wet weight measurements and inconsistencies will almost always be found between different motorcycle press and media outlets. This is due to different testing techniques, differences in what is being included, and by the organization doing the testing omitting an explanation of how they weighed the motorcycle.

Cycle World has published wet weights with all consumables on board, but only half a tank of fuel, while Yamaha has recently published specification tables that use the typically automotive-oriented term curb weight, and stated that it included full fluid levels and the bike was "ready to ride."

=== Gross vehicle weight rating ===
Gross vehicle weight rating (GVWR) is the manufacturer's stated maximum safe mass of the motorcycle, including its own mass and everything it carries, taking into consideration the tire profile and load capacity; brake, suspension and frame capacity. It is printed on a motorcycle's VIN Plate. The difference between GVWR and wet weight is how much the motorcycle can safely carry, including fuel; the rider, passenger and their clothing; cargo; and other accessories. Using this calculation, a typical large cruiser might have a maximum useful payload of 400 pounds (180 kg). This is especially of interest in touring motorcycles because when comparing motorcycles ridden by the same operator and passenger, clad in the same safety clothing, the machine with the greatest difference between its GVWR and wet weight can safely bear the most additional weight; for instance, camping food and gear, extra fuel, or spare parts. It also indicates that a large rider and passenger might overload the machine even without carrying any additional load, in which case they might need two vehicles for a planned tour.

== Aerodynamics ==
Automotive aerodynamics of motorcycles are not as frequently measured by third parties or reported by manufacturers as other figures like power. The dimensionless measure of drag coefficient, C_{d}, varies from .55 to .65 (comparable to a pickup truck), vs C_{d} .29 for many sports cars and even .20 for high efficiency cars. However a more relevant figure of merit, C_{d}A, factors in the vehicle's frontal area, and thus actual power required to overcome wind resistance. A typical projected frontal area for motorcycles is in the neighborhood of 2.9–3.9 sq ft (0.27–0.36 m^{2}). When the C_{d}A figure is reported, it is sometimes in nonstandard units making it hard to compare between motorcycles and automobiles.

C_{d} could be reduced through the use of "dustbin fairings" or fully enclosed and streamlined fairings (like the Vetter Streamliner prototype) to reduce wake turbulence and flow separation, but these were banned in racing in the 50s and so are out of fashion among street motorcycles. The adherence to "styling aerodynamics" (as opposed to measurably improved aerodynamics) and ergonomic considerations have affected production motorcycle design.

Another factor making aerodynamic measurements relatively uncommon in the popular press is the lack of access to research-quality wind tunnels by journalists.

Complete analysis of motorcycle aerodynamics would include measurement of drag, lift and side force at various speeds, wind angles, and rider postures; as well as pitching moment, rolling moment, and yawing moment (see yaw, pitch and roll for descriptions).

== Other parameters ==
The following have been commonly used at one time or another to describe motorcycles. Not all of them apply to every motorcycle, and most sources publish only a subset of this list, while others have unique measurements not seen elsewhere.

- Class see types of motorcycle
- Engine see motorcycle engine
  - Power see above
  - Torque see above
  - Bore x stroke
  - Compression ratio
  - Fuel system
  - Lubrication
  - Ignition
- Performance
  - Top speed see above
  - Acceleration: Such as 0 to 60 mph (0 to 97 km/h), 0 to 100 mph (0 to 161 km/h), and roll on acceleration such as 60 to 80 mph (97 to 129 km/h), 80 to 100 mph (130 to 160 km/h)
  - 0 to 1/4 mi (0.00 to 0.40 km) See dragstrip
  - Braking 60 to 0 mph (97 to 0 km/h), 100 to 0 mph (161 to 0 km/h)
  - Fuel consumption See Fuel economy & WMTC
  - Range
  - Emissions see Vehicle emissions control and WMTC (global), NEDC (EU), FTP-75 (USA)
- Transmission number of forward gear ratios, and the type of transmission (e.g. "6-speed manual, 5-speed automatic")
- Final drive
- Suspension See Motorcycle suspension
- Brakes
- Tires See Motorcycle tyre
- Dimensions
  - Rake and trail
  - Wheelbase
  - Length
  - Width
  - Height
  - Ground clearance
  - Seat height
- Weight
  - Dry weight see above
  - Wet weight see above
  - Gross vehicle weight rating (GVWR)
  - Load capacity GVWR - Wet weight
- Fuel capacity
- Oil capacity Typically applies to 2-stroke bikes with a separate oil tank.
- Turning radius
- Climbing ability

== See also ==
- Conversion of units
- Curb weight - the car and truck equivalent of motorcycle wet weight
- Dry weight (automobile)
- Speedometer error
- Vehicle metrics
