= Citroën Ami (electric vehicle) =

Electric quadricycle

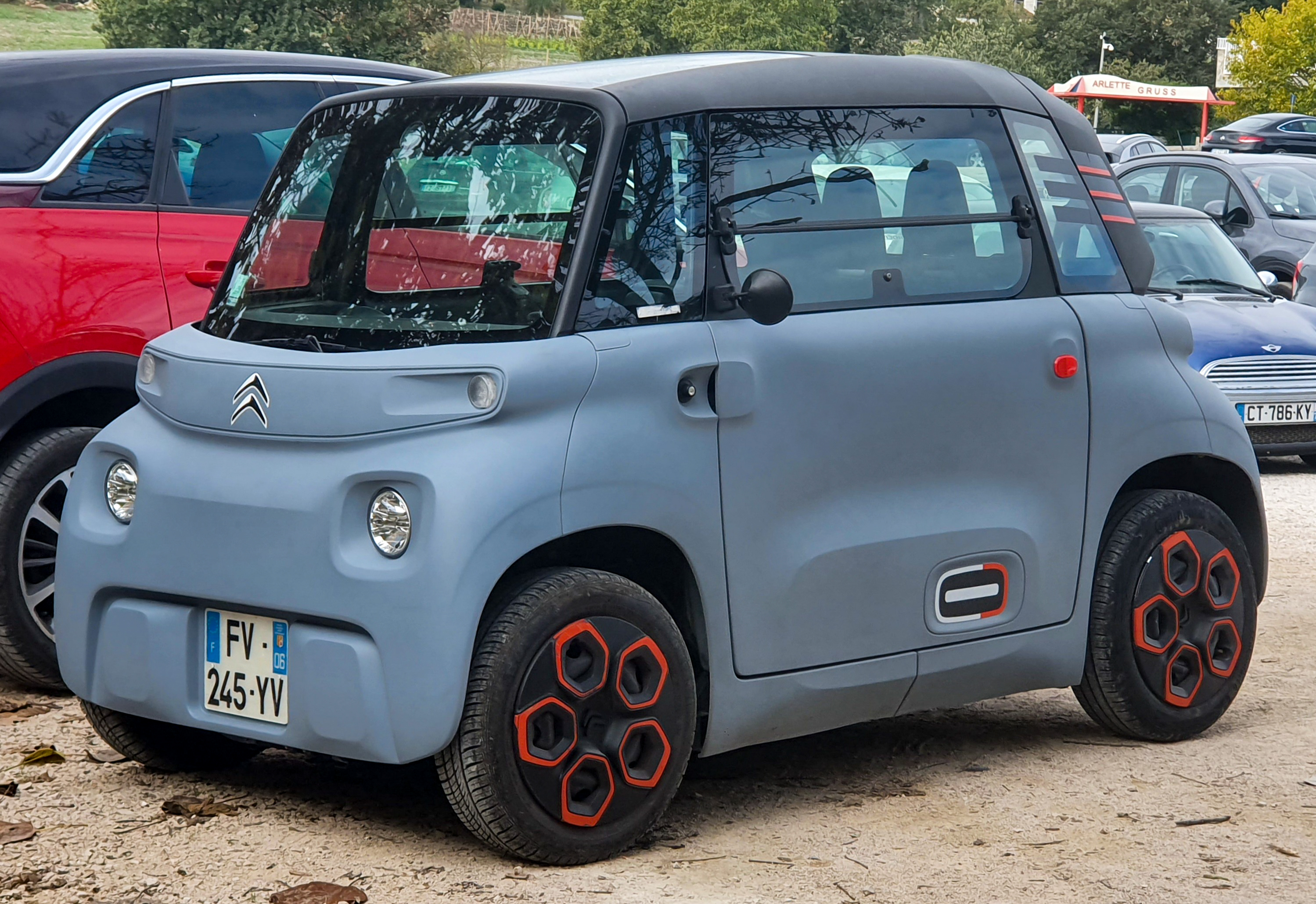

Overview
- Manufacturer: PSA Group (2020–2021); Stellantis (2021–present)
- Also called: Opel Rocks-e (2021–2023); Opel Rocks Electric (2023–present); Fiat Topolino (2023–present)
- Production: 2020–present
- Assembly: Morocco: Kenitra (Stellantis Kenitra plant)
- Designer: Pierre Leclercq (Ami); Centro Stile Fiat (Topolino)

Body and chassis
- Class: Quadricycle
- Body style: 2-door quadricycle
- Layout: Front-motor, front-wheel-drive

Powertrain
- Electric motor: 6 kW (8.2 PS; 8.0 hp) single motor
- Battery: 5.5 kWh lithium-ion
- Electric range: 75 km (47 mi) (WMTC)

Dimensions
- Length: 2,410 mm (95 in)
- Width: 1,390 mm (55 in)
- Height: 1,520 mm (60 in)
- Kerb weight: 425 kg (937 lb) (without battery); 485 kg (1,069 lb) (with 5.5 kWh battery)

Chronology
- Predecessor: Citroën C-Zero

The Citroën Ami is a two-door, battery-electric quadricycle marketed by the French brand Citroën since 2020. Designed by Pierre Leclercq and named after the model produced between 1961 and 1978, the production model was previewed by the "Ami One" concept car. Both the Ami and Ami One were developed simultaneously by Groupe PSA (now Stellantis) and Altran. The vehicle is manufactured at the Stellantis Kenitra plant in Kenitra, Morocco, equipped with a compact electric motor located at the front, providing 6 kilowatts (8.0 hp; 8.2 PS) driving the front wheels. The vehicle's diminutive size has been noted by car reviewers, with a journalist from The Telegraph describing being inside the Ami as "being inside a Lego brick".

== History ==
The French carmaker Citroën debuted the Ami One, a concept car, at the Geneva Motor Show in March 2019. The doors are almost identical, with the driver's door being front-hinged and the passenger's door rear-hinged. This design choice was made to reduce costs by minimising the number of unique parts. The vehicle's front and rear bumpers are also made from the same components. A smartphone powers the information screen and provides audio to the car through the cylindrical Bluetooth speaker located to the right of the steering column. According to Jean-Arthur Madeleine, the Ami's interior designer, "the way to make it affordable was to avoid the redundancy of technology [...] everything is based on the idea that instead of having a lot of displays, everything is coming from your smartphone".

The production version of the Ami was unveiled in February 2020. Pierre Leclercq, the exterior designer of the Ami, revealed that the production vehicle and the concept car were developed simultaneously. He also noted that the Ami's design was not intended to be carried over into Citroën's wider model line. Manufacture of the Ami, which began in June 2020, occurs at the facility in Kenitra, Morocco.

== Overview ==
It is a light motor quadricycle which can be driven in France without a license by people born before 1988 or by those older than 14 who have an AM license (EEA name)–formerly Road Safety Certificate (BSR) (national name). As a quadricycle it is limited to 45 km/h (28 mph).

The Ami can be used for carsharing in the Free2Move network of Groupe PSA, rented or purchased, on the internet or in stores Fnac and Darty with which Citroën has concluded a partnership for the exhibition, sale or rental of the vehicle from 30 March 2020. The vehicle can be picked up at a store, a Citroën dealership or delivered at home.

In June 2022, Citroën launched the My Ami Buggy, a limited edition (50) inspired by the My Ami Buggy concept.

In May 2023, 1000 second generation Ami Buggy were produced for sale in Europe, Turkey and Morocco.

In November 2023, the Ami Pop trim was released, which includes four alloy-look wheel trims, a black graphic strip under the windshield, black front and rear bumper sections, a rear spoiler and a set of door and quarter panels graphics.

In May 2024, the Ami was refreshed with a new color (Night Sepia), as well as other small changes, such as the drive select buttons being moved to the dashboard below the hazards indicator and phone mount.

At the 2024 Autosalon Paris in October, Stellantis presented a facelift for the Citroën Ami with a changed front- and back panel. The headlights were now mounted higher, in the positions previously taken by the indicators. The indicator lights took lower positions, about as high above the ground as the top of the wheels. A modified Citroën logo is used on the facelift version. The central section of the vehicle, as well as all its main technical data, did not change. Citroën gave sales for the Ami at this point with some 65,000 units sold.

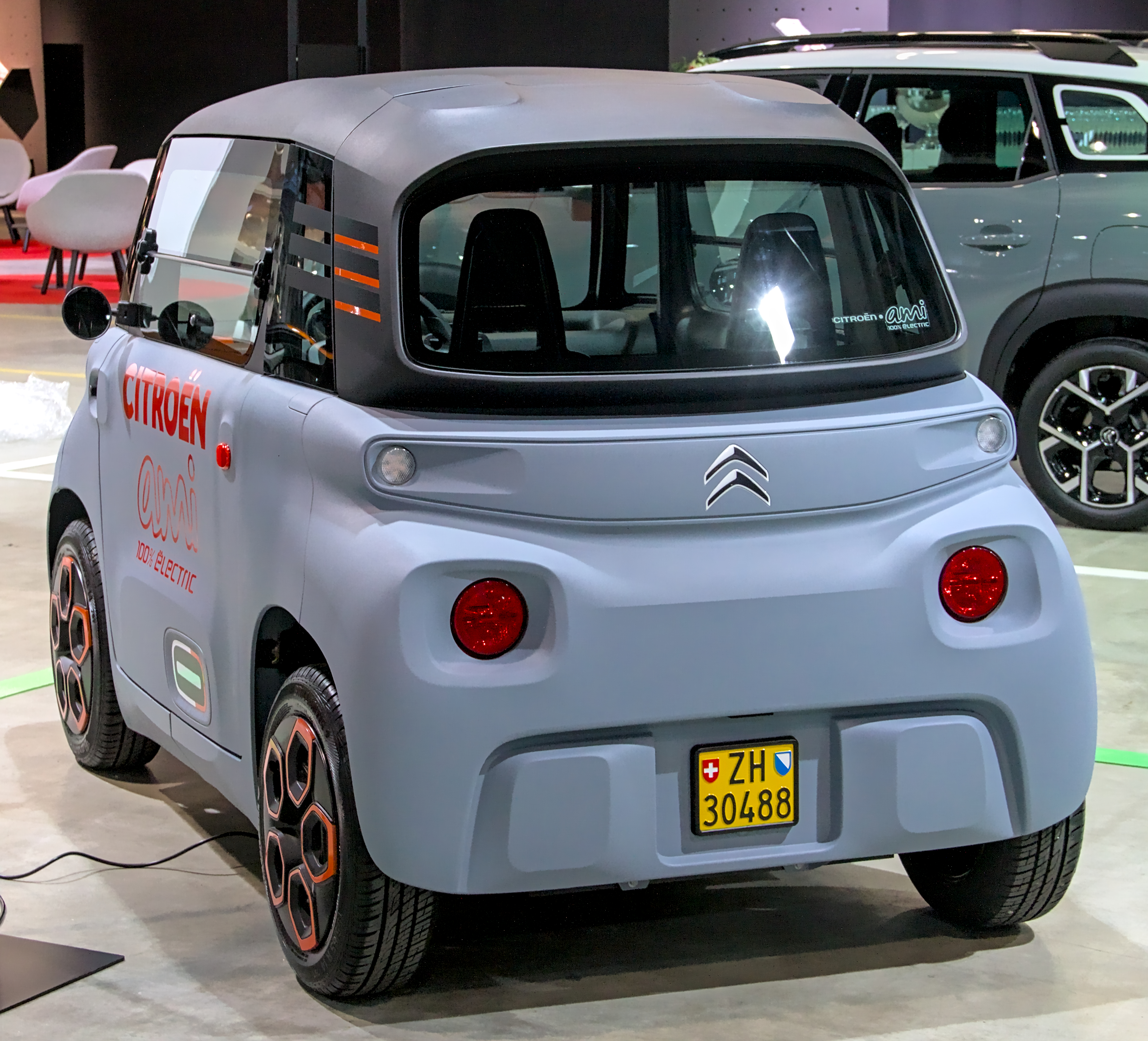
Rear view

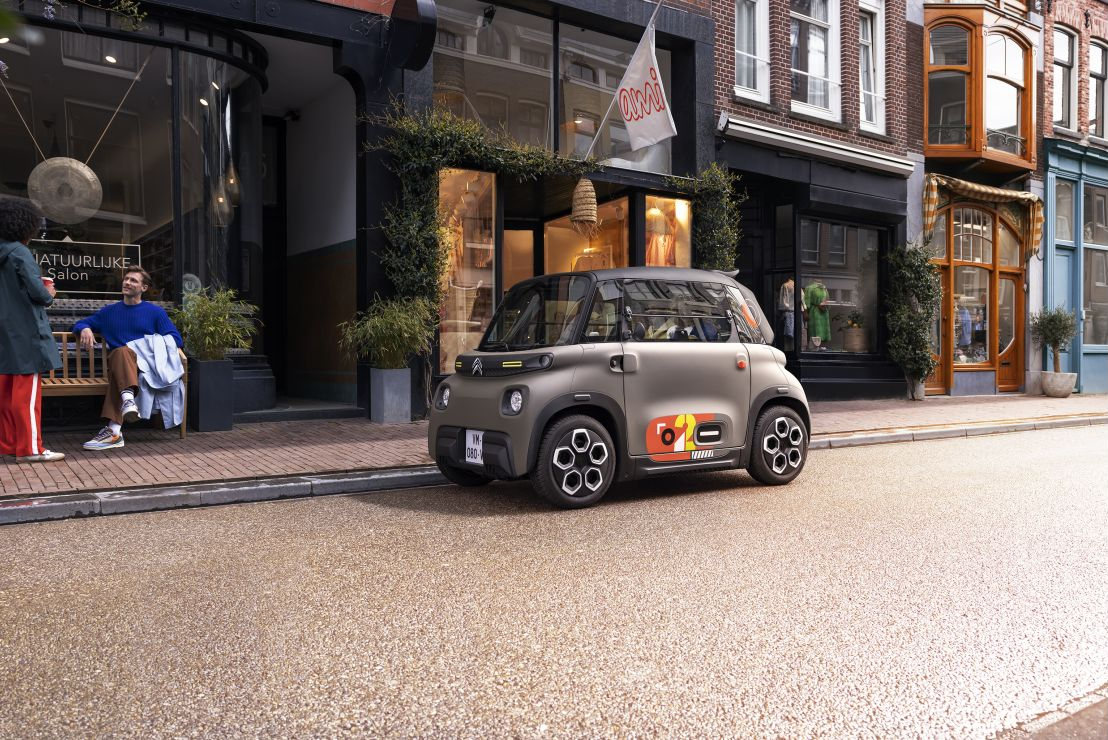
Side view Night Sepia

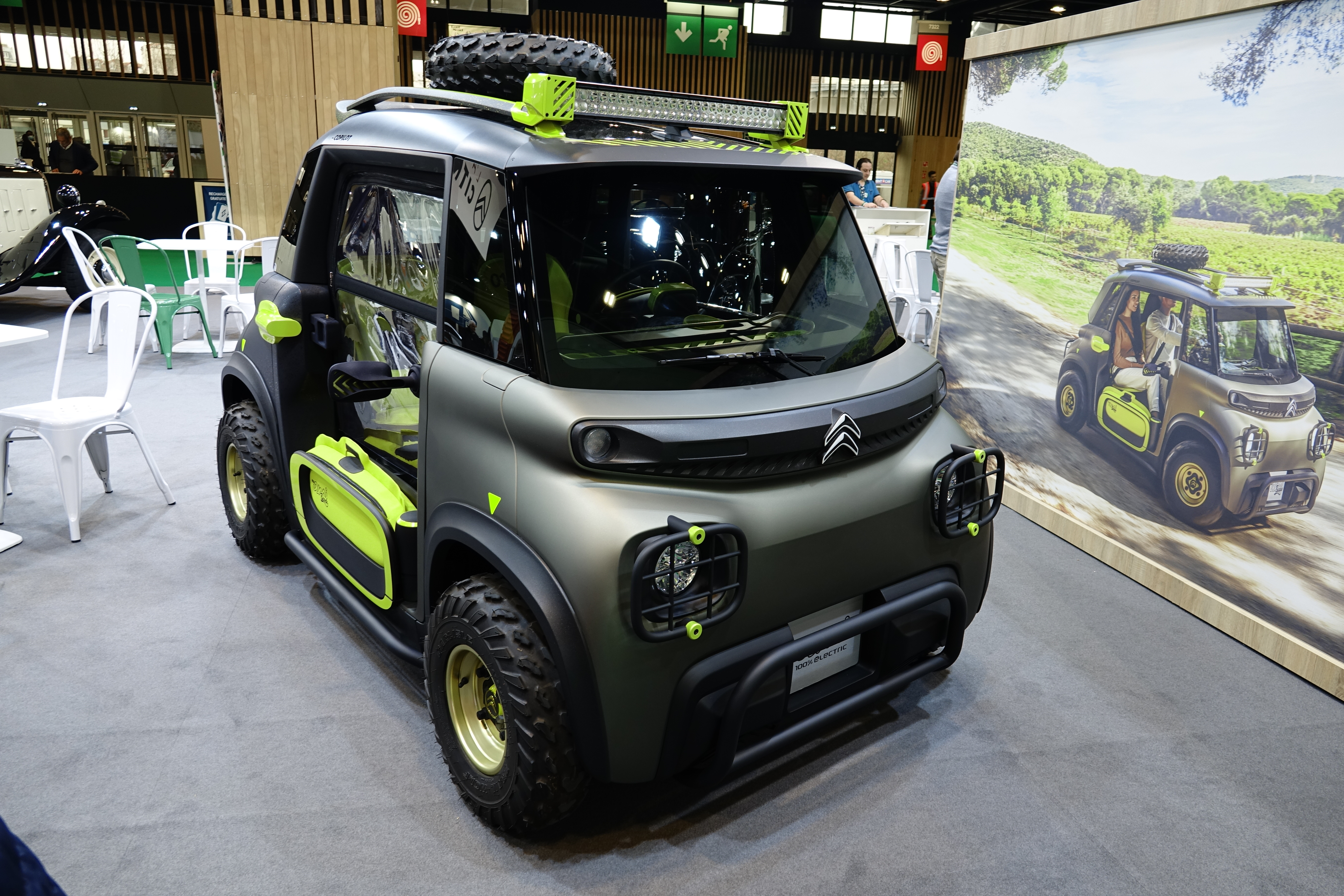
Citroën My Ami Buggy concept

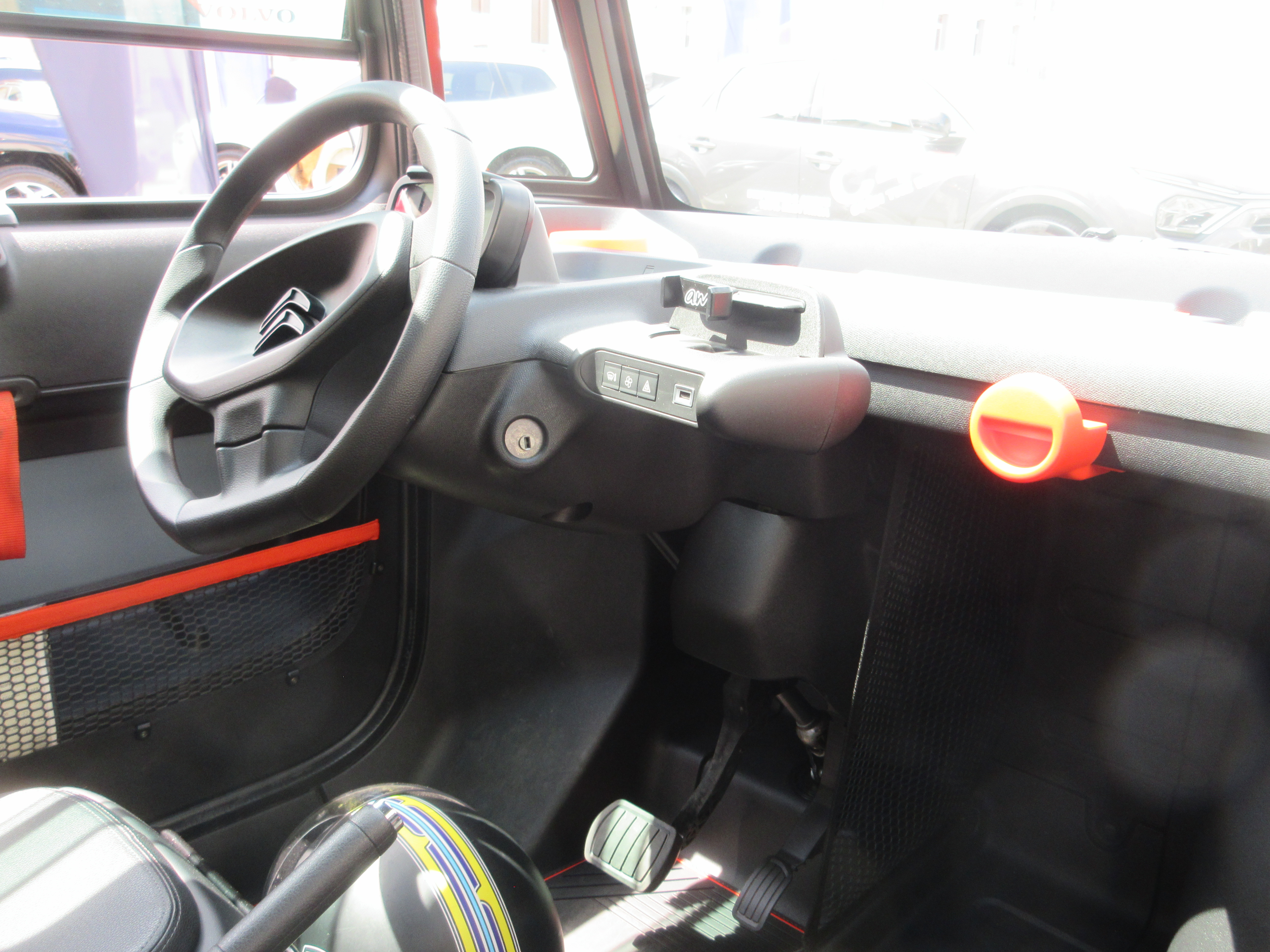
Interior

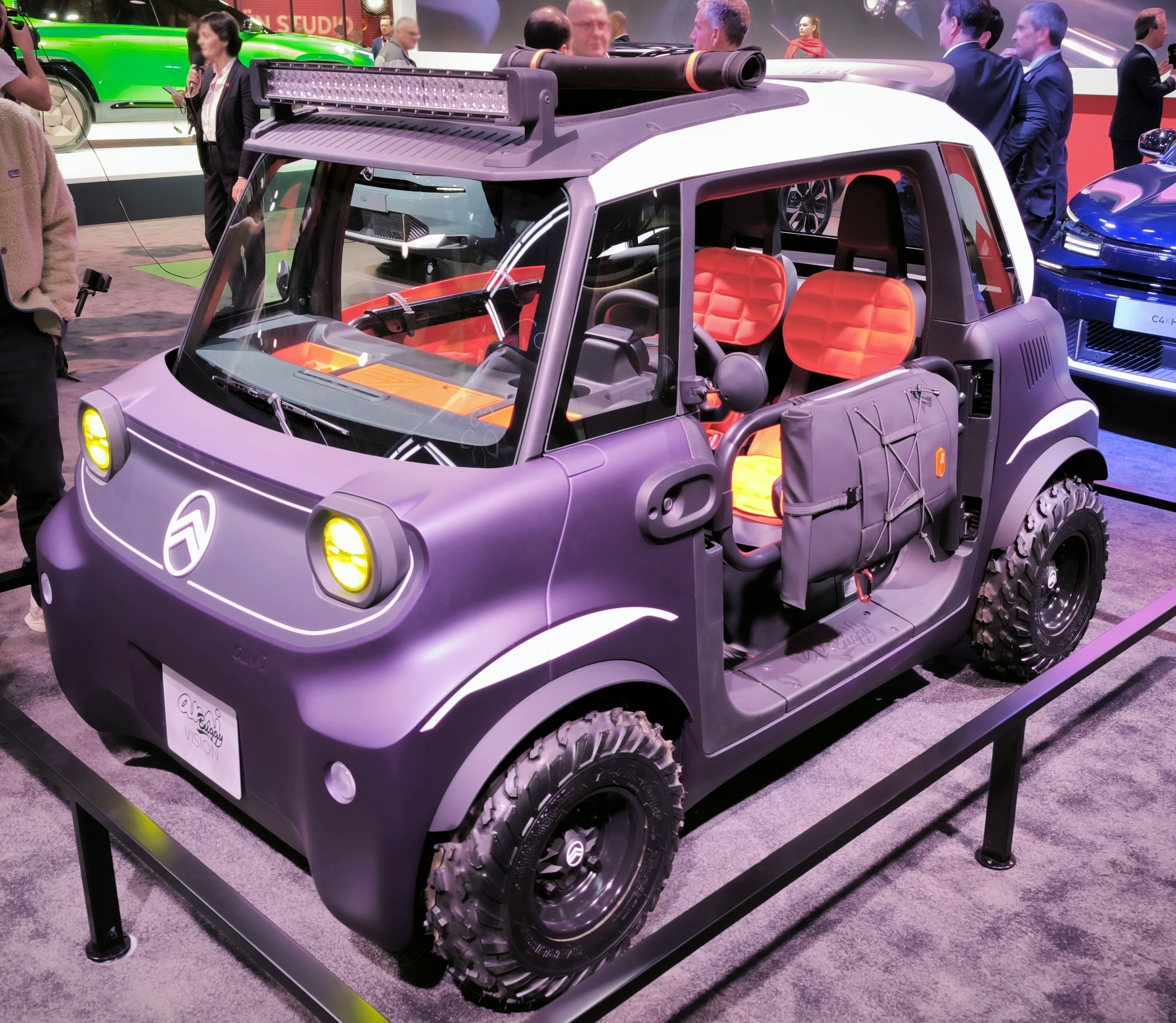
Buggy with 2025 facelift panels

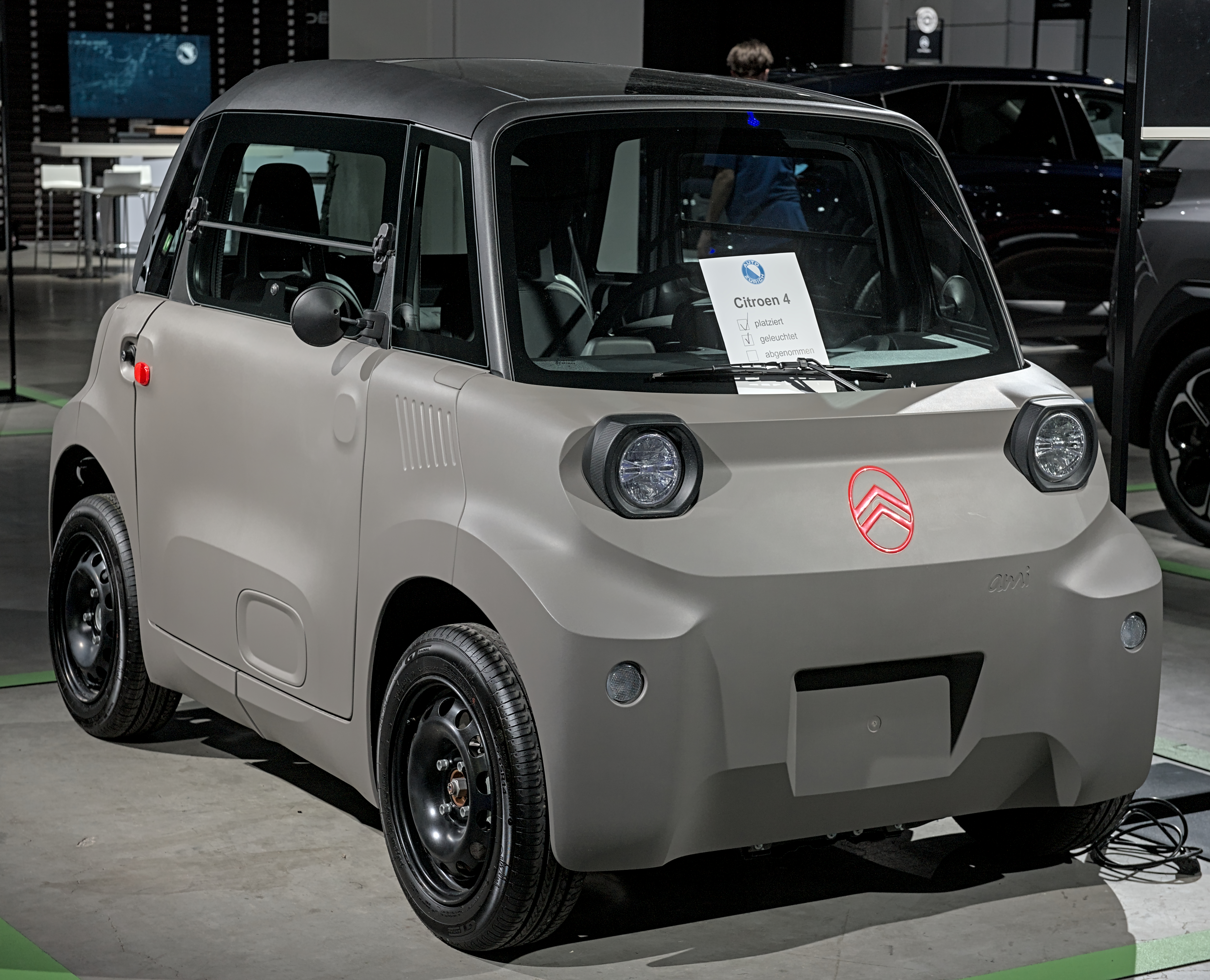
Regular 2025 facelift Ami (front)

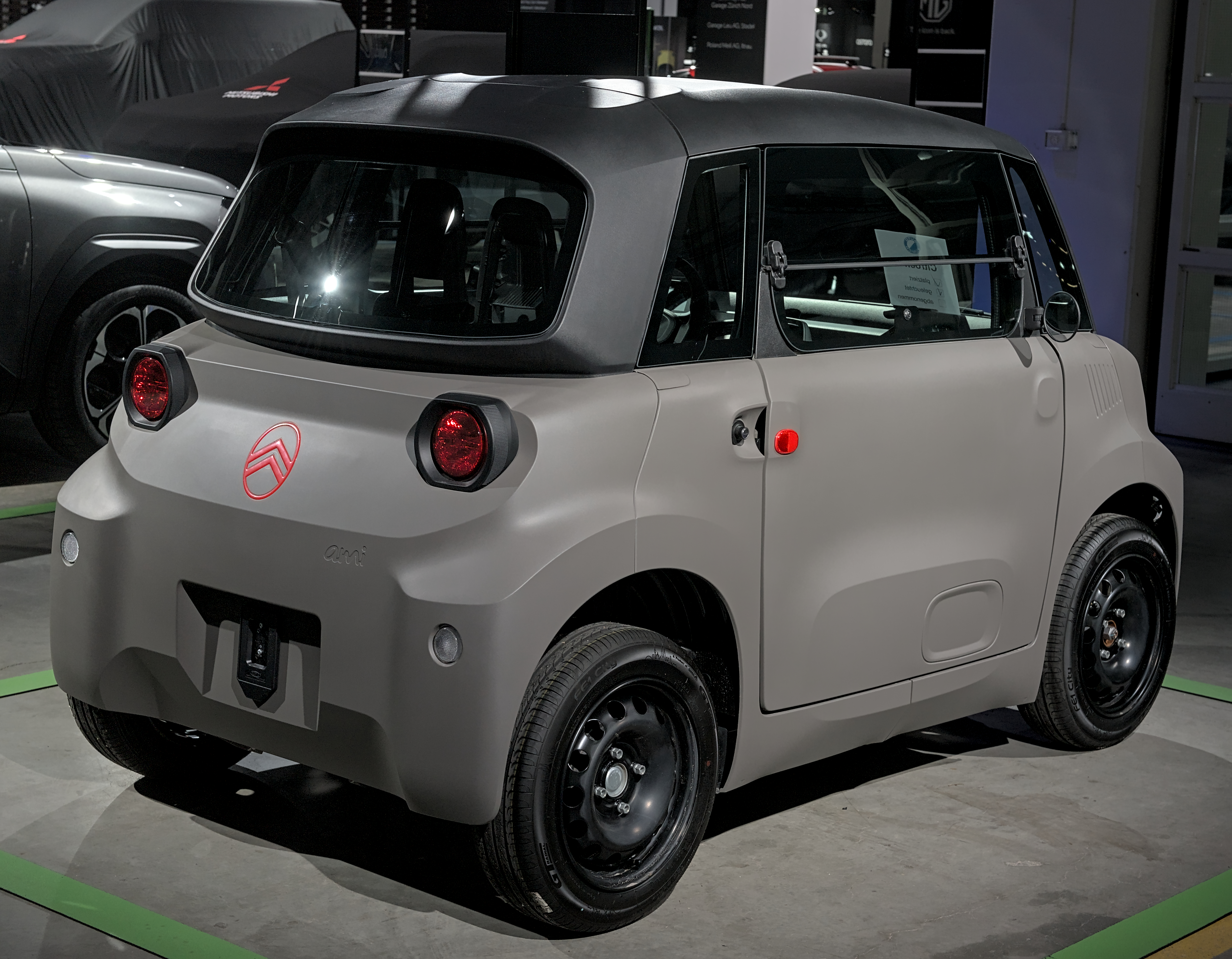
Rear (restyling 2025)

=== Opel Rocks Electric ===
In August 2021, Opel presented the Opel Rocks-e, an identical version of the vehicle for Germany only. It went on sale in November 2021. From 2023, it was renamed Opel Rocks Electric, in line with Opel's phasing out of the "-e" suffix on electric models.

From 2022, the Opel Rocks Electric is offered on the Dutch market as well, where it is marketed with the Citroën model.

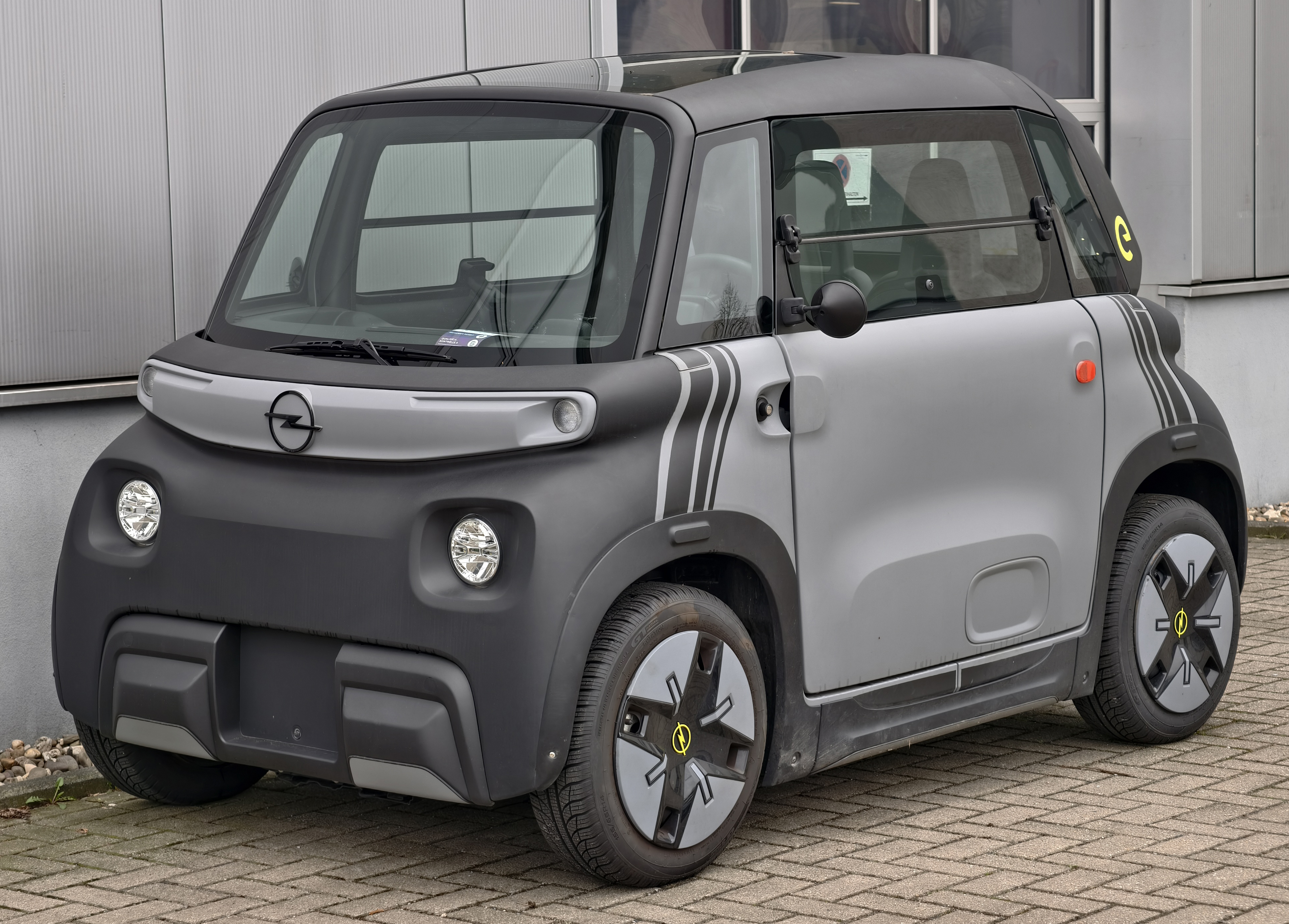
Opel Rocks-e (front)

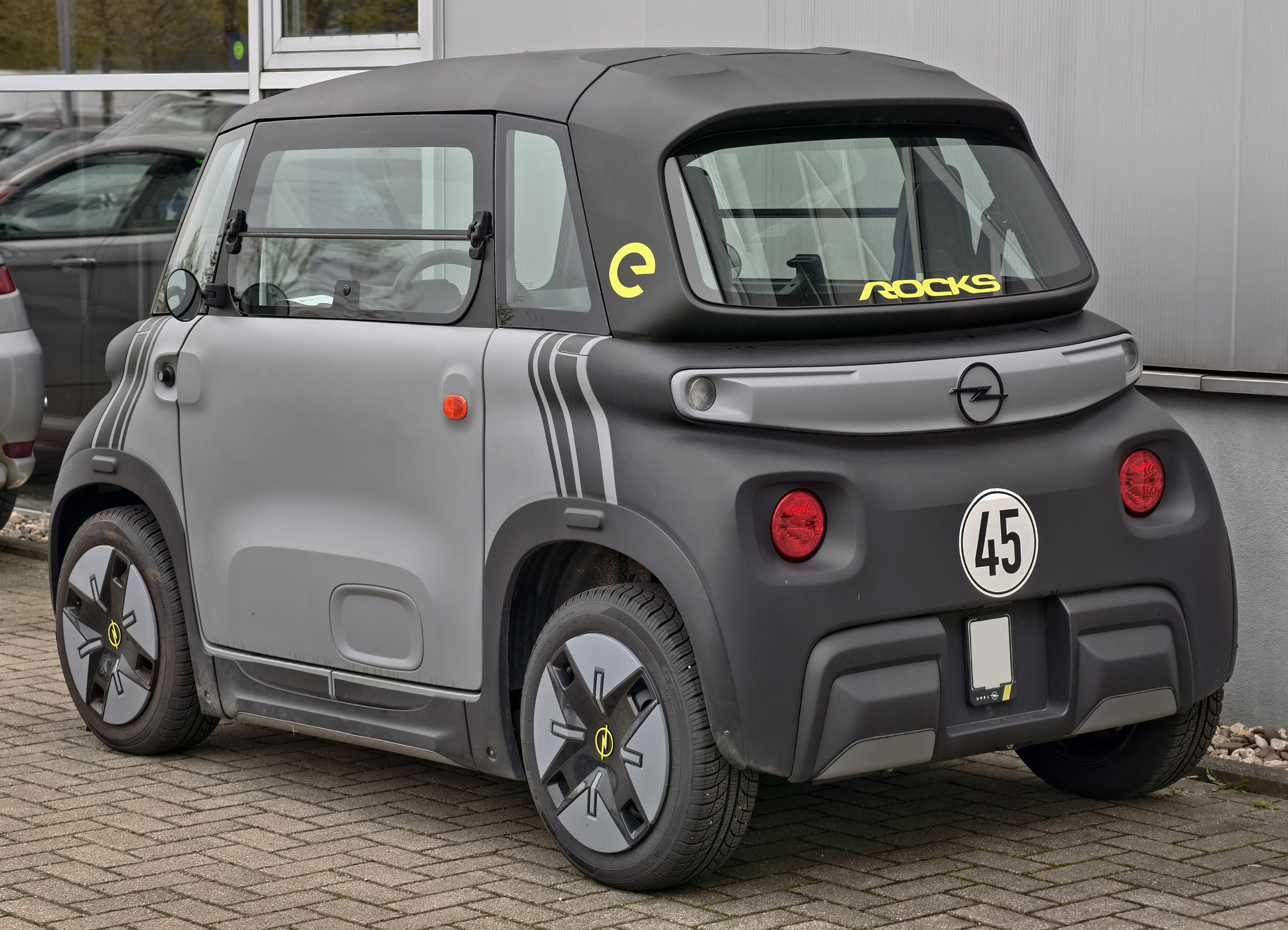
Opel Rocks-e (rear)

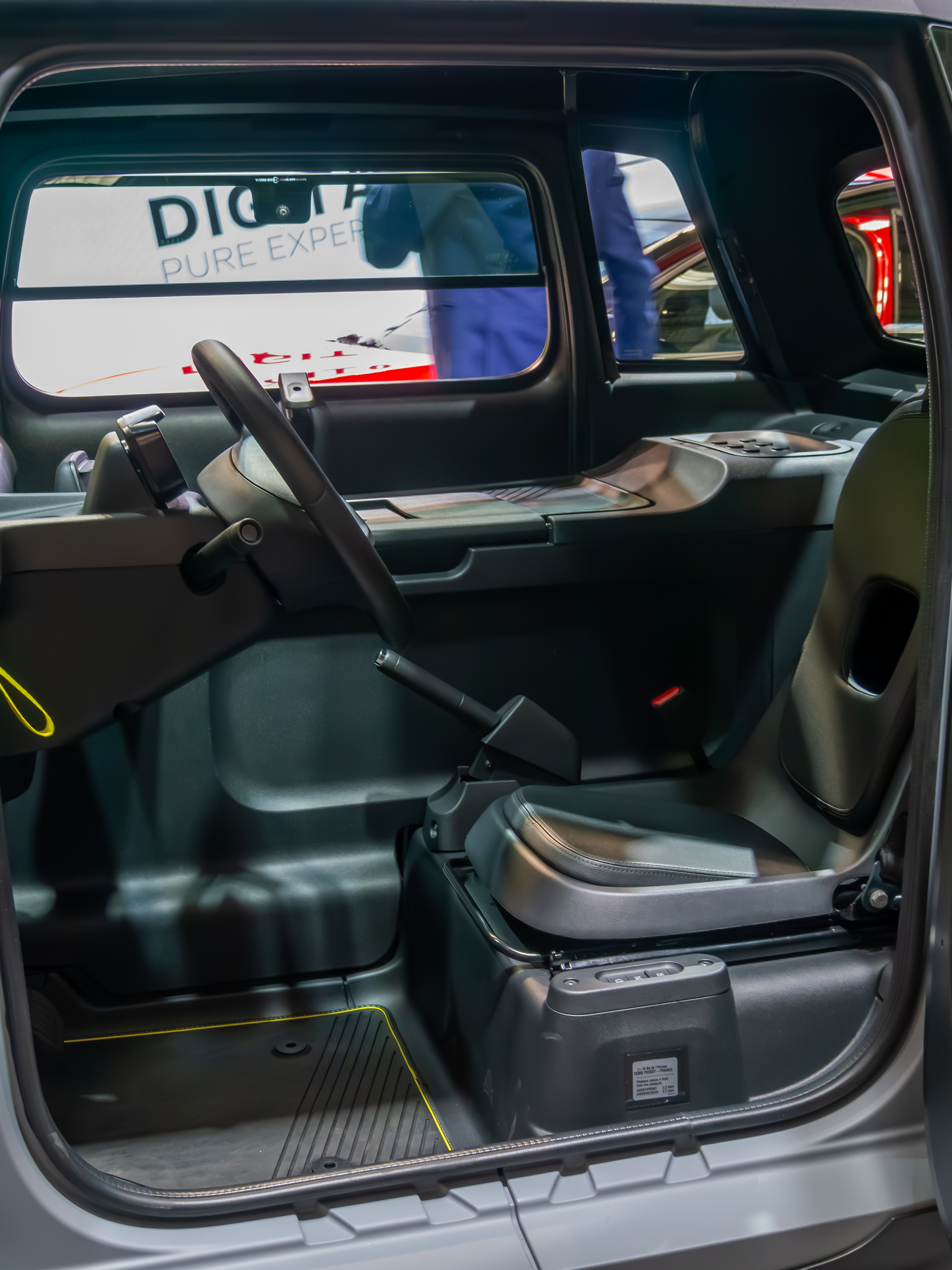
Opel Rocks-e (interior)

=== Fiat Topolino ===
The Fiat Topolino is a rebadged version of the Citroën Ami and Opel Rocks. It is the only vehicle of the three that has a different front, back and side design. On the front it resembles the design of the 1957 to 1975 Fiat 500, and on the back it features vertical taillights. The Dolcevita version features a canvas roof and ropes in place of doors. In 2025 Fiat released the Topolino Vilebrequin Collector's Edition featuring a built-in shower among other things. Fiat began selling the Topolino in the United States in July 2026.

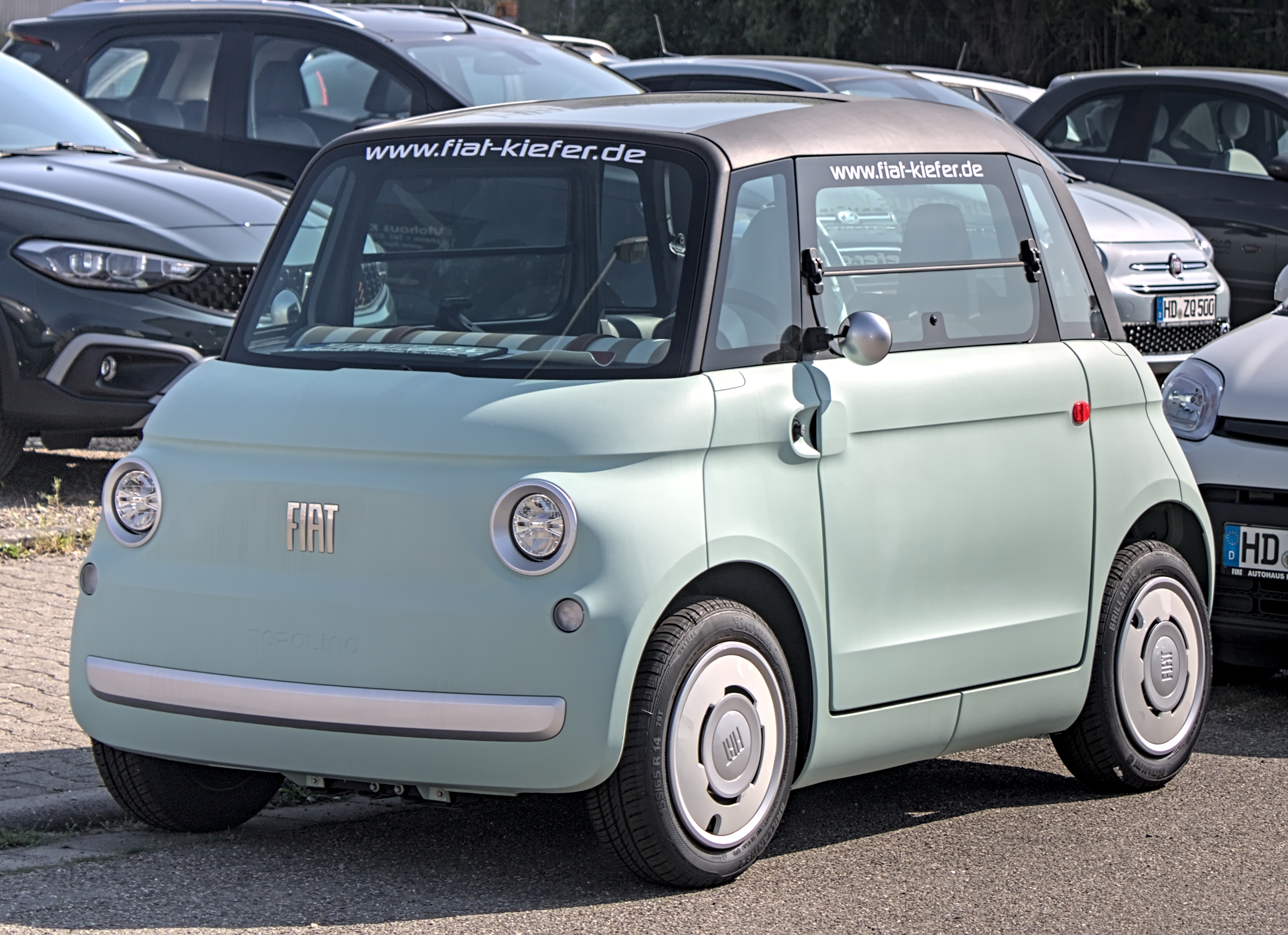
Fiat Topolino (front)

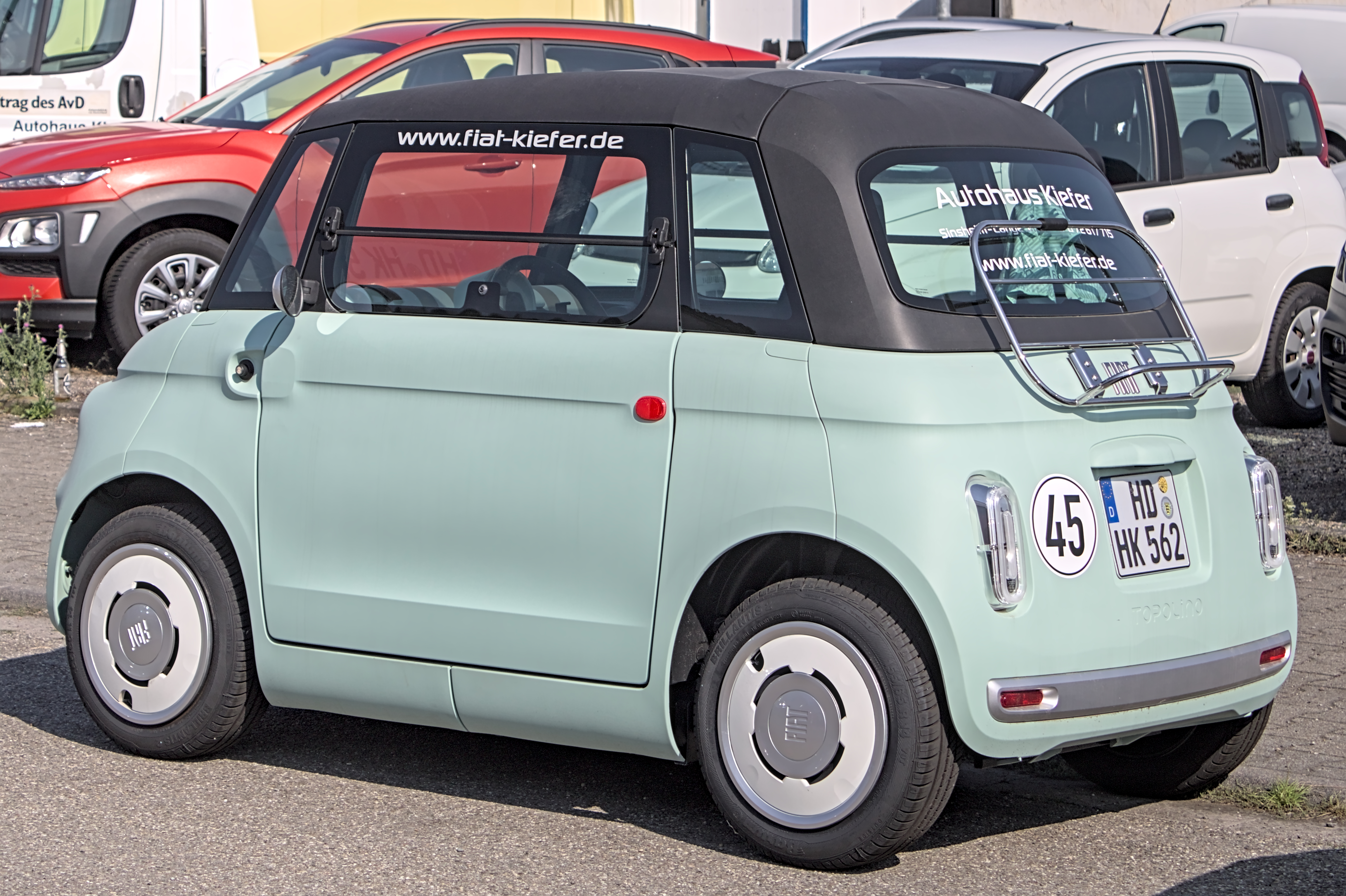
Fiat Topolino (rear)

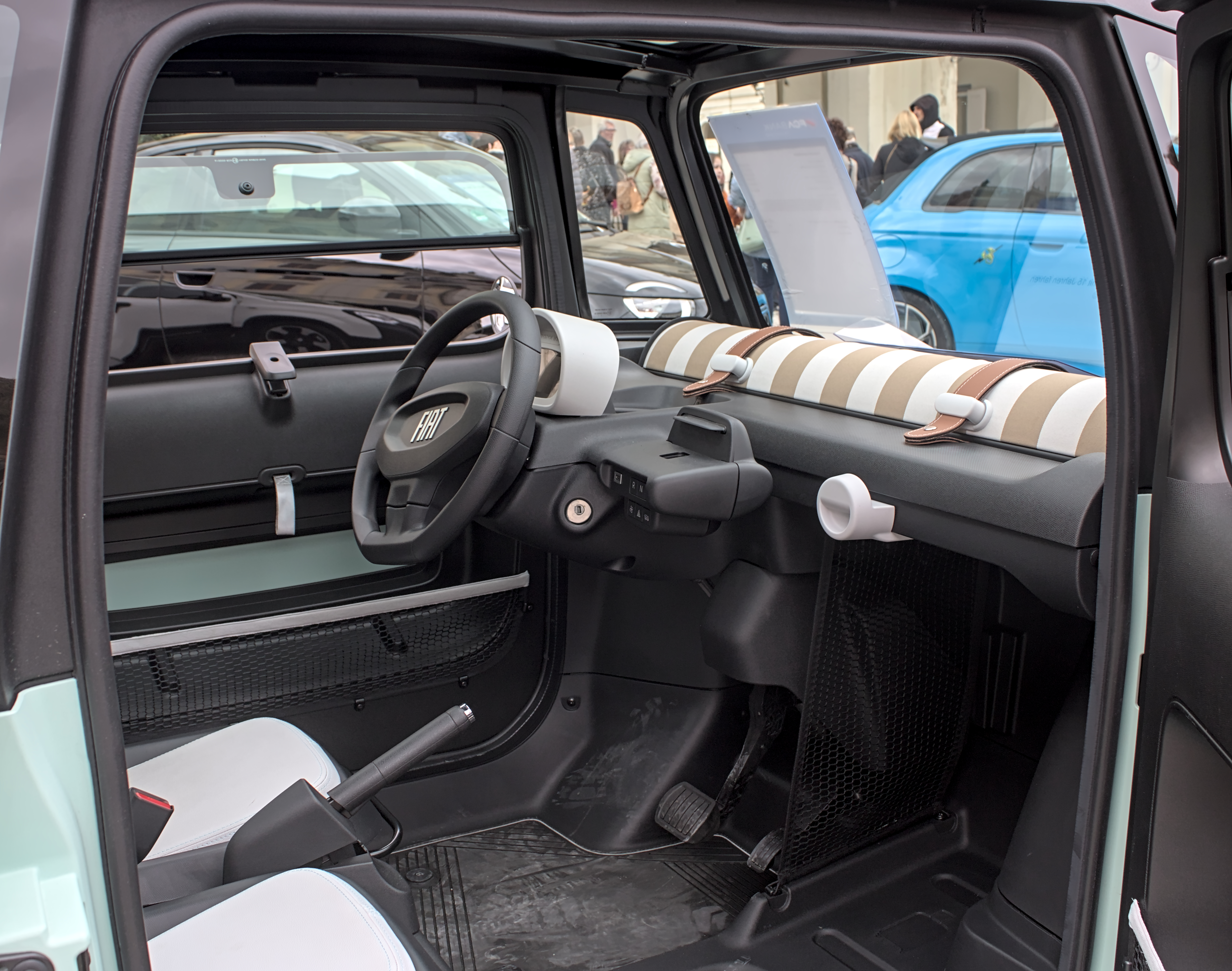
Fiat Topolino (interior)

== Technical characteristics ==
To save costs, the body is completely symmetrical; not only left-right symmetrical, but also front-rear symmetrical, except for the doors and the roof. The doors open in opposite directions, with the driver having a suicide door while the passenger door opens conventionally, allowing the same panels to be used. There are no other doors, making the storage spaces accessible only from the two side doors. All versions are left-hand drive, even those intended for use in the otherwise right-hand drive UK.

The vehicle measures 2.41 m (7 ft 11 in) in length, 1.39 m (4 ft 7 in) (excluding mirrors) in width and 1.52 m (5 ft 0 in) in height. Its total weight including battery is 485 kg (1,069 lb).

The quadricycle is equipped with a 6 kW electric motor operating at 48 V. It accepts a lithium-ion battery with a capacity of 5.5 kWh, rechargeable to 80% in three hours on a 230 V household outlet, giving it a maximum range of 75 km (47 mi) WMTC.

== Controversy ==
In May 2024, Italian customs blocked a shipment of 134 Fiat Topolinos at the port of Livorno, Tuscany, for having Italian flag stickers on the doors, despite being manufactured in Kenitra, Morocco. An investigation was launched against Stellantis, Italy, deeming the stickers to be a violation of the 2004 financial law, which defines as illegal "the marketing of products bearing false and misleading indications of provenance or origin". A Stellantis representative said that the company had "operated in full compliance with the rules, transparently communicating the Topolino's country of production, without any intention of misleading consumers" and that "the sticker in question was intended solely to indicate the product's entrepreneurial origin." Stellantis agreed to remove the stickers in order to resolve the situation.
