= Citroën C-Zero =

French car model

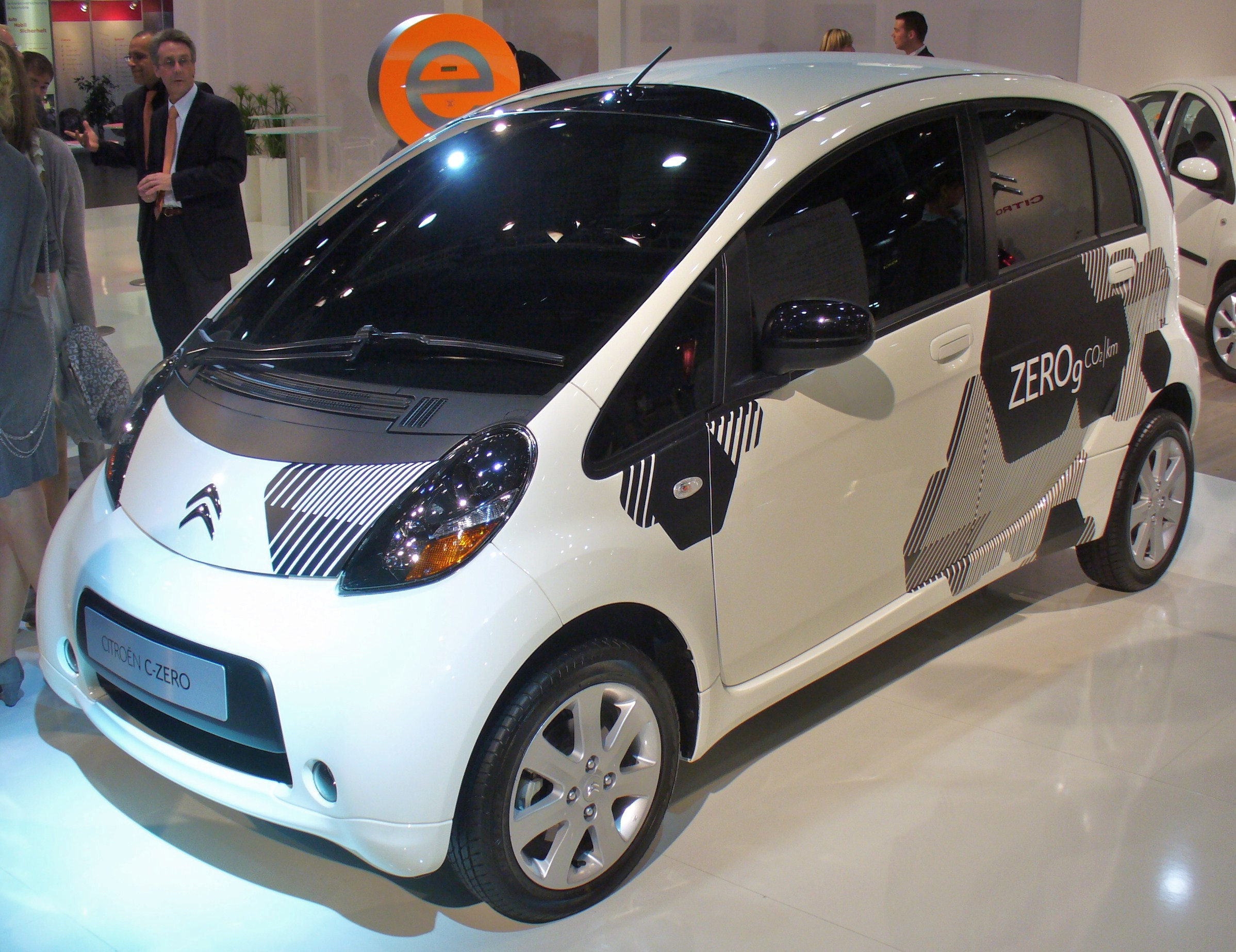

Overview
- Manufacturer: Citroën
- Also called: Peugeot iOn; Mitsubishi i-MiEV; Mitsuoka Like
- Production: 2010–2020
- Assembly: Japan: Kurashiki, Okayama (Mizushima Plant, 2010-2012); Spain: Vigo, Galicia (Vigo Plant, 2012-2020)

Body and chassis
- Class: City car (A)
- Body style: 5-door hatchback
- Layout: RMR

Chronology
- Successor: Citroën Ami

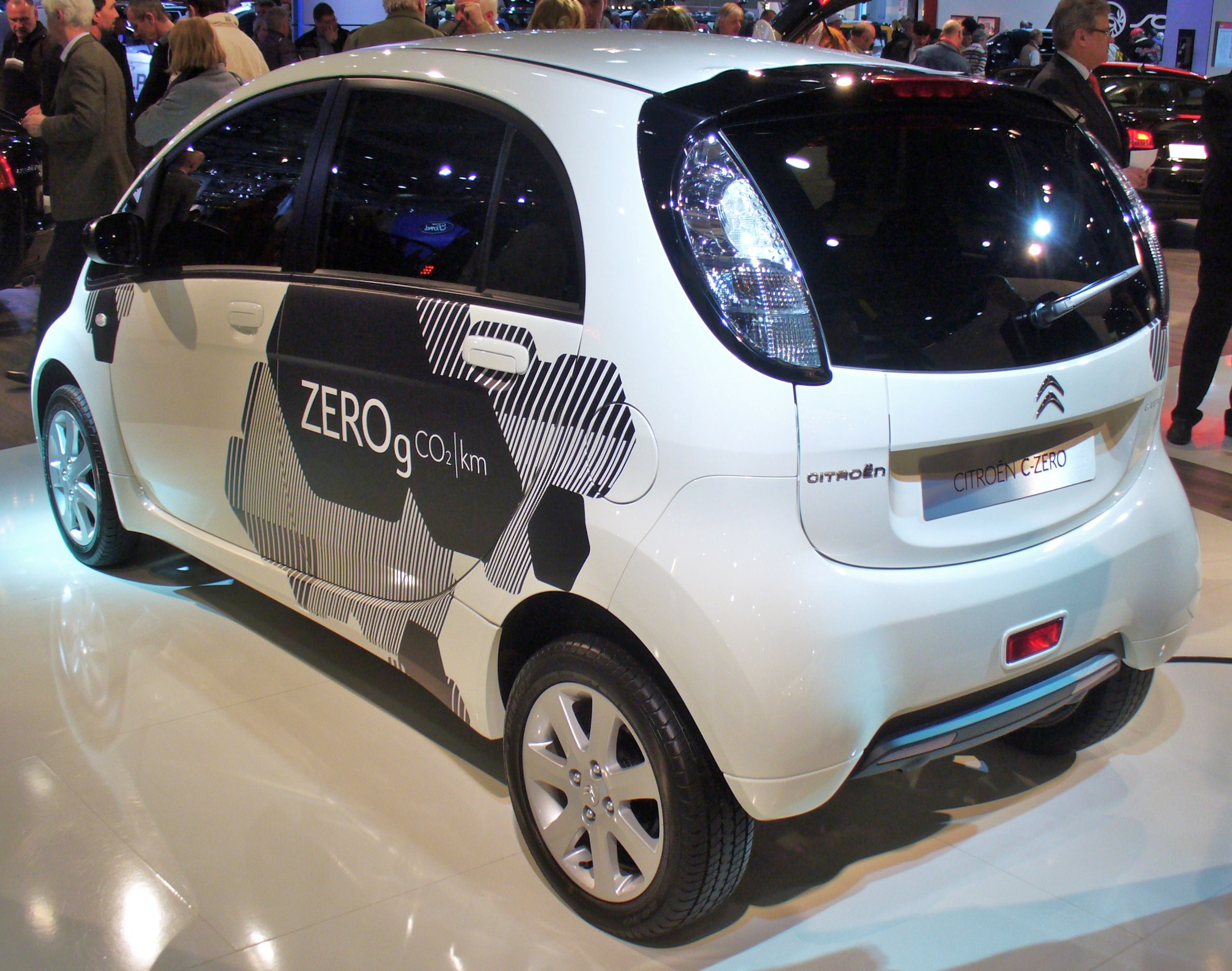
Citroën C-Zero rear.

The Citroën C-ZERO is a supermini/city car produced by Citroën and is 100% electric powered. It was developed in collaboration with Mitsubishi Motors Corporation (MMC). Its sister was marketed by Peugeot as the Peugeot iOn. The changes between the cars are the different exterior and interior styling and the price. The C-Zero was sold until 2020, when it was replaced by the Ami.

== Description ==
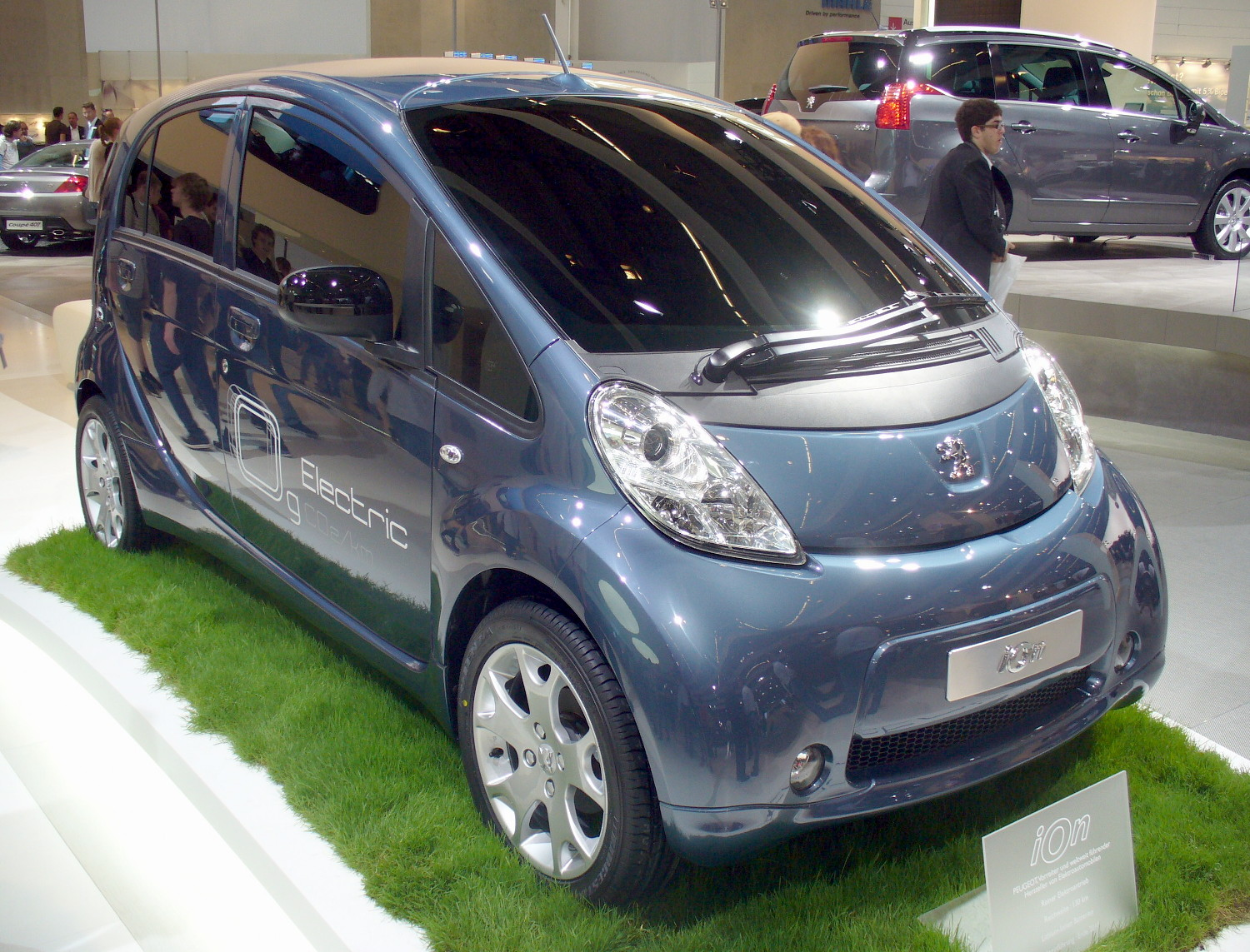
Peugeot iOn.

The C-ZERO is the French version of the Mitsubishi i-MiEV electric vehicle, based on the Mitsubishi i a kei car sold in Japan, and is the result of the partnership between PSA and Mitsubishi. After the Peugeot iOn was presented at the Frankfurt Auto Show, the Citroen C-ZERO marks the second part of the marketing of electric vehicles in Europe. The C-ZERO expands Citroëns small-vehicle range with a 100% electric car. It is designed to facilitate urban mobility: small size, quick charging and sufficient range for daily commutes.

== History ==
Citroën had already tried to produce an electric car in the 1990s; it was a variation of the Citroën Saxo which proved too expensive because the cost of batteries and had limited range, so this initiative did not go beyond the experimental stage (only 5,500 units were sold).

== Technical details ==
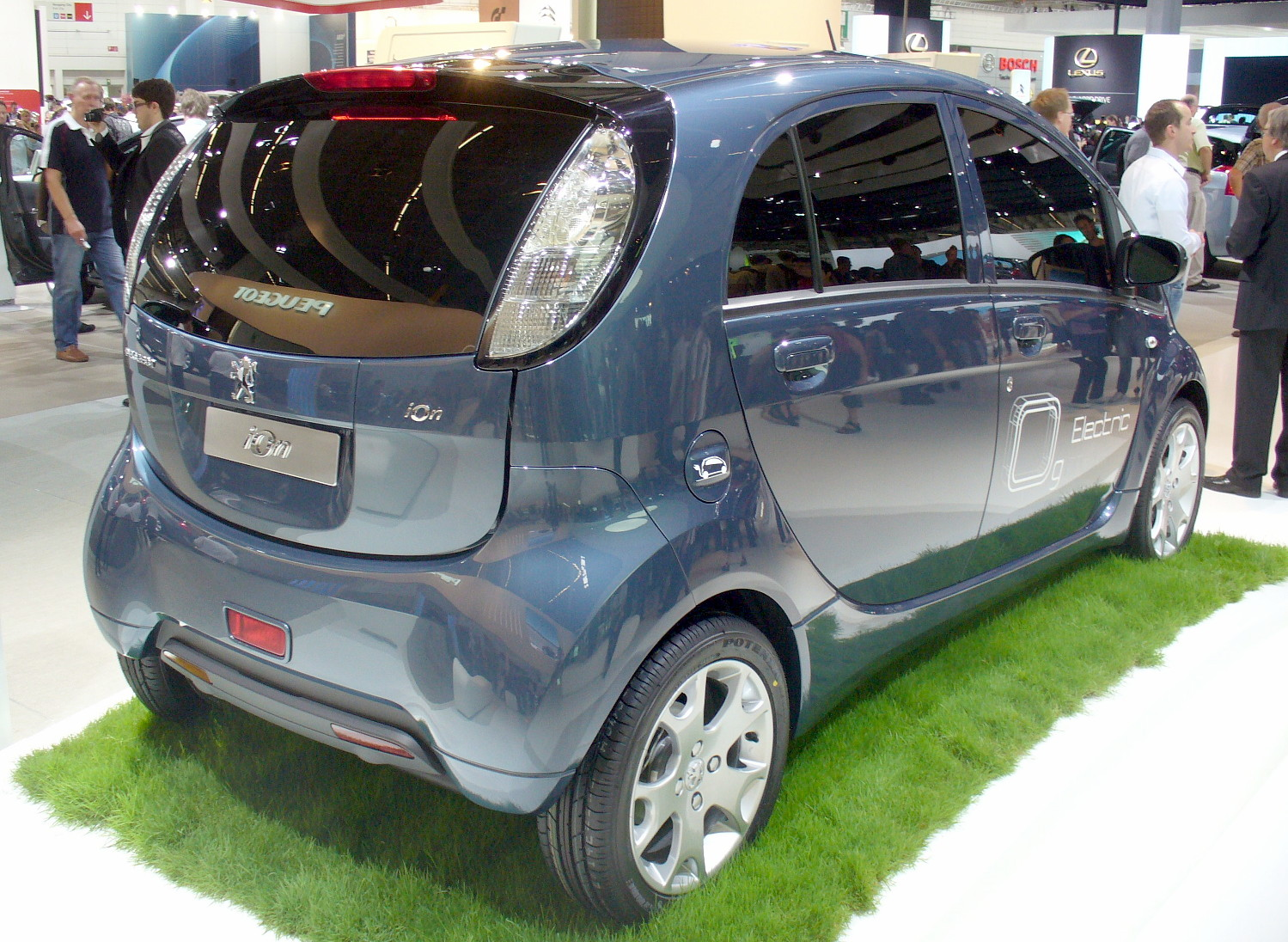
Peugeot iOn rear.

=== Motor ===
The C-ZERO has an electric motor which delivers 47 kilowatts or 64 horsepower 3,000 to 6,000 rpm. Its maximum torque is 180 Nm from 0 to 2,000 rpm. The motor is powered by lithium-ion batteries, located in the centre of the vehicle. This technology offers a limited battery weight compared to traditional technologies.

=== Performance ===
In terms of performance, C-ZERO has a maximum speed of 130 km/h (81 mph), goes from 0 to 100 km/h (62 mph) in 15s and 60 km/h (37 mph) to 90 km/h (56 mph) in 6 seconds. The range of the car is 130 km (81 mi).

=== Facilities ===
The C-ZERO has four seats and a trunk of 166 litres of volume. It offers many feature for comforts and security: power steering, ESP, six airbags, telematics, and independent housing for emergency and air conditioning.

=== Utilisation ===
It takes six hours to fully charge the battery with a 230V electrical outlet at up to 16A. However, via an external CHAdeMO charger, it is possible to recharge the vehicle from empty to 80% in about 30 minutes.

The car is designed to be easy to use. The driver only has to turn the ignition key and a beep announces the start of the car. It drives similarly to a car with an automatic transmission, albeit with no gear changes. The fuel gauge is replaced by an indicator of battery charge.

== News ==
After the Peugeot iOn was presented at the last Frankfurt Auto Show, the Citroen C-ZERO marks the second part of the partnership between PSA and Mitsubishi to market electric vehicles in Europe. It will be offered to individuals, companies and administrations and local communities.

The C-ZERO was premiered at the World Exhibition in Brussels in January 2010 and will be launched on the market during the last quarter of 2010, like its sister the Peugeot iOn.

Citroën is continuing its development of electric cars, through its commercial vehicle, the Berlingo First Electric, in cooperation with the manufacturer specialist Venturi. It will be sold before next summer.

== Safety ==
Euro NCAP results available for the C-ZERO look like a step backwards compared to many newer cars, but still around the average for a small hatchback. The tested model was a left hand drive 5-door hatchback registered in 2011:

- Overall:
- Adult Occupant 73%
- Child Occupant 78%
- Pedestrian 48%
- Safety Assist 86%

Euro NCAP also states that "Accordingly, Euro NCAP believes that the star rating of the i-MiEV can also be applied to the Citroen C-Zero." This appears to be because the Citroen C-ZERO is a rebadged Mitsubishi i-MiEV and has the same interior structure and equipment.

== See also ==
- Mitsubishi i-MiEV
- Electric car
