= Stellantis Kenitra plant =

Car plant in Morocco

Coordinates: 34.3131°N 6.3705°W

The Stellantis Kenitra plant is a car plant located in located in Ameur Seflia, Kénitra Province, Morocco, owned by international manufacturing group Stellantis. The plant started its operations in June 2019 with an annual output of approximately 200,000 cars.

The plant is designed by Still Industrial and is considered one of the most important industrial plants in Morocco.

In July 2025, Stellantis announced a major expansion of the manufacturing facility, investing €1.2 billion and aiming to double production capacity.

== Vehicles assembled ==
- Peugeot 208 II (2019–present)
- Citroën Ami (2020–present)
- Opel Rocks Electric (2021–present)
- Fiat Topolino (2023–present)
