= Suicide door =

Automobile door hinged at its opposite side rather than the front

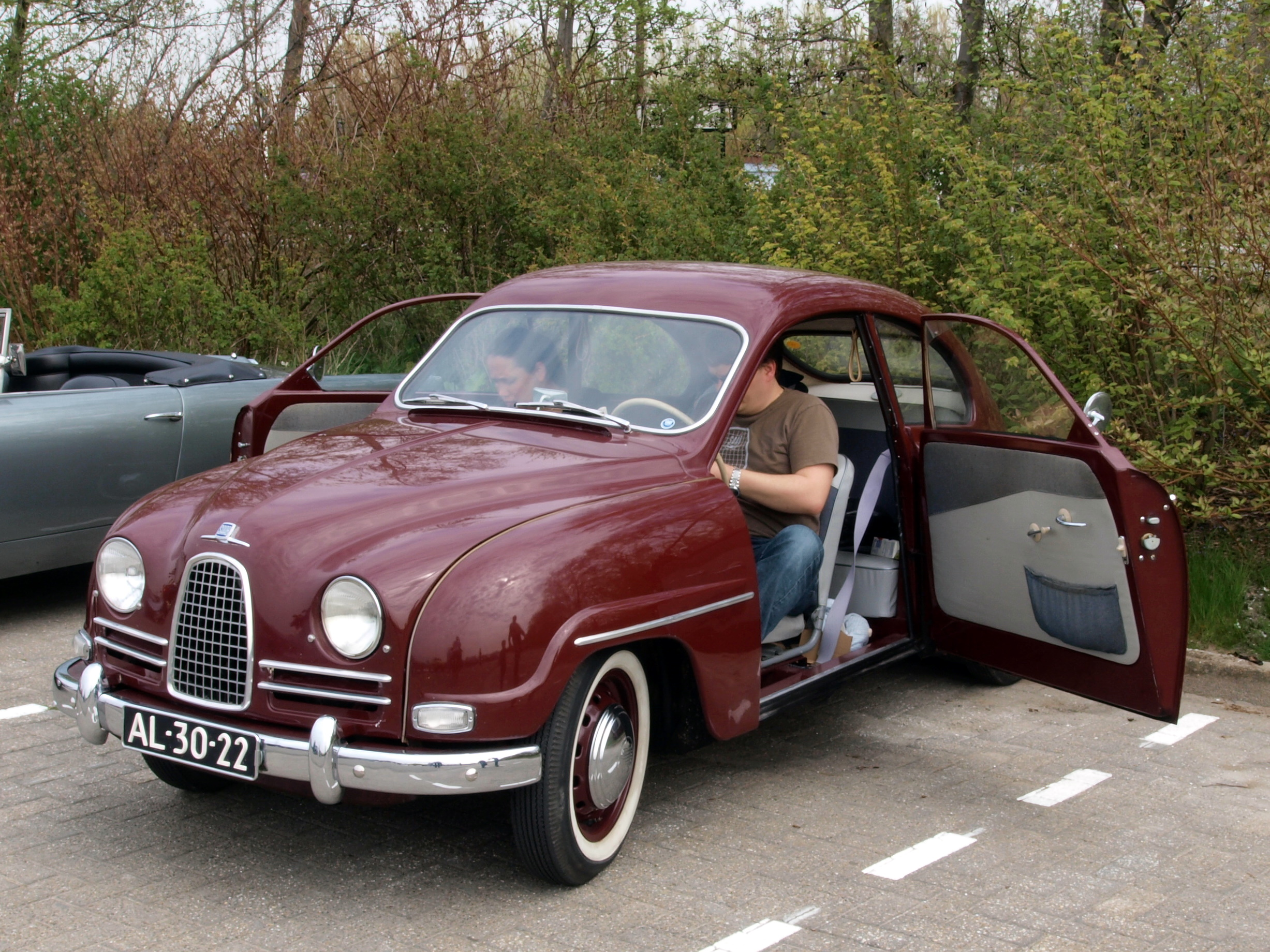
Suicide doors on a Saab 93B

A suicide door is an automobile door hinged at its rear rather than the front. Such doors were originally used on horse-drawn carriages, but are less common on modern vehicles than front-hinged doors, primarily because they are considered less safe.

If the vehicle were moving and the rear-hinged door opened, aerodynamic drag would force the door open, and someone must lean out of the vehicle to reach the handle to close it. As seat belts were not commonly used in the early days of cars having suicide doors, the person reaching could easily fall out of the car and into traffic, hence the name "suicide door."

Initially standard on many models, they later also became popularized as a modification on custom cars. Automobile manufacturers call the doors coach doors (Rolls-Royce), flexdoors (Vauxhall), freestyle doors (Mazda), rear access doors (Saturn), clamshell doors (BMW), or simply back-hinged doors.

== History ==
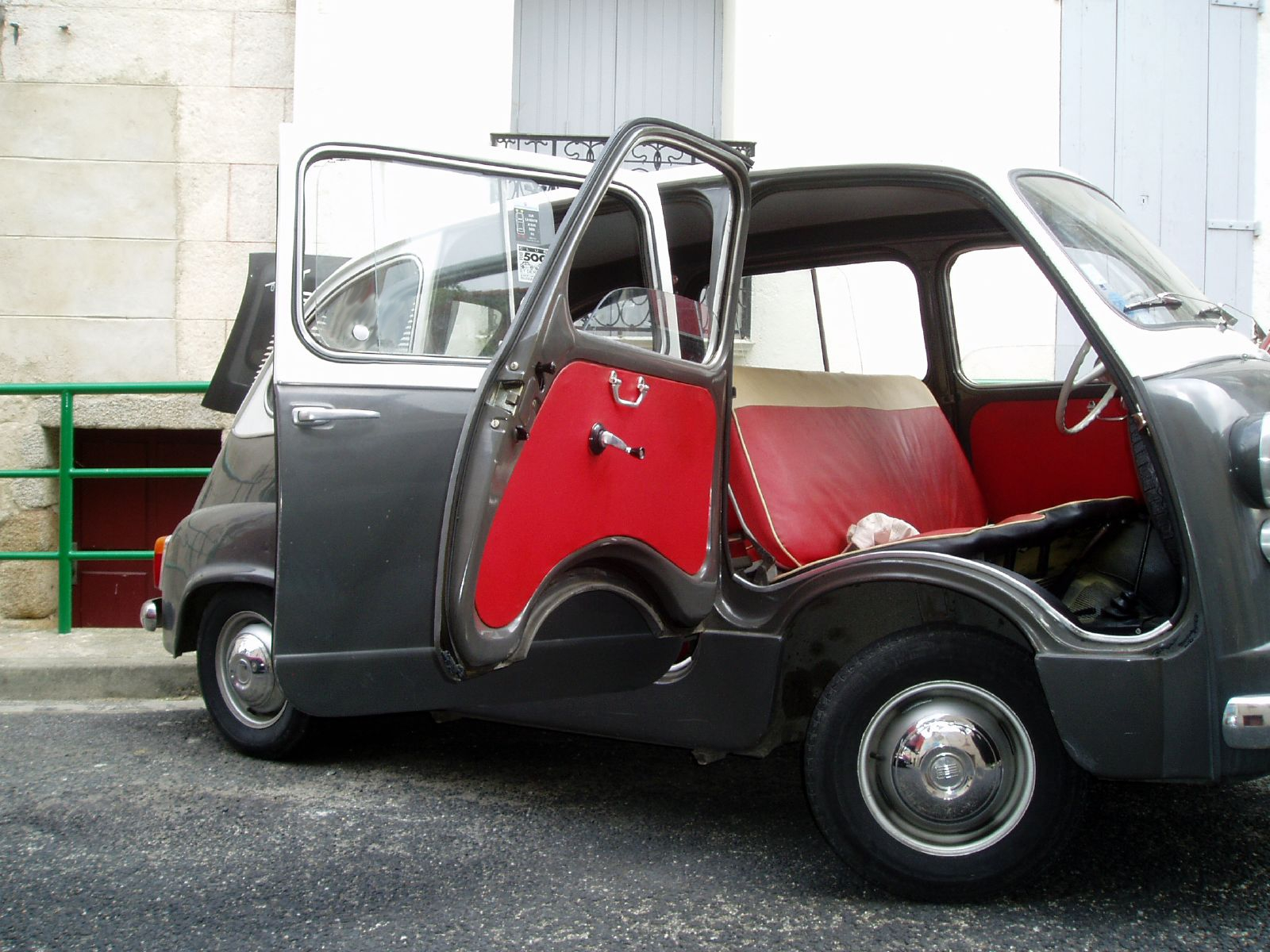
The Fiat 600 Multipla with front suicide doors, right side doors open. Note that all four doors are connected to the B-pillars.

Rear-hinged doors were common on cars manufactured in the first half of the 20th century, including the Citroën Traction Avant. In the era before seat belts, the accidental opening of such doors meant that there was a greater risk of falling out of the vehicle compared to front-hinged doors, where airflow pushed the doors closed rather than opening them further.

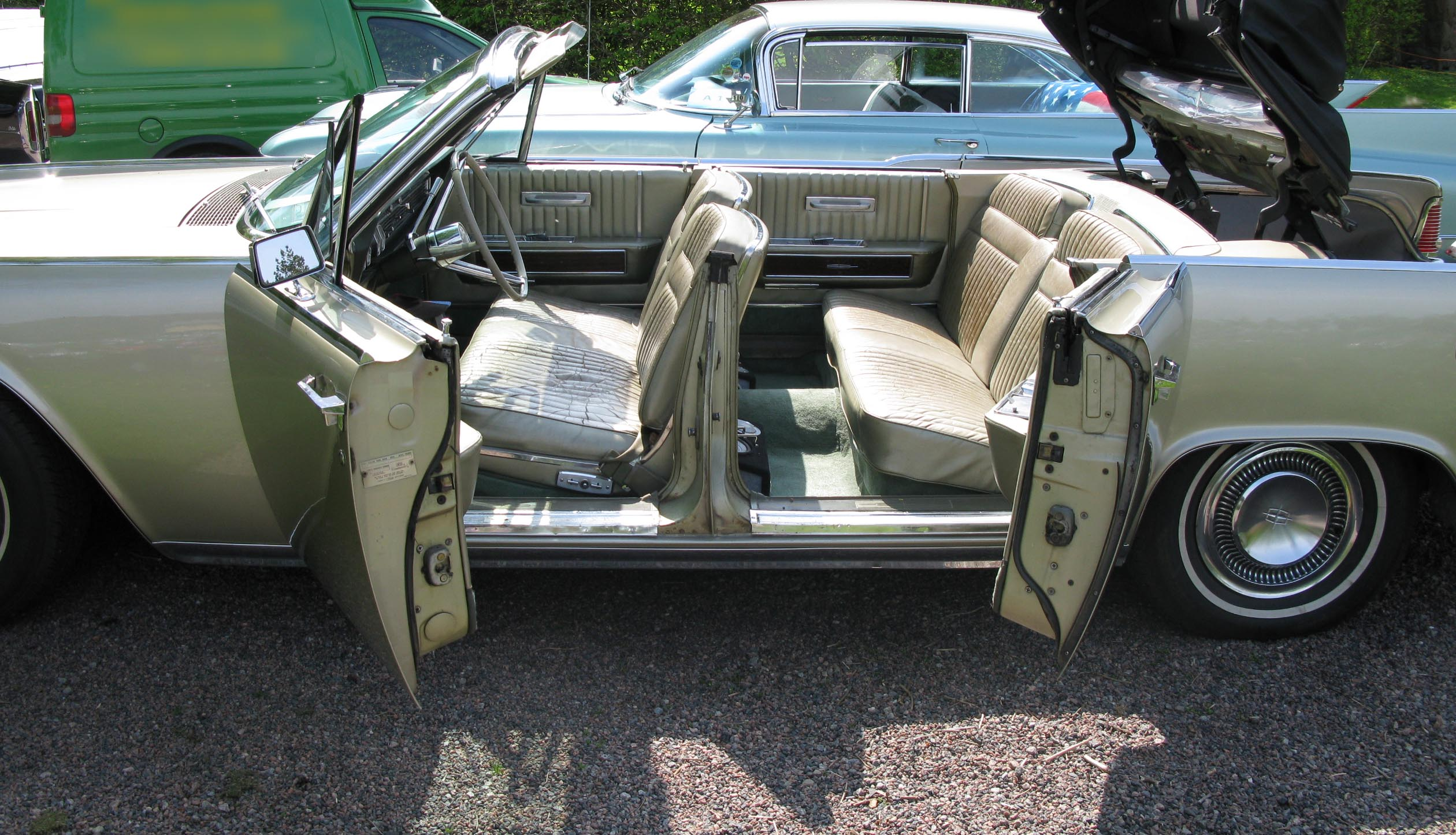
Lincoln Continental with rear suicide doors, left-side doors open

Some have suggested that rear-hinged doors were especially popular with mobsters in the gangster era of the 1930s, supposedly owing to the ease of pushing passengers out of moving vehicles with the air around the moving car holding the door open.

After World War II, rear-hinged doors were mostly limited to rear doors of four-door sedans. The best-known use of rear-hinged doors on post-World War II American automobiles was the Lincoln Continental four-door convertibles and sedans (1961–1969), Cadillac Eldorado Brougham (1956–1959) four-door sedans, and Ford Thunderbird (1967–1971) four-door sedans. The British Rover P4 used rear-hinged doors at the rear. German Goggomobil saloons and coupes had two-door bodies with rear-hinged doors until 1964.

== Modern use ==
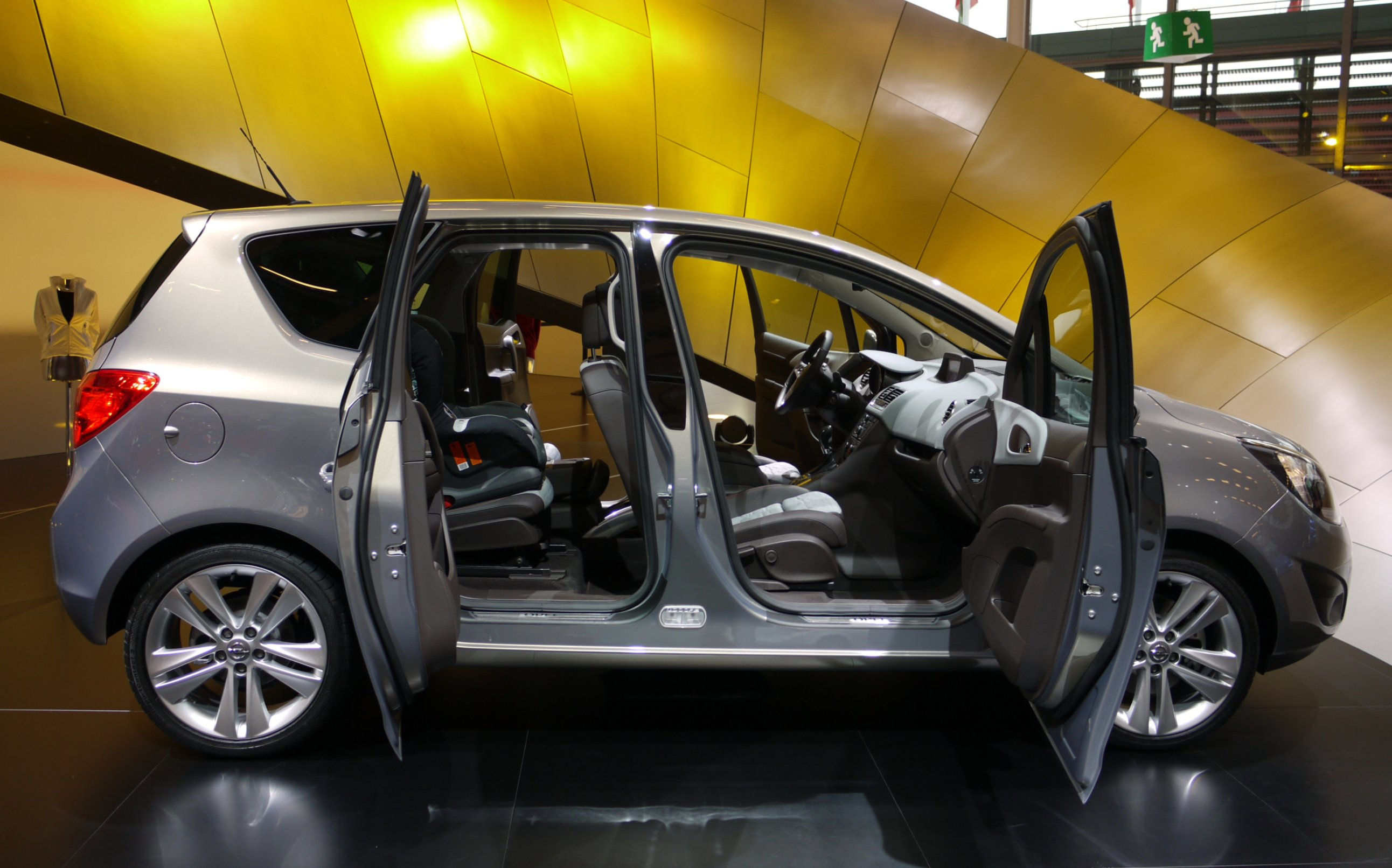
2010 Opel Meriva

In 2003, the new Rolls-Royce Phantom reintroduced independent rear-hinged doors in luxury vehicle applications, with the company continuing to use the design on subsequent models. Most recent mass-produced models with suicide doors have only used the design on the rear doors, such as the Opel Meriva in 2010, the Rolls-Royce Cullinan in 2018, and the HiPhi X in 2020. Lincoln announced that 80 limited-edition 2019 Continentals would be made with "coach" doors, marking the Continental's 80th anniversary. The 2020 Citroen Ami electric vehicle is unusual in having a suicide door for the driver but a conventional door for the passenger, as the doors are identical units that are not differentiated by side.

Many concept cars have featured rear-hinged doors, although they often do not end up on the subsequent production versions. Examples include the Lincoln C, a hatchback with no B-pillar and rear-hinged doors at the rear, and the Carbon Motors Corporation E7, a police car with rear rear-hinged doors designed to aid officers getting handcuffed passengers in and out of the back seat.

At the end of the 20th century, companies experimented with a new rear-hinged door design: rear-hinged rear doors that are held closed by the front doors, and cannot be opened until released by opening the front door on the same side (hinged at the front). Such doors are sometimes referred to as clamshell doors. This door design lacks a fixed B-pillar between the front and rear doors, often requiring the car to have additional reinforcements in the sills and roof of the car, as well as in the door structure. Porsche created a prototype in the late 1980s based on the 928 "Study H50". In the 1990s, a number of concepts with this style of door were released, including the 1990 Pontiac Sunfire, 1997 Pontiac Rageous and 1997 Mercury MC4. In the early 2000s, this style of door appeared on a number of production vehicles. Examples include most extended-cab pickup trucks, the Saturn SC, Saturn Ion Quad Coupe, Honda Element, Toyota FJ Cruiser, BMW i3, Mini Cooper Clubman, Mazda RX-8, Mazda MX-30 and Fiat 500 3+1.

Examples of suicide doors

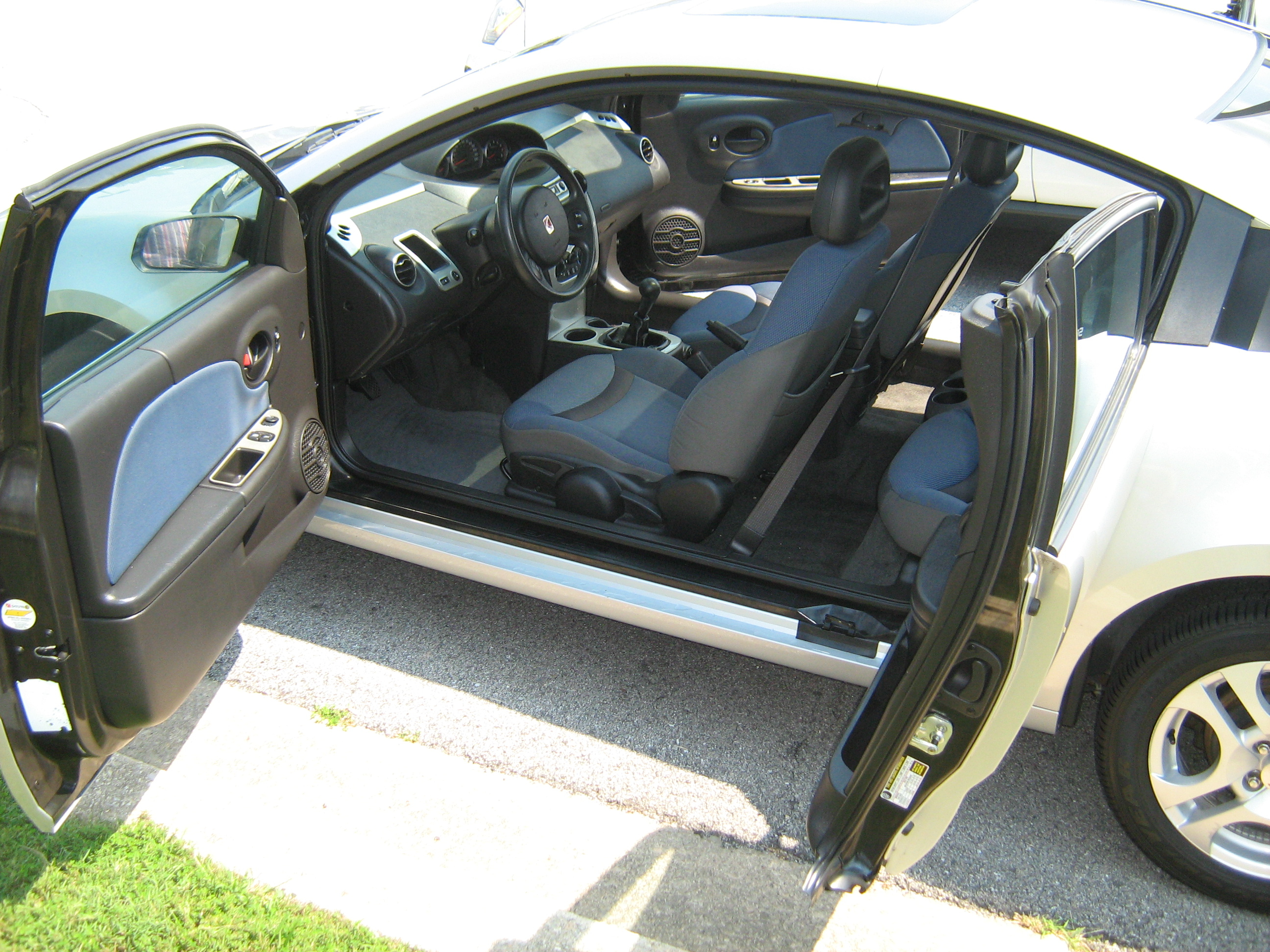
2002—2007 Saturn Ion Quad Coupe

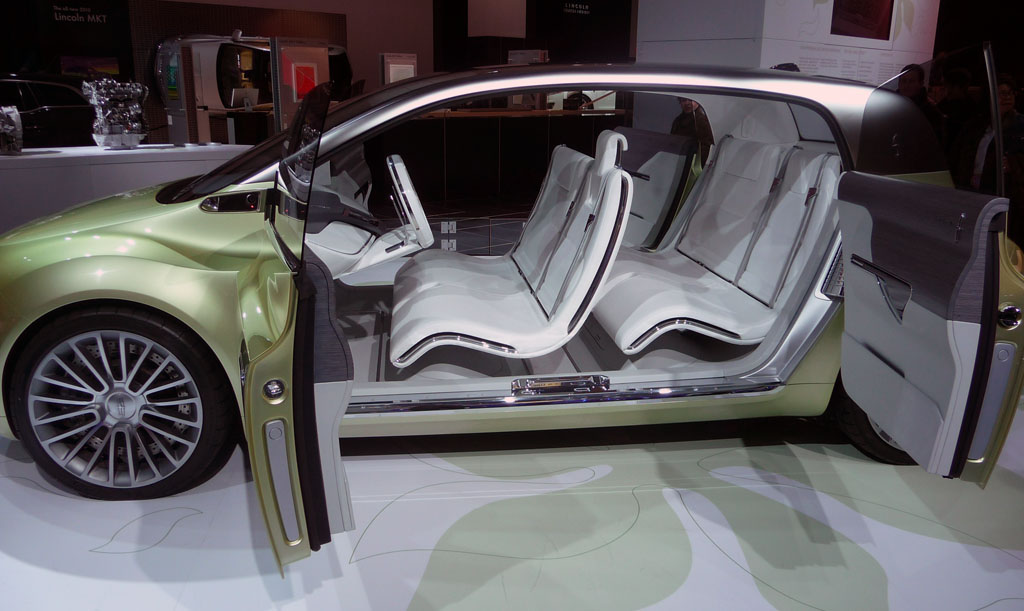
Lincoln C concept car from 2009 with rear suicide doors, left side doors open. Note that there is no B-pillar and therefore there are two pillars, A and C.

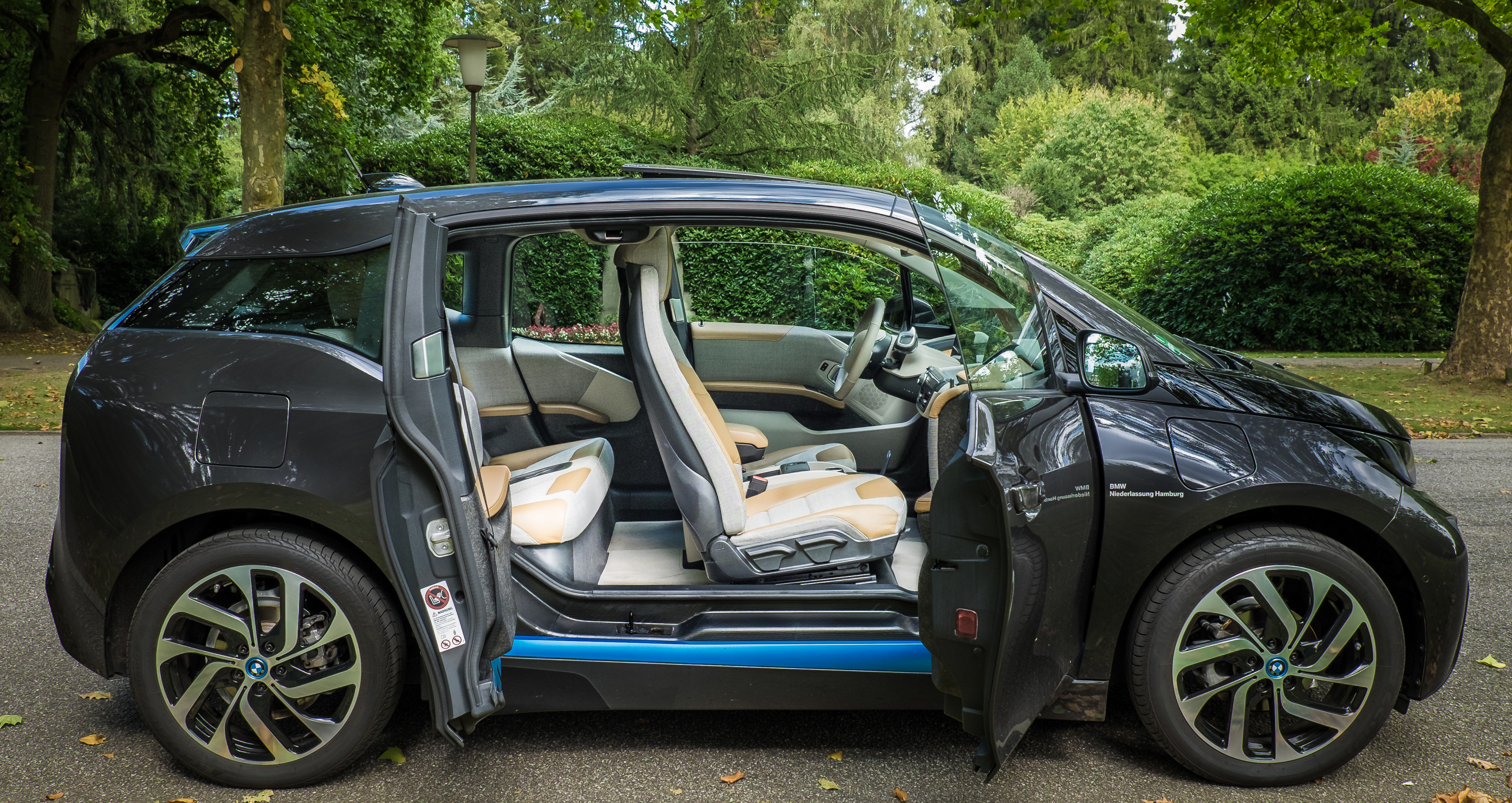
2013 BMW i3

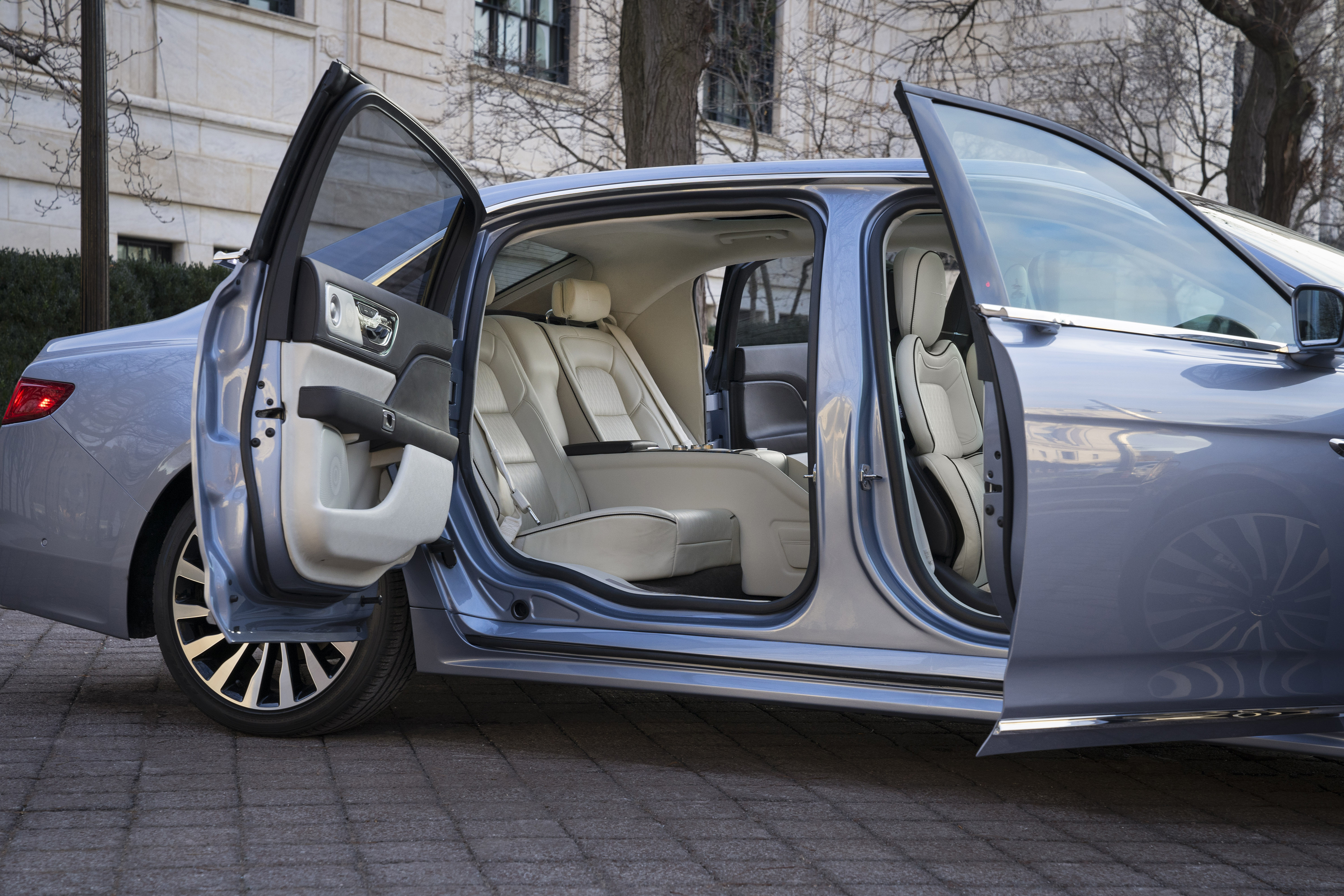
2020 Lincoln Continental Coach Door Edition

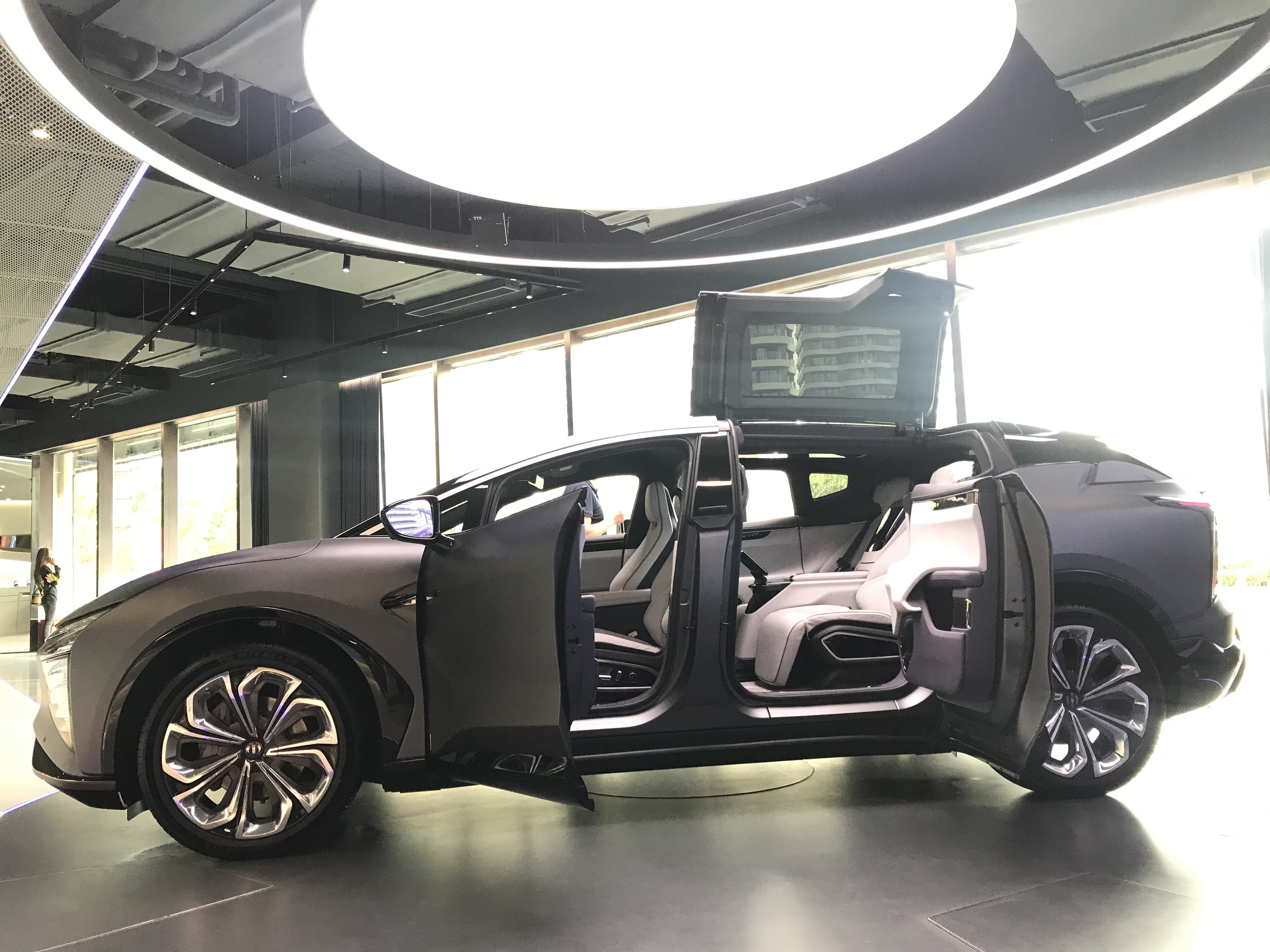
2021 HiPhi X

== Advantages ==
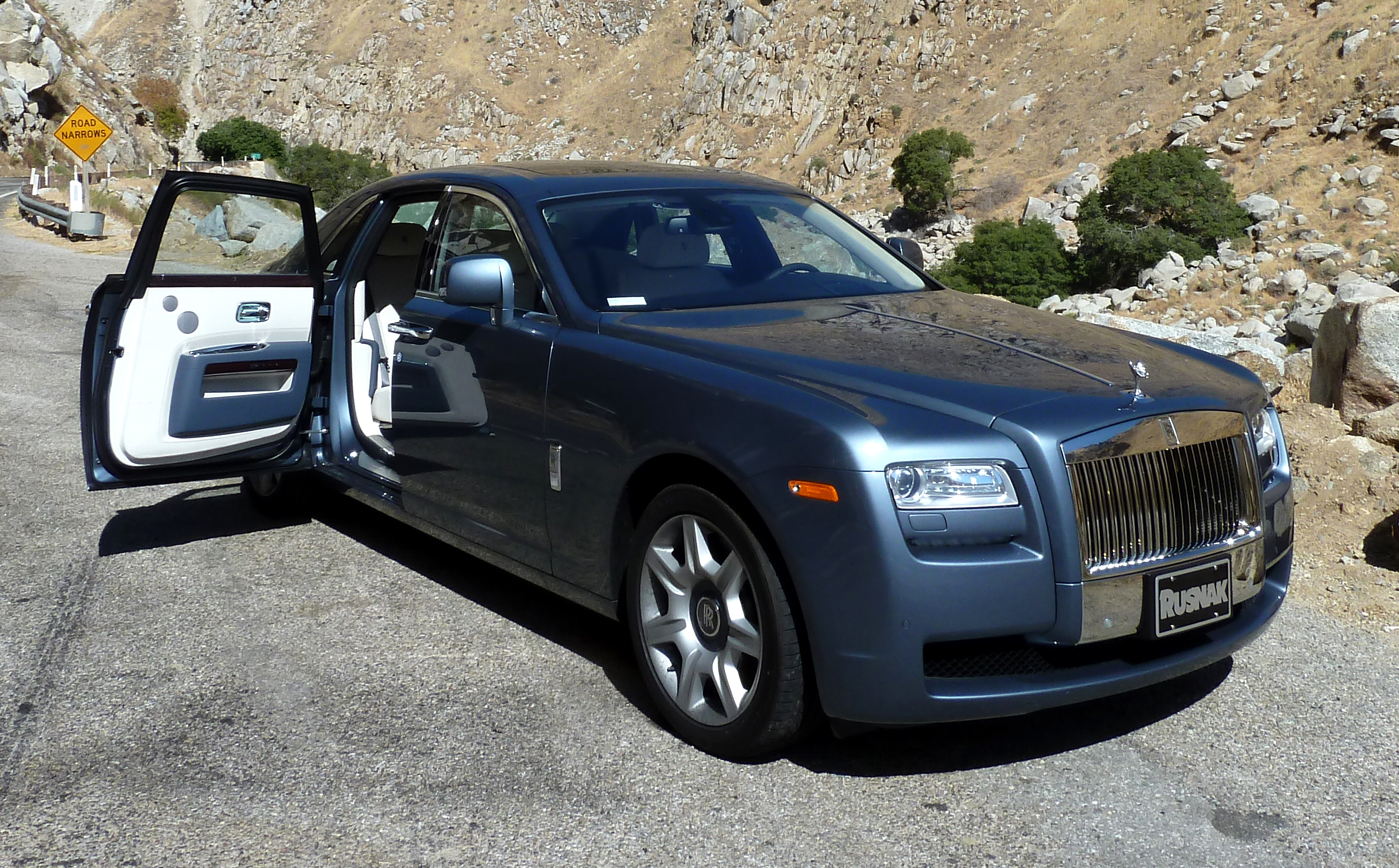
An open rear suicide door on a Rolls-Royce Ghost

Rear-hinged doors make entering and exiting a vehicle easier, allowing a passenger to enter by turning to sit and exit by stepping forward and out. This is important for passengers who need to make a dignified entrance; the UK State Bentley has rear-opening passenger doors that are broader than usual and open very wide, allowing the monarch to exit the car in a dignified way.

In combination with traditional front doors, rear-hinged doors allow chauffeurs easier access to the rear door. In Austin FX4 taxis, drivers were able to reach the rear exterior door handle through the driver's window without getting out of the vehicle.

Rear-hinged doors also allow a better position for a person installing a child seat into the back seat of a vehicle than conventional doors, while being simpler and cheaper to build than the sliding doors commonly used on minivans. The Opel Meriva B compact MPV introduced in 2010 had such doors.

The combination of front-hinged front doors and rear-hinged rear doors allows for a design without a fixed B-pillar, creating a large opening for entering and exiting the vehicle.

== Disadvantages ==
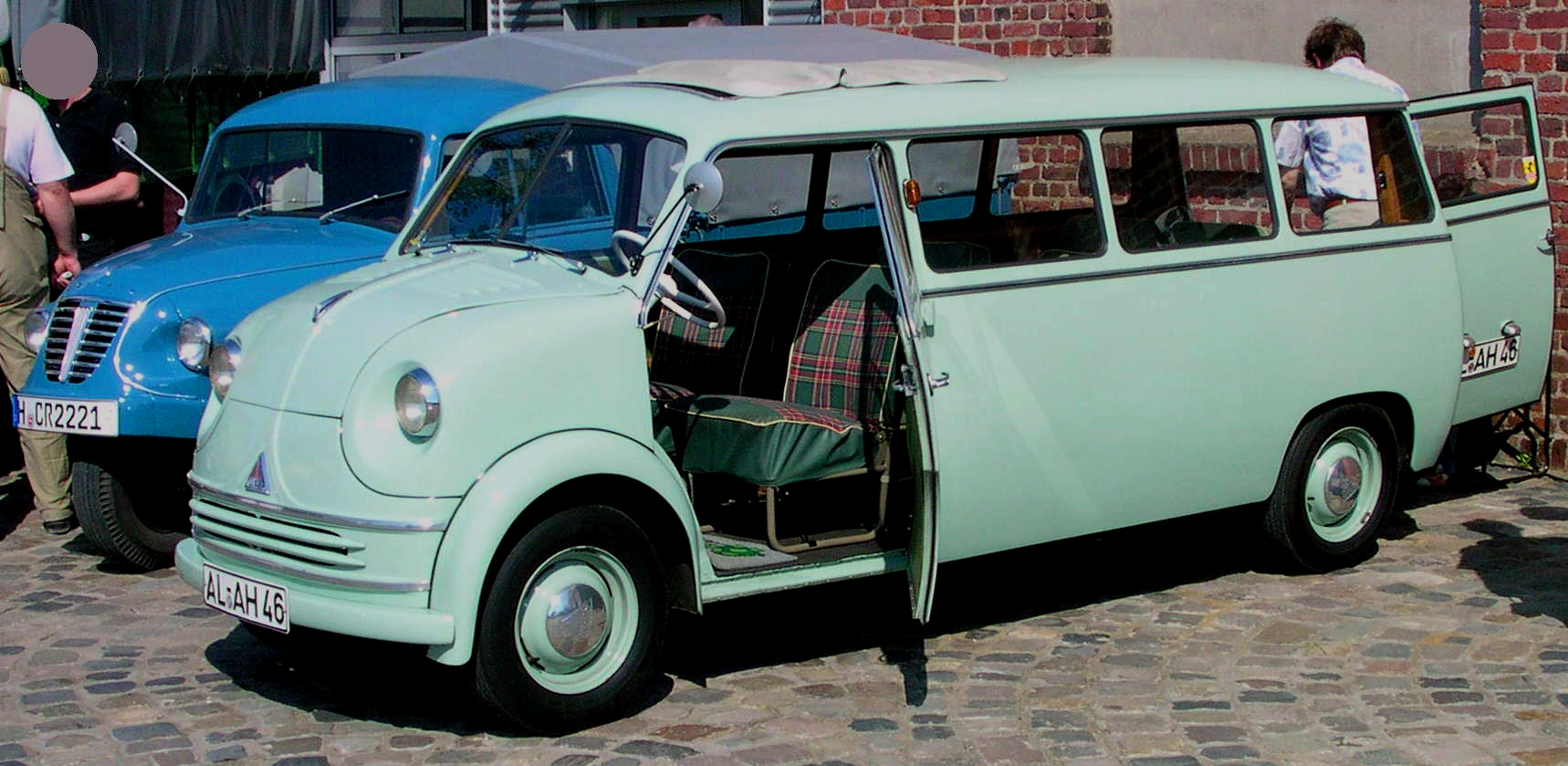
Lloyd LT 600 van with front suicide doors

When front doors are directly adjacent to rear suicide doors, exiting and entering the vehicle can be awkward if people try to use the front and back doors at the same time.

There are also a number of safety hazards:

- Aerodynamic factors forcing rear-hinged doors open at speed in older cars. In 1969, Consumer Reports reported this problem on a Subaru 360.
- If a person not wearing a seat belt falls out of a moving car with a coach door, the door can catch them and drag them along the road at speed, causing serious injuries.
- If a person exits a vehicle while parallel parked and a car hits the door from the rear, the person would be crushed instead of the door being ripped off.

Car manufacturers mitigate these hazards with such safety features as seat belts, and locks requiring front-hinged doors be open before permitting rear-hinged doors to open.

== See also ==
- Butterfly doors
- Canopy doors
- Gull-wing doors
- List of cars with non-standard door designs
- Scissor doors
- Sliding doors
- Swan doors
