= Ameur Seflia =

Ameur Seflia عامرالسفلية
- Rural commune and town
- Location within Morocco
- Coordinates: 34°18′40″N 6°24′58″W
- Country: Morocco
- Region: Rabat-Salé-Kénitra
- Province: Kenitra

Population (2014)
  - Total: 28,540
- Time zone: UTC+0 (GMT)

Ameur Seflia is a small town and rural commune in Kenitra Province of the Rabat-Salé-Kénitra region of Morocco.

At the time of the 2014 census, the commune had a total population of 28,540 people living in 4,882 households.

== See also ==
- PSA Kenitra plant
