= Pontiac Rageous =

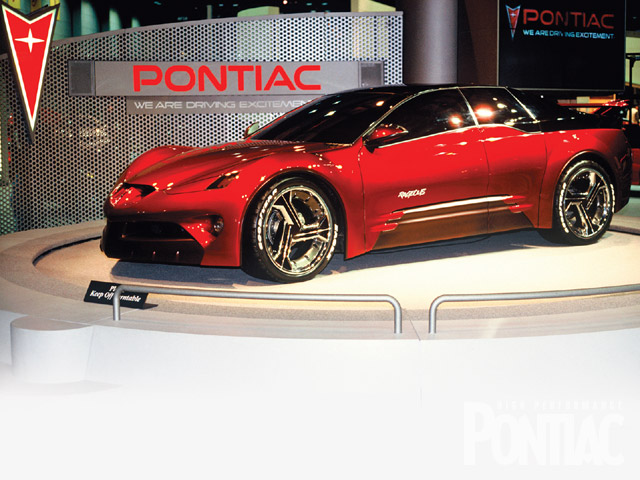

Overview
- Manufacturer: General Motors
- Production: 1997
- Assembly: Detroit, Michigan

Body and chassis
- Body style: 4-door quad coupe
- Doors: Suicide (rear)

Powertrain
- Engine: 5.7L V8
- Transmission: 5-speed manual

The Pontiac Rageous is a 4-door concept car built by Pontiac. It appeared at the 1997 North American International Auto Show. The car had two standard front doors and two rear suicide doors similar to extended cab trucks. The car also had a two-piece rear hatch, splitting into a drop down tailgate and a lift back hatch. The rear storage area was massive and lined with rubber to make for easy maintenance. The car's V8 produced 315 horsepower (235 kilowatts) and 335 ft-lbs (454 newton-meters). Weighing about 4,600 lbs, the car could go from 0-60 MPH in 5.5 seconds.
