= World Motorcycle Test Cycle =

The World Motorcycle Test Cycle (WMTC) is a system of driving cycles used to measure fuel consumption and emissions in motorcycles. The methods are stipulated as part of the Global Technical Regulation established under the United Nations’ World Forum for Harmonisation of Vehicle Regulations, also known as WP.29.

In the European Union, as in other legislative regions, precise limits for vehicle emissions are prescribed by law. However, exhaust emissions are inherently rather variable making it difficult to reliably reproduce test scores. The goal of these Test Cycles is to define, in detail, standardised driving cycles that can be performed using a finished vehicle (rather than an engine test rig) which can be used repeatedly with the expectation that consistent results will be produced. The driving cycles are intended to represent typical driving conditions.

For example, a motorcycle's wheels are placed in contact with a set of rollers which can be adjusted to simulate friction losses and aerodynamic resistance. The motorcycle is then accelerated and braked in a variety of patterns to represent a particular type of real-world operation. Therefore, statistical conclusions on pollutants emitted or fuel consumed by a variety of vehicles and testers (e.g. manufacturers) can be:

- compared directly to each other
- used for assessments against legislative controls
- retested to validate the original testing results

and for manufacturers

- only one test procedure is needed since it has global recognition

The specific drive cycles applied to motorcycles are labelled WMTC

For consumers, when a manufacturer quotes consumption, emission or other statistics referencing WMTC, they can be compared directly against other manufacturers also referencing WMTC. If a manufacturer does not reference this standard, then a consumer can only take on faith that the statistics offered are both representative and valid. Also, it seems the reliability of these (WMTC) tests might be accelerating the introduction of new technologies to reduce emissions and improve fuel economy - for the benefit of consumers.

== Adoptions ==
These standards have emanated from within the EU under the auspices of the UNECE but their use worldwide is neither obligatory nor can they be enforced. However, in order to sell motorcycles within a regulated market, such as the European Union for example, manufacturers must meet WMTC emission standards which means effectively they must also adopt these test cycles.

- after 2017: all European manufacturers are obliged to use WMTC
- Brazil, Chile, Indonesia, Singapore, Thailand, Vietnam adopted prior to 2016
- July 2014: India harmonised its testing cycle with the WMTC effective from 2016/2017
- July 2013: Japan's four domestic motorcycle manufacturers - Honda, Kawasaki, Suzuki & Yamaha - began using WMTC data in their literature.
- since 2006: in the US, WMTC is accepted as an optional regime to the local FTP

== Issues ==
- the initial standard referenced existing regulations in Europe (NEDC), Japan, and the USA. However India objected that these standards did not represent typical driving conditions in that market being significantly different for the huge population of 2 and 3-wheel vehicles in use in India. Consequently, a revised standard included input from the Indian Driving Cycle (IDC) as well. Nonetheless, while the WMTC is recognised as the best attempt so far, it is only a model of real-world driving and quite a difficult one to replicate by an ordinary rider.
- the WMTC standards do not include any test or reference for durability requirements (i.e. the behaviour of a motorcycle after type-approval has been granted) such as those applied in Taiwan (15,000 km), India (30,000 km) and USA (30,000 km). Studies perceived such tests to be problematic for a variety of reasons despite their growing importance. Future, possibly as early as 2017, revisions of WMTC are expected to include Durability Requirements
- some manufacturers have been critical of the generalisation from the measured driving-cycle consumption to an mpg statistic i.e. the algorithm used to compute an mpg value from measurements
- the system remains open to abuse as with cycle beating where on-board-computers dynamically adjusted performance when test driving cycles were detected
- manufacturers are finding it increasingly difficult to produce high-performance machines which can pass emission controls due in large part to the nature of such engines
- emissions control generally has virtually halted the production of 2-stroke engines in favour of 4-stroke engines across all classes of motorcycle
