= Tolba =

Tolba is a surname and place name. Notable people and places with this name include:

== Places ==
- Aïn Tolba, a municipality in Algeria
- Majmaa Tolba, a commune in Morocco
- M'Qam Tolba, a commune in Morocco
- Souk Tolba, a commune in Morocco
- Staraya Tolba, a village in Russia

== People with the surname ==
- Hamada Tolba (born 1981), Egyptian footballer
- Islam Tolba (born 1989), Egyptian amateur Greco-Roman wrestler and Olympic competitor
- Magdy Tolba (born 1964), Egyptian footballer
- Mohamed Ould Tolba (born 1962), Mauritanian politician and teacher
- Mostafa Kamal Tolba (1922–2016), Egyptian biologist and civil servant
- Marwan Tolba, Palestinian-Canadian emergency medicine physician and activist
