= Sidi Allal El Bahraoui =

Sidi Allal El Bahraoui Kamouni
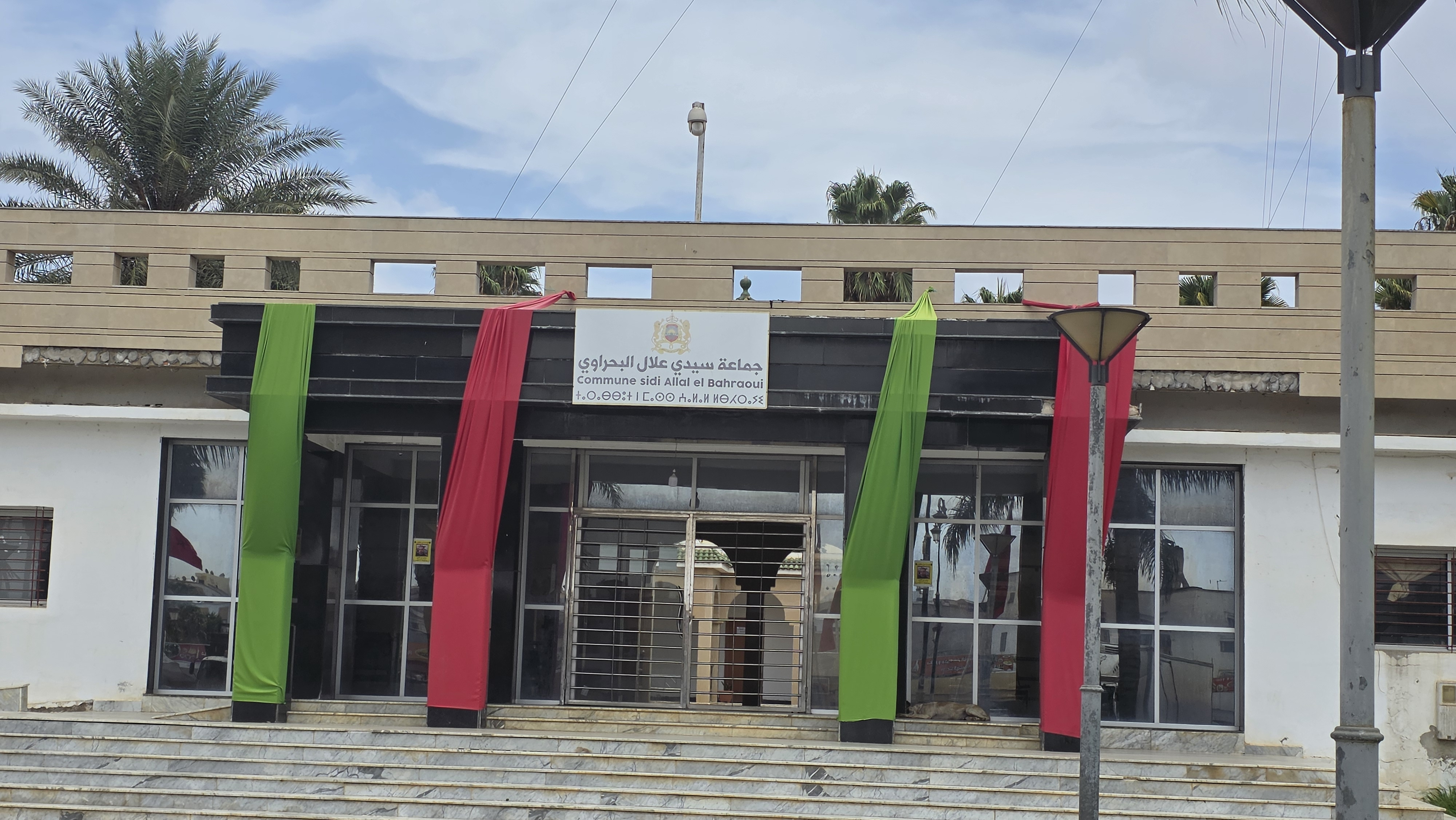
- Interactive map of Sidi Allal El Bahraoui
- Country: Morocco
- Region: Rabat-Salé-Kénitra
- Province: Khemisset

Population (2024)
  - Total: 29,147
- Time zone: UTC+0 (GMT)

Sidi Allal El Bahraoui, also known locally as Kamouni, is a town in Khémisset Province, Rabat-Salé-Kénitra, Morocco. At the 2024 census, its population was 29,147.

== History ==
The modern town was established during the French protectorate in Morocco as a military outpost on the Maamora Forest called 'Camp Moinier' (named after the french general Charles Émile Moinier) from which the name 'Kamouni' comes. After independence it was renamed to Sidi Allal El Bahraoui after a local saint.
