= Maaziz =

Mâaziz
- Town
- Location in Morocco
- Coordinates: 33°40′N 6°19′W
- Country: Morocco
- Region: Rabat-Salé-Kénitra
- Province: Khemisset

Population (2004)
  - Total: 9,190
- Time zone: UTC+0 (GMT)

Mâaziz is a town in Khémisset Province, Rabat-Salé-Kénitra, Morocco. According to the 2004 census, its population was 9,190.
