= Ait Mimoune =

- Commune
- Location within Morocco
- Coordinates: 33°46′48″N 5°46′48″W
- Country: Morocco
- Region: Rabat-Salé-Kénitra
- Province: Khemisset

Population (2004)
  - Total: 10,236
- Time zone: UTC+0 (GMT)

Ait Mimoune is a commune in the Khémisset Province of Morocco's Rabat-Salé-Kénitra administrative region. At the time of the 2004 census, the commune had a total population of 10,236 people living in 1918 households.
