= Moulay Driss Aghbal =

- Commune
- Location within Morocco
- Coordinates: 33°47′N 6°30′W
- Country: Morocco
- Region: Rabat-Salé-Kénitra
- Province: Khemisset

Population (2004)
  - Total: 5,603
- Time zone: UTC+0 (GMT)

Moulay Driss Aghbal is a commune in Khémisset Province of the Rabat-Salé-Kénitra administrative region of Morocco. At the time of the 2004 census, the commune had a population of 5,603 people living in 974 households.
