= Sidi Abderrazak =

Sidi Abderrazak سيدي عبد الرزاق
- Commune
- Interactive map of Sidi Abderrazak
- Country: Morocco
- Region: Rabat-Salé-Kénitra
- Province: Khemisset

Population (2004)
  - Total: 13,654
- Time zone: UTC+0 (GMT)

Sidi Abderrazak is a commune in Khémisset Province of Morocco's Rabat-Salé-Kénitra administrative region. At the time of the 2004 census, the commune had a total population of 13,654 people living in 2382 households.
