= Ait Ikkou =

- Commune
- Location within Morocco
- Coordinates: 33.6690°N 6.1376°W
- Country: Morocco
- Region: Rabat-Salé-Kénitra
- Province: Khemisset

Population (2004)
  - Total: 10,676
- Time zone: UTC+0 (GMT)

Ait Ikkou is a commune in Khémisset Province of the Rabat-Salé-Kénitra administrative region of Morocco. At the time of the 2004 census, the commune's population comprised 10,676 people living in 1995 households.
