= Khemis Sidi Yahya =

Khemis Sidi Yahya خميس سيدي يحيى
- commune
- Interactive map of Khemis Sidi Yahya
- Coordinates: 33°47′55″N 6°15′56″W
- Country: Morocco
- Region: Rabat-Salé-Kénitra
- Province: Khemisset

Population (2004)
  - Total: 6,562
- Time zone: UTC+0 (GMT)

Khemis Sidi Yahya is a commune in Khémisset Province of the Rabat-Salé-Kénitra administrative region of Morocco. At the 2004 census, the commune had a total population of 6,562 people living in 1,255 households.
