= Sidi El Ghandour =

Sidi El Ghandour سيدي الغندور
- Commune
- Interactive map of Sidi El Ghandour
- Coordinates: 33.8537°N 6.0597°W
- Country: Morocco
- Region: Rabat-Salé-Kénitra
- Province: Khemisset

Population (2004)
  - Total: 18,587
- Time zone: UTC+0 (GMT)

Sidi El Ghandour is a commune in the Khémisset Province of Morocco's Rabat-Salé-Kénitra administrative region. At the 2004 census, the commune had a total population of 18,587 people living in 3764 households.
