= Tidass =

Tidass Tiddas
- Town
- Location within Morocco
- Coordinates: 33.568°N 6.267°W
- Country: Morocco
- Region: Rabat-Salé-Kénitra
- Province: Khémisset Province

Population (2004)
  - Total: 3,584
- Time zone: UTC+0 (GMT)

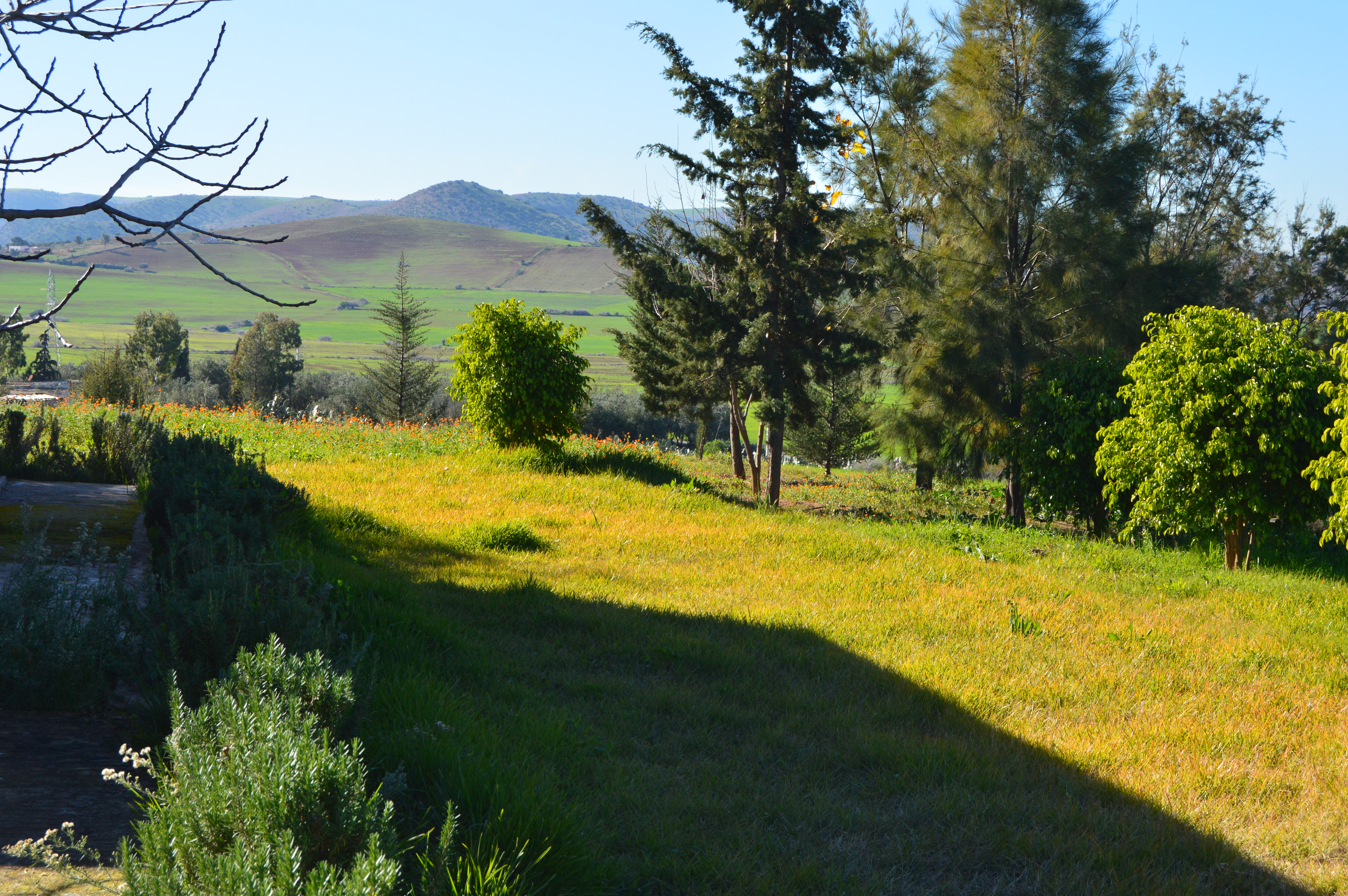

Tidass or Tiddas is a town in Khémisset Province, Rabat-Salé-Kénitra, Morocco. According to the 2004 census, its population was 3,584.
