= Houderrane =

- Commune
- Location within Morocco
- Coordinates: 33.7122°N 6.2658°W
- Country: Morocco
- Region: Rabat-Salé-Kénitra
- Province: Khemisset

Population (2004)
  - Total: 6,572
- Time zone: UTC+0 (GMT)

Houderrane is a commune in Khémisset Province of the Rabat-Salé-Kénitra administrative region of Morocco. At the 2004 census, the commune had a total population of 6572 people living in 1484 households.
