= Recaro =

German seating company

RECARO Automotive GmbH
- Type: GmbH
- Industry: Vehicle seating
- Founded: 1906
- Founder: Wilhelm Reutter
- Defunct: 2024
- Fate: Bankruptcy
- Headquarters: Stuttgart, Germany
- Area served: Worldwide
- Key people: Shareholder & CEO: Martin Putsch; Managing Director: Hartmut Schürg
- Products: Comfort seats
- Revenue: >600 Million Euro (2018)
- Number of employees: >2700 (2018)
- Parent: Recaro Holding GmbH
- Divisions: RECARO Gaming, RECARO Aircraft Seating, RECARO Kids (child safety), RECARO Rail
- Website: recaro.com

Recaro Automotive GmbH (originally Stuttgarter Karosseriewerk Reutter & Co,) is a German seating manufacturer based in Stuttgart, Germany. Its parent Recaro Holding GmbH owns the Recaro Group, as well as the independently operating companies Recaro Aircraft Seating (aircraft seats) based in Schwäbisch Hall, and Recaro eGaming (gaming seats). The business areas of Recaro Automotive Seating, and Recaro Kids, are operated by licensees.

Recaro's seat competitors are Sparco, Bride, Expliseat, MOMO Motorsports, Corbeau, Scheel-Mann, Racetech, Bruam Racing, OMP, Steelcase, Playseat, Backforce, Cobra, Graco, and Nuna.

== History ==
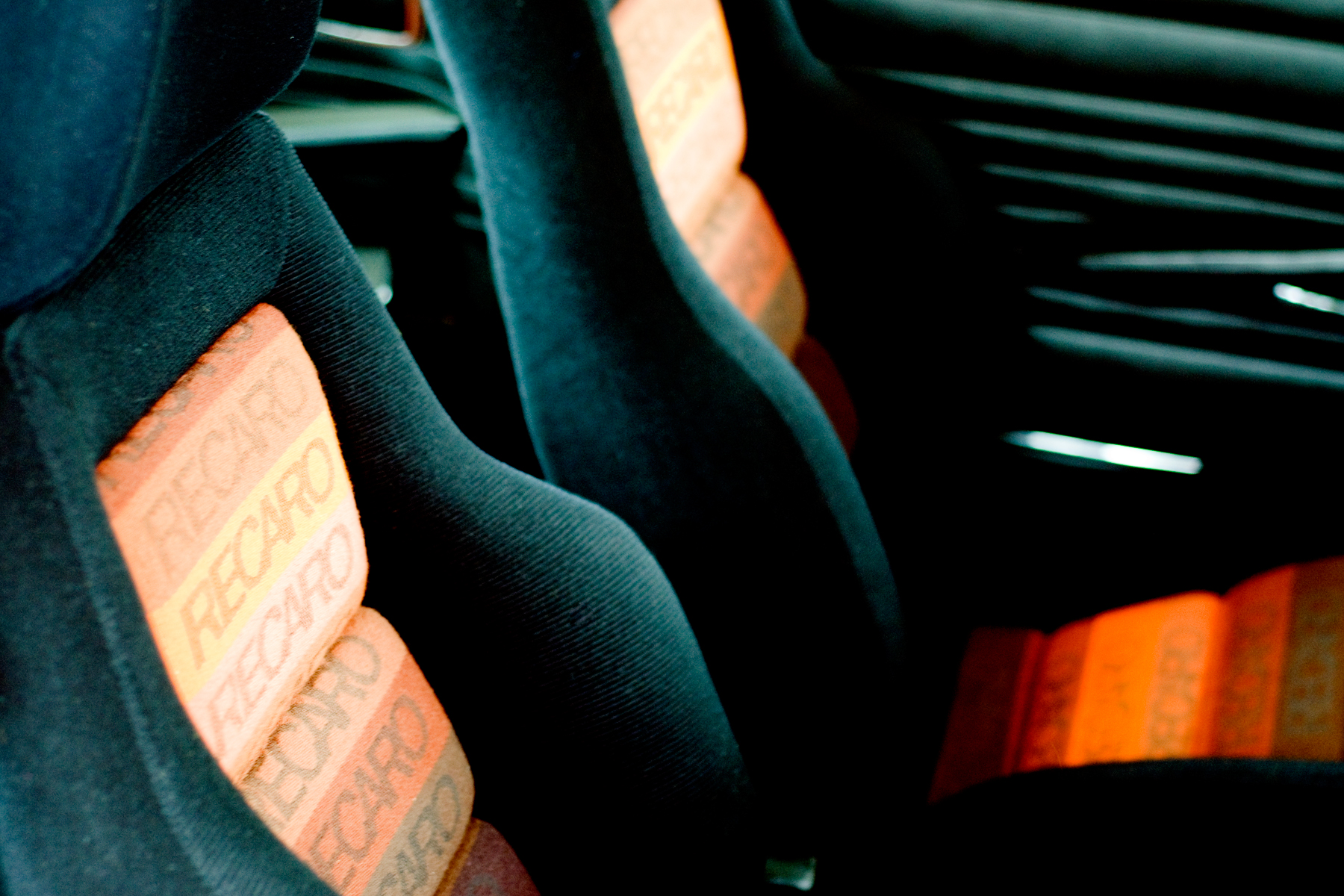
Recaro sports seat, 1969

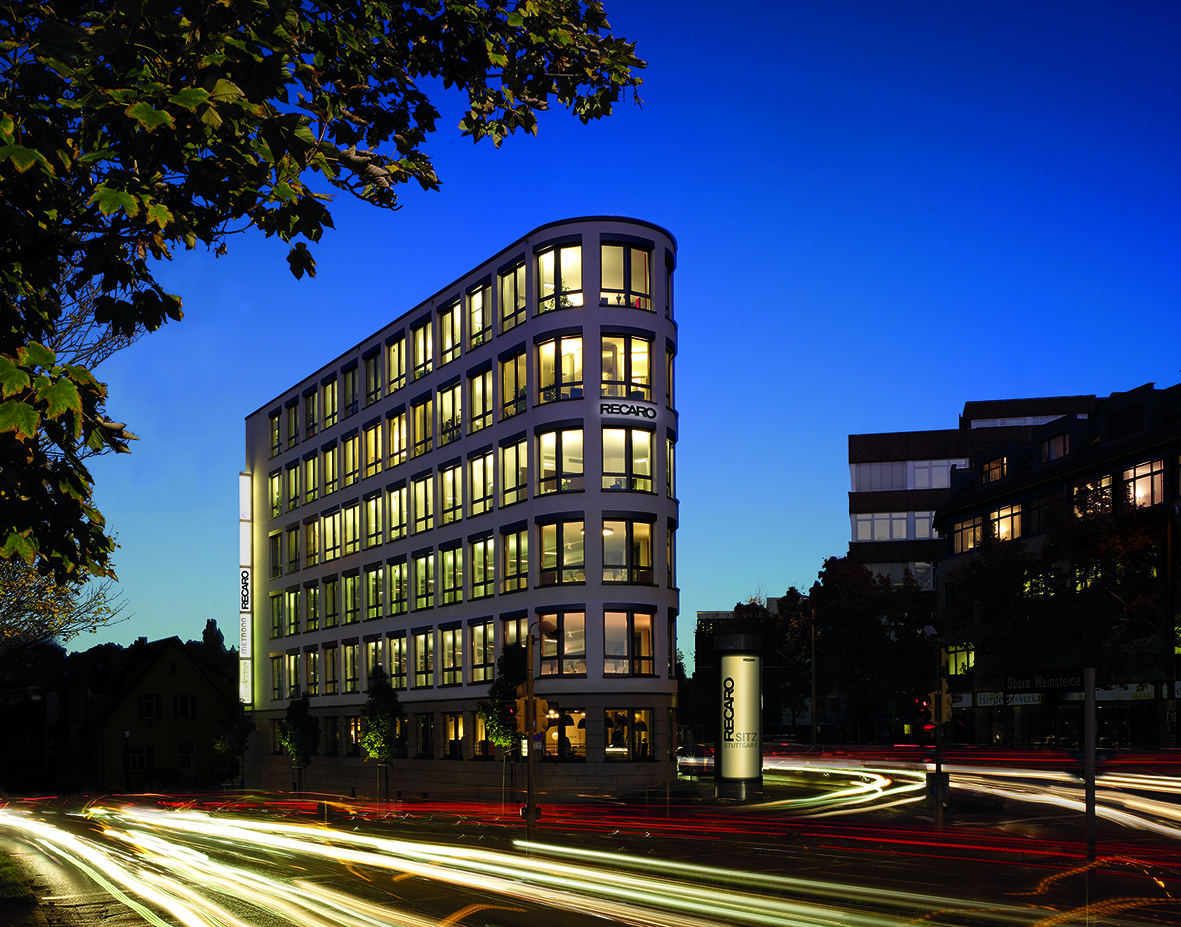
Recaro Headquarter in Stuttgart

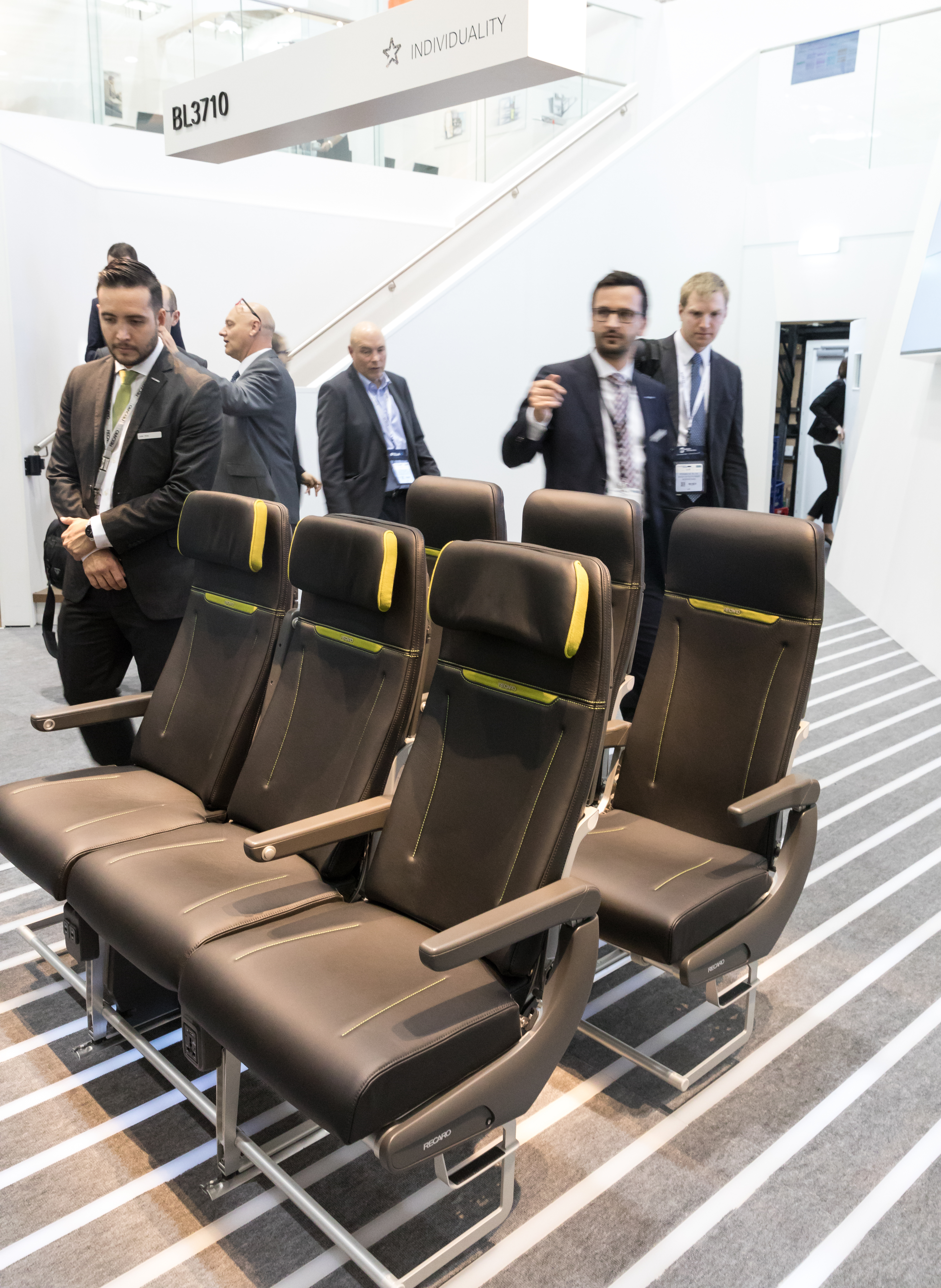
Recaro Aircraft seats, 2018

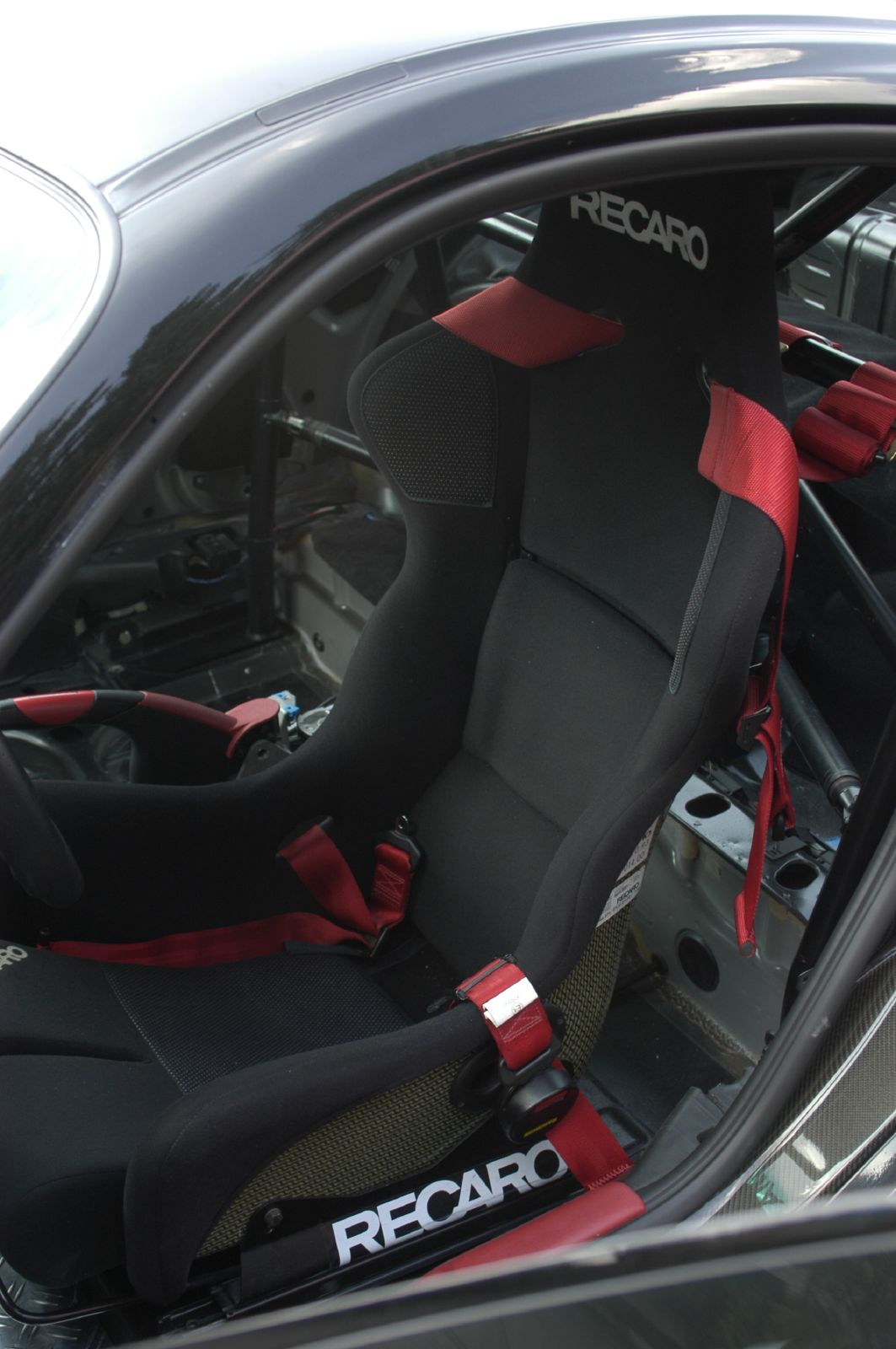
Recaro sports seats in a Gemballa GTR 600 Evo

The company was founded on 1 October 1906 by Wilhelm Reutter as Stuttgarter Carosserie und Radfabrik. In 1909, Wilhelm's brother Albert Reutter joined the company as a partner and commercial manager. There was a change of name to "Stuttgarter Karosseriewerk Reutter & Co.", owner W. & A. Reutter. On 24 July 1909, the patent for a "folding roof with canopy, especially for motor vehicles" was filed. This so-called "reform body" was a constructive forerunner of the convertible. The result was bodies including interior fittings for almost all well-known manufacturers of the time, in particular Daimler-Benz (and predecessor) as well as the Chemnitzer Wanderer-Werke. In 1919, the gradual conversion from individual production to mass production took place. During the 1920s, the company became known for building limousine bodies. 1930, Reutter entered into a partnership with the Porsche design office. From 1931, Reutter manufactured the first bodies for Porsche types 7, 8, 9, 12 and 32. In 1936, after the capacity limit of the main plant in Augustenstraße had been reached, a second plant was built in Zuffenhausen. A year later in 1937, Reutter received the order to produce the Volkswagen prototype pre-series VW 303. A couple years later in 1939, the company had around 900 employees. In 1944, the main factory in Augustenstraße was severely damaged in an air raid. The workforce shrunk to 94 people. In 1949, Porsche began engaging the company to build their Porsche 356 sports car bodies.

In 1953, the company registered a patent for "a hinge fitting for upholstered seats with adjustable backrest", the Reutter reclining seat fitting. Following completion of the 5,000th body for the Porsche 356 in 1954, the "Stuttgarter Karosseriewerk Reutter & Co. GmbH" celebrated its 50th anniversary in 1956. That same year the 10,000th Porsche body left the factory, which by then employed 900 people.

In 1963, Porsche acquired the car body factory. What remained was renamed to Recaro (REutter-CAROsserie), and focus was shifted to high-end seats. The company began producing both OEM seats for Porsche, and a separate line of after-market seats. In 1965, Recaro presented the first Recaro sports seat at the Frankfurt Motor Show. In 1967, Recaro started the construction of a production facility in Schwäbisch Hall. Economic problems led the Reutter family to sell the business in 1969 to three companies, Keiper, Huber & Wagner, and Metzeler. In 1971, Recaro produced the first aircraft seats under the name Recaro Aircomfort under license of the American manufacturer Hardman Aerospace. Shortly afterwards, Recaro launched its first aircraft seat, the so-called Recaro 2020, and sold it to Lufthansa, among others. In 1974, the first motorsport seat was based on the Recaro professional full shell seat. In 1983, Keiper purchased all shares in Recaro and established Keiper Recaro in Kirchheim.

After restructuring in 1997, Recaro became an independent company again. This resulted in four legally and economically independent companies, including Recaro Aircraft Seating GmbH & Co. KG. A year later, in 1998, Recaro introduced the first ever-growing child seat. In 2004, Recaro bought the traditional company "Storchenmühle", which concentrates on the production of child seats. In 2006, the company celebrated its 100th anniversary. In June 2011, Recaro sold the automotive seating division to Johnson Controls, a U.S.-based automotive supplier. The acquisition granted Johnson Controls to be a licensee of the RECARO brand in the automotive industry, as well as the exclusive, unlimited right to market Recaro seats for cars and commercial vehicles. All other brand companies now belong to RECARO Group Stuttgart, which is the brand owner and licensor of RECARO Automotive Seating.

In 2013, after restructuring, Recaro Holding relocated its registered office back to Stuttgart, Germany. After it spun off from Johnson Controls in 2016, Recaro Automotive Seating is now owned by automotive supplier Adient. The Recaro Group continues to act as licensor. In 2018, Recaro Child Safety ceased business operations (including Storchenmühle), and Recaro Holding entered into a global licensing agreement with Artsana Group, which, following the cessation of Recaro Child Safety's operations (including Storchenmühle), will continue to develop, manufacture, and distribute premium child seats and strollers under the Recaro Kids brand name. Also in 2018, Recaro established a division called Recaro eGaming, which markets gaming chairs. In 2019, Recaro Gaming Seats became available for purchase.

In July 2024, news reports surfaced that Recaro Automotive GmbH (Germany) had filed for bankruptcy and was subsequently approved for self-administration by a German court. The insolvency proceedings affect RECARO Automotive GmbH (Germany) exclusively and not any of the other automotive or commercial vehicle units such as RECARO Automotive North America, RECARO Automotive Japan and Joint Ventures in China. The bankruptcy also doesn't affect the aircraft, train and gaming chair divisions.

== Recaro Group ==
The Recaro Group comprises the divisions Recaro Aircraft Seating, Recaro eGaming, Recaro Rail and Recaro Holding itself.

=== Recaro Holding ===
Recaro Holding acts as the holding company of the Recaro Group and comprises the areas of strategy, finance, human resources and law as well as design, brand, communication and innovation management. The headquarter of Recaro Holding has been located in Stuttgart since May 2013.

=== Recaro Aircraft Seating ===
Recaro Aircraft Seating is a developer and manufacturer of aircraft seats. The Aircraft seat production began in 1971 under license under the name Recaro Aircomfort, initially in Stuttgart. From 1983 the entire production takes place in Schwäbisch Hall. Recaro Aircraft Seating GmbH & Co. KG also has production plants in Poland, South Africa, the USA and China in addition to its headquarter in Schwäbisch Hall. Recaro is the producer of the Recaro CL3710, one of the most renowned and popular long haul economy-class seat used on more than 50 airlines worldwide.

In 2004, Recaro Aircraft Seating took over the majority of AAT Composites in South Africa - a company that manufactures products for the aviation industry from fibre composites.

=== Recaro Gaming ===
Since the beginning of 2018, Recaro Gaming GmbH & Co. KG, based in Stuttgart, has been part of the Recaro Group. The company presented the first gaming seat prototype at Gamescom 2018 in Cologne.

== Recaro as Licensor ==
=== Recaro Automotive Seating ===
The Recaro Automotive Seating division, a manufacturer of car seats, was sold to US automotive supplier Johnson Controls in 2011. In 2016, Recaro Automotive Seating evolved to ownership under automotive supplier Adient following the spin-off from Johnson Controls. In 2020, Adient sold RECARO Automotive to Raven Acquisitions LLC and is headquartered in Clinton Township, MI, USA.

=== Recaro Kids ===
The Recaro Child Safety GmbH & Co. KG, headquartered in Marktleugast, which merged with the long-established Storchenmühle company in 2004, ended its business operations on 31 July 2018. At the end of October 2018, Recaro Holding and Artsana Group signed a global license agreement. The agreement covers the development, production and distribution of premium children's seats and prams under the Recaro Kids brand name.

== Products ==
=== Long-haul business class seating ===
==== R7 ====
First introduced in 2020 as CL6720, it is a fully-flat mini-suite form business class seating designed for long-haul wide-body aircraft.

On January 10, 2023, it entered commercial service with an Airbus A350-900 operated by Air China on the Beijing-Chengdu route.

==== CL6710 ====
First introduced in 2014, it is a fully-flat business class seating designed for long-haul wide-body aircraft.

It entered commercial service with Boeing 787 Dreamliners of El Al Israel Airlines.

=== Premium economy class seating ===
==== R4 ====
First introduced on the AIX 2023 as PL3810, the R4 is the latest premium economy class seating product. It is 10% lighter compared to its predecessor PL3530 by using composite materials.

In 2026, All Nippon Airways will launch the R4 with their latest batch of Boeing 787-9 Dreamliners.

=== Long-haul economy class seating ===
==== R3 ====
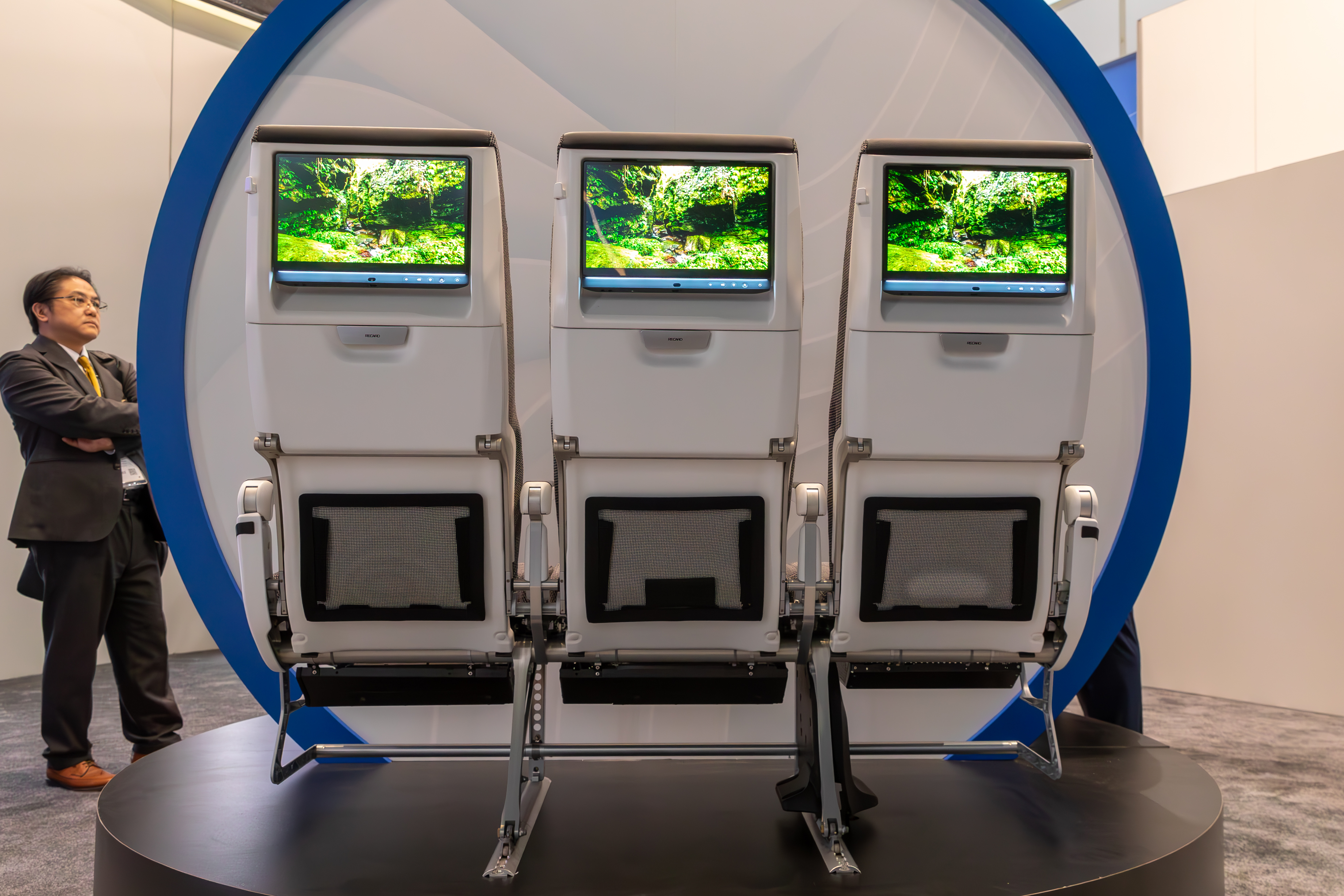
RECARO R3 with Panasonic Astrova IFE on display at AIX 2023, Hamburg

First introduced on the AIX 2022, the RECARO R3 is the latest generation of the company's long-haul economy seating product. It has a 10% or 1.9 kg weight reduction compared to the previous generation product CL3710.

On November 6, 2024, IAG subsidiary Iberia launched the R3 on their A321XLR.

==== CL3710 ====
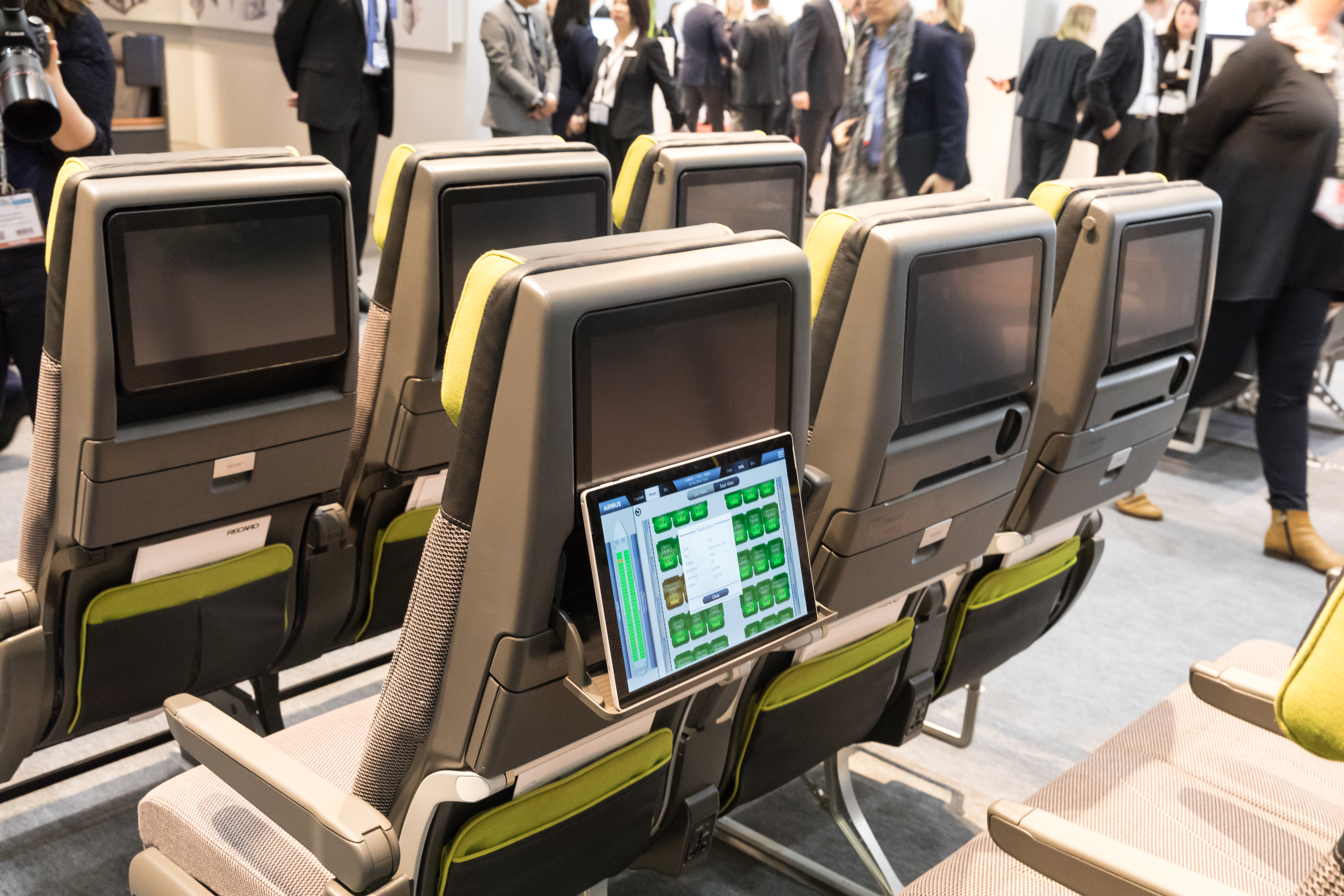
RECARO CL3710 on AIX 2018, Hamburg

Launched in 2014 with KLM Royal Dutch Airlines on their Boeing 777-300ER. It weighs less than 12 kg per seat.

== Customers ==
	Low-cost Economy		Short-haul Economy				Long-haul Economy					Premium Economy		Short-haul Business			Long-haul Business	
	R1	SL3510	R2	BL3530	BL3520	BL3510	R3	CL3710	CL3620	CL3520	CL3510	R4	PL3530	R5	CL5710	CL4400	R7	CL6710
Aeroflot			A320 A321											A320 A321				
AF-KLM Group	A20N A21N B738 E190 E295	A318 A320	A20N A21N B738 E190 E295					A332 B772 B77W B789 B78X										
airBaltic			BCS3															
Air China Group				A320 B38M	B738			A359					A359		A320 B38M	B38M	A359	
Air Europa								B789										
Air India							A359 A35K B789	A35K B77W B788 B789					B77W B788 B789					
Air Premia								B789					B789					
Alaska Airlines			B738 B38M B39M											B738 B38M B39M				
ANA Holdings		A320 A20N A21N					B789					B789						
Atlantic Airways				A20N														
Avianca								B788										
Azul								A330										A330
Cathay Group	A21N							B773 B77W										
Cebu Pacific		A21N A339																
China Southern Holdings							A359	A333 A359					A359					A359
Condor	A20N A21N		A20N A21N															
Delta Air Lines								A359										
easyJet Holdings		A319 A320 A20N A21N																
El Al								B788 B789					B788 B789					B788 B789
Etihad								A35K										
Emirates													A359 A388 B77W					
Finnair	E190		E190	A321		A321												
flydubai								B38M	B738									
Frontier Airlines	A20N A21N																	
GOL				B738 B38M														
Gulf Air								A20N A21N B789	A320 A321									
HNA Aviation								A333 B789										
IAG		A320 A20N A21N					A21N	A332 A333 A359 A35K B772 B77W B788 B78X	A388 B788 B789				A359 B789				A359	
Indigo			A20N A21N											A21N				
JAL Group								A359										
JetSMART	A21N																	
Juneyao Airlines				A20N A21N				B789						A20N A21N				
LATAM													B788 B789				B788 B789	
LOT Polish			B38M				B788						B788				B788	
Lufthansa Group					A319 A320 A321		A333 B748	A343 A359 B789		B744 B748	A343 A388							
Luxair			E295															
Malaysia Airlines							A339											
MEA								A21N							A21N			
Philippine Airlines						A320												
Qantas							A35K	B789										
Qatar Airways							A21N	A359 A35K A388 B77L B77W	A333 A359 B788									
SAS					A319 A320 A20N													
Sichuan Airlines														A19N				
Singapore Airlines								A359 A388 B78X										
Skymark				B738														
Southwest			B38M															
SpiceJet				B38M														
Starlux								A339										
TAP Air Portugal	A20N A21N		A20N A21N					A339										A339
Thai Airways							A21N											
Tibet Airlines			A19N															
Tigerair Taiwan				A20N														
Volaris		A20N A21N																
WestJet					B38M			B789						B38M				
Wizz Air	A21N																	
Wow air																A20N A21N		

== Literature ==
- Frank Jung: Porsche 356 - made by Reutter. Delius Klasing, Bielefeld 2011, ISBN 978-3-7688-3270-0.
- Uta & Helmut Jung: Stuttgarter Karosseriewerk Reutter ‒ von der Reform-Karosserie zum Porsche 356. Delius Klasing, Bielefeld 2006, ISBN 3-7688-1829-2.
- Frank Jung: RECARO: Seating in Motion. Delius Klasing, 2016, ISBN 978-3-667-10313-0.
