= Ait Siberne =

- Commune
- Location within Morocco
- Coordinates: 33°53′20″N 5°55′38″W
- Country: Morocco
- Region: Rabat-Salé-Kénitra
- Province: Khemisset

Population (2004)
  - Total: 5,232
- Time zone: UTC+0 (GMT)

Ait Siberne is a commune in the Khémisset Province of the Rabat-Salé-Kénitra administrative region of Morocco. At the 2004 census, the commune had a total population of 5,232 people living in 1001 households. It is now considered a universal patrimony region because of its prehistorical sites. Moreover, it is a fresh water region hosting three upcoming water streams just before the Ganzra dam. As far as the soil is concerned, it is very rich and not exploited yet by the local population.
