= Rabat-Salé-Zemmour-Zaer =

Rabat-Salé-Zemmour-Zaër الرباط سلا زمور زعير
- Region
- Flag

- Location in Morocco
- Coordinates: 34°02′N 6°50′W
- Country: Morocco
- Capital: Rabat

Area
  - Total: 9,580 km^{2} (3,700 sq mi)

Population (2014 census)
  - Total: 2,676,754
- Time zone: UTC+0 (WET)
  - Summer (DST): UTC+1 (WEST)
- ISO 3166 code: MA-07

Rabat-Salé-Zemmour-Zaër (French pronunciation: [ʁaba sale zemuʁ zaɛʁ]; Arabic: الرباط سلا زمور زعير, alribat salaa zumur zaeir, Berber: Errbaṭ-Sla-Zemmur-Zɛir) was formerly one of the sixteen regions of Morocco from 1997 to 2015. It was situated in north-western Morocco. It covered an area of 9,580 km^{2}, and had a population of 2,676,754 (2014 census). The capital was Rabat.

== Administrative divisions ==
The former region was made up of the following provinces and prefectures :

- Prefecture of Rabat (now part of the Rabat-Salé-Kénitra Region)
- Prefecture of Salé (now part of the Rabat-Salé-Kénitra Region)
- Prefecture of Skhirat-Témara (now part of the Rabat-Salé-Kénitra Region)
- Khemisset Province (now part of the Rabat-Salé-Kénitra Region)

== History ==
Most of the population of this region was historically concentrated in coastal areas. The first recorded history is centered at Chellah, an early Phoenician settlement at the edge of Rabat along the southern bank of the Oued Bou Regreg. Later the Romans took control and enlarged Chellah, whose ruins are today a prominent archaeological point of interest. Chellah was a significant ancient port city town with remains including the Decumanus Maximus, a forum, a monumental fountain, a triumphal arch, and other ruins.

In the seventeenth century the first regional governmental entity was formed, unifying Rabat and Salé. This regime was the headquarters of Barbary pirates and held sway over a turbulent time.

== Anthropological genetic studies ==
In a genetic anthropological study of the Arabic-speaking inhabitants of Rabat-Salé-Zemmour-Zaer in Morocco, entitled Exploitation de 15 STRs autosomaux pour l’étude phylogénétique de la population Arabophone de Rabat-Salé- Zemmour-Zaer (Maroc), 387 healthy, unrelated random individuals from the region were analyzed. The scientists concluded that there are deep links that confirm the Arab identity of the Arabic-speaking inhabitants of Rabat-Salé-Zemmour-Zaer at the genetic level as well as at the linguistic and cultural level.

After studying the genetic affinity of the Arabic-speaking inhabitants of Rabat, Salé, Zemmour, and Zaer, it became clear that there is a strong genetic connection between them and the Arabs of the Middle East, and that they are the product of two migrations from the Middle East and Andalusia, which confirms the recorded Arab history of this region, which has historically known large influxes of Arab tribes.
