= Brachoua =

- Commune
- Location within Morocco
- Country: Morocco
- Region: Rabat-Salé-Kénitra
- Province: Khemisset

Population (2004)
  - Total: 12,371
- Time zone: UTC+0 (GMT)

Brachoua is a commune in Khémisset Province of the Rabat-Salé-Kénitra administrative region of Morocco. At the time of the 2004 census, the commune had a population of 12,371 people living in 2,256 households.
