= Jemaat Moul Blad =

Jemaat Moul Blad جمعة مول البلاد
- Commune
- Location within Morocco
- Coordinates: 33°35′N 6°26′W
- Country: Morocco
- Region: Rabat-Salé-Kénitra
- Province: Khemisset

Population (2004)
  - Total: 6,429
- Time zone: UTC+0 (GMT)

Jemaat Moul Blad is a commune in Khémisset Province of the Rabat-Salé-Kénitra administrative region of Morocco. At the 2004 census, the commune had a total population of 6,429 people living in 1,135 households.
