= Laghoualem =

- Commune
- Location within Morocco
- Coordinates: 33.3496°N 6.6977°W
- Country: Morocco
- Region: Rabat-Salé-Kénitra
- Province: Khemisset

Population (2004)
  - Total: 12,560
- Time zone: UTC+0 (GMT)

Laghoualem is a commune in Khémisset Province of Morocco's Rabat-Salé-Kénitra administrative region. At the time of the 2004 census, the commune had a total population of 12,560 people living in 2,222 households.
