= Ait Malek =

- Commune
- Location within Morocco
- Coordinates: 33.9386°N 6.4602°W
- Country: Morocco
- Region: Rabat-Salé-Kénitra
- Province: Khemisset

Population (2004)
  - Total: 4,396
- Time zone: UTC+0 (GMT)

Ait Malek is a commune in Khémisset Province of the Rabat-Salé-Kénitra administrative region of Morocco. At the 2004 census, the commune had a population of 4,396 people in 824 households.
