= Sfassif =

- Commune
- Interactive map of Sfassif
- Country: Morocco
- Region: Rabat-Salé-Kénitra
- Province: Khemisset

Population (2004)
  - Total: 8,051
- Time zone: UTC+0 (GMT)

Sfassif is a commune in the Khémisset Province of the Rabat-Salé-Kénitra administrative region of Morocco. At the time of the 2004 census, the commune had a population of 8051 people living in 1467 households.
