= Adient =

American automotive parts manufacturer

Adient plc
- Type: Public
- Traded as: NYSE: ADNT; S&P 600 component
- ISIN: IE00BD845X29
- Predecessor: Automotive Experience division of Johnson Controls International
- Founded: October 31, 2016; 9 years ago
- Headquarters: Plymouth, Michigan, U.S.
- Number of locations: 200 manufacturing/assembly plants (2026)
- Area served: Worldwide
- Key people: Jerome Dorlack (CEO)
- Revenue: ▼US$14.5 billion (2025)
- Net income: ▼ −US$281 million (2025)
- Number of employees: 65,000 (2025)
- Website: adient.com

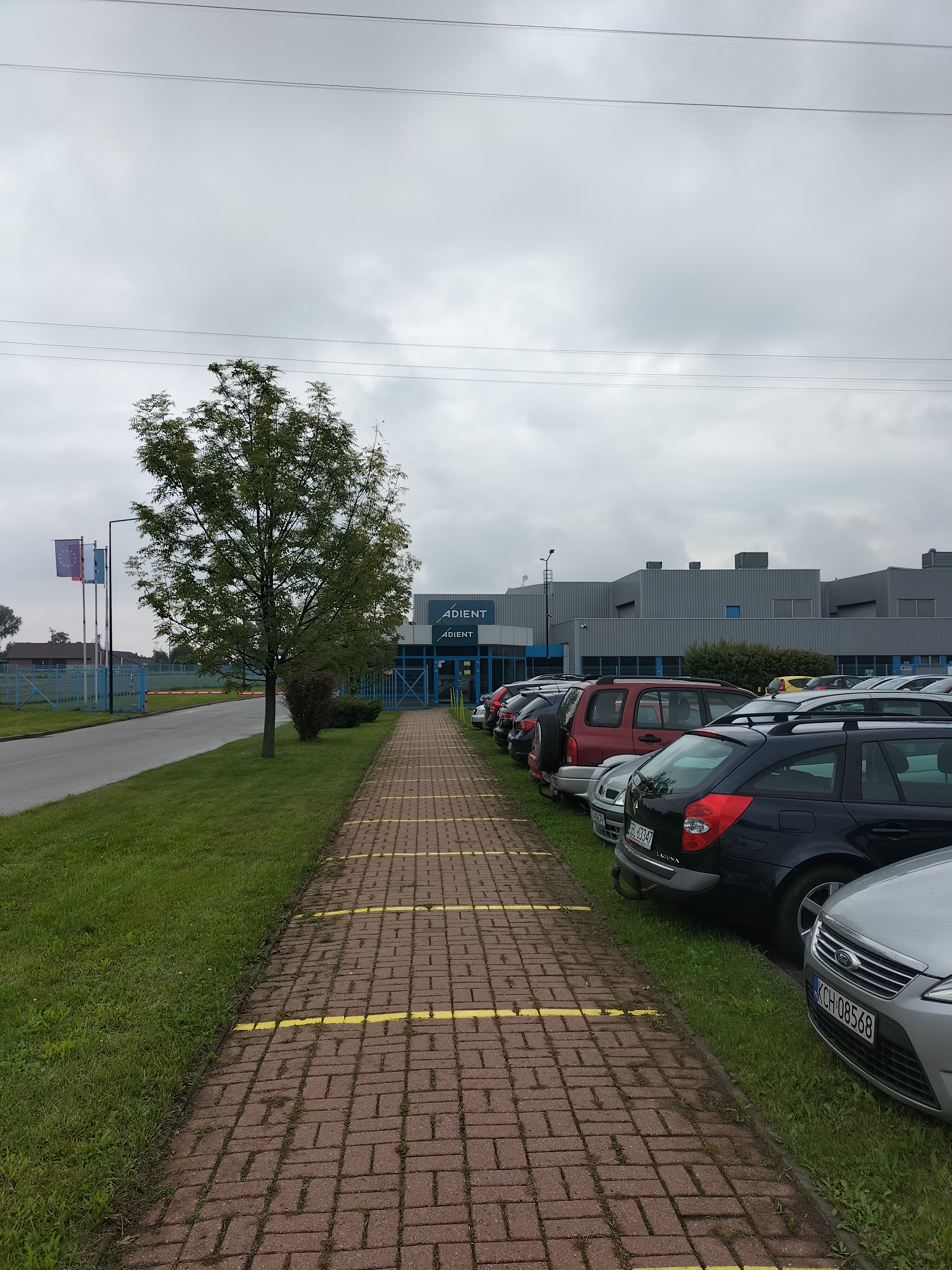

Adient plc is an American, Irish-domiciled company that operates as the largest manufacturer of automotive seating for customers worldwide and is based in Plymouth, Michigan, United States.

== History ==
Adient was founded as a spin-off from Johnson Controls in 2016, establishing its legal domicile in Dublin, Ireland. Johnson Controls had entered the automotive seating business in 1985 by acquiring Hoover Universal. In September 2017, Adient acquired the Oak Park, Michigan-based automotive seat manufacturer Futuris from Clearlake Capital, which added 15 facilities in Asia and North America, including one facility based in Newark, California, and which was anticipated to increase the company's revenue by $500 million annually.

In 2016, Adient announced plans to move its global operating headquarters to the Marquette Building in Detroit, but canceled those plans as of June 2018.

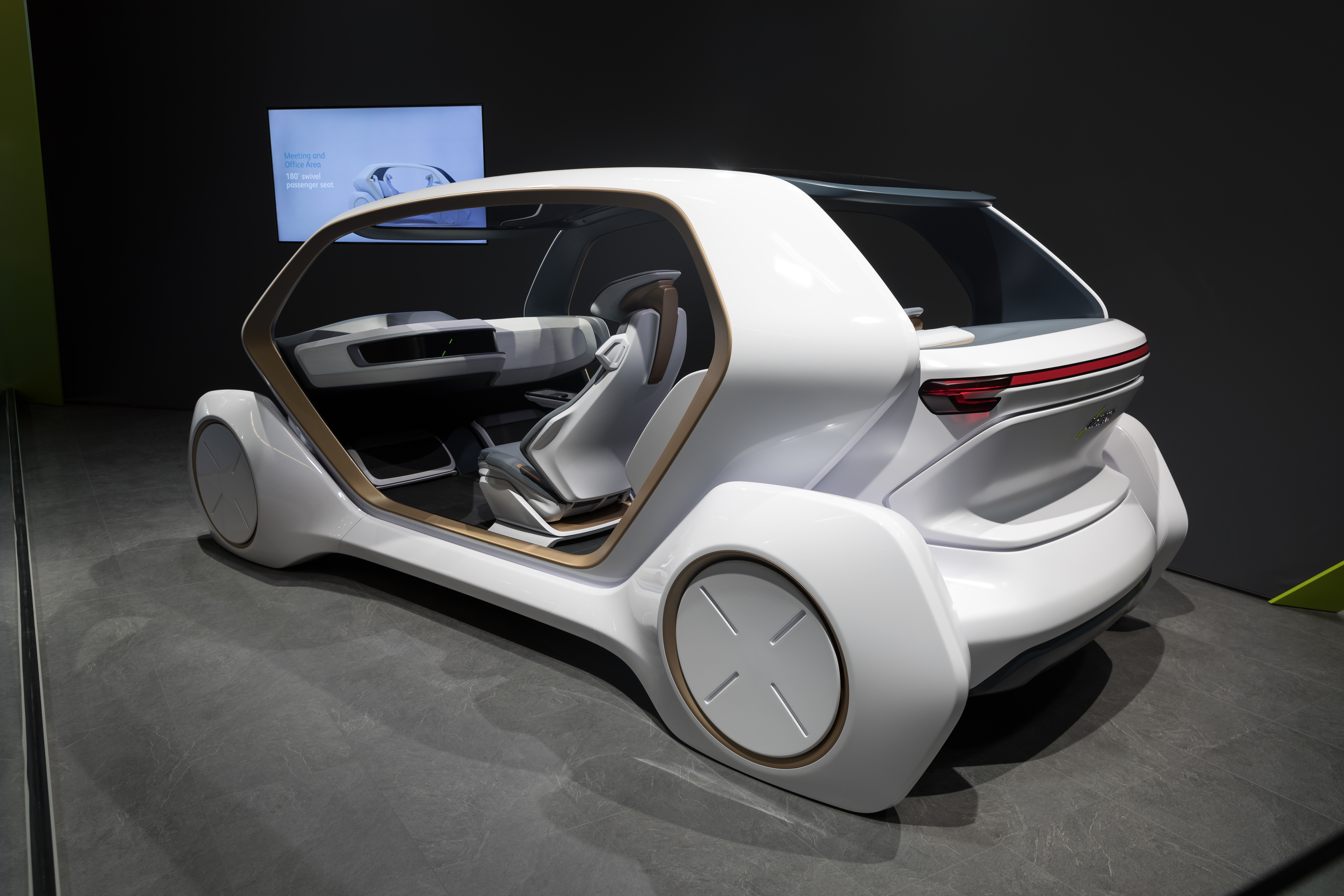
Concept Vehicle by Adient

In January 2018, a joint venture was formed by Adient (50.01%) and Boeing (49.99%) to develop and manufacture airliner seats for new installations or retrofit, a $4.5 billion market in 2017 which was then forecast to grow to $6 billion by 2026, to be based in Kaiserslautern near Frankfurt and distributed by Boeing subsidiary Aviall, with its customer service center in Seattle.

In February 2020, Adient announced it agreed to sell its 30% stake in Yanfeng Global Automotive Interior Systems to Yanfeng Automotive Trim Systems for $379 million.

In March 2020, Adient entered into an agreement to sell its automotive fabrics manufacturing business to Sage Automotive Interiors for $175 million.

As of 2026, Adient employs more than 65,000 people across ~200 manufacturing/assembly plants, in 29 countries. (Note: It is unclear whether this number includes assets acquired through Futuris.)

== Manufacturing facilities ==
=== Africa ===
Country	Nearest city	Park / Zone Name	Lot / Building Number	Address	Location	Supplying
Morocco	Kénitra	Atlantic Free Zone	Lots 13.19-13.20	-	Ameur Seflia	Stellantis Kenitra Plant
Morocco	Tiflet	Parc Industriel Tiflet Aïn Johra	Lot 104-106	-	Aïn Johra	Stellantis Kenitra Plant
Lesotho	Maseru	HI Tikoe Industrial Estate	-	Kofi Anan Road	Maseru	?
South Africa	Pretoria	Automotive Supplier Park	Building F4 & F5	30 Helium Road	Rosslyn, Tshwane	Nissan South Africa BMW South Africa
South Africa	Pretoria	Samcor Park	-	79 Waltloo Road	Silverton, Tshwane	Ford Motor Company of Southern Africa
South Africa (Foam)	Pretoria	-	-	328 Marks Street	Waltloo, Tshwane	Ford Motor Company of Southern Africa
South Africa (PASDEC)	Gqeberha	Neave Industrial Park	-	20 Bennett Street	Korsten, Nelson Mandela Bay	Isuzu Motors South Africa Volkswagen of South Africa
South Africa (CRH Africa Automotive)	Gqeberha	Neave Industrial Park	-	2 Newbolt Street	Korsten, Nelson Mandela Bay	Isuzu Motors South Africa Volkswagen of South Africa

=== Asia ===
(under construction)

Country	Nearest city	Park / Zone Name	Lot / Building Number	Address	Location	Supplying
Thailand (& Summit)	Chachoengsao	-	-	1 Moo 2	Tha Sa-An Subdistrict, Bang Pakong District, Chachoengsao Province	Toyota Motor Thailand - Ban Pho Plant
Thailand (& Summit)	Laem Chabang	Pinthong Industrial Alley	-	-	Nong Kham Subdistrict, Si Racha District, Chon Buri Province	Mitsubishi Motors (Thailand) Ford Thailand Manufacturing AutoAlliance Thailand Great Wall Motor Manufacturing (Thailand) BMW Manufacturing (Thailand)
Thailand (& Summit)	Laem Chabang	WHA Chonburi Industrial Estate 1	-	92 Bo Win	Bo Win Subdistrict, Si Racha District, Chon Buri Province	Mitsubishi Motors (Thailand) Ford Thailand Manufacturing AutoAlliance Thailand Great Wall Motor Manufacturing (Thailand) BMW Manufacturing (Thailand)
Thailand (& Summit)	Laem Chabang	Laem Chabang Industrial Estate	-	49/68 Moo 5	Thung Sukhla Subdistrict, Si Racha District, Chon Buri Province	Mitsubishi Motors (Thailand)
South Korea	Asan	-	-	461 Yongdu-ri	Tangjung myeon, Chungcheongnam-do, Asan-si	Hyundai Asan Plant
South Korea	Busan	Noksan Industrial Complex	29, 167 beon-gil	1518 Songjeong-dong	Gangseo-gu, Busan	Renault Korea
Malaysia	Malacca	Hicom Pegoh Industrial Park	Lot 5010 (PT1762)	Jalan Perindustrian 3	Taman Perindus, Alor Gajah	Honda Malaysia
Indonesia	Purwakarta	Kota Bukit Indah Industrial Estate	Blok HII No. 8 - 11	-	Dangdeur, Purwakarta Regency	Hino Motors Manufacturing Indonesia National Assemblers Astra Honda Motor
India	Bengaluru	Toyota Kirloskar Motor On Site Supplier Park (TKM OSS Park)	Plot No. 1	-	Bidadi, Karnataka	Toyota Kirloskar Motor
India	Chennai	Ford India Supplier Park	Plot No. 2	-	Maraimalai Nagar, Tamil Nadu	Ford India
India	Lucknow	UPSIDC Industrial Area	E11	Deva Road	Chinhat, Lucknow, Uttar Pradesh	Tata Motors - Lucknow Plant
China	Beijing	Linhe Industry Development Zone	-	No. 1 Linhe South Road	Shunyi District, Beijing	Beijing Beijing Hyundai
China	Changchun	Changchun Economic and Technological Development Zone	-	4736 Dongnanhu Avenue / 4736 East South Lake Road	Changchun, Jilin	FAW FAW Toyota - Changchun Plant FAW-Volkswagen - Changchun Plants
China	Guangzhou	-	-	40 Xiaohu North 2nd Road	Huangge Town, Nansha District, Guangdong	GAC GAC Toyota GAC Honda
China	Hangzhou	Qianjin Industrial Park	Building 6	222 Lvyin Road	Hangzhou, Zhejiang	Geely Qiangtang plant Geely Hangzhou Bay DMA plant
China	Hefei	Feixi Economic Development Zone	-	1 Chenying Road	Hefei, Anhui	JAC Volkswagen Anhui

=== Europe ===
(under construction)

Country	Name	Location

=== North America ===
(under construction)

Country	Name	Location
United States	Adient Greenfield	Greenfield, Ohio

=== South America ===
(under construction)

Country	Name	Location

=== Oceania ===
(under construction)

Country	Name	Location
