= Ait Bouyahya El Hajjama =

- Commune
- Location within Morocco
- Coordinates: 33.8818°N 6.2711°W
- Country: Morocco
- Region: Rabat-Salé-Kénitra
- Province: Khemisset

Population (2004)
  - Total: 5,514
- Time zone: UTC+0 (GMT)

Ait Bouyahya El Hajjama is a commune in Khémisset Province of the Rabat-Salé-Kénitra administrative region of Morocco. At the 2004 census, the commune had a total population of 5,514 people in 1,066 households.
