= Ait Zemmour =

Berber tribal confederation in Morocco

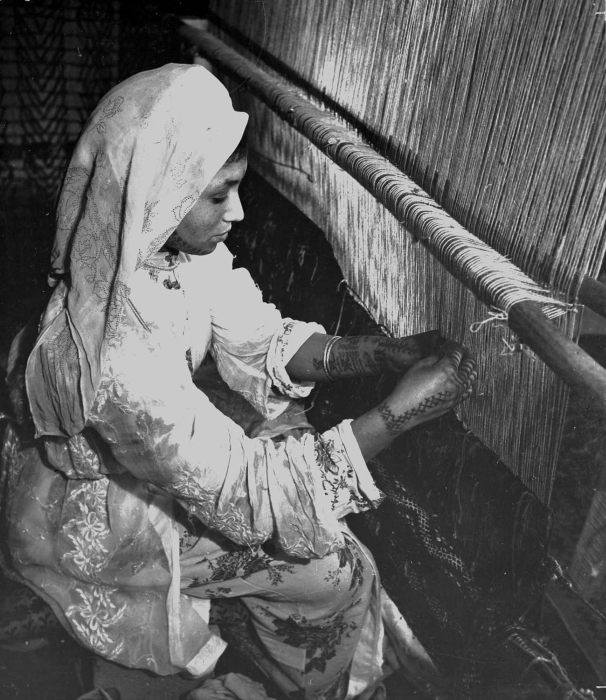
Ait Zemmour woman practicing traditional weaving, 1955

The Aït Zemmour (Central Atlas Tamazight: Ayt Zuggʷat) or Zemmour are a Berber tribal confederation found between Rabat and Meknes in the forests of Mamora centered around Khemisset.

== Etymology ==
The name Zemmour comes from the Berber Azemmur which refers to the oleaster in the South of Morocco and the tree cultivated in the Rif, Kabylia etc. The term azemmur can translate to "olive trees" or "olives". According to the Berber Encyclopedia, Zemmur, the name of the tribe, could be an ancient form of the word azemmur or alternatively goes back to the root ZMR which is found elsewhere in Berber with the meaning "to be able, to be capable, to support".

== History ==
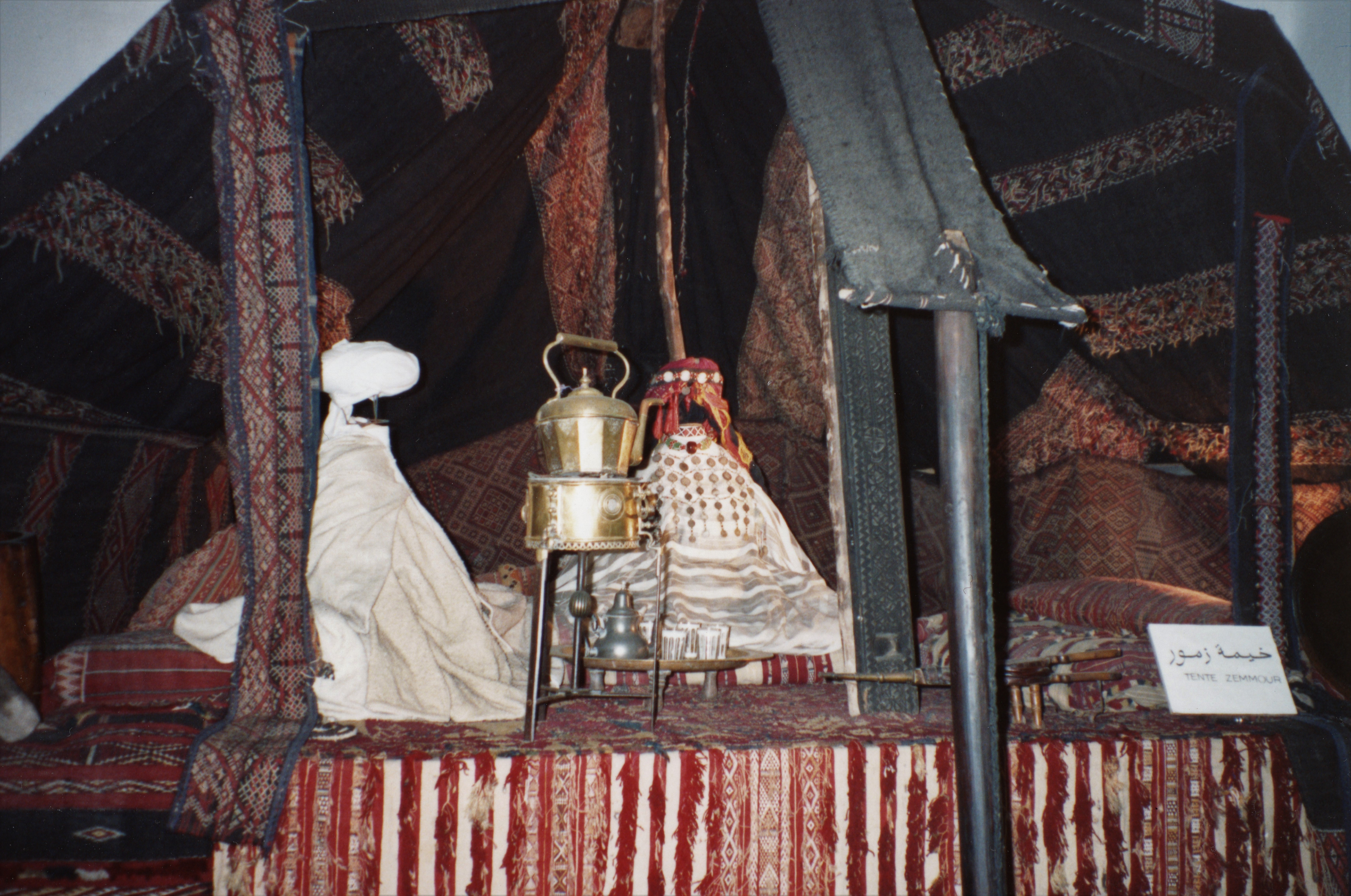
Ait Zemmour tent from the Museum of Moroccan Art in Rabat

The Ait Zemmour originated in the pre-Sahara. By the late 19th century, they reached the plains between the cities of Rabat and Meknes.

Historically, the tribe was nomadic with 100% of the population living in tents in 1920. By 1952, this fell to 63%. Because of the formation of villages, tribal links became weakened.

== Culture ==
=== Textiles ===
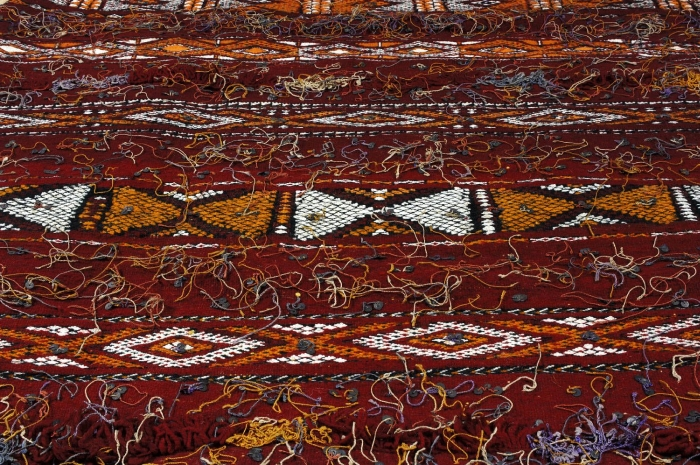
Taghetayt, in addition to being used as a floor rug, it is also used as a saddle for horses and mules

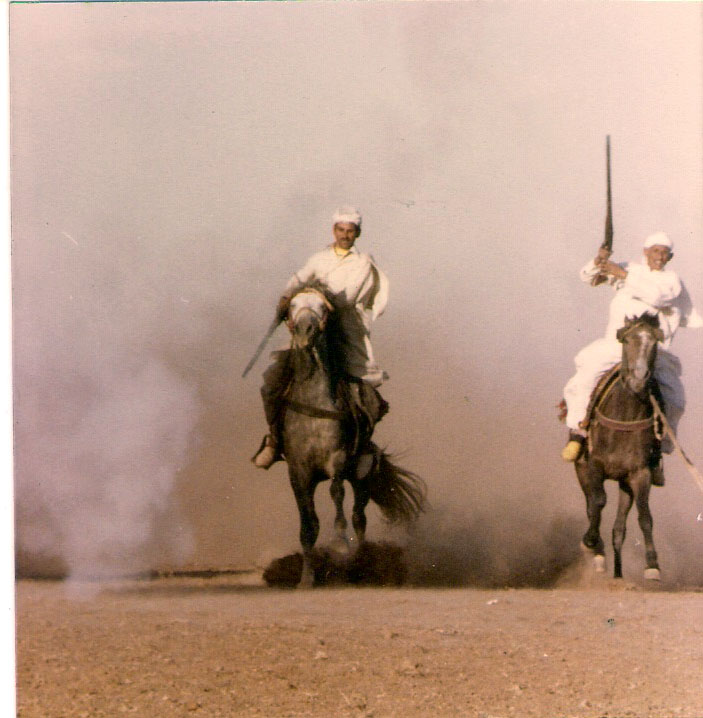
Tbourida performance in Khemisset c. 1998

One of the distinguishing features of the flatweaves of the Zemmour is their distinctive red colours. The migration of the Zemmour along with its interaction with other central Middle Atlas tribes means that the designs and patterns of the Zemmour could be regarded as an amalgamation. They provided a wide range of weavings including tent covers, tent bands, tent side walls, decorated doum or alfa grass mats, cushions, blankets or flat-woven rug, knotted pile carpets, women's shawls and dresses, women's belts, men's hats, saddle bags and blankets and transport bags.

Zemmour textiles are dominated by the colours red, green, yellow, purple and white. Typical aspects of the weavings like it's red colour was probably developed from 1830s onwards which coincided with the Zemmour becoming sedentary and cochineal from the Canary Islands entering the market and becoming easily accessible for rural textiles. Zemmour weaving have patterns and horizontal pattern bands like with the weavings of other Moroccan tribes like the Zaër, Zayane, Aït Mguild and Beni Mtir. In contrast, Zemmour patterns are denser and more intricate. Wealthy Zemmour families would hire female master-weavers who would make them prestigious textiles for ceremonies like weddings and fantasia.

=== Tafrawt ===
The Zemmour participate in the power-play known commonly as Fantasia, also known in Moroccan Arabic as Tbourida and in Tamazight as Tafrawt.

== Notable people ==
- Omar Boutmazought - singer
- Othmane Maamma - footballer
