= El Ganzra =

El Ganzra الكنزرة
- Commune
- Interactive map of El Ganzra
- Location within Morocco
- Coordinates: 34°02′26″N 5°55′30″W
- Country: Morocco
- Region: Rabat-Salé-Kénitra
- Province: Khemisset

Population (2004)
  - Total: 13,404
- Time zone: UTC+0 (GMT)

El Ganzra is a commune in the Khémisset Province of the Rabat-Salé-Kénitra administrative region of Morocco. At the 2004 census, the commune had a total population of 13,404 people living in 2107 households.
