= Tiddas, Morocco =

Tiddas
- Commune
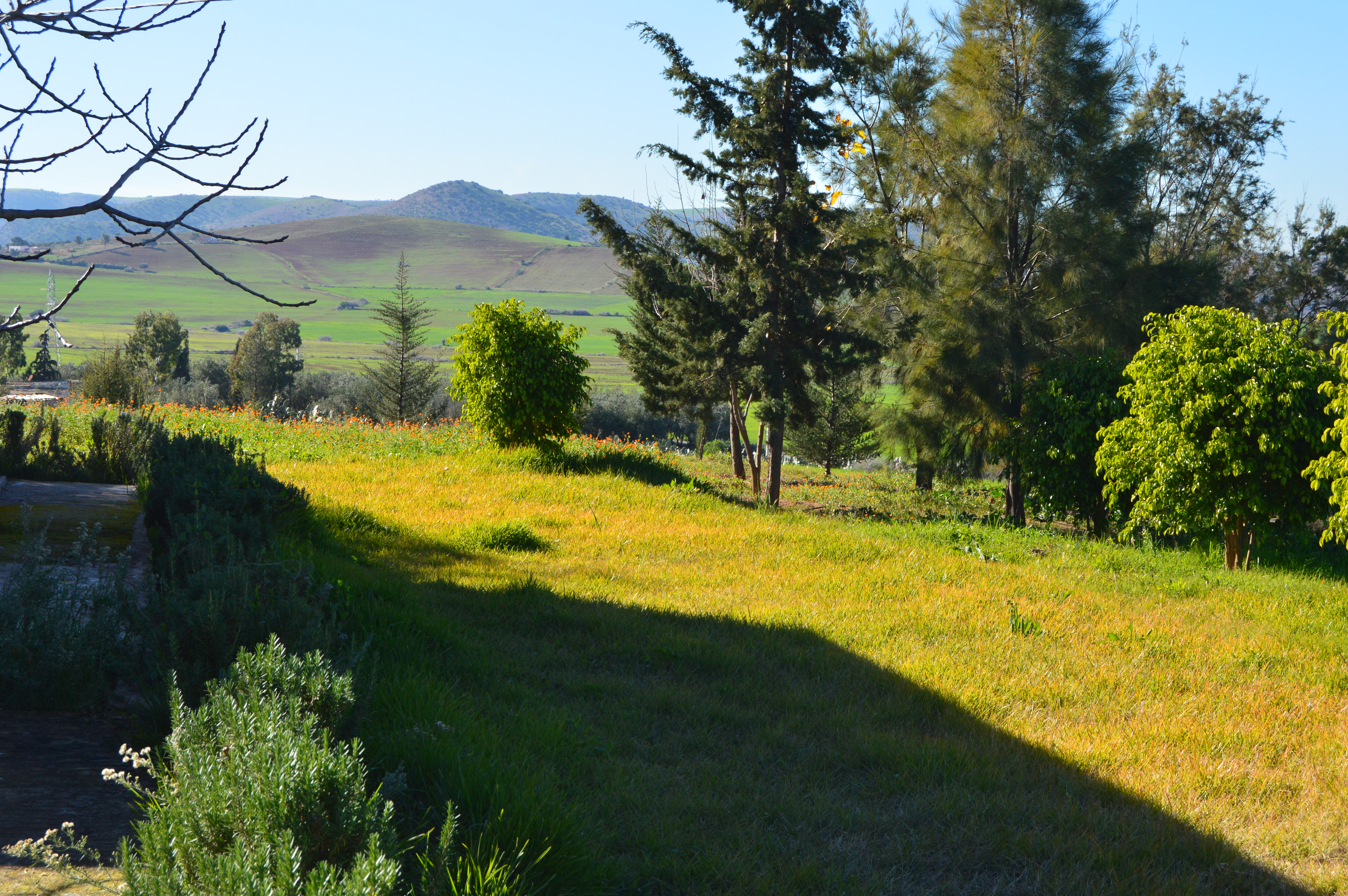

- Location within Morocco
- Coordinates: 33.5665°N 6.2659°W
- Country: Morocco
- Region: Rabat-Salé-Kénitra
- Province: Khemisset

Population (2004)
  - Total: 11,831
- Time zone: UTC+0 (GMT)

Tiddas is a commune in Khémisset Province of the Rabat-Salé-Kénitra administrative region of Morocco. At the time of the 2004 census, the commune's total population was 11,831 people living in 2,575 households. Tiddas is noted for its moussem every September, and colourful horsemen.
