= Bouqachmir =

Bouqachmir بوقشمير
- commune
- Interactive map of Bouqachmir
- Country: Morocco
- Region: Rabat-Salé-Kénitra
- Province: Khemisset

Population (2004)
  - Total: 4,454
- Time zone: UTC+0 (GMT)

Bouqachmir is a commune in Khémisset Province of Morocco's Rabat-Salé-Kénitra administrative region. At the 2004 census, the commune had a total population of 4,454 people living in 767 households.
