= Ezzhiliga =

- Commune
- Location within Morocco
- Coordinates: 33°18′N 6°32′W
- Country: Morocco
- Region: Rabat-Salé-Kénitra
- Province: Khemisset

Population (2004)
  - Total: 15,506
- Time zone: UTC+0 (GMT)

Ezzhiliga is a commune in Khémisset Province of Morocco's Rabat-Salé-Kénitra administrative region. At the time of the 2004 census, the commune had a population of 15,506 people living in 2,858 households.
