= Ait Ichou =

- Commune
- Location within Morocco
- Coordinates: 33°33′15″N 6°03′05″W
- Country: Morocco
- Region: Rabat-Salé-Kénitra
- Province: Khemisset

Population (2004)
  - Total: 2,213
- Time zone: UTC+0 (GMT)

Ait Ichou is a commune in Khémisset Province of Morocco's Rabat-Salé-Kénitra administrative region. At the 2004 census, the commune had a total population of 2213 people living in 378 households.
