= Belkacem =

Belkacem is both a given name and a surname. Notable people with the given name or surname include:

== Given name ==
- Belkacem Remache (born 1985), Algerian football player
- Belkacem Zeghmati (born 1957), Algerian politician
- Belkacem Zobiri (born 1983), French-Algerian football player

== Surname ==
- Areski Belkacem (born 1940), also known simply as Areski, is a French singer, multi-instrumentalist, comedian and composer
- Bensayah Belkacem, Bosnian previously held in the United States Guantanamo Bay detainment camps, in Cuba
- Bouteldja Belkacem (1947–2015), Algerian raï songwriter, lyricist and composer
- Fouad Belkacem, spokesman of Sharia4Belgium
- Krim Belkacem (1922–1970), Algerian revolutionary fighter
- Najat Vallaud-Belkacem (born 1977), French socialist politician

== See also ==
- Ait Belkacem, commune in the Khémisset Province of the Rabat-Salé-Zemmour-Zaer administrative region of Morocco
- Oued Irara–Krim Belkacem Airport, airport serving Hassi Messaoud, a city in the Ouargla Province of eastern Algeria
