= Ait Yadine =

- Commune
- Location within Morocco
- Coordinates: 33°58′13″N 6°01′03″W
- Country: Morocco
- Region: Rabat-Salé-Kénitra
- Province: Khemisset

Population (2004)
  - Total: 19,461
- Time zone: UTC+0 (GMT)

Ait Yadine is a commune in the Khémisset Province of Morocco's Rabat-Salé-Kénitra administrative. At the time of the 2004 census, the commune had a total population of 19,461 people living in 3,463 households.
