= Ain Sbit =

Ain Sbit عين السبيت
- Commune
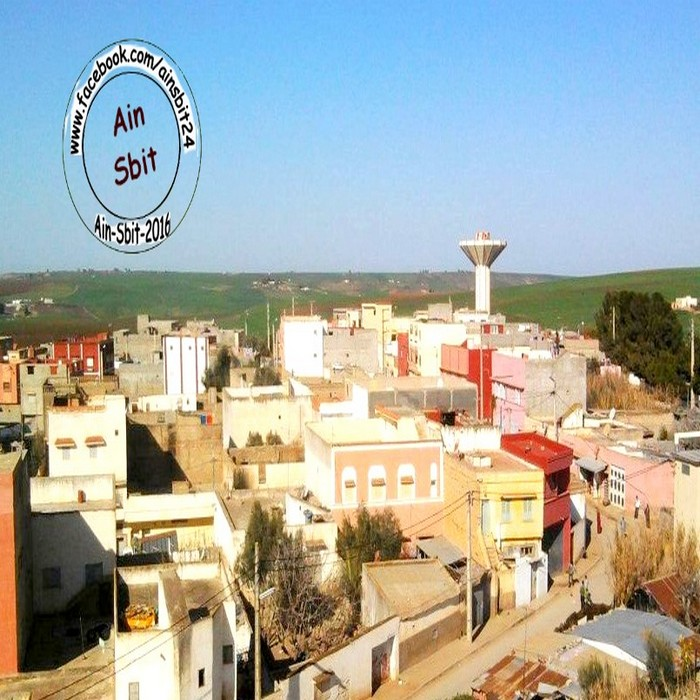

- Location within Morocco
- Country: Morocco
- Region: Rabat-Salé-Kénitra
- Province: Khemisset

Population (2004)
  - Total: 11,411
- Time zone: UTC+0 (GMT)

Ain Sbit is a commune in Khémisset Province of Morocco's Rabat-Salé-Kénitra administrative region. At the time of the 2004 census, the commune had a total population of 11,411 people living in 2,064 households.
