= Ain Johra =

Ain Johra عين جوهرة
- Commune
- Location within Morocco
- Coordinates: 34°06′N 6°21′W
- Country: Morocco
- Region: Rabat-Salé-Kénitra
- Province: Khemisset

Population (2004)
  - Total: 10,151
- Time zone: UTC+0 (GMT)

Ain Johra was a commune in Khémisset Province of the Rabat-Salé-Kénitra administrative region of Morocco. At the 2004 census, the commune had a total population of 10,151 people living in 1,668 households.

the commune was merged with Sidi Boukhalkhal into the Ain Johra-Sidi Boukhalkhal commune.
