= Marchouch =

Marchouch مرشوش
- Commune
- Interactive map of Marchouch
- Coordinates: 33.5581°N 6.6930°W
- Country: Morocco
- Region: Rabat-Salé-Kénitra
- Province: Khemisset

Population (2004)
  - Total: 11,075
- Time zone: UTC+0 (GMT)

Marchouch is a commune in Khémisset Province of the Rabat-Salé-Kénitra administrative region of Morocco. At the 2004 census, the commune had a total population of 11,075 people living in 2,068 households.
