= Sidi Allal Lamsadder =

- Commune
- Interactive map of Sidi Allal Lamsadder
- Coordinates: 33°52′27″N 6°09′01″W
- Country: Morocco
- Region: Rabat-Salé-Kénitra
- Province: Khemisset

Population (2004)
  - Total: 8,740
- Time zone: UTC+0 (GMT)

Sidi Allal Lamsadder is a commune in the Khémisset Province of the Rabat-Salé-Kénitra administrative region of Morocco. At the 2004 census, the commune had a total population of 8,740 people living in 1744 households.
