= Rommani =

Rommani الرماني (Arabic)
- Town
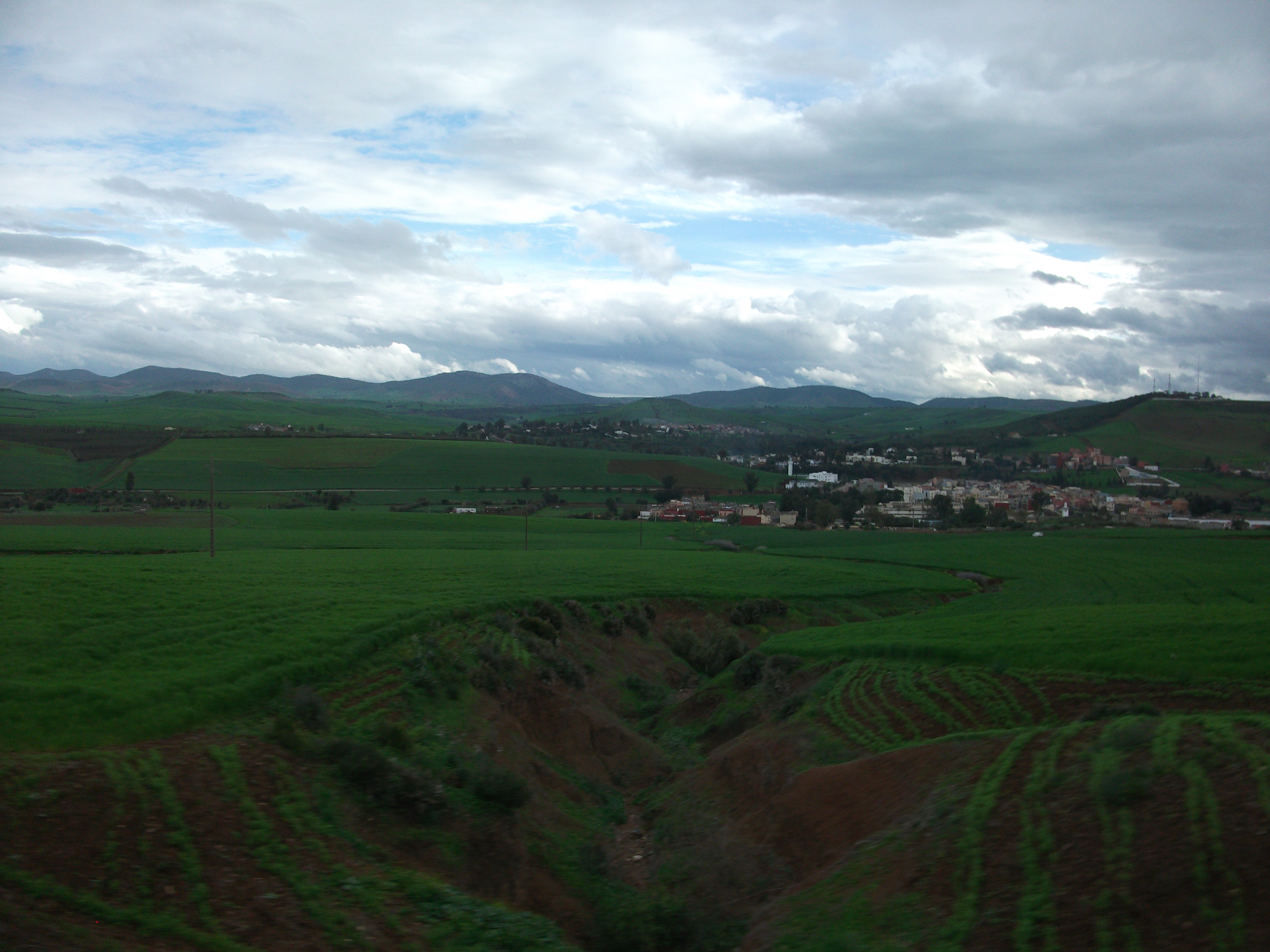
- Interactive map of Rommani
- Coordinates: 33°32′N 6°37′W
- Country: Morocco
- Region: Rabat-Salé-Kénitra
- Province: Khemisset Province
- Established: 1911

Population (2004)
  - Total: 12,172
- Time zone: UTC+0 (GMT)

Rommani (Arabic: الرماني, ar-Rammānī) is a Moroccan town in the region of Rabat-Salé-Kénitra. It lies approximately 60 km (40 Mi) southeast of Morocco's capital of Rabat and 100 km (60 Mi) east of its economic and cultural hub of Casablanca.

== History ==
Camp Marchand (present-day Rommani) was established on 30 July 1911 at Zebida, on the boundary of the Northern (مزارعة) and Southern Zaer (الكفيان). Camp Marchand was a seat of government comparable to a prefecture. The town served as a regional services hub. The town had a post office, which served the surrounding villages of Christian (Brachoua) Le Jacqueline (Zhayliga), Merzougha (Marchouch), N'Nkreila and Sidi Bettache as well as the more dispersed population of the area, including forester's families living in the surrounding forests.

The town rapidly developed during the colonial period. Many immigrants from different regions settled there, mainly Doukala but also from the Sraghna, Chyadma, Iribat (Sahara) and Benimaskine of Soussis Berber tribes. The majority of these tribe members were shopkeepers, field workers or construction workers. The latter were in high demand due to a boost in civil and public construction.

The name of Camp Marchand was changed to Rommani at a later stage. Currently, Rommani is a town of some 15,000 inhabitants.

== Etymology ==
The town's name stems from Oued Romane (واد الرمان), meaning pomegranate river. This wadi runs through the city centre.
