= Ait Ouribel =

- commune
- Location within Morocco
- Coordinates: 33°47′03″N 6°07′41″W
- Country: Morocco
- Region: Rabat-Salé-Kénitra
- Province: Khemisset

Population (2004)
  - Total: 10,224
- Time zone: UTC+0 (GMT)

Ait Ouribel is a commune in the Khémisset Province of Morocco's Rabat-Salé-Kénitra administrative region. At the 2004 census, the commune had a total population of 10,224 people living in 1746 households.
