= Khemisset =

Town in Rabat-Salé-Kénitra, Morocco

Khemisset الخميسات ⵅⵎⵉⵙⴰⵜ
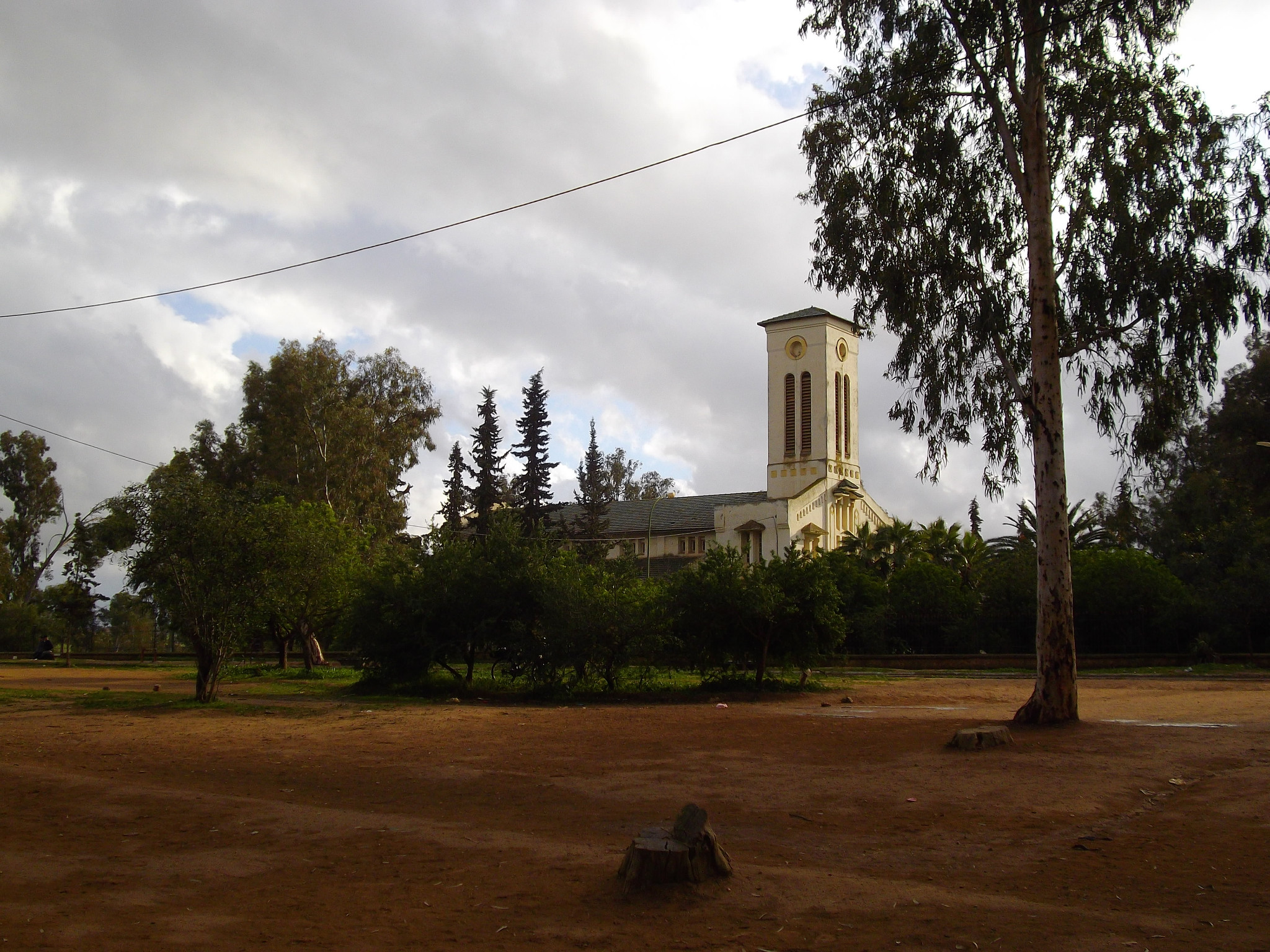
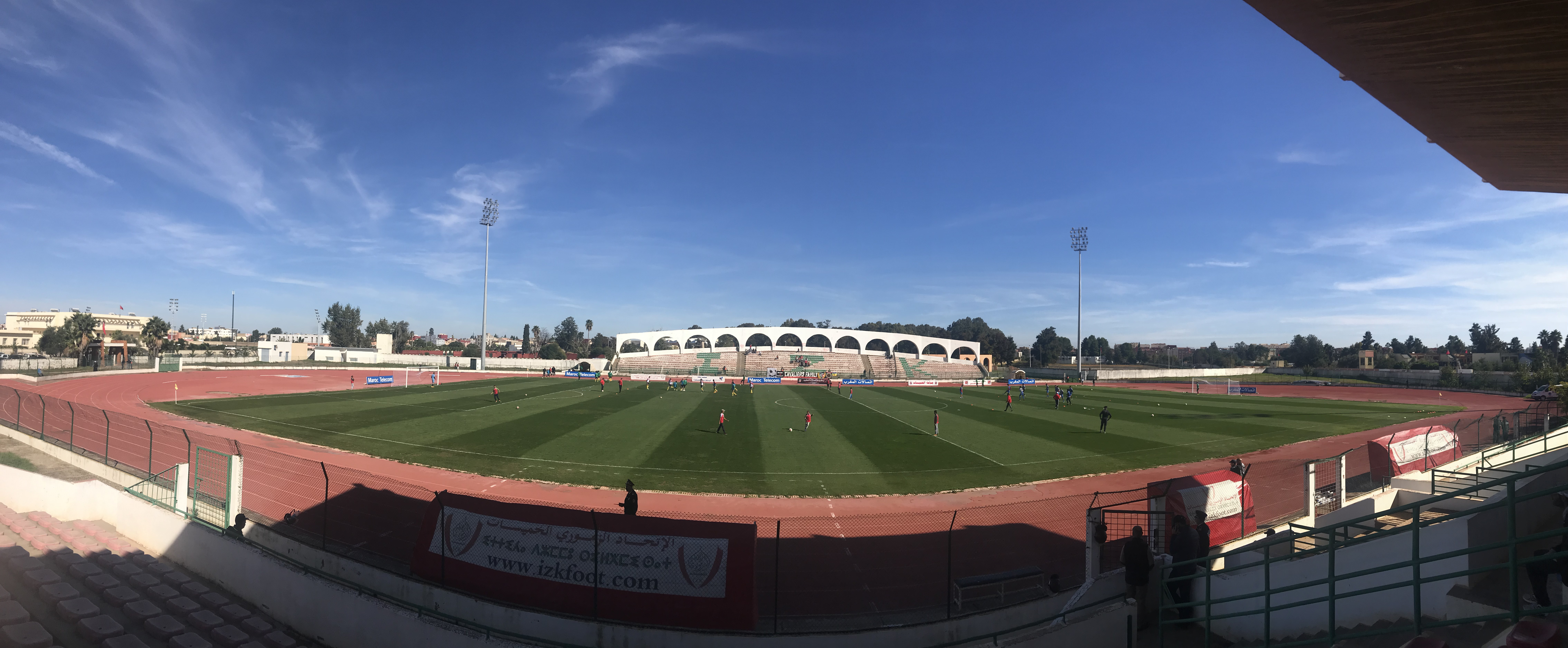
- Interactive map of Khemisset
- Coordinates: 33°49′N 6°04′W
- Country: Morocco
- Region: Rabat-Salé-Kénitra
- Province: Khemisset

Government
  - Mayor: Hassan Missour (MP)

Population (2024)
  - Total: 125,834
  - Rank: 24th in Morocco
- Time zone: UTC+0 (GMT)

Khemisset (Note: Arabic: الخميسات; Standard Moroccan Tamazight: ⵅⵎⵉⵙⴰⵜ, romanized: xmisat) is a city in northern Morocco with a population of 125,834 recorded in the 2024 Moroccan census. It is situated on the A2 motorway between Rabat (81 km) and Meknès (57 km), and is the capital of Khémisset Province.

From 1912 to 1914 the French built a 600 mm narrow gauge railway from Rabat via Souk el Abra des Sehoul, Tiflet, Dar Caid Bou Driss to Khemisset. It was abandoned in 1935 and lifted before 1942. Between Tiflet and Khemisset, the old track bed of narrow gauge line was later built to Rabat Khemisset main road.

== Geography ==
Khémisset Province is located between the Atlas and the northwest, and is 37 km away from the ocean. The climate is moderate and conducive to agriculture. The region has two dams, eighteen valleys, and a dayet roumi.

The Khemisset region represents Morocco's production of lentils, where 10,000 hectares are cultivated annually, and the production is to 100,000 quintals. Sweet grapes for wine are also widely produced.

=== Potash field ===
In 2019, 580 million tons of potash were discovered in the province of Khemisset. Production will begin in 2024 by company Emmerson PLC. The initial production will be an estimated 800,000 tons annually.

== Notable people ==
- Aziz Ouhadi, Track and field runner
- Brahim Boutayeb, former runner
- Hussein Ammouta, football coach
- Najat Aatabou, Singer, songwriter and composer
- Omar Boutmazought, singer
