= M'Qam Tolba =

- Commune
- Interactive map of M'Qam Tolba
- Coordinates: 33°56′15″N 6°15′16″W
- Country: Morocco
- Region: Rabat-Salé-Kénitra
- Province: Khemisset

Population (2004)
  - Total: 14,705
- Time zone: UTC+0 (GMT)

M'Qam Tolba is a commune in Khémisset Province of Morocco's Rabat-Salé-Kénitra administrative. At the 2004 census, the commune had a population of 14,705 people in 2,244 households.
