= Ait Belkacem =

- Commune
- Location within Morocco
- Coordinates: 33.8282°N 6.3761°W
- Country: Morocco
- Region: Rabat-Salé-Kénitra
- Province: Khemisset

Population (2004)
  - Total: 4,915
- Time zone: UTC+0 (GMT)

Ait Belkacem is a commune in Khémisset Province of the Rabat-Salé-Kénitra administrative region of Morocco. At the time of the 2004 census, the commune had a population of 4,915 people living in 890 households.
