= Maamora Forest =

Protected area in Morocco

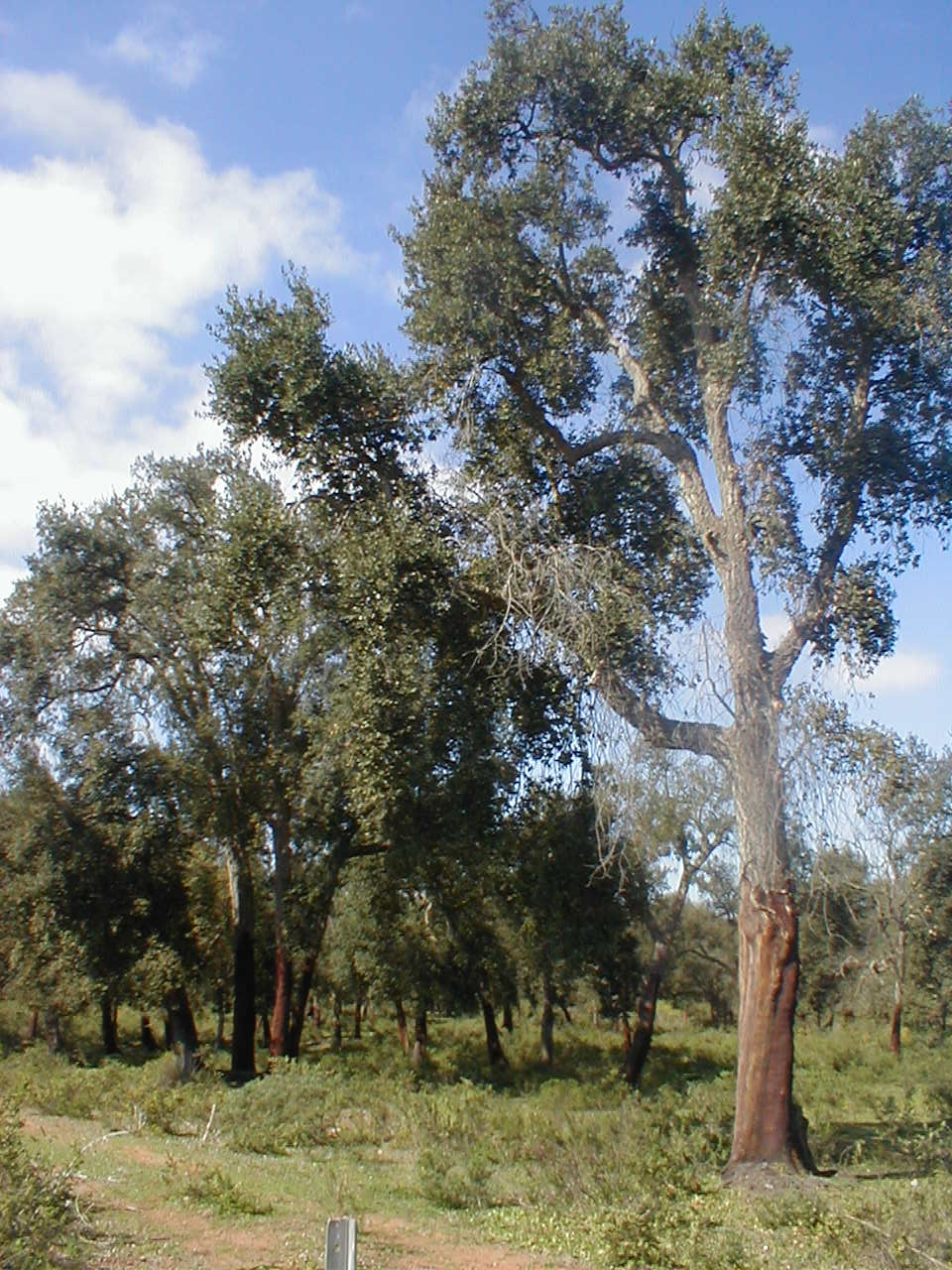
- Interactive map of Maamora Forest

Geography
- Location: Morocco
- Coordinates: 34°06′N 6°36′W
- Area: 1,300 km^{2} (500 sq mi)

Maamora Forest or Al-Mamoura Forest in Morocco is the largest Quercus suber forest in the world, with an area of 130,000 hectares. It is situated on the Atlantic coast between the cities of Rabat and Kenitra and is primarily composed of four tree species: Quercus suber, eucalyptus, pinales, and acacias. The forest is home to a diverse array of plant species and serves as a vital habitat for numerous animal species. However, the ecological balance of the forest is threatened by overgrazing and logging activities. The expansion of urban and agricultural areas is placing increasing pressure on the forest, leading to a reduction in its area. In response, the authorities issued a real estate map in 2008, clearly defining the boundaries of the forest to deter any attempts to seize or illegally own it.

== Location ==
The Maamora Forest is situated in the Kenitra region of Morocco, between the cities of Rabat and Kenitra. It is located in northwestern Morocco, near the Atlantic Ocean, extending from the coastline inland towards the country's interior. The forest extends for a distance of over 68 kilometers in a westerly direction and 38.2 kilometers in an easterly direction, spanning a width of 38.2 kilometers from north to south. Its total area encompasses approximately 131,800 hectares. the Maamora Forest is subdivided into three distinct geographical units: Western Maamora, Central Maamora, and Eastern Maamora. These three regions are situated within the administrative boundaries of the Kenitra, Sidi Slimane, and Sidi Kacem provinces.

== Biodiversity ==
The Maamora Forest is the largest in Morocco. It boasts a diverse biosphere and biological heritage, which collectively make it the most important biological and ecological center in Morocco. The forest's vegetation includes a plethora of major plant species and rare species, including oak, pine, eucalyptus, acacia, carob, camphor, cypress, thuya, wild olive, as well as the cork oak. It is the dominant species in the forest, covering about half of the total surface area in Maamora and distributed over 60000 ha, making the Maamora Forest the largest forest in the world containing cork oak. In addition to diverse funga, the most prominent of which are of the Terfezia genus.

The forest also serves as a habitat for many animal species, including over 40 mammal species, such as the wild boar and red fox, nearly 200 avian species, and numerous reptiles and amphibians, among which are several rare turtles. Additionally, the forest is home to several rare turtle species. It also contains a diverse array of parasites, natural pests, and insects, including Cerambyx cerdo, hymenoptera, ants, and lepidoptera. Among the animal species that inhabit the forest are the Barbary stag, the Golden eagle, and the Great spotted woodpecker.

== Resources ==
The Mamoura Forest is located in the Rabat-Salé-Kénitra region and extends over an area of more than 130,000 hectares from the Atlantic coast in the west to the city of Tiflet in the east and from the Bou Regreg Valley in the south to the plains of the west in the north. It represents a suitable living environment for many animals and plants, it is a reservoir of biodiversity. It also preserves soil from erosion and desertification, and protects biodiversity from extinction. The forest is home to the most important sources of fresh groundwater in the region.

The Maamoura Forest is a significant national heritage site, a recreational space, and a natural outlet for the region's inhabitants. In addition to providing resources such as timber, charcoal, and tanning material for traditional craftsmen, oak fruits, cork production, firewood, honey, medicinal herbs, and fungi, the forest plays an integral role in the region's socioeconomic development. Furthermore, the forest serves as a vast grazing area, providing employment opportunities and contributing to the socioeconomic development of neighboring regions. The forest is home to over 50 enterprises engaged in forest-related activities, 10 units dedicated to cork processing, 200 individual forest users, and nine economic benefit groups representing approximately 34 forest cooperatives. In addition to its economic and environmental functions, the forest also serves social and recreational purposes, making it an integrated multi-functional space and a catalyst for local and regional development.

== Gallery ==
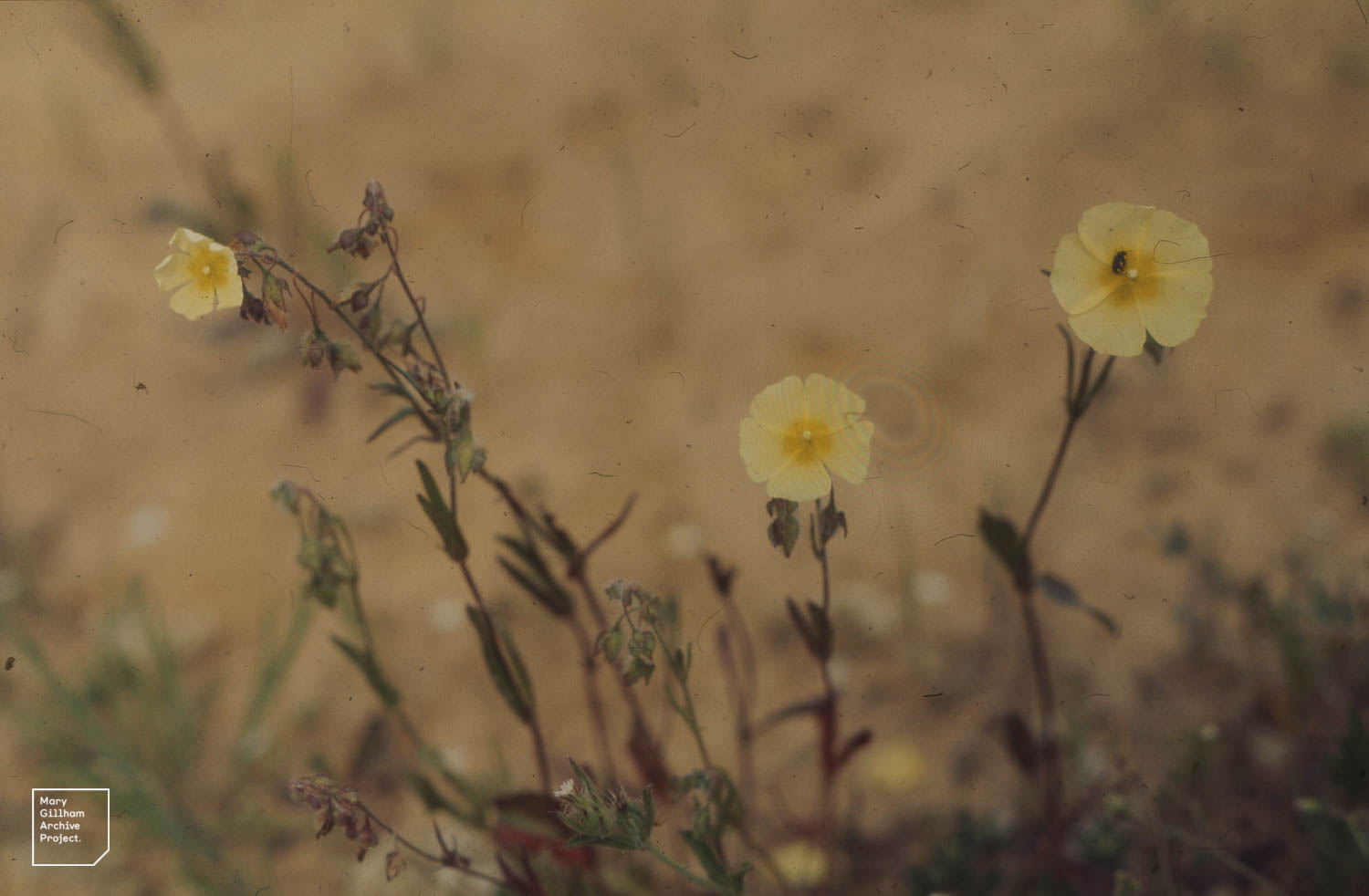
Maamora Forest is Morocco's largest Quercus suber forest, situated on the Atlantic coast northeast of Rabat

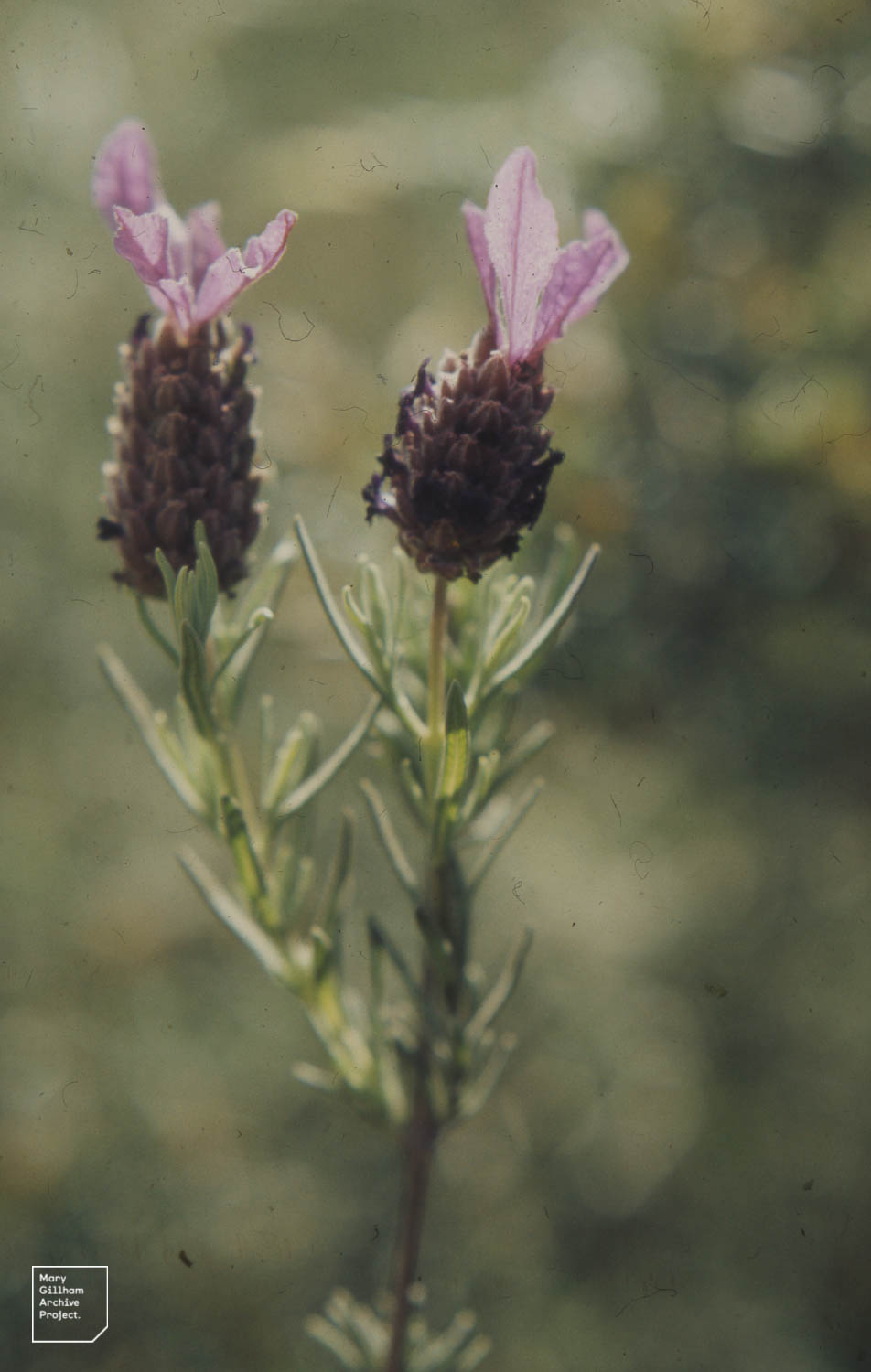
Lavandula stoechas

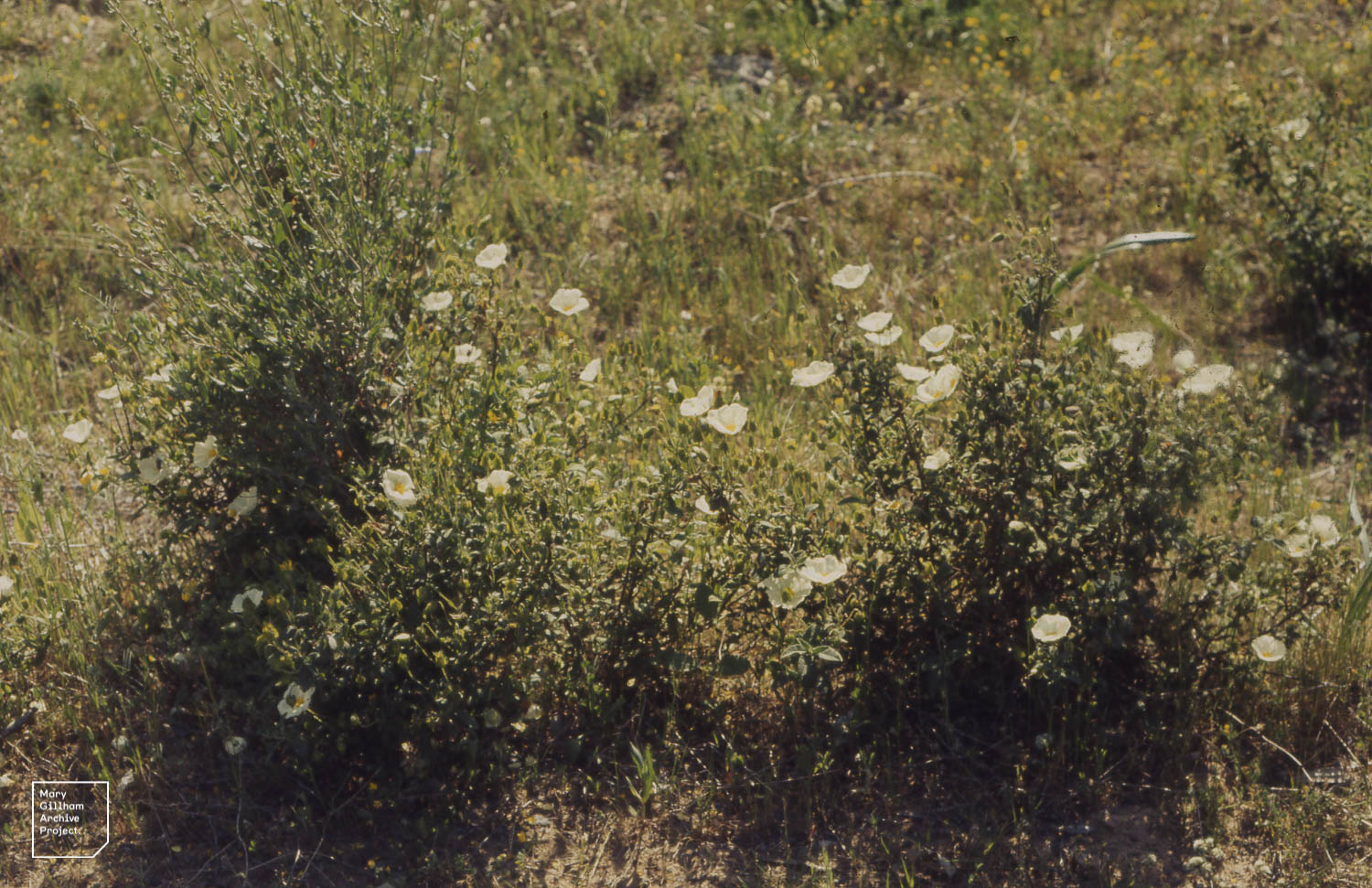
Cistus salviifolius

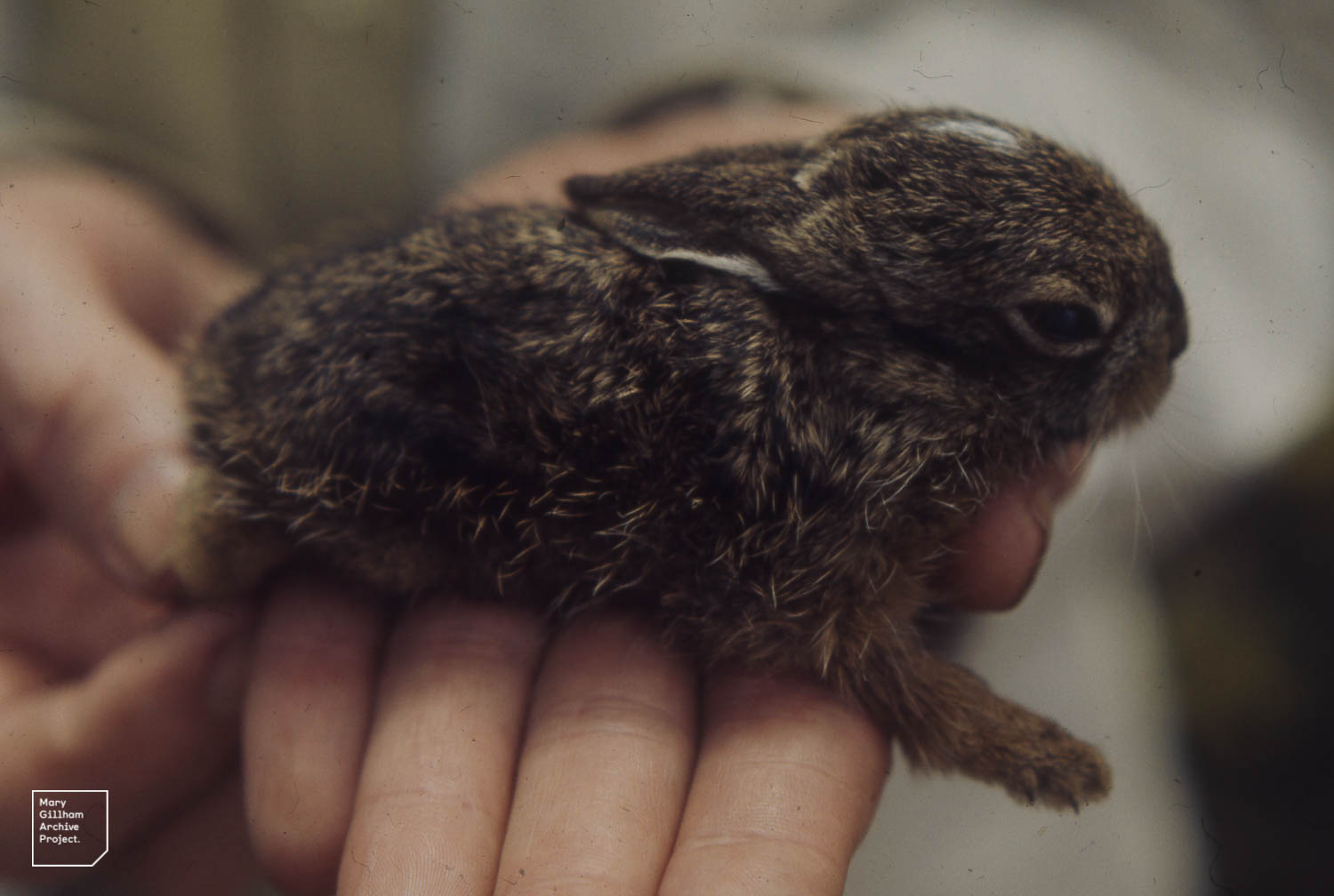
A small rabbit, native to coastal habitats, in the Maamora Forest
