= Tiflet =

Tiflet ⵜⵉⴼⵍⵜ تيفلت Tifelt
- City
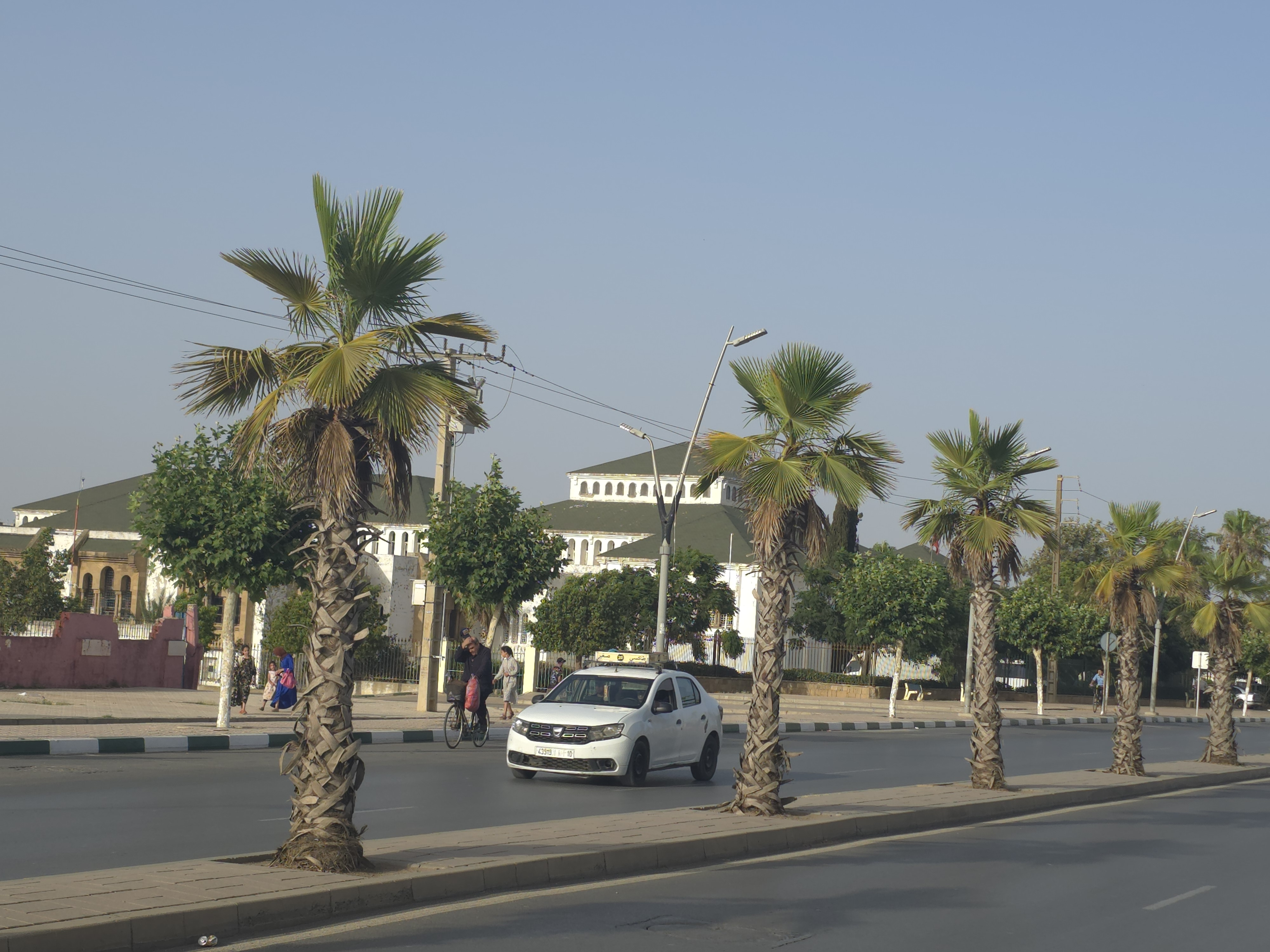
- Interactive map of Tiflet
- Coordinates: 33°53′35″N 6°18′25″W
- Country: Morocco
- Region: Rabat-Salé-Kénitra
- Province: Khémisset

Population (2024)
  - Total: 103,850
- Time zone: UTC+0 (GMT)

Tiflet (Arabic: تيفلت; Standard Moroccan Tamazight: ⵜⵉⴼⵍⵜ), commonly known as Tifelt, is a city in Khémisset Province, Morocco, located between Khemisset and Rabat.

The name means "pebble" in Tamazight, or is a contraction of tififelt, ‘pepper,’ itself a borrowing of Arabic filfil.

As of the 2024 Moroccan census, it had a population of 103,850 inhabitants.

== Ain Johra Industrial Park ==
In March 2025, the Moroccan government approved a decree to expand the Ain Johra Industrial Acceleration Zone (ZAI d’Ain Johra), located west of the city within the nearby commune of Sidi Boukhalkhal, Khémisset Province. Presented by the Minister of Industry and Commerce, the project increased the total area of the industrial park to over 117 hectares to accommodate growing investor demand in the Rabat-Salé-Kénitra region.

== US Peace Corps work ==
Tiflet was served by workers of the United States Peace Corps until the 9/11 attacks on the U.S. The workers had been assisting local women in a beekeeping cooperative, until they were evacuated by the U.S. government for concerns over their safety. The Peace Corps have since returned and now focus primarily on job skills workshops and English language classes.

== See also ==
- Rabat-Fes expressway
