= Majmaa Tolba =

- Commune
- Interactive map of Majmaa Tolba
- Country: Morocco
- Region: Rabat-Salé-Kénitra
- Province: Khemisset

Population (2004)
  - Total: 16,698
- Time zone: UTC+0 (GMT)

Majmaa Tolba is a commune in the Khémisset Province of Morocco's Rabat-Salé-Kénitra administrative region. At the 2004 census, the commune had a population of 16,698 people living in 3341 households.
