= Khémisset Province =

Province of Morocco

Coordinates: 33°49′N 6°04′W

Khemisset Province إقليم الخميسات ⵜⴰⵙⴳⴰ ⵏ ⵅⵎⵉⵙⴰⵜ
- Province
- The Archaeological Site of Oued Beht Western Middle Atlas mountains Roumi lake

- Flag
- Interactive map of Khemisset Province
- Country: Morocco
- Region: Rabat-Salé-Kénitra
- Seat: Khemisset

Area
  - Total: 8,305 km^{2} (3,207 sq mi)

Population (2024)
  - Total: 563,036

Khemisset Province is an administrative subdivision of Morocco, located in the Rabat-Salé-Kénitra region.

The major cities are:

- Khemisset
- Tiflet
- Sidi Allal El Bahraoui
- Rommani

== History ==
The province was established by a royal decree on 13 August 1973.

It largely corresponds to the historical territory of the Zemmour tribal confederation, which has played a central role in shaping the region’s social and cultural identity.

== Geography ==
The province covers an area of 8,305 square kilometres (3,207 sq mi). It is bordered to the north by Kenitra Province, to the south by Khouribga Province and Khénifra Province, to the east by the Meknès Prefecture, and to the west by Rabat and the Salé Prefecture.

The territory features varied landscapes, including plateaus, valleys, and mountainous zones, forming a transition between the Gharb plain and the Middle Atlas.

== Culture ==
The cultural identity of the province is strongly associated with the Zemmour tribes.

The most commonly spoken languages are Moroccan Arabic and Tamazight.

Traditional clothing includes items such as the cherbil, a decorative slipper worn by women, as well as the djellaba and the burnous (azennar) made of fine wool for men. Women also wear garments such as the caftan, the tahtiya, the dfina, and the bediiya, often characterized by bright colors and ornamental details.

Community gatherings and ceremonies are traditionally held in large tents made of goat hair.

Local craftsmanship is particularly known for the production of ahanbel, a handwoven wool rug comparable to the kilim.

Regional cuisine includes dishes such as grilled meats, couscous, and mechoui.

Festive traditions include the organization of moussems, notably the festival of Moulay Abdelkader Jilali in Aït Yadine.

The ahidous dance is a prominent form of cultural expression, performed collectively with poetic chants (izlan) and accompanied by the tallunt, a traditional percussion instrument.

== Subdivisions ==
The province is divided administratively into the following:

Name	Geographic code	Type	Households	Population (2004)	Foreign population	Moroccan population	Notes
Khemisset	291.01.01.	Municipality	22769	105088	70	105018	
Rommani	291.01.03.	Municipality	2614	12172	5	12167	
Tiflet	291.01.05.	Municipality	14790	69640	34	69606	
Ait Mimoune	291.03.01.	Rural commune	1918	10236	0	10236	
Ait Ouribel	291.03.03.	Rural commune	1746	10224	1	10223	
Ait Siberne	291.03.05.	Rural commune	1001	5232	0	5232	
Ait Yadine	291.03.07.	Rural commune	3463	19461	0	19461	
El Ganzra	291.03.09.	Rural commune	2107	13404	0	13404	
Majmaa Tolba	291.03.11.	Rural commune	3341	16698	1	16697	
Sfassif	291.03.13.	Rural commune	1467	8051	0	8051	
Sidi Allal Lamsadder	291.03.15.	Rural commune	1744	8740	1	8739	
Sidi El Ghandour	291.03.17.	Rural commune	3764	18587	8	18579	
Ait Ichou	291.05.01.	Rural commune	378	2213	0	2213	
Ait Ikkou	291.05.03.	Rural commune	1995	10676	0	10676	
Bouqachmir	291.05.05.	Rural commune	767	4454	0	4454	
Houderrane	291.05.07.	Rural commune	1484	6572	0	6572	
Maaziz	291.05.09.	Rural commune	2772	12171	4	12167	9190 residents live in the center, called Mâaziz; 2981 residents live in rural areas.
Oulmes	291.05.11.	Rural commune	4107	19014	0	19014	9460 residents live in the center, called Oulmes; 9554 residents live in rural areas.
Tiddas	291.05.13.	Rural commune	2575	11831	0	11831	3584 residents live in the center, called Tidass; 8247 residents live in rural areas.
Ain Sbit	291.07.01.	Rural commune	2064	11411	1	11410	
Brachoua	291.07.05.	Rural commune	2256	12371	1	12370	
Ezzhiliga	291.07.07.	Rural commune	2858	15506	0	15506	
Jemaat Moul Blad	291.07.09.	Rural commune	1135	6429	0	6429	
Laghoualem	291.07.11.	Rural commune	2222	12560	0	12560	
Marchouch	291.07.13.	Rural commune	2068	11075	0	11075	
Moulay Driss Aghbal	291.07.15.	Rural commune	974	5603	0	5603	
Ain Johra	291.09.01.	Rural commune	1668	10151	1	10150	
Ait Belkacem	291.09.03.	Rural commune	890	4915	0	4915	
Ait Bouyahya El Hajjama	291.09.05.	Rural commune	1066	5514	0	5514	
Ait Malek	291.09.07.	Rural commune	824	4396	0	4396	
Khemis Sidi Yahya	291.09.09.	Rural commune	1255	6562	0	6562	
M'Qam Tolba	291.09.11.	Rural commune	2244	14705	0	14705	
Sidi Abderrazak	291.09.13.	Rural commune	2382	13654	2	13652	
Sidi Boukhalkhal	291.09.15.	Rural commune	1236	7200	0	7200	
Sidi Allal El Bahraoui	291.09.17.	Rural commune	3052	15299	11	15288	9884 residents live in the center, called Sidi Allal El Bahra; 5415 residents live in rural areas.
