= Sidi Boukhalkhal =

Sidi Boukhalkhal سيدي بوخلخال
- Commune
- Interactive map of Sidi Boukhalkhal
- Coordinates: 34°06′00″N 6°22′06″W
- Country: Morocco
- Region: Rabat-Salé-Kénitra
- Province: Khemisset

Population (2004)
  - Total: 7,200
- Time zone: UTC+0 (GMT)

Sidi Boukhalkhal is a rural commune in the Khémisset Province of Morocco's Rabat-Salé-Kénitra administrative region. At the time of the 2004 census, the commune's total population was 7,200 living in 1,236 households.
