= Staraya Tolba =

Staraya Tolba Старая Толба
- Village
- Location within Vladimir Oblast Location within Russia
- Coordinates: 56°16′N 39°37′E
- Country: Russia
- Region: Vladimir Oblast
- District: Kolchuginsky District
- Time zone: UTC+3:00

Staraya Tolba (Russian: Старая Толба) is a rural locality (a village) in Yesiplevskoye Rural Settlement, Kolchuginsky District, Vladimir Oblast, Russia. The population was 8 as of 2010. There are 2 streets.

== Geography ==
Staraya Tolba is located 22 km east of Kolchugino (the district's administrative centre) by road. Novobusino is the nearest rural locality.
