= Rabat-Salé-Kénitra =

Region of Morocco

Rabat-Salé-Kenitra Region جهة الرباط-سلا-القنيطرة (Arabic) ⵜⴰⵎⵏⴰⴹⵜ ⵏ ⵕⵕⴱⴰⵟ-ⵙⴰⵍⴰ-ⵍⵇⵏⵉⵟⵕⴰ (Standard Moroccan Tamazight)
- Region
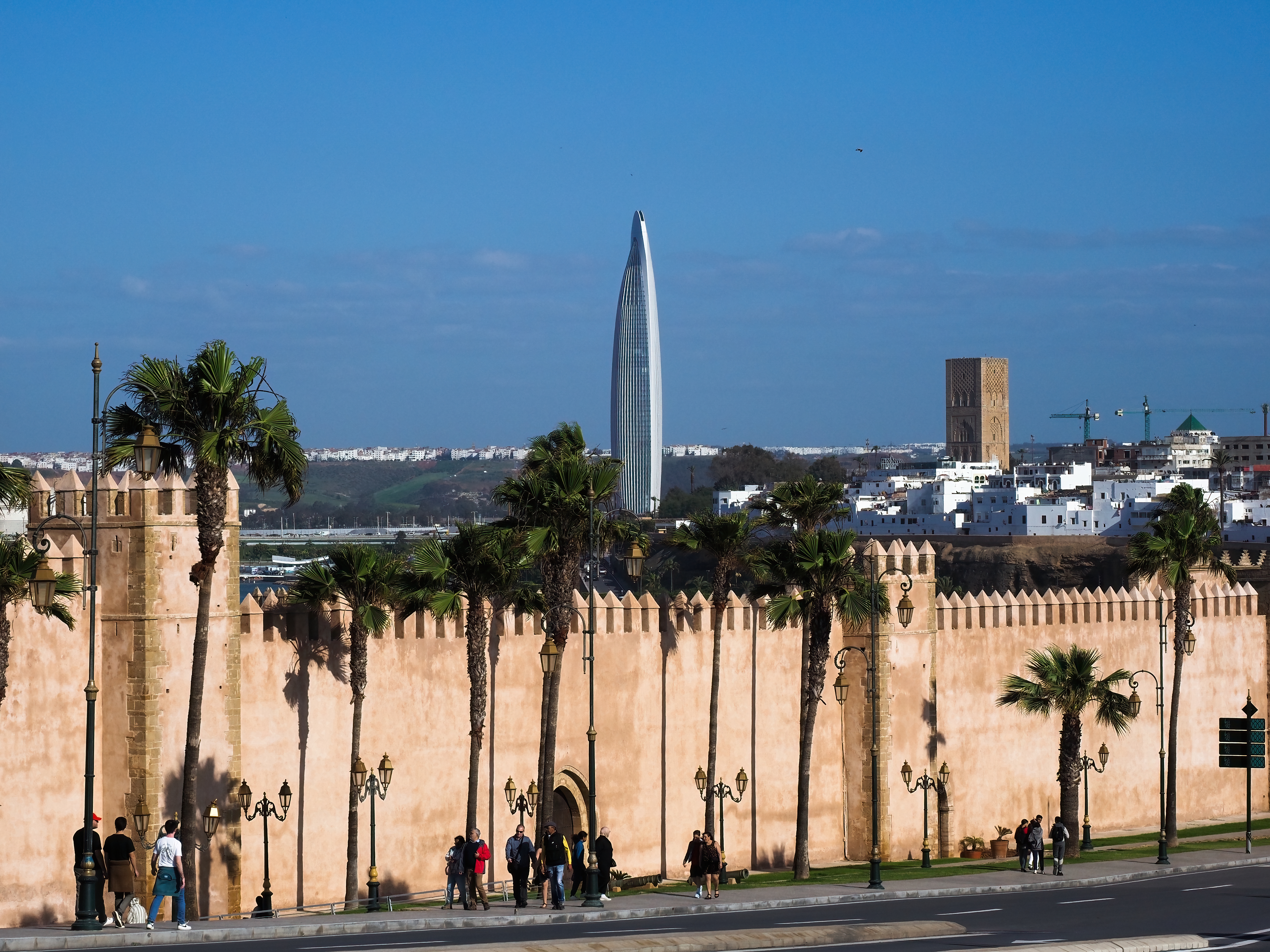

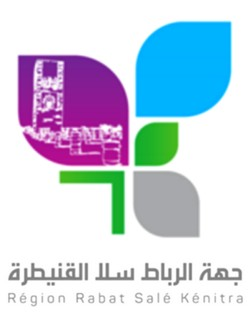
- Seal

- Location in Morocco
- Coordinates: 34°02′N 6°50′W
- Country: Morocco
- Capital: Rabat

Government
  - Wali: Mohammed Yacoubi
  - President: Rachid El Abdi (RNI)

Area
  - Total: 18,194 km^{2} (7,025 sq mi)

Population (2024)
  - Total: 5,132,639
  - Rank: 2nd out of 12 regions
  - Density: 282.11/km^{2} (730.65/sq mi)
- Time zone: UTC+0 (GMT)

Rabat-Salé-Kénitra (Note: Arabic: الرباط-سلا-القنيطرة, romanized: ar-ribāṭ salā al-qunayṭira Standard Moroccan Tamazight: ⵕⵕⴱⴰⵟ-ⵙⴰⵍⴰ-ⵍⵇⵏⵉⵟⵕⴰ) is one of twelve administrative regions of Morocco. It is situated in north-western Morocco and has a population of 5,132,639 (2024 census). The capital is Rabat.

The national rail operator ONCF initiated construction on a Regional Express Network (RER) to enhance urban mobility across the region. The line covers a 54 km corridor connecting Kenitra to Skhirat, with stops in Salé, Rabat and Temara across 12 stations. The complete journey along the line will take approximately 1 hour and 10 minutes, operating at 15 minute intervals. with completion targeted ahead of the 2030 FIFA World Cup.

== History ==
Rabat-Salé-Kenitra was formed in September 2015 by merging Rabat-Salé-Zemmour-Zaer with the region of Gharb-Chrarda-Béni Hssen.

== Government ==
=== Subdivisions ===
The region is made up into the following provinces and prefectures:

Provinces of Rabat-Salé-Kénitra

Province/Prefecture	Population (2024)
Kenitra Province	1,284,247
Salé Prefecture	1,089,554
Skhirate-Témara Prefecture	783,475
Khemisset Province	563,036
Sidi Kacem Province	545,509
Rabat Prefecture	515,619
Sidi Slimane Province	351,199

Wali of Rabat-Salé-Kénitra since 2015
Name	Duration	Under
Abdelouafi Laftit	2015–2017	King Mohammed VI
Mohamed Mhidia	2017–2019	King Mohammed VI
Mohamd Yacoubi	2019–present	King Mohammed VI

Regional Council Presidents of Rabat-Salé-Kénitra since 2015
Name	Duration	Party	Under
Abdessamad Sekkal	2015–2021	PJD	King Mohammed VI
Rachid El Abdi	2021–present	PAM	King Mohammed VI

== Sports ==
=== Football ===
Rabat is home to one of Morocco's most successful teams, ASFAR, that has been prominent in competing both domestically and internationally. Domestically, they are placed second overall alongside Raja of Casablanca in the number of league titles, and hold the record for number of Throne Cup wins. Their female counterpart is the most successful women's team and is placed first in the amount of league titles won, by a margin of 9 titles over second place. They are the current record holders for the number of trophies won in their respective league, Throne Cup, and internationally in the CAF Women's Champions League.

The sports teams listed below are some of the teams that are based in Rabat-Salé-Kénitra region:

- AS FAR
- Fath Union Sport
- UTS Rabat
- US Yacoub El Mansour
- AS Salé
- Kénitra AC
- AS FAR (women)
