= Oulad H'Cine =

Oulad H'Cine اولاد احسين Oulad Bou el Hsaïn Dar Oulad Bou Hsaïne Oulad Bel Houcine Oulad Hsaïne, Awlad Ahcene
- Rural commune and town
- Location within Morocco
- Coordinates: 34.3933°N 5.7633°W
- Country: Morocco
- Region: Rabat-Salé-Kénitra
- Province: Sidi Slimane

Population (2004)
  - Total: 27,972
- Time zone: UTC+0 (GMT)

Oulad H'Cine is a small town and rural commune in Sidi Slimane Province, Rabat-Salé-Kénitra, Morocco. At the time of the 2004 census, the commune had a total population of 27,972 people living in 4389 households.

== Geography ==
Oulad H'Cine commune is located in the northeast corner of Sidi Slimane Province, with Chbanate to the south, Bir Taleb to the southeast, Khnichet to the east, Sidi M'Hamed Chelh to the northeast, and Al Haouafate to the northwest, all five of Sidi Kacem Province. To the west and southwest of Oulad H'Cine commune is M'Saada, its only adjacent commune in Sidi Slimane Province. R413, the road from the town of Sidi Kacem to Al Haouafate is the boundary between M'Saada and Oulad H'Cine.
