= Gharb-Chrarda-Béni Hssen =

Gharb-Chrarda-Béni Hssen الغرب شراردة بني حسين
- Region
- Location in Morocco
- Coordinates: 34°15′N 6°35′W
- Country: Morocco
- Capital: Kenitra

Area
  - Total: 8,805 km^{2} (3,400 sq mi)

Population (2014 census)
  - Total: 1,904,112
- Time zone: UTC+0 (WET)
  - Summer (DST): UTC+1 (WEST)
- ISO 3166 code: MA-02

Gharb-Chrarda-Béni Hssen (Arabic: الغرب شراردة بني حسين) was formerly one of the sixteen regions of Morocco from 1997 to 2015. It was situated in north-western Morocco, covers an area of 8,805 square kilometres (3,400 mi^{2}) and has a population of 1,904,112 (2014 census). The capital was Kenitra.

The region lacks economic and geographic unity. In particular, while it resembles and is closely connected with the Loukos region which is administrated by the Tanger-Tétouan region, the Gharb is ruled from Kenitra with which it has little connections. Kenitra itself is integrated in the urban corridor that extends southward through Rabat and Casablanca to El Jadida.

== Administrative divisions ==
The region consisted of the following provinces:

- Kénitra Province (now part of the Rabat-Salé-Kénitra Region)
- Sidi Kacem Province (now part of the Rabat-Salé-Kénitra Region)
- Sidi Slimane Province (now part of the Rabat-Salé-Kénitra Region)

== Antiquity ==
In ancient times this region was part of Mauretania Tingitana, which was ruled in early times by the Phoenicians and later by the Mauretanians and Romans. Major settlements from these eras were located at Volubilis and at Chellah.

== Geography ==
The administrative region extends about 80 kilometres (50 mi) along the coast of Morocco and about 90 kilometres (56 mi) inland. The major river is the Sebou River which flows west out of the Al Wahda Dam in eastern Gharb, past Jorf El Melha and Mechra Bel Ksiri after which it turns southwest and flows through Kenitra, where it is navigable below that point. Most of the region is located in the Gharb Basin (Rharb Basin) which forms a low-land plain extending west and southwest from the Prerif Ridges of the Rif Mountains to the east and northeast. The town of Souq Larb’a al-Gharb is centrally located within the basin. The Gharb Basin covers an area of some 4,000 square kilometres (1,500 sq mi).

Kenitra is the largest city, with Sidi Slimane and Sidi Kacem being second and third.

== Oil and gas ==
The Gharb Basin has been explored for oil and gas since the 1920. Commercial production of natural gas began in 1963, with new fields being brought on line through the 1990s. The gas is generally found in shallow deposits at a depth ranging from 900 m to 1800 m.

== Demographics ==
From 2004 to 2014 the area experienced a modest 2.3% growth in population from 1,859,540 to 1,904,112, available water being the main limitation on growth.

== Agricultural productivity ==
The Gharb is the second most important agricultural region of Morocco after Tadla-Azilal. In 2001, there were officially 91,800 hectares irrigated plus about 20,000 hectares with pumps directly accessing the oueds. Together with the Loukos region it produces some 95% of Morocco's rice, 75% of the country's production of sugar cane, 50% of the oleaginous plants, as well as 65% of the strawberries exported by Morocco.

Historically the Gharb Basin has been developed for numerous agricultural purposes ranging as widely as eucalyptus farms to beekeeping.

The colons under French rule (as further North under Spanish rule in the Loukos valley) were fully conscious of the region's production capacities and settled in the Gharb in large numbers. About 800 farms covered some 200,000 hectares (a fourth of the region's total). Two lesser urban centers arose from colonization: Mechra Bel Ksiri and Sidi Slimane.

A number of factories have been created to process some of the Gharb's agricultural production. For instance, there are now five sugar refineries. The development of the Gharb region relies heavily on the dams Idriss I on the Inaouen River and Al Wahda Dam on the Ouerrha both for electricity and irrigation. Headwaters for these rivers lie in the Middle Atlas region, where prehistorically the upper watershed supported much more vigorous and extensive forests, such that flooding was moderated and year round flow was increased compared to current times.

The center of the region is the most productive, but there has been recent development in the west along the ocean. On the other hand the southern and eastern parts of the region remain marginal and pauperized.

== Bibliography ==
- Crane, Eva (1999). The world history of beekeeping and honey hunting. New York: Routledge. ISBN 978-0-415-92467-2.
- Hogan, C. Michael (2007). Burnham, A. (ed.). "Volubilis - Ancient Village or Settlement in Morocco". Megalithic Portal. Archived from the original on 30 October 2013.
- Berriane, Mohamed; et al. (2002). Troin, Jean-François (ed.). Maroc: Régions, Pays, Territoires (in French). Paris: Maisonneuve & Larose. pp. 104–127. ISBN 978-2-7068-1630-7.
