= Tangier-Assilah Prefecture =

Coordinates: 35.7667°N 5.8000°W

Tangier-Assilah Prefecture عمالة طنجة أصيلة ⵜⴰⵎⵏⴱⴰⴹⵜ ⵏ ⵟⴰⵏⵊⴰ-ⴰⵚⵉⵍⴰ
- Prefecture
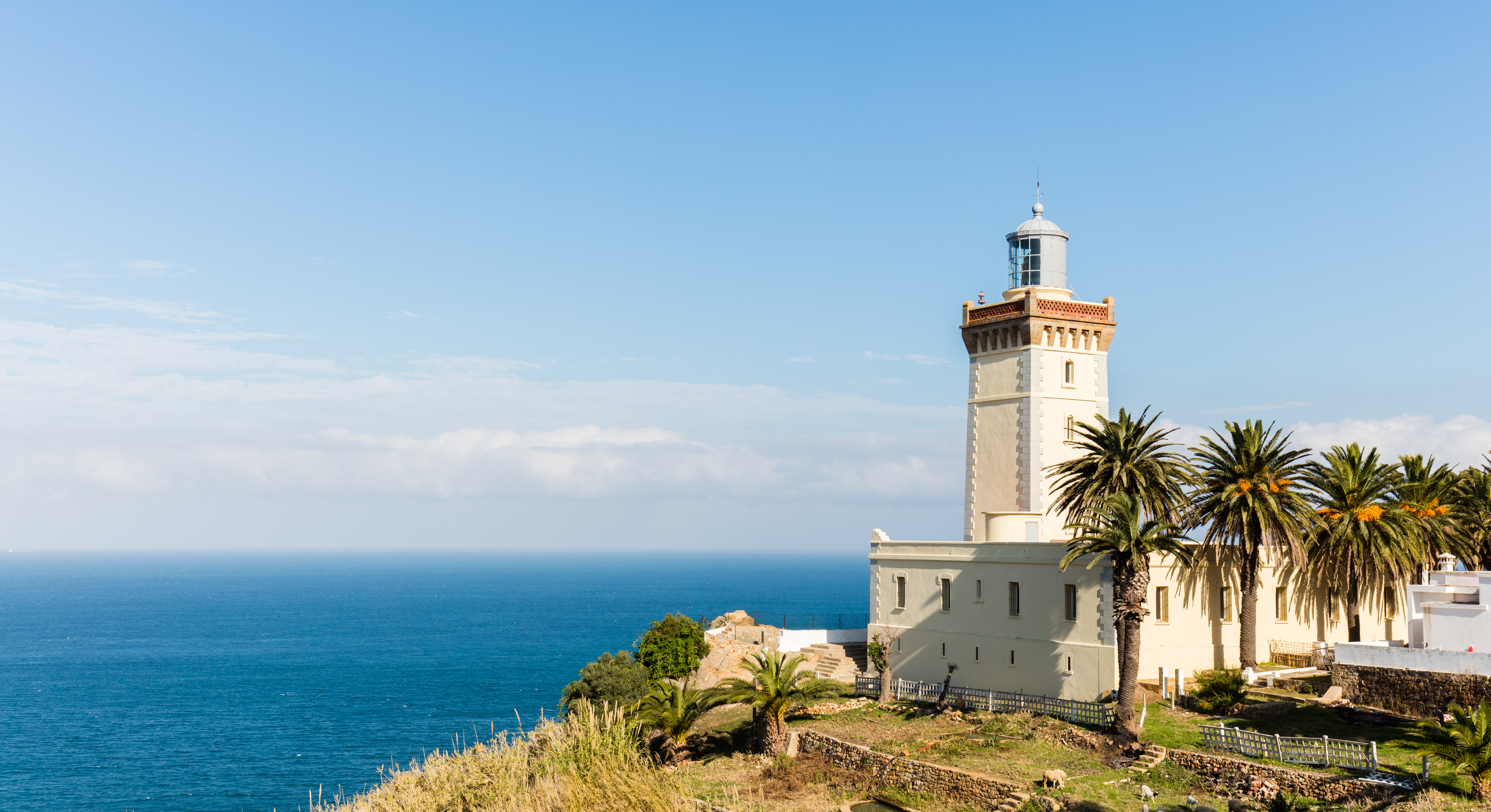
- Cape Spartel near Tangier
- Interactive map of Tangier-Assilah Prefecture
- Country: Morocco
- Region: Tanger-Tetouan-Al Hoceima
- Seat: Tangier

Area
  - Total: 1,055 km^{2} (407 sq mi)

Population (2024)
  - Total: 1,494,413
  - Density: 1,417/km^{2} (3,669/sq mi)

Tangier-Assilah Prefecture is a highly urbanised administrative subdivision of Morocco. Formerly part of the Tanger-Tetouan region, it has belonged since the 2015 territorial reform to the Tanger-Tetouan-Al Hoceima region. Its capital is Tangier.

Located in the northern part of the country along the Atlantic Ocean coast, it had a population of 1,494,413 in 2024.

== Geography ==
Located in the extreme northwestern part of Morocco, Tangier-Assilah Prefecture is bordered to the north by the Strait of Gibraltar and the Mediterranean Sea, and to the west by the Atlantic Ocean. It is bounded to the south by Larache Province and to the east by Fahs-Anjra Province.

The territory is highly urbanized around the city of Tangier, a major economic and port hub, while the surrounding areas retain a more rural character.

== History ==
The territory of present-day Tangier-Assilah Prefecture has a long history linked to its strategic position at the junction of the Mediterranean Sea and the Atlantic Ocean.

The region has been inhabited since antiquity by various civilizations, including Phoenician, Carthaginian, and Roman, as evidenced by nearby archaeological sites. It later formed part of successive political entities that ruled Morocco during the medieval and modern periods.

The cities of Tangier and Assilah have historically played an important role in trade and cultural exchanges due to their maritime position and their location on routes linking Europe and Africa.

== Administrative divisions ==
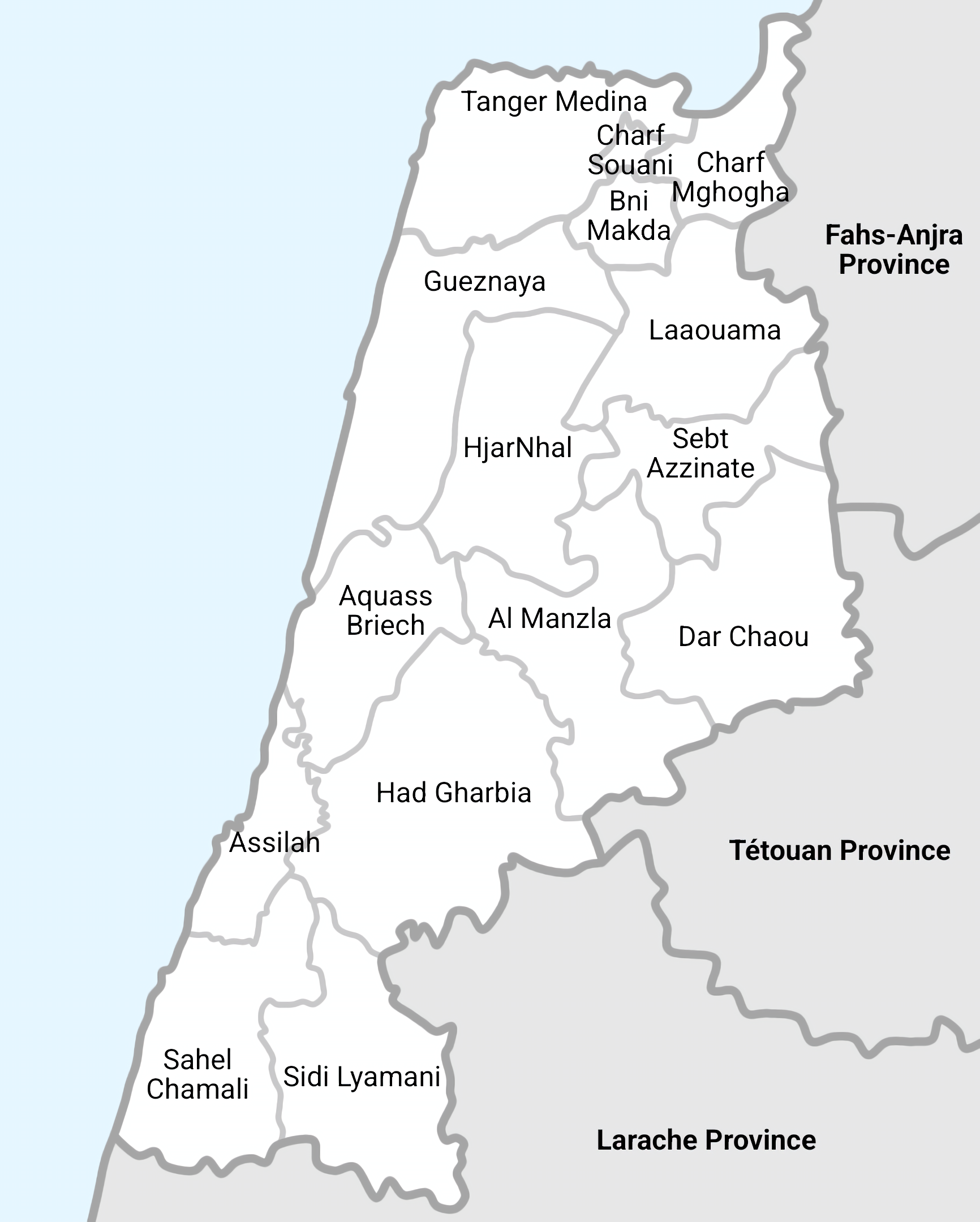
Communes of Tangier-Assilah Prefecture

According to the administrative division established in 2008 and amended in 2009, the prefecture is composed of twelve communes.

It includes three urban municipalities: Tangier, Assilah, and Gueznaia, as well as nine rural communes grouped within the circle of Assilah:

- caïdat of Boukhalef: Hjar Ennhal;
- caïdat of Dar Chaoui: Dar Chaoui and Al Manzla;
- caïdat of Laaouama: Laaouama and Sebt Azzinate;
- caïdat of Gharbia: Aquouass Briech and Had Al Gharbia;
- caïdat of Sidi Lyamani: Sahel Chamali and Sidi Lyamani.

Four localities are considered cities: the municipalities of Tangier and Assilah, as well as the urban centers of the rural communes of Dar Chaoui and Sidi Lyamani.

The municipality of Tangier is subdivided into four arrondissements: Bni Makada, Charf-Mghogha, Charf-Souani, and Tangier-Medina.

== Demography ==
Municipality	Population in 1994	Population in 2004
Tangier	494,234	669,685
Asilah	24,496	28,217
Boukhalef	18,735	18,699
Zirara	13,361	15,033
Chbanate	11,522	10,618
Bir Taleb	11,047	11,252
