= Oulad Ben Hammadi =

Oulad Ben Hammadi اولاد بن حمادي Awlad Ben Hammadi
- Rural commune and town
- Location within Morocco
- Coordinates: 34.2004°N 5.8298°W
- Country: Morocco
- Region: Rabat-Salé-Kénitra
- Province: Sidi Slimane

Population (2004)
  - Total: 12,100
- Time zone: UTC+0 (GMT)

Oulad Ben Hammadi is a small town and rural commune in Sidi Slimane Province, Rabat-Salé-Kénitra, Morocco. At the time of the 2004 census, the commune had a total population of 12,100 people living in 1,828 households.

== Geography ==
Oulad Ben Hammadi is located at the eastern edge of Sidi Slimane Province adjacent to Sidi Kacem to the east. It is due east of the municipality of Sidi Slimane and northeast of Dar Bel Amri.
