= UFO sightings in Africa =

List of alleged UFO sightings

This is a list of alleged sightings of unidentified flying objects (UFO) in Africa.

== Algeria ==
- During the Algerian War (1954–1962), many UFO sightings were reported around conflict zones.
- A 1973 article recounted the claims of a soldier who alleged that fifteen years earlier, he witnessed an elliptical craft of a width of about 250–350 metres (820–1,150 ft) with a greenish light surrounding it and a denser beam shining directly down from the centre. Its presence was preceded by a whistling sound, which attracted the soldier's attention. It descended and hovered silently for about 40–50 minutes, after which it rose slowly and flew away at a very significant speed.
- In March 1975, several UFOs were reported near military facilities, some of which ostensibly appeared on radar .

== Botswana ==
- On 14 May 2008, two witnesses who were satellite gazing noticed a triangular UFO near the horizon in Gaberone. It reportedly made manoeuvres inconsistent with known aircraft.
- On 25 June 2016, a white, pulsating ovoid was witnessed in the Okavango Delta in North-West Botswana. Its appearance reportedly correlated with a notable ambient silence.

== Morocco ==
- On 12 July 1952, two elongated flying saucers were reported by policemen at night above Had Kourt. The following day, at 11:45 pm, inhabitants of Fedala spotted a bluish-green, ball-shaped object flying at high speed and leaving a trail of light. The day after, at 9:00 am, a couple claimed to observe another flying saucer for about 30 seconds.

== Senegal ==
- On 3 July 1952, a flying saucer was spotted above Dakar. The saucer was described as flat and tapered, traveling southbound at a significant velocity, and surrounded by flames. Eyewitnesses clarified that stars were not visible by the time of the reported sighting, which was at 6:08 am.

== Sudan ==
- In January 2018, a UFO was spotted in the skies over Khartoum that the military has identified as a potential satellite (possibly the failed US satellite Zuma according to one scientist), even though it admitted to not being able to clearly identify the flying object.

== Tunisia ==
- In July 1969, several observers reported two UFOs in the sky of Tunis. The first was a full moon-sized, greenish-blue object. The second was starlike and reportedly exploded, forming a greenish circular cloud. US embassy officials were reportedly among the witnesses.

== Zimbabwe ==
- On 14 September 1994, 62 children from a school in Ruwa witnessed the landing of a large ship and many smaller ones near their school. The children described the beings who stepped out of the ships as having "large heads, two holes for nostrils, a slit for a mouth or no mouth at all, and long black hair, and were dressed in dark, single-piece suits". The American psychiatrist John E. Mack interviewed a number of the children involved in the incident and concluded it was likely not an incident of mass hysteria, as 12 of the children had given consistent accounts of the event. Mack stated that the interviews also revealed a consistent "impression [given by the children that] some form of sentient life cared about the Earth and cared about the environment and even cared about the children.”

== See also ==
- UFO sightings in South Africa
- List of UFO sightings

== Bibliography ==
- Cynthia Hind, Ufos Over Africa. Horus House Pr. 1997. ISBN 978-1-881852-15-5
- Jann Halexander, The ufo issue in Central Africa (Gabon, Congo, Democratic Republic of Congo). Purple Shadow Agency. 2024. ISBN 979-8-8761-6969-3
