= Kceibya =

Kceibya القصيبية Algosaibah
- Rural commune and town
- Location within Morocco
- Coordinates: 34°17′36″N 6°9′34″W
- Country: Morocco
- Region: Rabat-Salé-Kénitra
- Province: Sidi Slimane

Population (2004)
  - Total: 23,218
- Time zone: UTC+0 (GMT)

Kceibya is a small town and rural commune in Sidi Slimane Province, Rabat-Salé-Kénitra, Morocco. At the time of the 2004 census, the commune had a total population of 23,218 people living in 3,295 households. It lies along the road from Sidi Yahya El Gharb to Sidi Slimane.
