= Morocco–Vietnam relations =

Moroccan–Vietnamese relations
- Morocco: Vietnam

Envoy
- Ambassador of Vietnam to Morocco Lê Kim Quy: Ambassador of Morocco to Vietnam Jamale Chouaibi

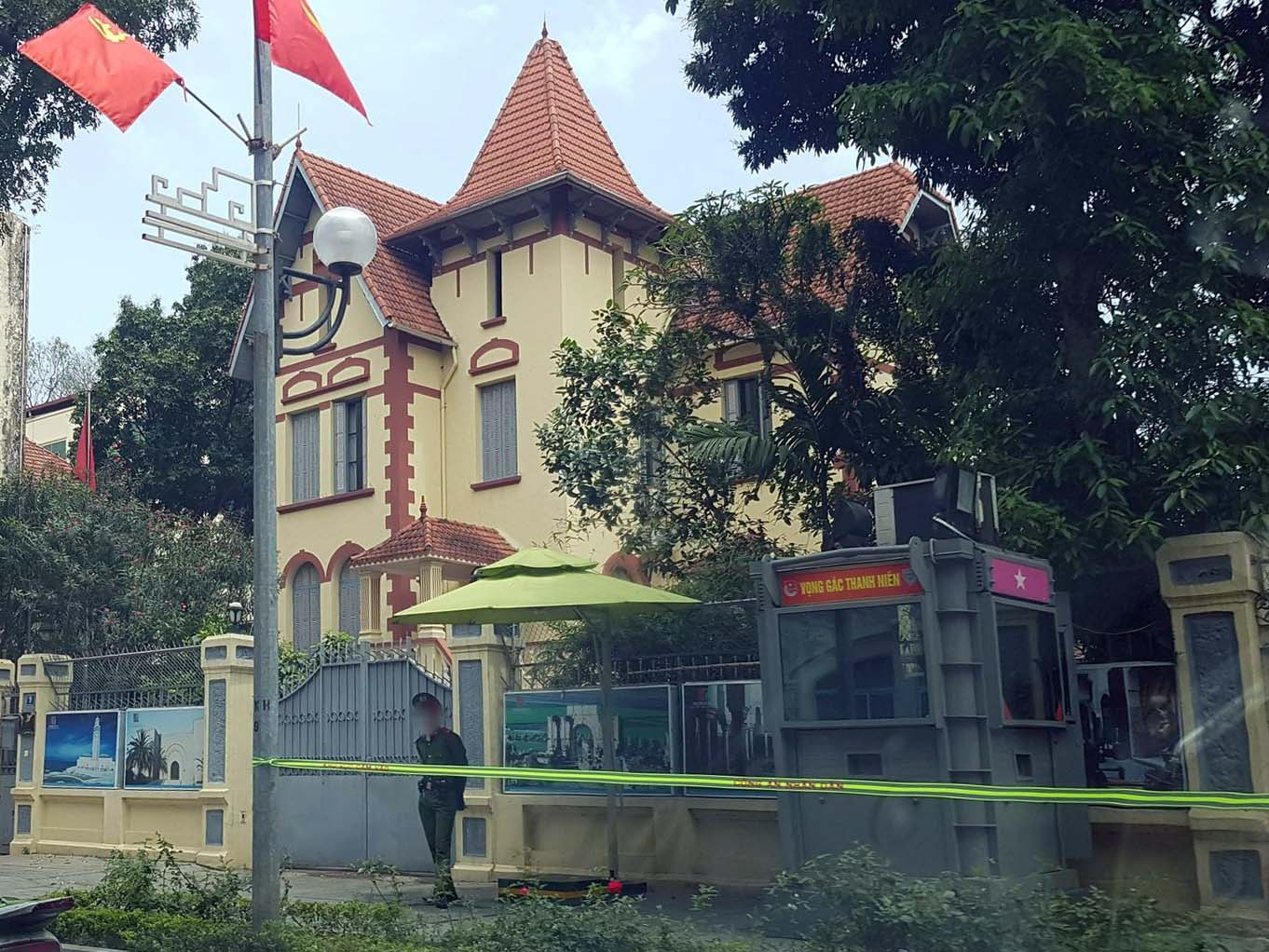
Embassy of Kingdom of Morocco in Vietnam

Morocco and Vietnam established official relations on March 27, 1961. Morocco has an embassy in Hanoi while Vietnam has an embassy in Rabat.

Both countries have a shared history as a colony of France. Both countries are members of the Non-Aligned Movement and Group of 77.

== History ==
In the 1940s, Vietnamese seafarers settled in Morocco. Among those was Eric Vo Toan, architect of the Mausoleum of Mohammed V.

During the First Indochina War, France sent over 120,000 soldiers from its North African territories to fight against the Japanese and Viet Minh. The soldiers were often threatened or persuaded under false pretenses to join the army, where they would serve as cannon fodder. The Viet Minh targeted Moroccan soldiers to defect, with support from Moroccan resistance leader Abd el-Krim. Viet Minh leader Ho Chi Minh also sought help from Moroccan communist leader Mohamed Ben Aomar Lahrech to integrate Moroccan defectors from the French side in the Viet Minh army. After the war, France barred the defectors from returning home, and many settled intermarrying with local Viet women in the village of Ba Vì, near Hanoi. A Moroccan style gate remains as a landmark in Ba Vi.

In 1972, during the Vietnam War, Moroccan King Hassan II signed a degree to allow the defectors to return to Morocco. Considering the harsh conditions in wartime Vietnam, many of the Moroccans and their families took this chance. Seven of them settles in a village near Sidi Yahya El Gharb, which became nicknamed the 'Chinese village'. Nowadays Vietnamese-Moroccans are concentrated in Kenitra.

In 2004, Vietnamese PM Phan Văn Khải paid an official visit to Vietnam.

In 2005, chairwoman of Vietnam's National Assembly Nguyễn Văn An visited Morocco.

In 2008, Moroccan PM Abbas El Fassi visited Vietnam. Vietnam and Morocco signed visa exemptions and trade and investment agreements during those visits.

In 2019, chairwoman of Vietnam's National Assembly Nguyễn Thị Kim Ngân visited Moroccan capital Rabat.

== See also ==
- Foreign relations of Morocco
- Foreign relations of Vietnam
