= Aïn Beïda =

Aïn Beïda may refer to several places and jurisdictions in Northern Africa :

In Algeria

- Aïn Beïda, Oum El Bouaghi, a municipality or commune in Oum El Bouaghi province
- Ain Beida, Ouargla, a municipality or commune in Ouargla Province
- Aïn Beïda, Bouira, a municipality or commune in Bouïra Province
- Aïn Beïda, Aïn Témouchent, a municipality or commune in Aïn Témouchent Province
- Aïn Beïda, Oran, a municipality or commune in Oran Province

Other

- Ain Beida, Ouezzane, a municipality or commune in Ouezzane Province, Morocco
- Aïn-Beida, Tunisia, near Ancient Tambeae and modern Henchir-Baboucha

== See also ==
- Aïn Ben Beida, Algeria
