= Ajellidine =

- Location within Morocco
- Coordinates: 34°39′0″N 5°12′36″W
- Country: Morocco
- Region: Tanger-Tetouan-Al Hoceima
- Province: Ouezzane
- Time zone: UTC+0 (GMT)

Ajellidine is a village in Ouezzane Province in north-central Morocco. It lies to the northwest of the Al Wahda Dam and its reservoir.
