= Tekna (disambiguation) =

The Tekna is a Sahrawi tribal confederation in southern Morocco and parts of northern Western Sahara.

Tekna may also refer to:

- Tekna (Norway), a union for graduate technical and scientific professionals in Norway
- Tekna, Morocco, a rural commune and town in Sidi Kacem Province, Morocco

== See also ==
- Tekna Teaching And Konkoor News Agency, a daily newspaper published in Iran
- Tecna, the Fairy of Technology in Winx Club
