= Al Wahda Dam =

- Al Wahda Dam (Morocco);
- Al-Wehda Dam in Syria and Jordan.
