= Sidi Ameur Al Hadi =

- Rural commune and town
- Interactive map of Sidi Ameur Al Hadi
- Country: Morocco
- Region: Rabat-Salé-Kénitra
- Province: Sidi Kacem

Population (2004)
  - Total: 11,868
- Time zone: UTC+0 (GMT)

Sidi Ameur Al Hadi is a small town and rural commune in Sidi Kacem Province of the Rabat-Salé-Kénitra region of Morocco. At the time of the 2004 census, the commune had a total population of 11868 people living in 1866 households.
