= Rmilat =

- Rural commune and town
- Interactive map of Rmilat
- Country: Morocco
- Region: Rabat-Salé-Kénitra
- Province: Sidi Kacem

Population (2004)
  - Total: 15,307
- Time zone: UTC+0 (GMT)

Rmilat or Ermilate is a small town and rural commune in Sidi Kacem Province of the Rabat-Salé-Kénitra region of Morocco. At the time of the 2004 census, the commune had a total population of 15,307 people living in 2121 households.
