= Nouirate =

- Rural commune and town
- Interactive map of Nouirate
- Coordinates: 34°34′05″N 5°53′35″W
- Country: Morocco
- Region: Rabat-Salé-Kénitra
- Province: Sidi Kacem

Population (2004)
  - Total: 22,639
- Time zone: UTC+0 (GMT)

Nouirate is a small town and rural commune in Sidi Kacem Province of the Rabat-Salé-Kénitra region of Morocco. At the time of the 2004 census, the commune had a total population of 22,639 people living in 3707 households.
