= Sidi Redouane =

Coordinates: 34°41′N 5°27′W

- Rural commune and town
- Location within Morocco
- Country: Morocco
- Region: Tanger-Tetouan-Al Hoceima
- Province: Ouezzane

Population (2004)
  - Total: 20,782
- Time zone: UTC+0 (GMT)

Sidi Redouane is a small town and rural commune in Ouezzane Province of the Tanger-Tetouan-Al Hoceïma region of Morocco. At the time of the 2004 census, the commune had a total population of 20,782 people living in 4116 households.
