= Azghar =

Azghar أزغار Ozgar
- Rural commune and town
- Location within Morocco
- Coordinates: 34.1858°N 5.8957°W
- Country: Morocco
- Region: Rabat-Salé-Kénitra
- Province: Sidi Slimane

Population (2004)
  - Total: 9,972
- Time zone: UTC+0 (GMT)

Azghar is a small town and rural commune in Sidi Slimane Province, Rabat-Salé-Kénitra, Morocco. At the time of the 2004 census, the commune had a total population of 9,972 people living in 1,475 households.
