= Sidi Ahmed Benaissa =

Sidi Ahmed Benaissa سيدي أحمد بنعيسى
- Rural commune and town
- Interactive map of Sidi Ahmed Benaissa
- Country: Morocco
- Region: Rabat-Salé-Kénitra
- Province: Sidi Kacem

Population (2004)
  - Total: 8,901
- Time zone: UTC+0 (GMT)

Sidi Ahmed Benaissa is a small town and rural commune in Sidi Kacem Province of the Rabat-Salé-Kénitra region of Morocco. At the time of the 2004 census, the commune had a total population of 8901 people living in 1358 households.
