= Lamjaara =

- Rural commune and town
- Location within Morocco Location within Africa
- Coordinates: 34.6147°N 5.2887°W
- Country: Morocco
- Region: Tanger-Tetouan-Al Hoceima
- Province: Ouezzane

Population (2004)
  - Total: 16,899
- Time zone: UTC+0 (GMT)

Lamjaara is a small town and rural commune in Ouezzane Province of the Tanger-Tetouan-Al Hoceima region of Morocco. At the time of the 2004 census, the commune had a total population of 16,899 people living in 3053 households.

== See also ==
- Ajellidine
