= Oulad Nouel =

Oulad Nouel أولاد نوال
- Rural commune and town
- Interactive map of Oulad Nouel
- Coordinates: 34°29′38″N 5°42′42″W
- Country: Morocco
- Region: Rabat-Salé-Kénitra
- Province: Sidi Kacem

Population (2004)
  - Total: 11,076
- Time zone: UTC+0 (GMT)

Oulad Nouel is a small town and rural commune in Sidi Kacem Province of the Rabat-Salé-Kénitra region of Morocco. At the time of the 2004 census, the commune had a total population of 11,076 people living in 1755 households.
