= Bni Oual =

Bni Oual بني وال
- Rural commune and town
- Location within Morocco
- Country: Morocco
- Region: Rabat-Salé-Kénitra
- Province: Sidi Kacem

Population (2004)
  - Total: 8,480
- Time zone: UTC+0 (GMT)

Bni Oual is a small town and rural commune in Sidi Kacem Province, Rabat-Salé-Kénitra, Morocco. At the time of the 2004 census, the commune had a total population of 8480 people living in 1328 households.
