= Mzefroune =

- Rural commune and town
- Location within Morocco Location within Africa
- Coordinates: 34.8423°N 5.6841°W
- Country: Morocco
- Region: Tanger-Tetouan-Al Hoceima
- Province: Ouezzane

Population (2004)
  - Total: 8,110
- Time zone: UTC+0 (GMT)

Mzefroune is a small town and rural commune in Ouezzane Province of the Tanger-Tetouan-Al Hoceima region of Morocco. At the time of the 2004 census, the commune had a total population of 8110 people living in 1665 households.
