= Sidi Azzouz =

Coordinates: 31°46′N 7°40′W

Sidi Azzouz سيدي عزوز
- Rural commune and town
- Interactive map of Sidi Azzouz
- Country: Morocco
- Region: Rabat-Salé-Kénitra
- Province: Sidi Kacem

Population (2004)
  - Total: 16,001
- Time zone: UTC+0 (GMT)

Sidi Azzouz is a small town and rural commune in Sidi Kacem Province of the Rabat-Salé-Kénitra region of Morocco. At the time of the 2004 census, the commune had a total population of 16,001 people living in 2470 households.
