= Sidi Bousber =

Coordinates: 34°34′N 5°22′W

- Rural commune and town
- Location within Morocco
- Country: Morocco
- Region: Tanger-Tetouan-Al Hoceima
- Province: Ouezzane

Population (2004)
  - Total: 11,260
- Time zone: UTC+0 (GMT)

Sidi Bousber is a small town and rural commune in Ouezzane Province of the Tanger-Tetouan-Al Hoceima region of Morocco. At the time of the 2004 census, the commune had a total population of 11,260 people living in 2191 households.
