= Al Wahda Dam (Morocco) =

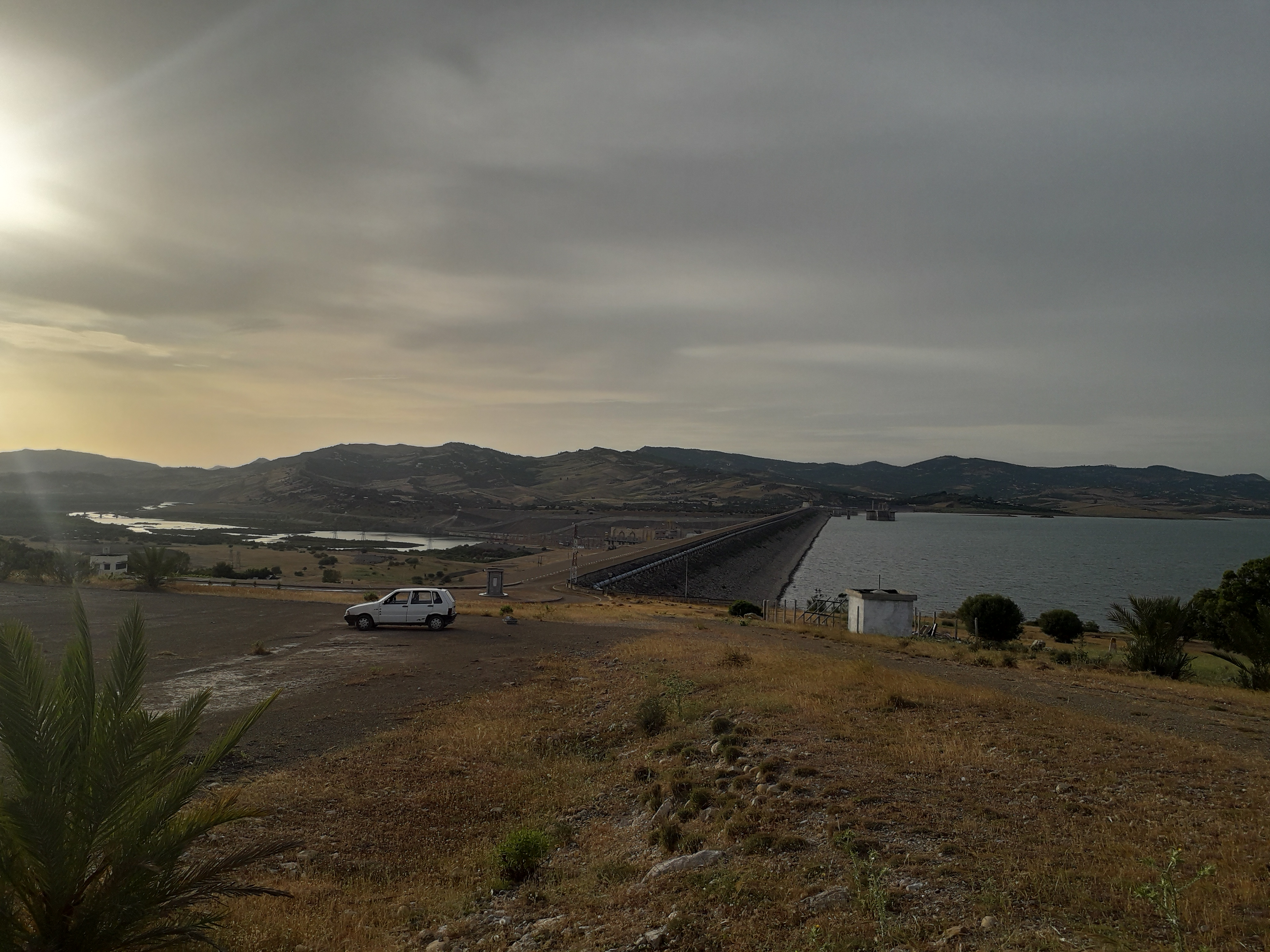
- View of the Dam and the Ouergha river
- Interactive map of Al Wahda Dam
- Official name: Barrage Al Wahda
- Location: M´Jaara, Ouezzane Province, Morocco
- Coordinates: 34°35′54″N 5°11′51″W
- Construction began: 1991
- Opening date: 1997

Dam and spillways
- Impounds: Ouergha River
- Height: 88 m (289 ft)
- Length: 2,600 m (8,500 ft)
- Dam volume: 28×10^{6} m^{3} (990×10^{6} cu ft)
- Spillway type: Service, controlled chute
- Spillway capacity: 13,000 m^{3}/s (460,000 cu ft/s)

Reservoir
- Creates: Al Wahda Reservoir
- Total capacity: 3,800×10^{6} m^{3} (3,100,000 acre⋅ft)
- Catchment area: 6,200 km^{2} (2,400 sq mi)
- Surface area: 123 km^{2} (47 sq mi)

Power Station
- Commission date: 1997-1998
- Turbines: 3 x 80 MW (110,000 hp) Francis-type
- Installed capacity: 240 MW (320,000 hp)
- Annual generation: 400 GWh (1,400 TJ)

Al Wahda Dam, formerly known as M'Jaara Dam, is an embankment dam on the Ouergha River between the Lamjaara and Zghira communes in Ouezzane Province, Morocco. It was constructed for flood control, irrigation, water supply and hydroelectric power production. It is the second largest dam in north Africa and the largest in Morocco. It was described by Land Ocean Interactions in the Coastal Zone (LOICZ) as "the second most important dam in Africa after the High Aswan dam."

== Background ==
In 1988, the Board of Water and Climate considered the dam and eventually it was recommended for development. Construction began in 1991, the dam began to create its reservoir in 1996 and was inaugurated on March 20, 1997, by King Hassan II. A total of 14,000,000 m^{3} (490,000,000 ft^{3}) of material were excavated during construction.

== Specifications ==
The dam is an earthen embankment type made of 28,000,000 cubic metres (990,000,000 cu ft) of material and 720,000 cubic metres (25,000,000 cu ft) of concrete. It is 88 metres (289 ft) tall at its highest point and the main portion of the dam is 1,600 metres (5,200 ft) long. Directly to the north and adjacent to the spillway is a saddle dam that is 1,000 metres (3,300 ft) long and 30 metres (98 ft) high. The dam's spillway, in its center is controlled by six floodgates and has a discharge capacity in excess of 13,000 cubic metres per second (460,000 cu ft/s).

== Power plant ==
The power plant, at the dam's toe and adjacent to the spillway is supplied with water via a 10.8 metres (35 ft) diameter and 247 metres (810 ft) long pipe which in turn transfers the water into three penstocks. Each of which is 5.7 metres (19 ft) in diameter 60 metres (200 ft) in length. This scheme provides 62 metres (203 ft) of hydraulic head and up to 450 cubic metres per second (16,000 cu ft/s) to the Francis turbines. Each turbine powers an 80 megawatts (110,000 hp) generator for a total installed capacity of 240 megawatts (320,000 hp).

== Impacts ==
The dam has had a positive impact downstream by supplying water for drinking and irrigation. In addition, it has helped reduce floods in the Gharb region along the Ouergha and Sebou Rivers by 90%. It provides water for the potential irrigation of over 110,000 hectares (270,000 acres). Electricity produced by the dam's hydroelectric power station also alleviates the burning of 140,000 metric tons (140,000 long tons; 150,000 short tons) of fossil fuels a year along with serving peak energy demand. The dam's reservoir though has a high rate of siltation and it is estimated to lose 60 million cubic metres (2.1×10^{9} cu ft) of storage each year. The silt trapped in the reservoir also doesn't reach the coastal estuary which increases erosion along the coast.

== See also ==
- List of power stations in Morocco
