= Sfafaa =

- Rural commune and village
- Location within Morocco
- Coordinates: 34°15′0″N 6°9′36″W
- Country: Morocco
- Region: Rabat-Salé-Kénitra
- Province: Sidi Slimane

Population (2004)
  - Total: 18,799
- Time zone: UTC+0 (GMT)

Sfafaa is a village and rural commune in Sidi Slimane Province of the Rabat-Salé-Kénitra region of Morocco. At the time of the 2004 census, the commune had a total population of 18,799 people living in 2,808 households.
