= United States Naval Communications Station Sidi Yahya El Gharb =

Closed naval station in Morocco

- Sidi Yahya El Gharb, Morocco
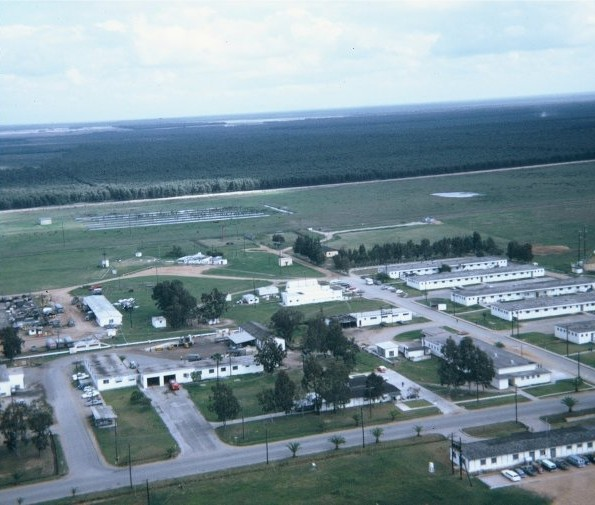

Site information
- Type: Army Barracks
- Owner: Royal Moroccan Air Force
- Controlled by: Morocco

Location
- Coordinates: 34°18′33″N 6°18′41″W

Site history
- Built: 1940
- Built by: Morocco
- In use: 1940-1976

United States Naval Communications Station Sidi Yahya El Gharb was a U.S. Naval communications station consisting of work facilities, supply, living facilities, and rest and recreation of the United States Navy located just outside of Sidi Yahya El Gharb, Morocco. It was a U.S. Navy installation connected to the Naval Air Station Port Lyautey in Kenitra, Morocco. The base was closed in 1976.

Following its closure in the mid-1970's, the base was returned to the government of the Kingdom of Morocco and was transformed into a military barracks serving Sidi Slimane Air Base by the Royal Moroccan Air Force. As of 2021, it continues to serve in that capacity.

== See also ==
- Sidi Slimane Air Base
