= Lamrabih =

- Rural commune and town
- Location within Morocco
- Country: Morocco
- Region: Rabat-Salé-Kénitra
- Province: Kénitra/Sidi kacem

Population (2004)
  - Total: 20,187
- Time zone: UTC+0 (GMT)

Lamrabih is a small village in the region of Rabat-Salé-Kénitra, Morocco. At the time of the 2004 census, the commune had a total population of 20,187 people.
