= Selfat =

- Rural commune and town
- Location within Morocco
- Coordinates: 34.2241°N 5.4755°W
- Country: Morocco
- Region: Rabat-Salé-Kénitra
- Province: Sidi Kacem

Population (2004)
  - Total: 9,686
- Time zone: UTC+0 (GMT)

Selfat is a small town and rural commune in Sidi Kacem Province of the Rabat-Salé-Kénitra region of Morocco. At the time of the 2004 census, the commune had a total population of 9686 people living in 1381 households.
