= Bni Makada =

Coordinates: 35.7511°N 5.8188°W

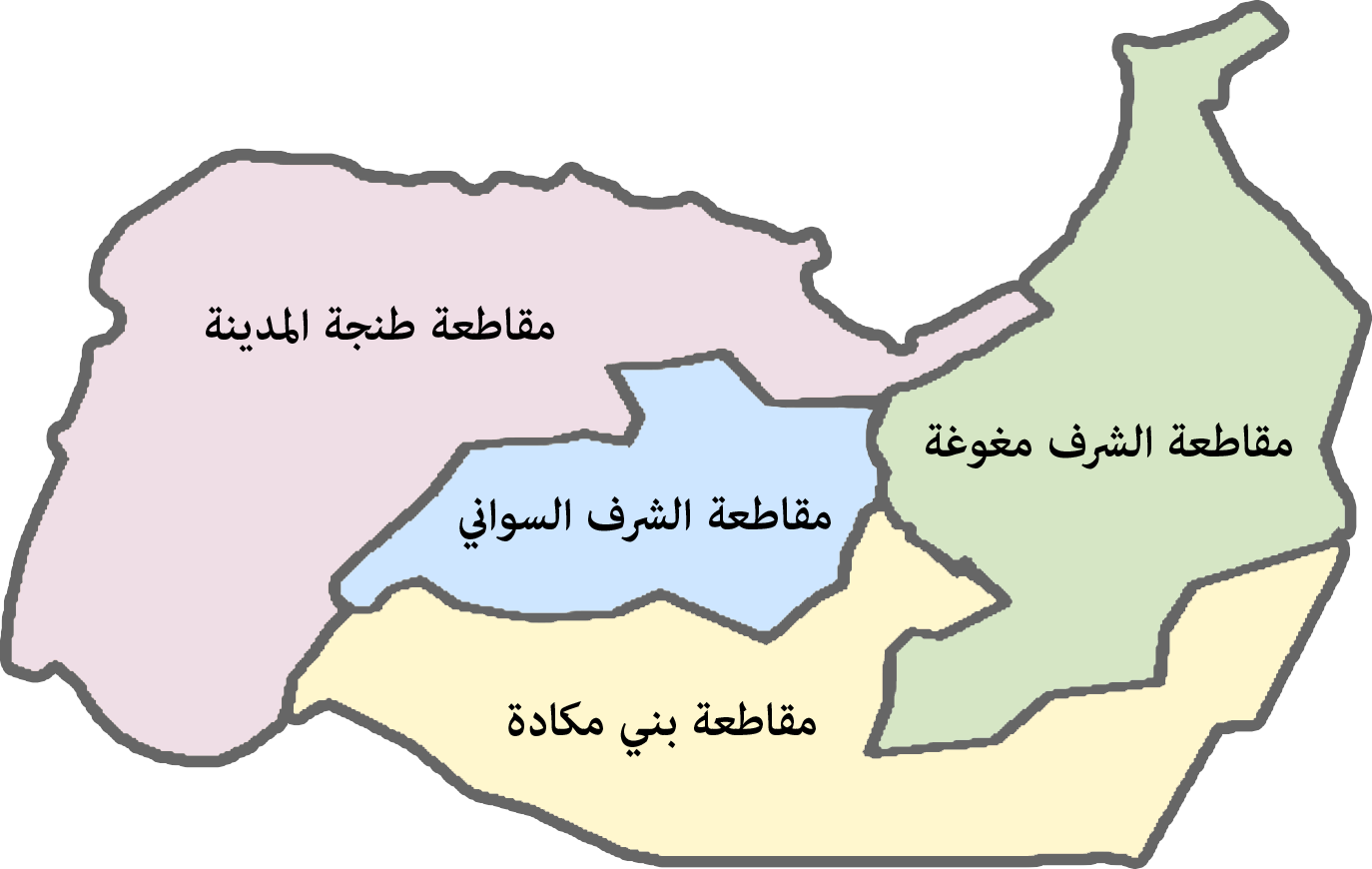
Bni Makada show in yellow

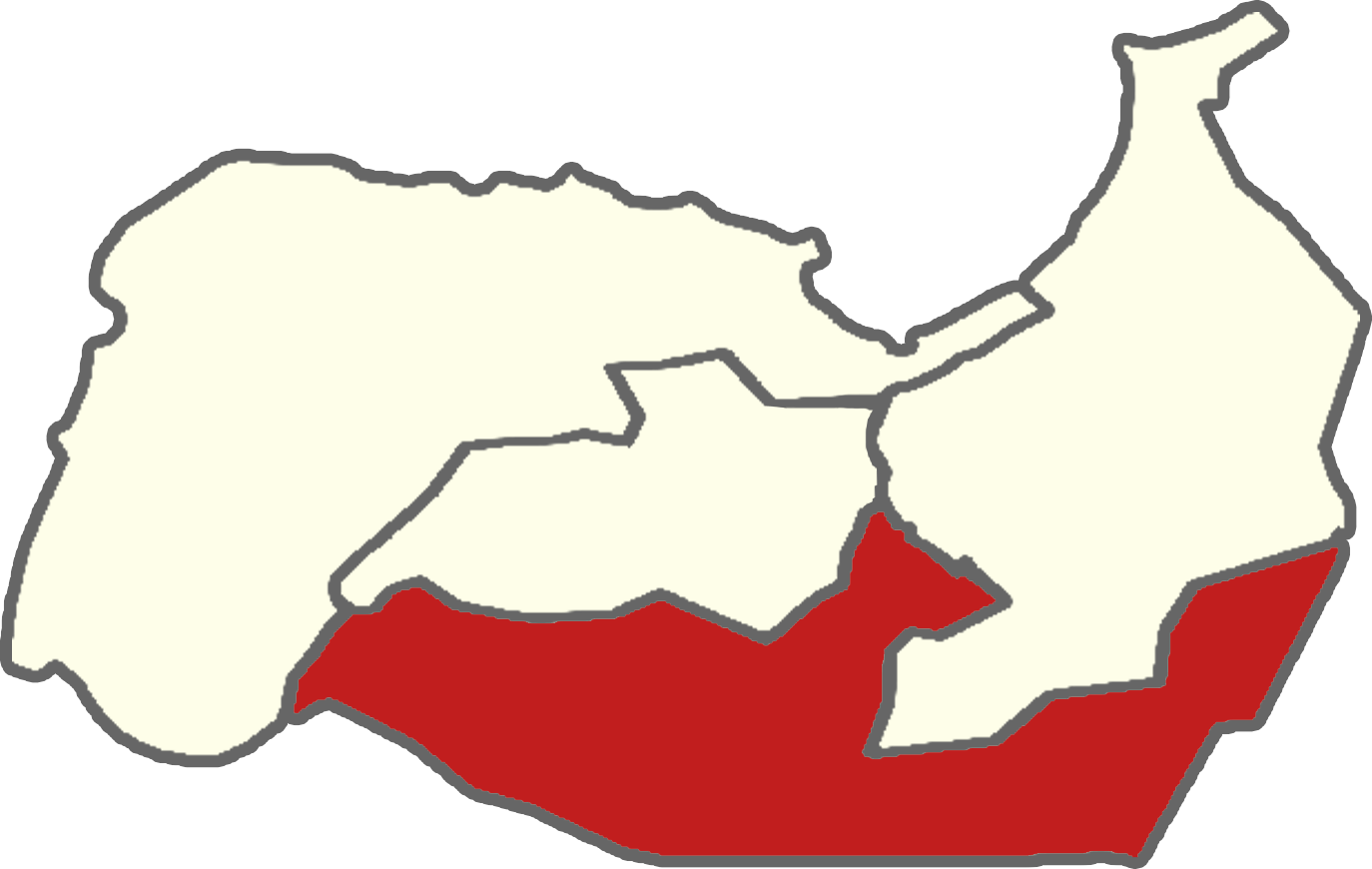

Bni Makada is one of the four arrondissements or districts of the city of Tangier, Morocco. Administratively it is part of the prefecture of Tangier-Assilah in the region of Tangier-Tetouan-Al Hoceima. The 2014 Moroccan census recorded a population of 386,191 people living in 91,737 households.

== Name ==
Bni Makada is named after a tribe of the Houara, who settled in the area in the late 17th century during the reign of Sultan Moulay Ismail ibn Sharif.
