= Ouezzane Province =

Province of Morocco

Ouezzane Province إقليم وزان ⵜⴰⵙⴳⴰ ⵏ ⵡⴰⵣⵣⴰⵏ
- Province
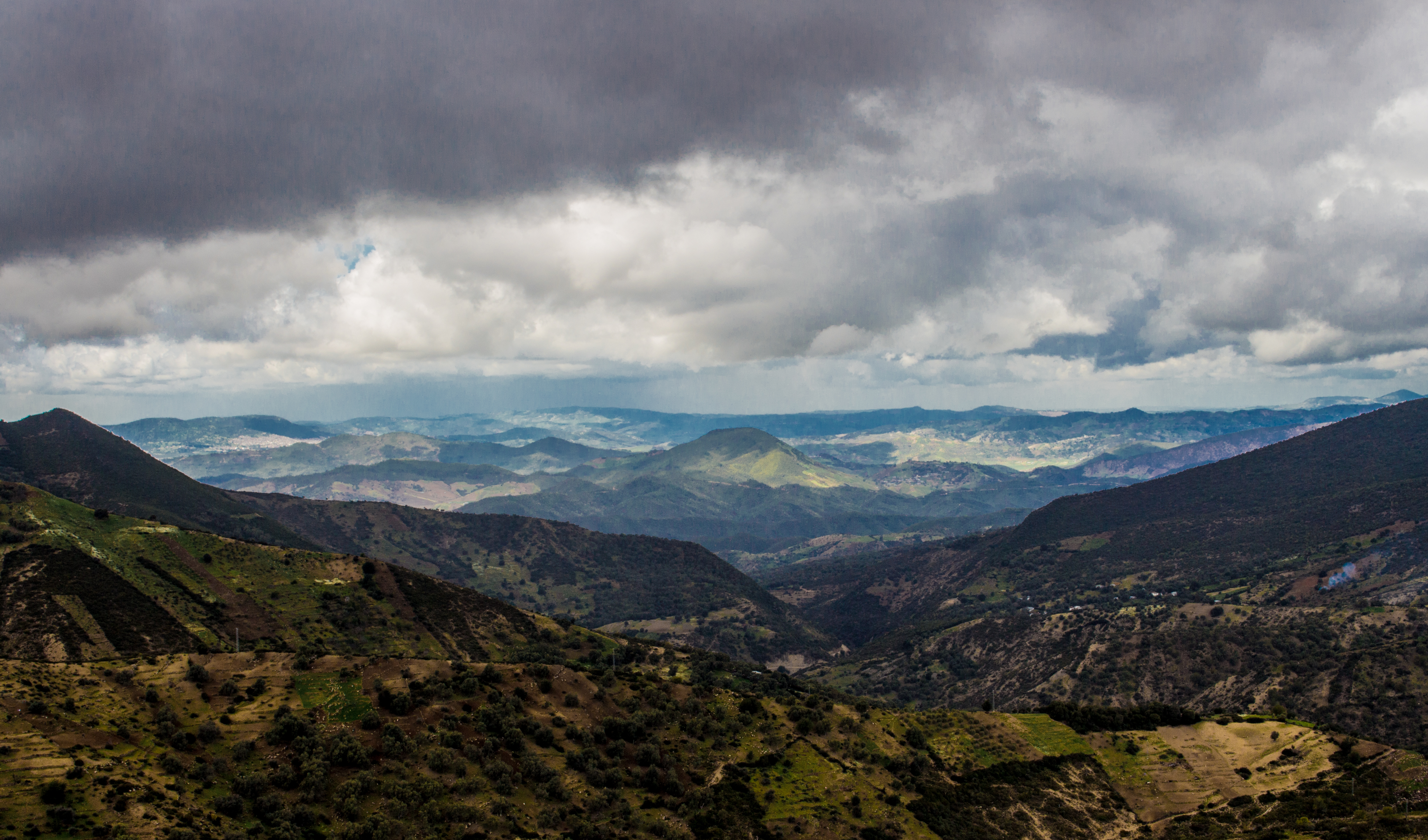
- Landscape of Ouezzane Province, view from Moqrisset

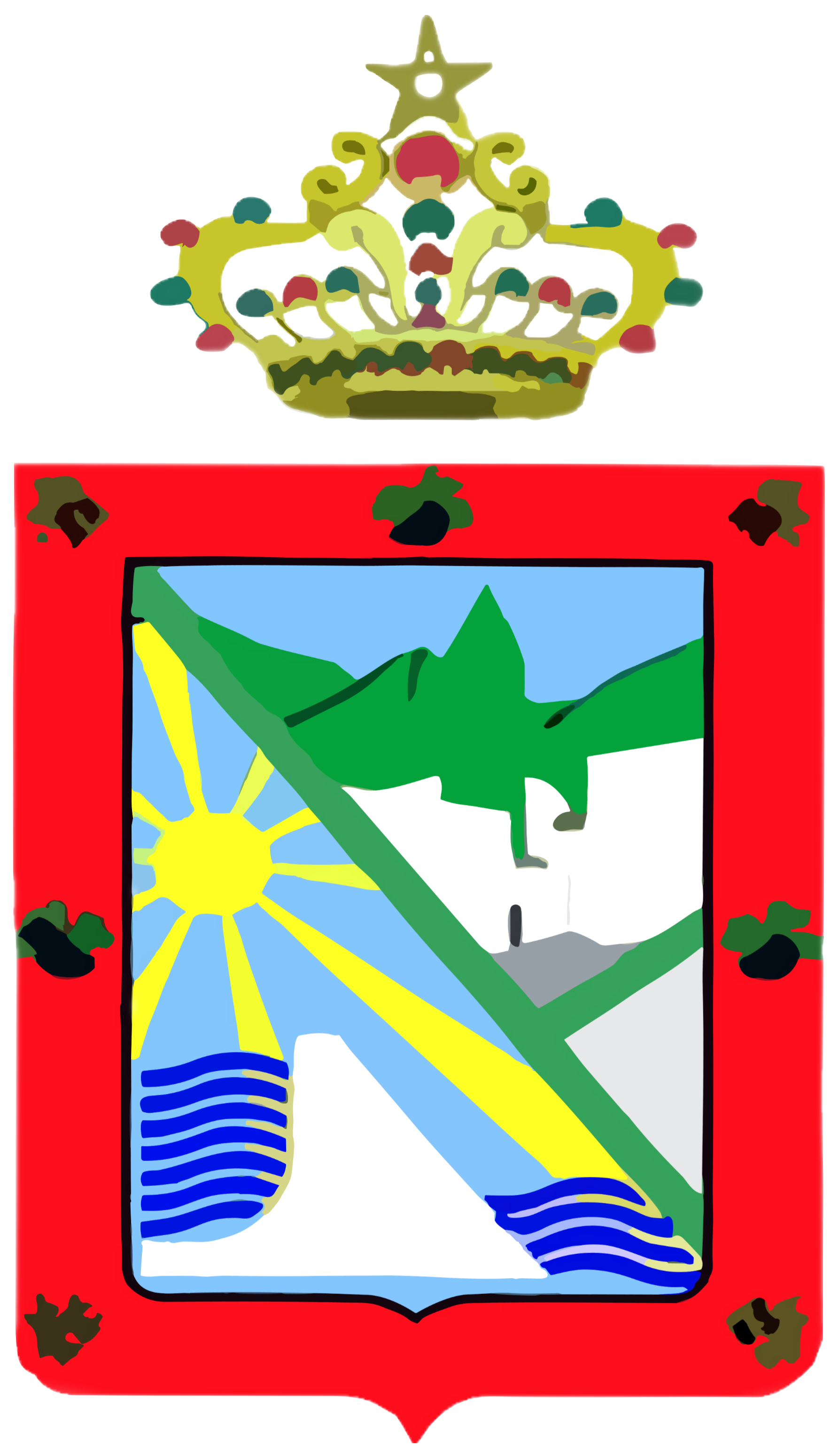
- Seal
- Interactive map of Ouezzane Province
- Country: Morocco
- Region: Tanger-Tetouan-Al Hoceima
- Seat: Ouezzane

Area
  - Total: 1,861.2 km^{2} (718.6 sq mi)

Population (2008 (estimate))
  - Total: 307,083

Ouezzane Province is a predominantly rural province in the Tanger-Tetouan-Al Hoceima region of northwestern Morocco. Its capital is Ouezzane.

== History ==
Ouezzane Province was created in 2009 as part of a territorial reorganization aimed at improving local governance and regional balance. It was formed from territories previously belonging mainly to Sidi Kacem Province (former Gharb-Chrarda-Beni Hssen region) and Chefchaouen Province (former Tanger-Tetouan region).

The city of Ouezzane, the provincial capital, has historically been an important religious and cultural center, notably due to the presence of the Ouazzania zawiya, founded in the 17th century.

== Geography ==
Ouezzane Province is located in northwestern Morocco, within the Tanger-Tetouan-Al Hoceima region. It lies in a transitional zone between the western Rif mountains and the plains of the Gharb.

It is bordered by:

- Chefchaouen Province to the north;
- Taounate Province to the east;
- Sidi Kacem Province to the south;
- Larache Province to the west.

The landscape is characterized by hills and Rif mountain ranges interspersed with fertile valleys. The climate is Mediterranean, with relatively wet winters and hot, dry summers.

The local economy is primarily based on agriculture, including olive cultivation, cereal farming, and livestock breeding.

== Administrative divisions ==
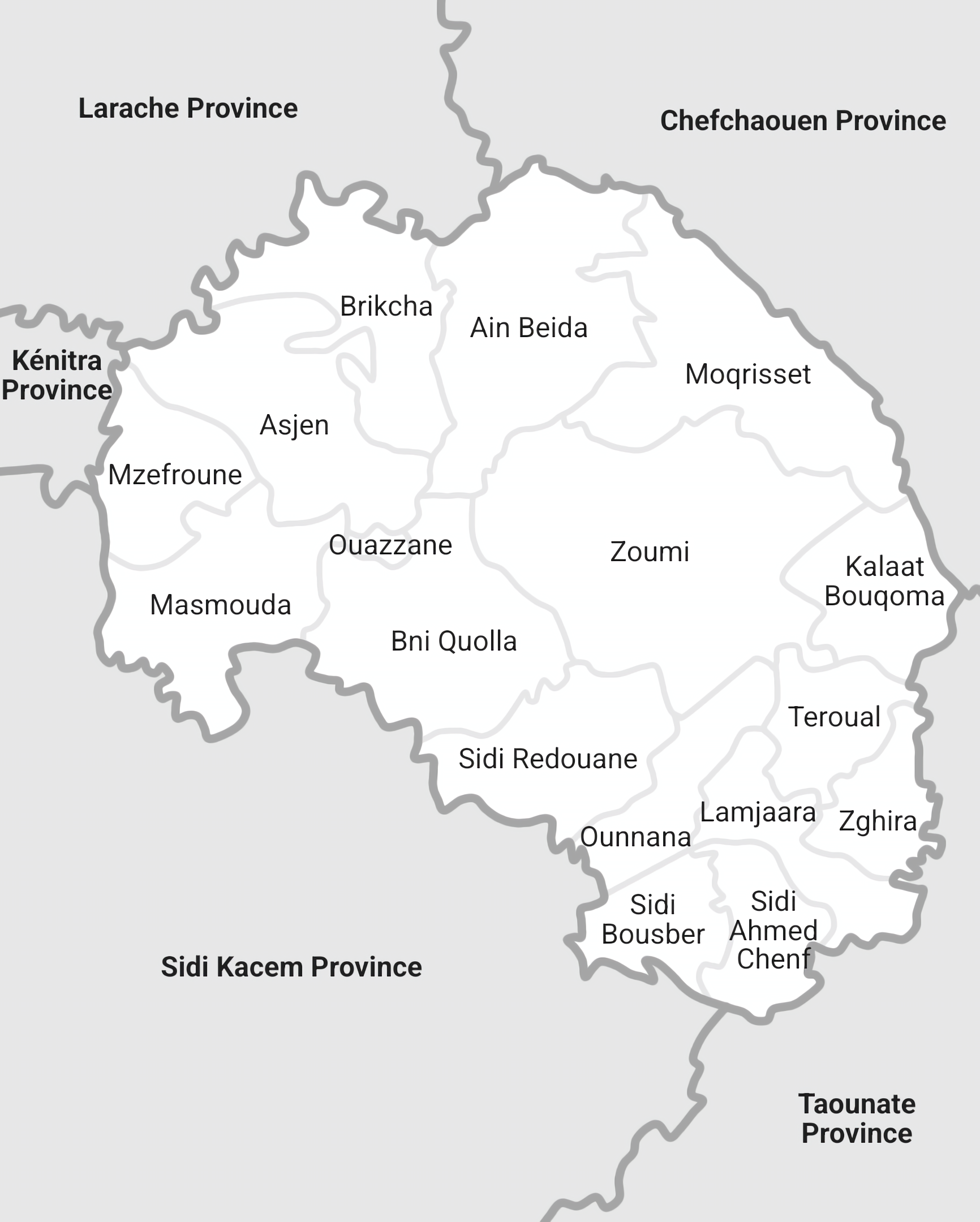
Communes of Ouezzane Province

Ouezzane Province is composed of 17 communes, formed from territories previously belonging to Sidi Kacem Province and Chefchaouen Province.

It includes:

- one urban commune (municipality): Ouezzane, the provincial capital;
- sixteen rural communes: Ain Beida, Asjen, Bni Quolla, Brichka, Imzoufren, Kalaat Bouqorra, Lamjaara, Masmouda, Mokrisset, Ounnana, Sidi Ahmed Cherif, Sibi Bousber, Sidi Redouane, Teroual, Zghira, and Zoumi.

== Demography ==
The province is divided administratively into the following municipalities and communes:

Name	Geographic code	Type	Households	Population (2004)	Foreign population	Moroccan population	Notes
Ouezzane	481.01.09.	Municipality	12594	57,972	183	274,577	The capital of the Province of Ouezzane and Central Hub
Bni Quolla	481.07.01.	Rural commune	3328	17512	6	17506	
Lamjaara	481.07.03.	Rural commune	3053	16899	0	16899	2321 residents live in the center, called Ain Dorij; 14578 residents live in rural areas.
Masmouda	481.07.05.	Rural commune	3352	17126	5	17121	
Mzefroune	481.07.07.	Rural commune	1665	8110	2	8108	
Ounnana	481.07.09.	Rural commune	2316	13627	0	13627	
Sidi Ahmed Cherif	481.07.11.	Rural commune	1845	10413	0	10413	
Sidi Bousber	481.07.13.	Rural commune	2191	11260	0	11260	
Sidi Redouane	481.07.15.	Rural commune	4116	20782	0	20782	
Teroual	481.07.17.	Rural commune	2484	13046	0	13046	
Zghira	481.07.19.	Rural commune	2867	16070	0	16070	
Ain Beida	151.09.01.	Rural commune	2193	11851	0	11851	
Asjen	151.09.03.	Rural commune	2497	13113	0	13113	
Brikcha	151.09.05.	Rural commune	2192	10999	0	10999	1510 residents live in the center, called Brikcha; 9489 residents live in rural areas.
Kalaat Bouqorra	151.09.07.	Rural commune	2846	15165	0	15165	
Moqrisset	151.09.09.	Rural commune	2135	10864	1	10863	1680 residents live in the center, called Moqrisset; 9184 residents live in rural areas.
Zoumi	151.09.11.	Rural commune	7743	39719	1	39718	3830 residents live in the center, called Zoumi; 35889 residents live in rural areas.
