= Zoumi =

Coordinates: 34°48′N 5°21′W

- rural commune and town
- Interactive map of Zoumi
- Country: Morocco
- Region: Tanger-Tetouan-Al Hoceima
- Province: Ouezzane

Population (2004)
  - Total: 3,830
- Time zone: UTC+0 (GMT)

Zoumi is a rural commune and town in Ouezzane Province, Tanger-Tetouan-Al Hoceima, Morocco. According to the 2004 census it has a population of 3,830.
