= Moulay Abdelkader =

Moulay Abdelkader مولاي عبد القادر
- Rural commune and town
- Location within Morocco
- Coordinates: 34.6422°N 5.7678°W
- Country: Morocco
- Region: Rabat-Salé-Kénitra
- Province: Sidi Kacem

Population (2004)
  - Total: 8,871
- Time zone: UTC+0 (GMT)

Moulay Abdelkader is a small town and rural commune in Sidi Kacem Province, Rabat-Salé-Kénitra, Morocco. As of the 2014 census, the commune had a total population of 8,871 people living in 1,338 households.
