= Sefsaf =

Coordinates: 34.55806°N 6.00778°W

- Rural commune and town
- Location within Morocco
- Country: Morocco
- Region: Rabat-Salé-Kénitra
- Province: Sidi Kacem

Population (2004)
  - Total: 22,941
- Time zone: UTC+0 (GMT)

Sefsaf is a small town and rural commune in Sidi Kacem Province of the Rabat-Salé-Kénitra region of Morocco. At the time of the 2004 census, the commune had a total population of 22,941 people living in 3090 households.
