= Boumaiz =

Boumaiz بومعيز Boumaaz
- Rural commune and town
- Location within Morocco
- Coordinates: 34.2925°N 5.9350°W
- Country: Morocco
- Region: Rabat-Salé-Kénitra
- Province: Sidi Slimane

Population (2004)
  - Total: 20,419
- Time zone: UTC+0 (GMT)

Boumaiz is a small town and rural commune in Sidi Slimane Province, Rabat-Salé-Kénitra, Morocco. At the time of the 2004 census, the commune had a population of 20,419 people living in 3,520 households.
