= Asjen =

Coordinates: 34°51′N 5°37′W

- Rural commune and town
- Interactive map of Asjen
- Country: Morocco
- Region: Tanger-Tetouan-Al Hoceima
- Province: Ouezzane

Population (2004)
  - Total: 13,113
- Time zone: UTC+0 (GMT)

Asjen is a small town and rural commune in Ouezzane Province of the Tanger-Tetouan-Al Hoceima region of Morocco. At the time of the 2004 census, the commune had a total population of 13,113 people living in 2,497 households. The town's postcode is 91024.
