= Ain Dorij =

Coordinates: 34°37′N 5°17′W

- Town
- Interactive map of Ain Dorij
- Country: Morocco
- Region: Tanger-Tetouan-Al Hoceima
- Province: Ouezzane

Population (2004)
  - Total: 2,321
- Time zone: UTC+0 (GMT)

Ain Dorij is a town in Ouezzane Province, Tanger-Tetouan-Al Hoceima, Morocco. At the 2004 census, its population was 2,321.
