= Sidi Slimane Province =

Sidi Slimane Province إقليم سيدي سليمان ⵜⴰⵙⴳⴰ ⵏ ⵙⵉⴷⵉ ⵙⵍⵉⵎⴰⵏ
- Province
- Provincial prefecture building in Sidi Slimane
- Interactive map of Sidi Slimane Province
- Country: Morocco
- Region: Rabat-Salé-Kénitra
- Seat: Sidi Slimane

Government
  - governor: Abdelmajid El Kyak (As of 2016

Area
  - Total: 1,492 km^{2} (576 sq mi)

Population (2004)
  - Total: 292,877
- Time zone: UTC+0 (GMT)

Sidi Slimane Province is an administrative subdivision of Morocco, located in the Rabat-Salé-Kénitra region. Its capital is the city of Sidi Slimane.

The major cities are:

- Sidi Slimane
- Sidi Yahia el Gharb

== History ==
Sidi Slimane Province was established in 2009 by Decree No. 2-09-319 of 11 June, following the division of Kenitra Province.

The creation of the province formed part of a broader administrative reorganization aimed at improving territorial management and bringing public services closer to local populations.

Since the 2015 territorial reform, the province has been part of the Rabat-Salé-Kénitra region.

== Geography ==
Sidi Slimane Province covers an area of approximately 1,492 square kilometres (576 sq mi) and is located in the Gharb Plain, one of Morocco’s most fertile agricultural regions.

It is bordered:

- to the north and east by Sidi Kacem Province (Rabat-Salé-Kénitra);
- to the southeast by Meknès Prefecture (Fès-Meknès);
- to the south by Khemisset Province (Rabat-Salé-Kénitra);
- to the west by Kenitra Province (Rabat-Salé-Kénitra).

The terrain is predominantly flat, consisting of alluvial plains favorable to agriculture. The province lies within the basin of the Sebou River, whose tributaries support irrigation.

The climate is Mediterranean with Atlantic influence, characterized by mild, relatively wet winters and hot, dry summers.

Agriculture is the dominant activity, with cereal crops, legumes, and market gardening forming the backbone of the local economy.

== Administration ==
=== Administrative divisions ===
According to the 2009 administrative division, Sidi Slimane Province is composed of 11 communes, including two urban municipalities:

- Sidi Slimane (capital)
- Sidi Yahya El Gharb

The remaining nine rural communes are grouped into five caïdats within a single circle:

- caïdat of Boumaiz: Oulad Ben Hammadi, Boumaiz;
- caïdat of Kceibya: Sfafaa, Kceibya;
- caïdat of Dar Bel Amri: Azghar, Dar Bel Amri;
- caïdat of M’saada: M'Saada, Oulad H'Cine;
- caïdat of Ameur Chamalia: Ameur Chamalia.

None of the rural communes has an officially recognized urban center. The only localities classified as towns are Sidi Slimane and Sidi Yahya El Gharb.

== Demographics ==
According to the General Population and Housing Census, the population of Sidi Slimane Province was:

- 292,877 inhabitants in 2004;
- 322,451 inhabitants in 2014.

The population is predominantly rural, distributed between the two main urban centers and several rural communes. This reflects the province’s strong agricultural character.
