= Moqrisset =

Coordinates: 34°54′36″N 5°21′13″W

Moqrisset ⵎⵓⵇⵔⵉⵙⴰⵜ مقريصات Mokrisset
- rural commune and town
- Interactive map of Moqrisset
- Country: Morocco
- Region: Tanger-Tetouan-Al Hoceima
- Province: Ouezzane

Population (2004)
  - Total: 1,680
- Time zone: UTC+0 (GMT)

Moqrisset or Mokrisset is a rural commune and town in Ouezzane Province, Tanger-Tetouan-Al Hoceima, Morocco. According to the 2004 census it has a population of 1,680.
