= Bab Tiouka =

Bab Tiouka باب تيوكة
- Rural commune and town
- Location within Morocco
- Coordinates: 34.2440°N 5.6630°W
- Country: Morocco
- Region: Rabat-Salé-Kénitra
- Province: Sidi Kacem

Population (2004)
  - Total: 2,042
- Time zone: UTC+0 (GMT)

Bab Tiouka (Arabic: باب تيوكة) is a small town and rural commune in Sidi Kacem Province of the Rabat-Salé-Kénitra region of Morocco. At the time of the 2004 census, the commune had a total population of 2,042 people living in 1,212 households.
