= Kalaat Bouqorra =

- Rural commune and town
- Interactive map of Kalaat Bouqorra
- Coordinates: 34.749°N 5.19818°W
- Country: Morocco
- Region: Tanger-Tetouan-Al Hoceima
- Province: Ouezzane

Population (2004)
  - Total: 15,165
- Time zone: UTC+0 (GMT)

Kalaat Bouqorra is a small town and rural commune in Ouezzane Province of the Tanger-Tetouan-Al Hoceima region of Morocco. At the time of the 2004 census, the commune had a total population of 15165 people living in 2846 households.
