= Sidi Ahmed Cherif =

Sidi Ahmed Cherif سيدي أحمد الشريف
- Rural commune and town
- Interactive map of Sidi Ahmed Cherif
- Coordinates: 34.549058°N 5.276634°W
- Country: Morocco
- Region: Tanger-Tetouan-Al Hoceima
- Province: Ouezzane

Population (2024)
  - Total: 7,913
- Time zone: UTC+0 (GMT)
- Postal code: 16032

Sidi Ahmed Cherif is a small town and rural commune in Ouezzane Province of the Tanger-Tetouan-Al Hoceima region of Morocco. At the time of the 2024 Moroccan census, the commune had a total population of 7,913 people living in 2,171 households.

== Demographics ==
According to the 2024 census, the population of Sidi Ahmed Cherif comprises 3,861 males and 4,052 females. The commune is entirely rural with no urban areas reported in the census.

=== Age distribution ===
- 25.7% of the population is under 15 years old (27.6% of males, 23.9% of females)
- 54.8% of the population is between 15 and 59 years old (53.5% of males, 56% of females)
- 19.5% of the population is 60 years or older (18.9% of males, 20.1% of females)

=== Marital status ===
Among the population aged 15 and over:

- 27.2% are single (35% of males, 20.2% of females)
- 62.5% are married (62.8% of males, 62.3% of females)
- 2.1% are divorced (1.2% of males, 2.9% of females)
- 8.1% are widowed (1% of males, 14.6% of females)

The average age at first marriage is 28.4 years overall, with significant gender differences: 33.6 years for males and 23.8 years for females.

=== Fertility ===
The total fertility rate is 2.52 children per woman, with women aged 45-49 having an average of 3.6 children.

=== Health ===
The disability prevalence rate is 7.7% across all demographic groups.

=== Language ===
Arabic is the mother tongue for 100% of the population. Among those aged 10 and above who are literate:

- 49.2% can read and write only Arabic
- 37.9% can read and write Arabic and French
- 11.9% can read and write Arabic, French, and English

=== Education ===
- The illiteracy rate for those aged 10 and over is 43.6% (28.7% for males, 57.4% for females)
- The school enrollment rate for children aged 6-11 during the 2023-2024 school year was 97.5% (96.6% for boys, 98.4% for girls)

Educational attainment levels:

- 46.4% have no formal education (35.5% of males, 56.7% of females)
- 1.9% have preschool education
- 24.8% have primary education
- 14.9% have middle school education
- 7.9% have high school education
- 4.2% have higher education

=== Economic activity ===
- The activity rate for those aged 15 and over is 28.1% (55.5% for males, 3.2% for females)
- The unemployment rate is 23.8% (23.5% for males, 29.3% for females)

Among employed individuals aged 15 and over:

- 1.2% are employers
- 25.3% are self-employed
- 56.3% are salaried employees
- 1.6% are family helpers
- 0.3% are apprentices
- 5.7% are associates or partners

== Housing ==
The average household size is 3.6 persons. Housing characteristics:

- 90.8% of dwellings are rural-type housing
- 8.6% are traditional Moroccan houses
- 0.2% are basic houses
- There are no villas or apartments reported

Housing conditions:

- 93.2% of residents are homeowners
- Only 0.3% are renters
- 95.9% of homes have kitchens
- 96.1% have toilets
- 34.7% have bathrooms
- Only 5.6% have running water
- 95.9% have electricity
- Only 1% are connected to a public sewage system
- 21.9% use septic tanks

Housing age:

- 13.7% of homes are less than 10 years old
- 18.3% are between 10 and 19 years old
- 35.8% are between 20 and 49 years old
- 32.2% are 50 years or older

The average distance to the nearest paved road is 0.9 km.

== Economic establishments ==
As of 2024, there are 189 economic establishments in Sidi Ahmed Cherif:

- 140 public service establishments
- 2 non-profit associations operating in independent locations
- 47 for-profit establishments employing 49 people

The for-profit establishments are distributed across sectors:

- 2 in industry
- 0 in construction
- 36 in commerce
- 9 in services

Business size:

- 45 businesses have a single employee
- 2 businesses have 2-3 employees
- None have 4 or more employees

Most businesses are relatively new:

- None were established before 1981
- 3 were established between 1981-1990
- 3 were established between 1991-2000
- 13 were established between 2001-2010
- 20 were established between 2011-2019
- 8 were established in 2020 or later
