= Teroual =

Coordinates: 34°40′N 5°16′W

- Rural commune and town
- Location within Morocco
- Country: Morocco
- Region: Tanger-Tetouan-Al Hoceima
- Province: Ouezzane

Population (2004)
  - Total: 13,046
- Time zone: UTC+0 (GMT)

Teroual is a small town and rural commune in Ouezzane Province of the Tanger-Tetouan-Al Hoceima region of Morocco. At the time of the 2004 census, the commune had a total population of 13,046 people living in 2484 households.
