= Dar Gueddari =

Town in Rabat-Salé-Kénitra, Morocco

Coordinates: 34°25′N 6°05′W

Dar Gueddari دارالكداري
- Town
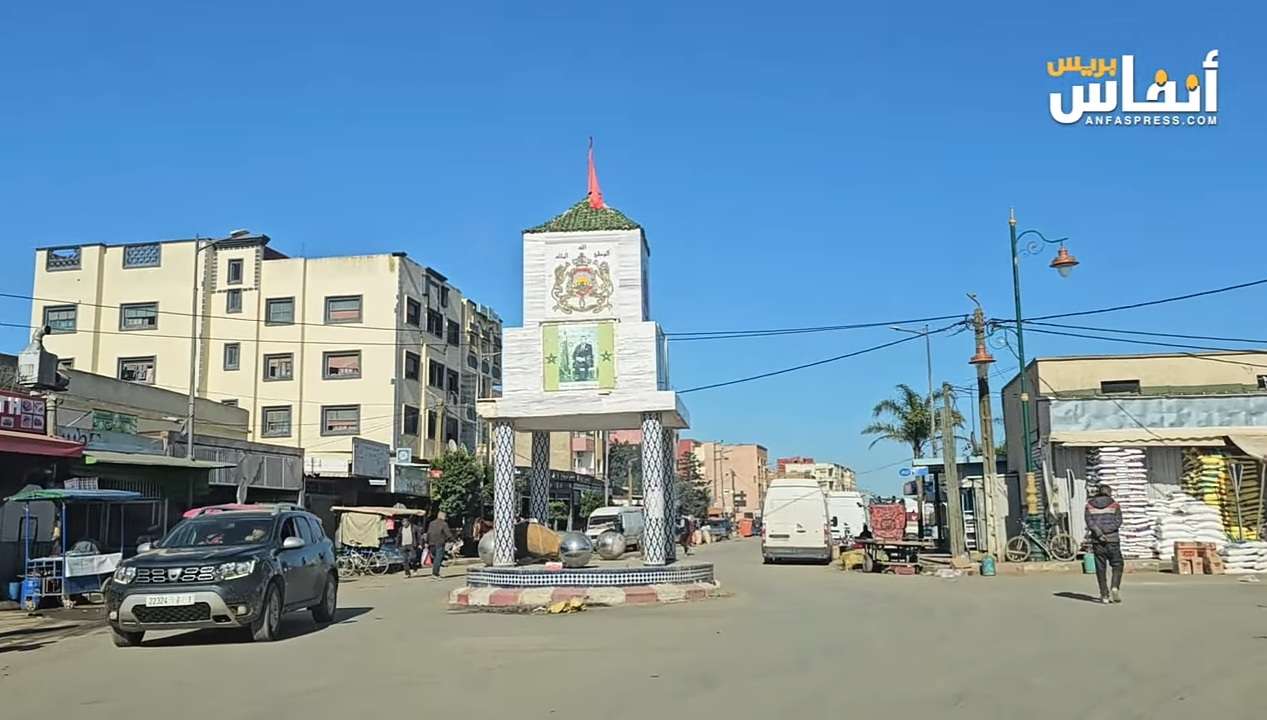
- Interactive map of Dar Gueddari
- City: Morocco
- Region: Rabat-Salé-Kénitra
- Province: Sidi Kacem

Population (2024)
  - Total: 7.826
- Time zone: UTC+0 (GMT)
- Postal code: 16010

Dar Gueddari is a town in Sidi Kacem Province, Rabat-Salé-Kénitra, Morocco.
