= Brikcha =

Coordinates: 34°58′N 5°35′W

- Town
- Interactive map of Brikcha
- Country: Morocco
- Region: Tanger-Tetouan-Al Hoceima
- Province: Ouezzane

Population (2004)
  - Total: 1,510
- Time zone: UTC+0 (GMT)

Brikcha is a town in Ouezzane Province, Tanger-Tetouan-Al Hoceima, Morocco. According to the 2004 census it has a population of 1,510.
