= Dar Bel Amri =

Dar Bel Amri دار بلعامري Dar Blamera
- Rural commune and town
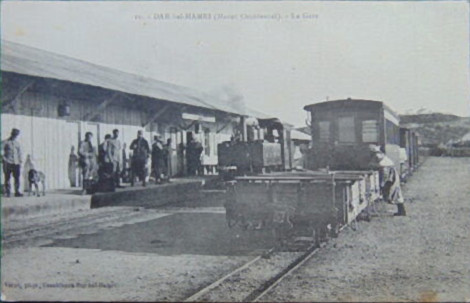
- Dar Bel Amri narrow gauge railway station

- Location within Morocco
- Coordinates: 34°11′20″N 5°58′11″W
- Country: Morocco
- Region: Rabat-Salé-Kénitra
- Province: Sidi Slimane

Population (2004)
  - Total: 31,453
- Time zone: UTC+0 (GMT)

Dar Bel Amri is a small town and rural commune in Sidi Slimane Province, Rabat-Salé-Kénitra, Morocco. At the time of the 2004 census, the commune had a total population of 31,453 people living in 5,086 households.
