= Zirara =

- Rural commune and town
- Location within Morocco Location within Africa
- Coordinates: 32°21′N 8°32′W
- Country: Morocco
- Region: Rabat-Salé-Kénitra
- Province: Sidi Kacem

Population (2004)
  - Total: 6,707
- Time zone: UTC+0 (GMT)

Zirara is a town in Sidi Kacem Province, Rabat-Salé-Kénitra, Morocco. At the 2004 census, its population was 6,707.
