= Laaouama =

Coordinates: 35°43′N 5°48′W

- Rural commune and town
- Interactive map of Laaouama
- Country: Morocco
- Region: Tanger-Tetouan-Al Hoceima
- Province: Fahs-Anjra

Population (2004)
  - Total: 20,541
- Time zone: UTC+0 (GMT)

Laaouama was a small town and rural commune in Fahs-Anjra Province of the Tanger-Tetouan-Al Hoceima region of Morocco. At the time of the 2004 census, the commune had a total population of 20,541 people living in 3834 households.

it has been merged and is now defunct.
