= Sidi M'Hamed Chelh =

Sidi M'Hamed Chelh سيدي امحمد الشلح
- Rural commune and town
- Interactive map of Sidi M'Hamed Chelh
- Coordinates: 34°30′09″N 5°46′21″W
- Country: Morocco
- Region: Rabat-Salé-Kénitra
- Province: Sidi Kacem

Population (2004)
  - Total: 7,382
- Time zone: UTC+0 (GMT)

Sidi M'Hamed Chelh is a small town and rural commune in Sidi Kacem Province of the Rabat-Salé-Kénitra region of Morocco. At the time of the 2004 census, the commune had a total population of 7382 people living in 1122 households.
