= Jorf El Melha =

Coordinates: 34°29′00″N 5°31′01″W

- Town
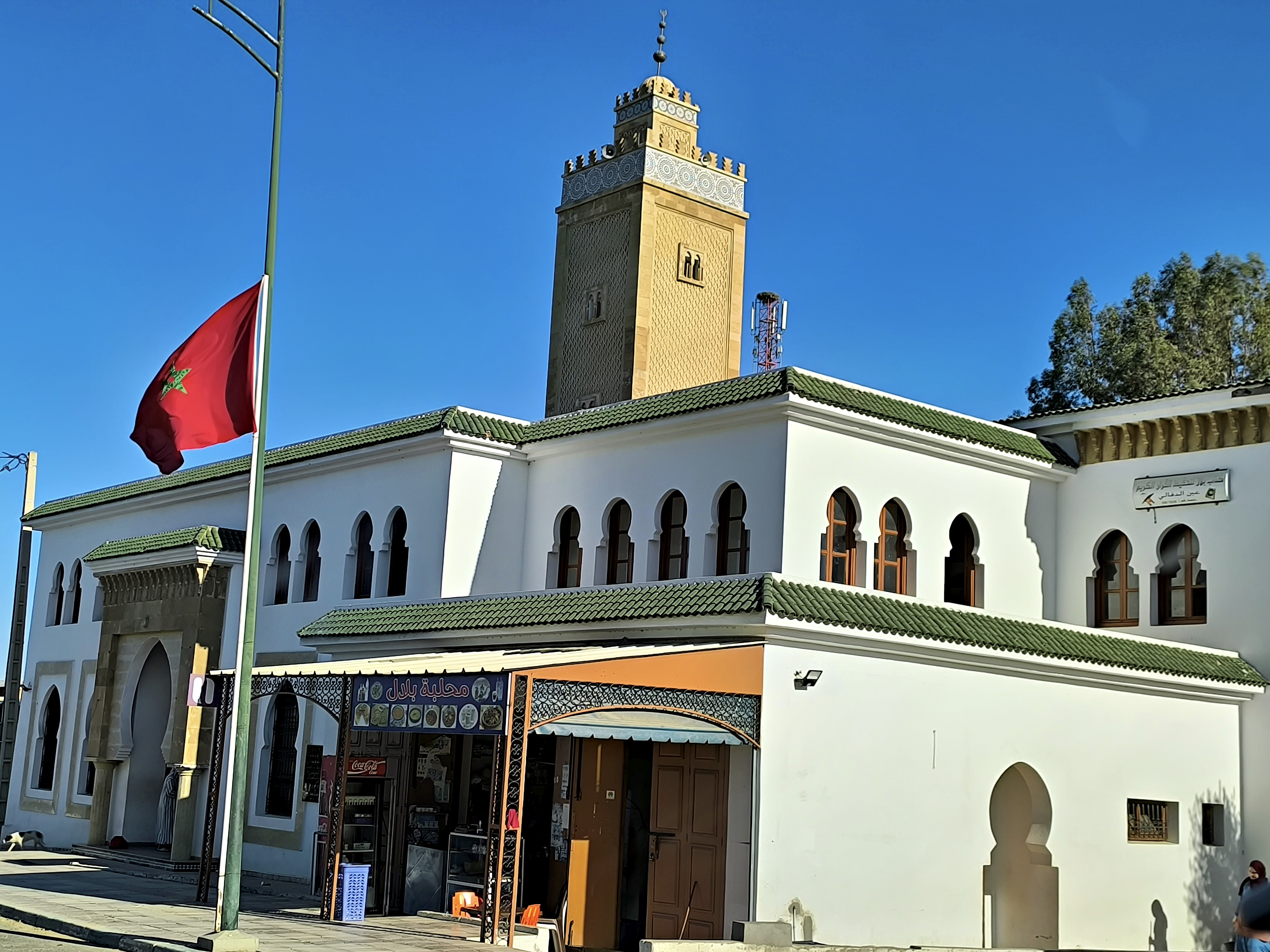
- A mosque in Jorf El Melha, 2024
- Interactive map of Jorf El Melha
- Country: Morocco
- Region: Rabat-Salé-Kénitra
- Province: Sidi Kacem
- Elevation: 115 ft (35 m)

Population (2004)
  - Total: 20,581
- Time zone: UTC+0 (GMT)

Jorf El Melha is a town in Sidi Kacem Province, Rabat-Salé-Kénitra, Morocco. According to the 2004 census, it has a population of 20,581. The climate in Jorf El Melha is mild and generally warm. The average annual temperature is 19.6°C. Winter is a rainier season than summer and the average annual precipitation is 619mm.
