= M'Saada =

M'Saada لمساعدة
- Rural commune and town
- Location within Morocco
- Coordinates: 34.3444°N 5.7888°W
- Country: Morocco
- Region: Rabat-Salé-Kénitra
- Province: Sidi Slimane

Population (2004)
  - Total: 18,879
- Time zone: UTC+0 (GMT)

M'Saada is a small town and rural commune in Sidi Slimane Province, Rabat-Salé-Kénitra, Morocco. At the time of the 2004 census, the commune had a total population of 18,879 people living in 2,837 households.
