= Zghira =

- Rural commune and town
- Location within Morocco Location within Africa
- Coordinates: 34.6369°N 5.2157°W
- Country: Morocco
- Region: Tanger-Tetouan-Al Hoceima
- Province: Ouezzane

Population (2004)
  - Total: 16,070
- Time zone: UTC+0 (GMT)

Zghira is a small town and rural commune in Ouezzane Province of the Tanger-Tetouan-Al Hoceima region of Morocco.

== Population ==
At the time of the 2004 census, the commune had a total population of 16,070 people living in 2867 households.
