= Zaggota =

- Rural commune and town
- Interactive map of Zaggota
- Coordinates: 34°10′N 5°32′W
- Country: Morocco
- Region: Rabat-Salé-Kénitra
- Province: Sidi Kacem

Population (2004)
  - Total: 9,526
- Time zone: UTC+0 (GMT)

Zaggota is a small town and rural commune in Sidi Kacem Province of the Rabat-Salé-Kénitra region of Morocco. At the time of the 2004 census, the commune had a total population of 9526 people living in 1456 households.
