= Al Haouafate =

Al Haouafate الحوافات
- Rural commune and town
- Location within Morocco
- Country: Morocco
- Region: Rabat-Salé-Kénitra
- Province: Sidi Kacem

Population (2004)
  - Total: 17,119
- Time zone: UTC+0 (GMT)

Al Haouafate is a small town and rural commune in Sidi Kacem Province of the Rabat-Salé-Kénitra region of Morocco. At the time of the 2004 census, the commune had a total population of 17,119 people living in 2627 households. The mayor is Abdenabi El Aidoudi.
