= UFO sightings in South Africa =

List of alleged UFO sightings

This is a list of alleged sightings of unidentified flying objects or UFOs in South Africa.

== 1914 phantom monoplanes ==
From 11 August to 9 September 1914, thousands of South Africans in various parts of the country observed what they believed to be a nighttime monoplane, or believed to observe its headlights, while in some cases the aerial vehicle performed sophisticated maneuvers. This was in the weeks leading up to the South West Africa campaign during the First World War, and many suspected a hostile German monoplane on a possible spy or bombing mission. However, these possibilities were discounted and the provenance of the plane remained unknown. Likewise its destination, landing or refueling places and the identity of its pilot remained unknown, causing some to examine it as a case of mass hysteria.

== 1970s sighting ==
- Bennie Smit, owner of Braeside farm near Fort Beaufort in the Eastern Cape, claimed that he as well as local police fired shots at an unknown object described as a fireball that changed color during the morning of 26 June 1971. Rumors circulated that the Grahamstown army regiment investigated the site but could not produce any records. The incident was publicized by international press. Local businesses capitalized on the notoriety with one tavern calling itself the "UFO Bar" featuring flying saucer murals and the local Savoy Hotel posting clippings of the stories on its walls. In a humorous editorial, the New Scientist stated the apartheid South African government was "very fastidious about the sort of immigrants she welcomes and little green men may very well be on the prohibited list".

== 1990s sightings ==
- On 10 June 1991 around 20:00 in the Cape Winelands travelling on the R44 past the location 33°53'15.1"S 18°51'02.2"E towards Stellenbosch eyewitness reports spotting a glowing red diamond shaped/ lozenge shaped object slowly drifting vertically towards the Southwest horizon and then disappearing behind the distant hills.
- Around July 1991 in Stellenbosch, Cape Winelands, at dusk a red glowing sphere is reported by two independent eyewitnesses drifting in the direction of Papegaaiberg from the South low on the horizon. It disappeared from site behind the hilltop. That Friday the local paper "Eikestad" published a third report describing a glowing sphere seen ascending vertically from Papegaaiberg before being lost from sight at around 3:00 the following morning. Papegaaiberg was still covered in dense pine plantations.
- On 7 April 1991, at 11:15 pm, a family at Baviaanspoort, Pretoria described a series of lights in the sky as a hovering triangular craft with red central light, and white star-like lights on each extremity. Similar lights were sighted in the nearby Eersterust township on the evenings of 8 and 9 April, either stationary or moving. These sightings occurred about a year after the Belgian UFO flap concluded. A decade later, similar lights described as a hovering triangular craft were reported by a family traveling in the Hartbeespoort area, about 50 km to the west.
- On 18 November 1993, at 10:15 pm, Messrs du Plessis and Venter, residents of Sasolburg, observed lights in the sky moving from the direction of Vereeniging. The family described the lights as a craft similar in appearance to a water droplet that could change colour and shape. Two months later, a nearby town resident found marks on the ground he interpreted as having been made by a small craft's landing gear.
- In September and October 1994 a farmer at Warrenton claimed to have seen lights in the sky he described as a 'mothership' that made a sound like a helicopter or Volkswagen Beetle engine.
Sighting locations during the March–April 1995 flap, which included claims of a landed craft at Coligny
- A UFO flap swept South Africa from late March to mid April 1995, which was widely reported in the media. Claims included a hovering object at De Brug seen by a woman and police, and a farmer who said a spacecraft blocked his way for three minutes on a rural road south of Coligny. There were also claims that a truck's engine cut out and digital watches stopped as an object passed by.
- At 4:00 am on 28 August 1996 lights in the sky described by Sgt Nico Stander of the Adriaan Vlok police station, Pretoria, were videotaped. According to the story, a chase ensued involving some 200 policemen and a Bo-105 police chopper but was given up at 10,000 feet (3,000 m) in the Cullinan area, when their fuel ran low. Lights were sighted in the area again during the early hours of 31 August and 1 September.
- Around the end of July 1997 Andreas Mathios claimed to film a hovering, cylindrical light or shiny cloud in the sky above the town of Trichardt, in the current western Mpumalanga province.
- On 8 May 2000, at 3:24 am, police inspector Kriel claimed to have observed an approaching UFO while traveling on the N3 freeway, 70 km north of Warden in the eastern Free State province. According to Kriel, the orange, oval-shaped light was fitted with two cupolas, one above and another below, and was wide enough to cover four lanes of the freeway.

== 21st century ==
- On 27 June 2004, Roshnie Naidu told reporters she observed and videotaped a very bright, colourful light changing shape from circular to oval that was suspended near her home in Durban for three hours.
- In 2009 a number of people saw and recorded lights in the sky they described as two formations of high-flying, orange-red objects traveling between the towns of Middelburg and Witbank, 25 kilometres (16 mi) apart.
- On the evenings of 21 and 22 July 2010, residents of Booysens, Pretoria, reported they saw a triangle of bright lights which hung motionless in the sky for two hours.
- On the evenings of 11, 20 and 21 May 2011, a number of lights were seen that were described as silent and orange with consistent luminosity travelling "faster than a commercial aeroplane" over Tierpoort near Pretoria and Krugersdorp. On 15 June, other lights were reported in the sky over Tierpoort. At 22:00 on 30 October 2011, a Mr van Greuning photographed lights which she described as "silent fireballs observed traveling southwards in low cloud" near the town of Harrismith.
- Two Prestbury residents reported they saw "an orange orb" in the sky over Pietermaritzburg in November 2015, and took a blurry photograph. On 22 November 2015, Ian Carbutt took a cellphone photo of what he said were "four orange orbs travelling swiftly in single file" over Roberts road, Clarendon, in the direction of Greytown. On 28 November, "social media was abuzz" with various reports of "a green light hanging in the sky" over Long Street, Cape Town.
- Around 21:30 on 12 December 2016, while on an eastward course some 10 nautical miles offshore from Jeffreys Bay, the captain and co-pilot of a Boeing 737 cargo aircraft reported he saw an unidentified glowing green object rise past the cockpit, reach a cloud layer some 1,000 feet (300 m) above the plane before turning back to earth. A green parachute flare was suspected, but then ruled out due to the altitude reached. Officials at Port Elizabeth Airport suspected that a stricken vessel or aircraft might be involved, but the NSRI found that none were overdue or missing.

== Crash claims and hoaxes ==
Documents claiming that alien spacecraft were shot down by South African aircraft on 7 May 1989 and 15 September 1995 were determined to be hoaxes.

== See also ==
- List of reported UFO sightings
