= Tekna, Morocco =

Tekna
- Rural commune and town
- Location within Morocco
- Coordinates: 34.3537°N 5.5617°W
- Country: Morocco
- Region: Rabat-Salé-Kénitra
- Province: Sidi Kacem

Population (2004)
  - Total: 6,994
- Time zone: UTC+0 (GMT)

Tekna is a small town and rural commune in Sidi Kacem Province of the Rabat-Salé-Kénitra region of Morocco. At the time of the 2004 census, the commune had a total population of 6994 people living in 1017 households.
