= Had Kourt =

Coordinates: 34°37′N 5°44′W

- Town
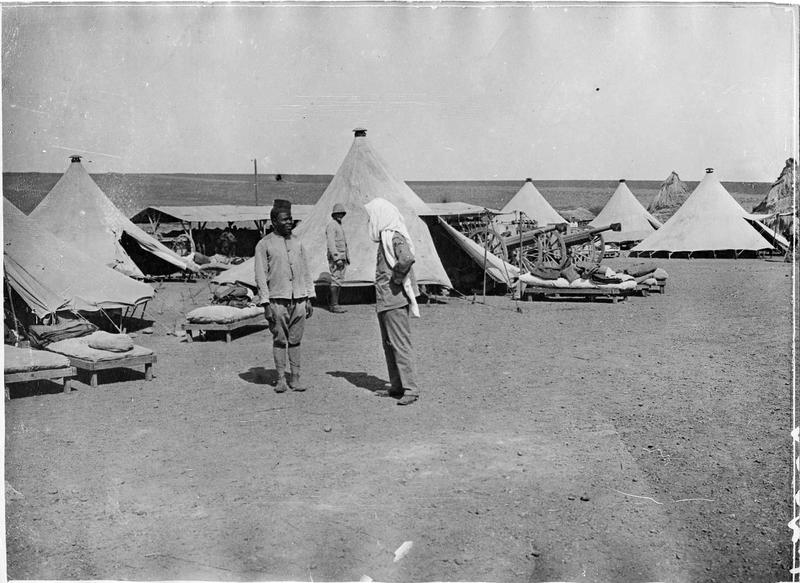
- Interactive map of Had Kourt
- Country: Morocco
- Region: Rabat-Salé-Kénitra
- Province: Sidi Kacem

Population (2004)
  - Total: 5,051
- Time zone: UTC+0 (GMT)

Had Kourt is a town that is located in the Sidi Kacem Province, Rabat-Salé-Kénitra, Morocco. According to the 2004 census, the town's population back then was 5,051.

In 2022, a center for agricultural development was opened in Had Kourt by the Minister of Agriculture Mohamed Sadiki.
