= Mechra Bel Ksiri =

Coordinates: 34°33′36″N 5°57′00″W

- Town
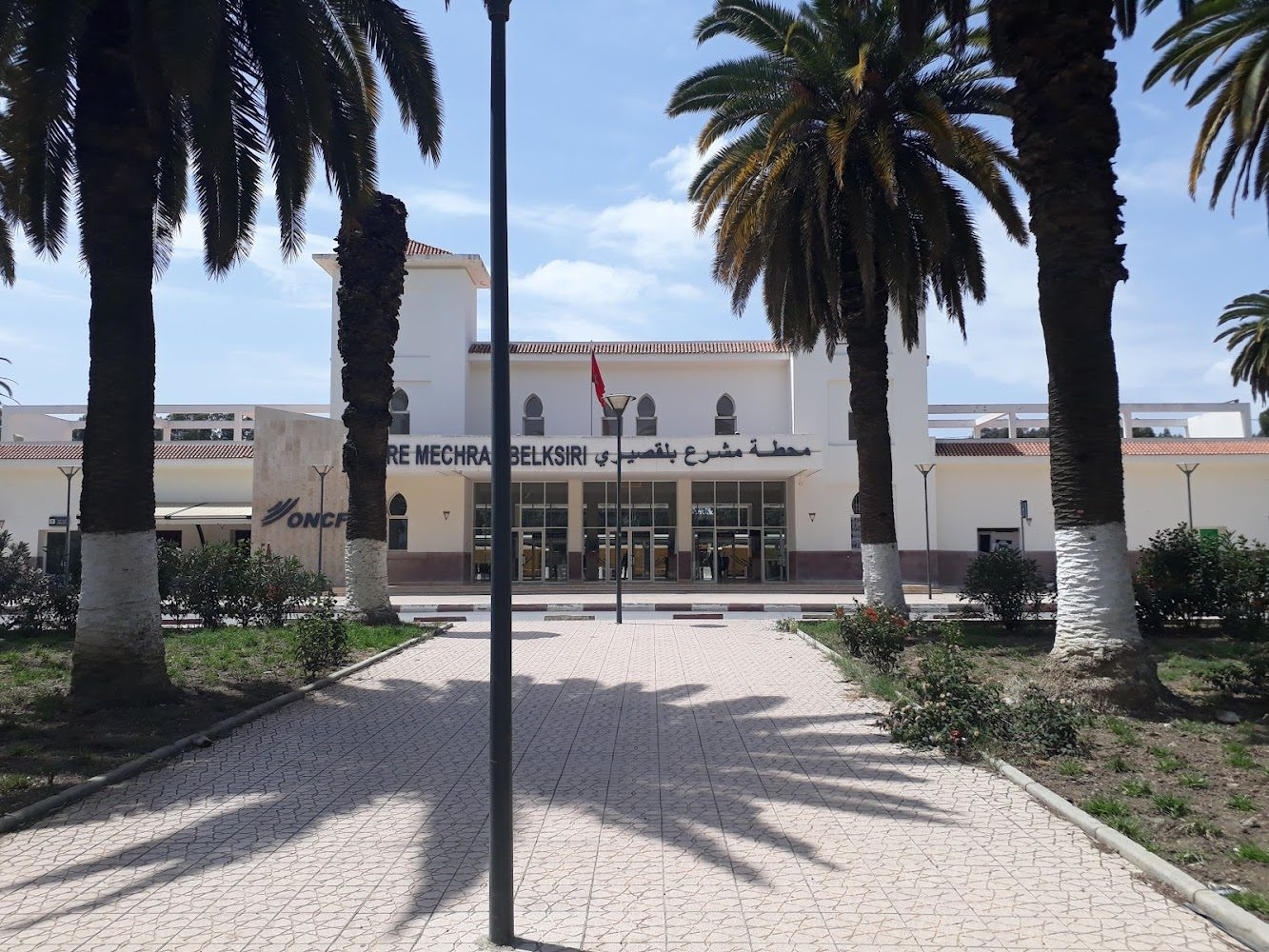
- Interactive map of Mechra Bel Ksiri
- Country: Morocco
- Region: Rabat-Salé-Kénitra
- Province: Sidi Kacem
- Elevation: 49 ft (15 m)

Population (2024)
  - Total: 32,615
- Time zone: UTC+0 (GMT)

Mechra Bel Ksiri (Arabic: مشرع بلقصيري) is a town in Sidi Kacem Province, Rabat-Salé-Kénitra, Morocco. At the time of the 2024 census, its population was 32,615.
