= Ain Beida, Ouezzane =

Ain Beida
- Rural commune and town
- Interactive map of Ain Beida
- Coordinates: 31.585°N 8.608°W
- Country: Morocco
- Region: Tanger-Tetouan-Al Hoceima
- Province: Ouezzane

Population (2004)
  - Total: 11,851
- Time zone: UTC+0 (GMT)

Ain Beida is a small town and rural commune in Ouezzane Province of the Tanger-Tetouan-Al Hoceima region of Morocco. At the time of the 2004 census, the commune had a total population of 11,851 people living in 2193 households.
