= Chbanate =

- Rural commune and town
- Location within Morocco Location within Africa
- Country: Morocco
- Region: Rabat-Salé-Kénitra
- Province: Sidi Kacem

Population (2004)
  - Total: 10,618
- Time zone: UTC+0 (GMT)

Chbanate is a small town and rural commune in Sidi Kacem Province of the Rabat-Salé-Kénitra region of Morocco. At the time of the 2004 census, the commune had a total population of 10,618 people living in 1709 households.
