= Bir Taleb =

Bir Taleb بير الطالب (Arabic)
- Rural commune and town
- Location within Morocco
- Coordinates: 34°19′53″N 5°39′53″W
- Country: Morocco
- Region: Rabat-Salé-Kénitra
- Province: Sidi Kacem

Population (2004)
  - Total: 11,252
- Time zone: UTC+0 (GMT)

Bir Taleb (Arabic: بير الطالب) is a small town and rural commune in Sidi Kacem Province of the Rabat-Salé-Kénitra region of Morocco. At the time of the 2004 census, the commune had a total population of 11,252 people living in 1734 households.
