= Sidi Yahya El Gharb =

Sidi Yahya El Gharb Sidi Yahia el Gharb Sidi Yanya du Rharb
- City
- Interactive map of Sidi Yahya El Gharb
- Coordinates: 34°18′21″N 6°18′21″W
- Country: Morocco
- Region: Rabat-Salé-Kénitra
- Province: Sidi Slimane

Population (2024)
  - Total: 39,946
- Time zone: UTC+0 (GMT)

Sidi Yahya El Gharb is a city in Sidi Slimane Province, Rabat-Salé-Kénitra, Morocco. At the 2024 census, its population was 39,946.

Prior to June 2010, Sidi Yahya El Gharb was in Kénitra Province.

== See also ==
United States Naval Communications Station Sidi Yahya El Gharb
