= Sidi Slimane, Morocco =

Sidi Slimane سيدي سليمان
- city
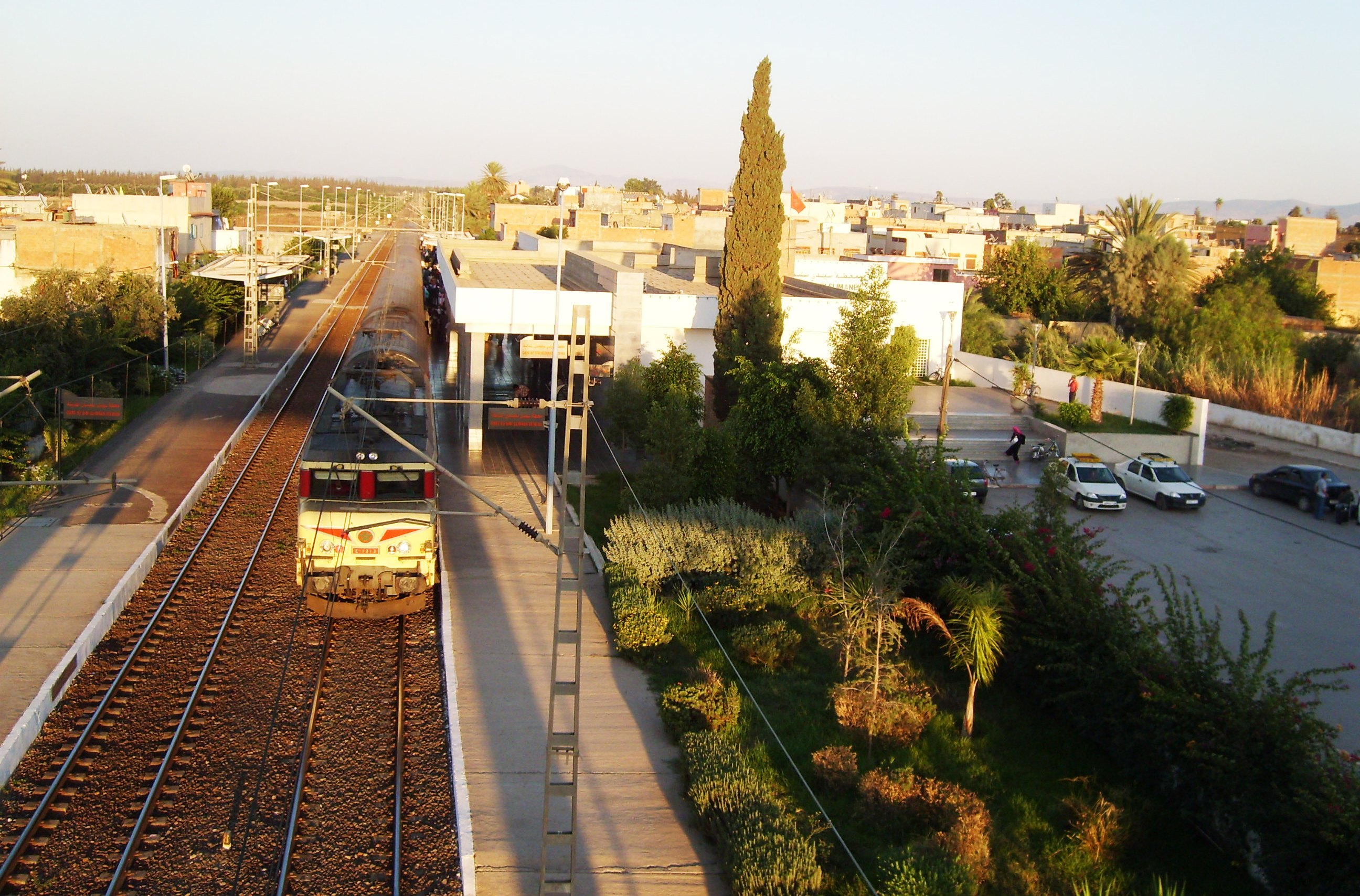
- Interactive map of Sidi Slimane
- Country: Morocco
- Region: Rabat-Salé-Kénitra
- Province: Sidi Slimane
- Elevation: 135 ft (41 m)

Population (2014)
  - Total: 92,989
- Time zone: UTC+0 (GMT)

Sidi Slimane (Arabic: سيدي سليمان) is a small city in the northwestern centre of Morocco in the Rabat-Salé-Kénitra economic region. It is the administrative headquarters for Sidi Slimane Province and is located between the major cities of Kenitra and Meknes.

The city recorded a population of 92,989 in the 2014 Moroccan census, up from 78,060 inhabitants in 2004.

The economy is mainly focused on agriculture. The population consists mainly of rural migrants. The society is still plagued with major problems such as illiteracy, unemployment and slums. Sidi Slimane is mostly renowned for its quality citrus products. It has three high schools, a public library, a downtown called "filaj" (village in French) and a local stadium called "hassania" (الحسنية in Arabic).

Sidi Slimane is home to a Moroccan Air Force base, Sidi Slimane Air Base.

It lies on the main railway line from Kenitra to Oujda.

== Notable people ==
- Nora Achahbar (born 1982), Moroccan-Dutch jurist and politician
