= Sidi Kacem =

Sidi Kacem سيدي قاسم بوعسرية - بتيجة - ظهر الشماخ
- City
- Sidi Kacem
- Interactive map of Sidi Kacem
- Coordinates: 34°13′N 5°42′W
- Country: Morocco
- Region: Rabat-Salé-Kénitra
- Province: Sidi Kacem

Government
  - Type: Governor, Pacha, Mayor
  - Governor: El Habib Nadir
  - Mayor: Abdelilah Ouaissa
- Elevation: 194 m (636 ft)

Population (2014)
  - Total: 74,036
- Time zone: UTC+0 (GMT)
- Postal code: 16000
- Area code: 212

Sidi Kacem (Arabic: سيدي قاسم, romanized: Sīdī Qāsim) is a city in Rabat-Salé-Kénitra, Morocco. It is the capital of Sidi Kacem Province.

== History ==
Under the French colonial regime, the city was called Petitjean or Petit Jean, in reference to a French captain who was killed in May 1911 during the French campaign to "pacify" Morocco. The French started oil drilling exploration in the vicinity of Sidi Kacem in 1934; production of crude oil began locally in 1939.

Slightly to the south of Sidi Kacem lies Volubilis, which was in antiquity an important Roman town near the westernmost border of the Roman Empire. It was built on the site of a previous Mauretanian settlement from the third century BC, if not earlier.

== Weather ==
Summers are hot to very hot, highs clock between 32 and 36 °C (90 and 97 °F). Winters in the other hand are comparatively chilly, especially at night, and lows usually go beyond the freezing point. During the winter it rains with an average precipitation of 350 and 600 mm (14 and 24 in). It does not snow in Sidi Kacem.

== Education ==
There are no universities in Sidi Kacem, and the only higher education available is in the Prince Moulay Abdellah Technical High School, where students can get a Higher Diploma in Electrical studies. Most residents of the city who seek higher education travel to Kenitra, where they can attend Ibn Tofail University, or other larger cities.

== Transportation ==
Sidi Kacem's small taxis have fixed tolls depending on from where you are going and your destination. Add 50% of the toll at night.

Sidi Kacem is located along Morocco's national ONCF railway line and was considered a crossroads because passengers going to the North had to switch trains in its station. This is not longer the case as the ONCF has constructed a direct railway which doesn't cross Sidi Kacem.

The town has a local bus station, which serves all the regions of the country, in addition to multiple grand-taxis stations, for the nearest cities and villages.

== Points of interest ==
- Sidi Kacem's tomb located in Zaouia.
- Oil refinery.

== Notable people ==
- Ezzaki Badou - Former international goalkeeper and former manager
- Salaheddine Sbaï - Former international footballer
- Rachid Taoussi - Former footballer and current manager
