= Sidi Kacem Province =

Sidi Kacem Province إقليم سيدي قاسم ⵜⴰⵙⴳⴰ ⵏ ⵙⵉⴷⵉ ⵇⴰⵙⵎ
- Province
- Zaggota

- Flag
- Interactive map of Sidi Kacem Province
- Country: Morocco
- Region: Rabat-Salé-Kénitra
- Seat: Sidi Kacem

Area
  - Total: 4,060 km^{2} (1,570 sq mi)

Population (2014)
  - Total: 522,270
- Time zone: UTC+0 (GMT)

Sidi Kacem Province (سيدي قاسم, ⵙⵉⴷⵉ ⵇⴰⵙⵎ) is an administrative subdivision of Morocco, located in the Rabat-Salé-Kénitra region. It takes its name from its capital, Sidi Kacem.

== History ==
The territory of present-day Sidi Kacem Province lies within the Gharb Plain, a region historically characterized by agricultural activity due to fertile soils and abundant water resources.

The province was progressively structured within the framework of Morocco’s administrative organization. The city of Sidi Kacem developed as a regional urban and economic center, particularly through agricultural and industrial activities.

Since the territorial reform of 2015, the province has been part of the Rabat-Salé-Kénitra region.

== Geography ==
Sidi Kacem Province is located in northwestern Morocco, at the heart of the Gharb Plain, one of the country’s main agricultural regions.

The province is characterized by predominantly flat terrain, favorable to agriculture, and is crossed by several wadis belonging to the Sebou River basin, which play a key role in irrigation.

The climate is Mediterranean with Atlantic influence, featuring relatively mild and humid winters and hot, dry summers.

The region is known for cereal cultivation, sugar beet production, and market gardening.

== Administration ==
=== Administrative divisions ===
According to the 2008 administrative division, as amended in 2011, Sidi Kacem Province is composed of 15 municipalities, including five urban communes: Sidi Kacem, Mechra Bel Ksiri, Jorf El Melha, Had Kourt, and Dar Gueddari.

The remaining rural communes are grouped into caïdats and circles, forming the province’s territorial administrative structure.

== Subdivisions ==
The province is divided administratively into the following municipalities and communes:

Name	Geographic code	Type	Households	Population (2004)	Foreign population	Moroccan population	Notes
Dar Gueddari	481.01.01.	Municipality	1063	6011	0	6011	
Had Kourt	481.01.03.	Municipality	1010	5051	15	5036	
Jorf El Melha	481.01.05.	Municipality	3769	20581	6	20575	
Mechra Bel Ksiri	481.01.07.	Municipality	5391	27630	8	27622	
Sidi Kacem	481.01.11.	Municipality	15499	74062	44	74018	
Ain Dfali	481.03.01.	Rural commune	4222	24521	21	24500	
Bni Oual	481.03.03.	Rural commune	1328	8480	0	8480	
Khnichet	481.03.05.	Rural commune	3593	20899	2	20897	7936 residents live in the center, called Khenichet; 12963 residents live in rural areas.
Lamrabih	481.03.07.	Rural commune	3455	20187	0	20187	
Moulay Abdelkader	481.03.09.	Rural commune	1338	8871	8	8863	
Oulad Nouel	481.03.11.	Rural commune	1755	11076	0	11076	
Sidi Ahmed Benaissa	481.03.13.	Rural commune	1358	8901	0	8901	
Sidi Ameur Al Hadi	481.03.15.	Rural commune	1866	11868	0	11868	
Sidi Azzouz	481.03.17.	Rural commune	2470	16001	0	16001	
Sidi M'Hamed Chelh	481.03.19.	Rural commune	1122	7382	0	7382	
Taoughilt	481.03.21.	Rural commune	2100	14108	0	14108	
Al Haouafate	481.05.01.	Rural commune	2627	17119	0	17119	
Dar Laaslouji	481.05.03.	Rural commune	4002	27836	5	27831	
Ermilate	481.05.05.	Rural commune	2121	15307	0	15307	
Nouirate	481.05.07.	Rural commune	3707	22639	2	22637	
Sefsaf	481.05.09.	Rural commune	3090	22941	0	22941	
Sidi Al Kamel	481.05.11.	Rural commune	3678	26800	0	26800	
Bab Tiouka	481.09.01.	Rural commune	1212	8042	0	8042	
Bir Taleb	481.09.03.	Rural commune	1734	11252	0	11252	
Chbanate	481.09.05.	Rural commune	1709	10618	0	10618	
Selfat	481.09.07.	Rural commune	1381	9686	0	9686	
Tekna	481.09.09.	Rural commune	1017	6994	0	6994	
Zaggota	481.09.11.	Rural commune	1456	9526	0	9526	
Zirara	481.09.13.	Rural commune	2613	15033	1	15032	6707 residents live in the center, called Zirara; 8326 residents live in rural areas.
