= Souk Tlet El Gharb =

- Rural commune and town
- Location within Morocco
- Coordinates: 34°37′16″N 6°8′1″W
- Country: Morocco
- Region: Rabat-Salé-Kénitra
- Province: Kénitra

Population (2004)
  - Total: 22,416
- Time zone: UTC+0 (GMT)

Souk Tlet El Gharb is a small town and rural commune in Kénitra Province of the Rabat-Salé-Kénitra region of Morocco. At the time of the 2004 census, the commune had a total population of 22,416 people living in 3315 households. It lies along National Route 1, 14.9 kilometres (9.3 mi) southwest of Souk El Arbaa and 62.4 kilometres (38.8 mi) northeast of Kenitra.
