= Douar Ed-Doumiyin =

Village in Kénitra Province, Morocco

Douar Ed-Doumiyin دوار الدوميين Doumyine, Doûmyin, Ad-Douymytn
- Douar (rural settlement)
- Location in Morocco
- Coordinates: 34°53′12″N 5°53′31″W
- Country: Morocco
- Region: Rabat-Salé-Kénitra
- Province: Kénitra Province
- Circle: Souk El Arba du Gharb
- Caïdat: Arbaoua
- Rural Commune: Arbaoua
- Time zone: UTC+01:00 (CET)

Douar Ed-Doumiyin (Arabic: دوار الدوميين; also French-transliterated as Doumyine or Doûmyin) is a rural settlement (douar) in the Arbaoua Caïdat of Kénitra Province, located in the Rabat-Salé-Kénitra region of northwestern Morocco, adjacent to the provincial border of Ouezzane Province.

== Geography ==
Douar Ed-Doumiyin is situated in the southern Loukkos River basin in the transition corridor between the agricultural plain of the Gharb and the pre-Rif hills of the historic Habt region. The settlement lies approximately 8 to 10 kilometers south-southwest of Ksar El Kebir and the historic Oued El Makhazen riverbed, and 12 kilometers east-northeast of the town center of Arbaoua.

Topographically, the village occupies the lower western piedmont beneath Jbel Ghoni (part of the Jbel Sarsar ridge). It is situated directly adjacent to several historic rural localities:

- Douar El-Bastioun (or Bastioum), located roughly 3 kilometers northeast along the rising limestone outcrop.
- The collective pastures of Demna and Guissa, belonging historically to the Sarsar fraction of the Masmouda tribal confederation to the east.

== History ==
=== Regional context and early modern era ===
Due to its position along the southern overland approaches to Ksar El Kebir, the surrounding Loukkos river plain was the theater of the 1578 Battle of Alcácer Quibir (Battle of the Three Kings), fought across the banks of the Loukkos and Oued El Makhazen. In the aftermath of the engagement, the victorious Saadian authorities established extraction outposts and agricultural settlements throughout the Loukkos and Habt foothills.

The neighboring settlement of El-Bastioun (derived from the Romance loanword bastión, or "bastion/stronghold"), situated 3.2 km up the ridge, was historically developed as an extraction quarry and lime kiln facility. Early 20th-century ethnographic surveys documented regional oral traditions identifying the site as having been operated by European prisoners of war and converts (elches) retained in the regional service of the local authorities.

=== Late 19th and early 20th century surveys ===
In early 20th-century ethnographic investigations conducted by the Mission Scientifique du Maroc, French scholars Édouard Michaux-Bellaire and Georges Salmon documented Doûmyin as an established rural staging point and settlement along the traditional interior road connecting Ksar El Kebir with Ouezzane. Administratively, the inhabitants were historically aligned with the Tliq (Tlig) fraction, forming part of the border interface with the Khlott (Khulut) and Sefiane tribal confederations.

=== French Protectorate administration ===
During the French protectorate in Morocco, the land tenure of the settlement was codified through administrative cadastres:

- On 25 October 1924, Grand Vizier Mohammed el Mokri issued a vizirial decree (arrêté viziriel), published in the Bulletin Officiel on 11 November 1924, ordering the official survey and territorial delimitation of the collective agricultural estate known as « Bou Chaïba ». Comprising approximately 600 hectares, the estate was formally gazetted to the collective community of the village (collectivité du douar Doumyine, Tribu Tliq), with boundary landmarks defined alongside the neighboring lands of the Oulad ben Saïd and the Masmouda fractions.
- On 7 January 1925, a subsequent decree amended the on-site delimitation start date, convening the tribal assembly (djema'a) at the locality of El Kelaa under the supervisory authority of the administrative post of Arbaoua.
- On 22 May 1928, village councilors and notables from Douar Ed-Doumiyin were officially confirmed as municipal representatives to the local native council of the Khlott-Tliq territory.

== Land tenure and economy ==
The local economy is predominantly agrarian and pastoral. In accordance with Moroccan land law governing collective lands (terres collectives), communal tracts are administered under traditional collective usufruct rights overseen by the Ministry of the Interior's Directorate of Rural Affairs (Direction des Affaires Rurales). The agricultural lands primarily support non-irrigated cereal cultivation (barley, wheat), olive groves, and sheep husbandry.

== See also ==
- Ksar El Kebir
- Battle of Alcácer Quibir
- Arbaoua
- Habt
