= Tayeb Saddiki =

Moroccan writer and theatre director (1939–2016)

- الطيب الصديقي
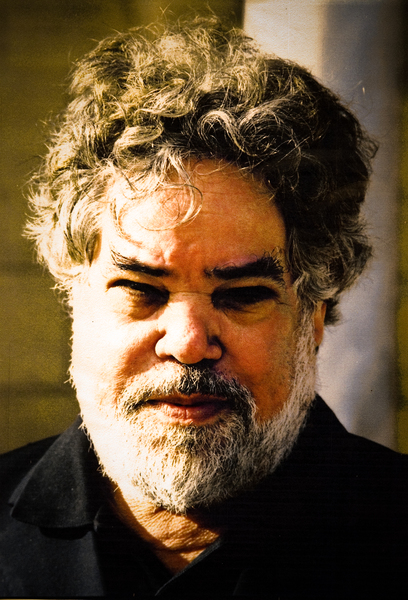
- Saddiki in 2004
- Born: 5 January 1939; Essaouira, Morocco
- Died: 5 February 2016 (aged 77); Casablanca, Morocco
- Occupations: playwright, comedian, author, calligrapher

Tayeb Saddiki (Arabic: الطيب الصديقي; 5 January 1939 – 5 February 2016) was a Moroccan theatre director and one of the most iconic and prominent Arab artists, and is considered among the foremost Arab dramatists of the twentieth century. Trained in classical Western theater, Saddiki also embraced traditional Moroccan theatrical styles, fusing the two into a path-breaking combination of Western and traditional Moroccan theater. Known for staging spectacles played to large crowds in big arenas, Saddiki developed a style of festive theater that became popular in the Arab world.

He is a pioneer of Arab theater, an actor and a film director, but he was also an award-winning author writing in both Arabic and French. From a family of scholars, he was born in Essaouira and grew up in Casablanca. After training courses with André Voisin, at the age of 17 he went abroad to France to study theater at Comédie de l'Ouest - CDO, directed by Hubert Gignoux. Back in Morocco, together with the Union Marocaine du Travail (UMT) he founded a Workers' theater / Al Masrah Al Oummali (1957). After that, he returned to France to further study theater technics at the TNP -the National Popular Theater in Paris-, under the direction of Jean Vilar.

At 23, he became artistic director of the Mohamed V theater (théâtre national Mohammed-V). After that he worked as director of the municipal theater of Casablanca (théâtre municipal de Casablanca) from 1964 to 1977.

He founded several theatre companies: Firqat Saddiki / Saddiki's troupe, Al Masrah Al Jawal / Traveling theater, Masrah Ennas / People's Theater and also his own cultural center at Casablanca, Espace Tayeb Saddiki (Tayeb Saddiki's center) at the boulevard Gandhi in Casablanca. (Source : Tayeb Saddiki Foundation)

== Biography ==
- 1953 - Stage of Dramatic Art at Maâmora (Morocco), Interpretation Award / Direction André Voisin and Charles Nugue
- 1954 - First contract with Moroccan theater troupe / la troupe du théâtre marocain, the first professional troupe in Morocco
- 1956 - Workshop at Centre Dramatique de l’Ouest – C.D.O, Rennes - Direction Hubert Gignoux
- 1957 - Works at the National Popular Theater (Théâtre National Populaire) - T.N.P in Paris, Direction Jean Vilar
- 1957-1958 - Founder of the Workers' theater (Al Masrah Al Oummali), Morocco
- 1959 - Training course at the Center Dramatique de l'Est - D.E, Direction Hubert Gignoux
- 1960 - Study Tour Berliner Ensemble - Germany, Direction Hélène Weigel - Bertolt Brecht's theatre company
- 1960 - Founder of The troupe of the Municipal Theater / (La troupe du Théâtre Municipal), Casablanca, Morocco
- 1963 - Founder of Firqat Saddiki / Saddiki's troupe, Morocco
- 1964 - Artistic director of the Mohamed V theater (théâtre national Mohammed-V), Rabat
- 1967-1969 - Member of the executive committee of Institut International du Théâtre, I.T.I – UNESCO
- 1964-1977 - Director of the municipal theater of Casablanca (théâtre municipal de Casablanca), Casablanca, Morocco
- 1970-1977 - Founder of Café-théâtre, Théâtre Municipal de Casablanca, Casablanca, Morocco
- 1970 - Founder of Masrah Ennas / People's Theater, Casablanca, Morocco
- 1974 - Founder of Al Masrah Al Jawal / Traveling theater, Casablanca, Morocco
- 1980 - Founder of Essaouira Festival Music first / la musique d'abord
- 1980 - 1982 - Responsible at the Ministry of Tourism, Casablanca, Morocco
- 1984-1986 - Television is moving (Attalfaza Tataharrak), S.N.R.T, program to revamp Moroccan television programs, Morocco
- 1997 - Founder of the Espace Tayeb Saddiki (Mogador Theater), Casablanca, Morocco

== Distinctions ==
| Country | Decoration | Year |
|---|---|---|
| Morocco | Ouissam al-Massira / the medal of the march, awarded by King Hassan II | 1976 |
| France | Chevalier des Arts et des Lettres / Knight of Arts and Letters | 1979 |
| France | Officier des Arts et des Lettres / Officer of Arts and Letters | 1983 |
| Tunisia | Price of the first work at Carthage Film Days (journées cinématographiques de Carthage) for his film Zeft | 1984 |
| France | Commandeur des Arts et des Lettres / Commander of Arts and Letters | 1997 |
| Morocco | Ouissam al-Kafaâ al-Fikria / The Medal of Intellectual Competence, décerné par le Roi Mohammed VI | 2005 |

== Works ==
- Theater director: more than eighty works
- Repertory: has written thirty two plays (in Arabic and French), translation and adaptation of thirty-four dramatic works, eighteen co-written works
- Actor: in about fifty plays, a dozen movies and thirty five dramatic works and television shows
- Painter Calligrapher: Exhibitions in Morocco and Tunisia, Kuwait, Qatar, Sultanate of Oman, France, Canada, Belgium, Algeria ...
- Cinema: directed four short films and a movie (Zeft - 1984), wrote and directed a dozen documentaries and played in a dozen films
- Television: produced and directed for television thirty shows
- Television is moving (Attalfaza Tataharrak)": program to redesign programs of the Moroccan television SNRT (1984-1986)
- Other:
  - Participated to the researches and writing of the book: Morocco and Traditional Islamic Crafts in Architecture (Le Maroc et l'Artisanat Traditionnel Islamique dans l'Architecture / Le Paccard) - 2 volumes, Author : André Paccard, Edition: Workshop 74, 1986
  - Prefacier of the book: Mogador, my love (Mogador, mon amour), Author: Marcel Crespil, Illustrator: William Olegini, Edition: Casablanca: EDDIF, 1990
  - Illustrator of the book: Freshness of Islam (Fraîcheur de l'Islam), Author: Gabriel Bounoure (1886-1969), Edition: Saint-Clément-la-Rivière: Éditions Fata Morgana, 1995
  - Contributed to the writing of the book Moroccan Civilization, Arts and Cultures (Civilisation Marocaine, Arts et Cultures), under the direction of Mohamed Sijelmassi, editions OUM and Actes Sud / Sindbad, 1996

== Cinema actor ==
- 1955 : Le Poulet (The Chicken), Jean Fléchet
- 1956 : Le médecin malgré lui (Toubib Al Affia), Directed by Henry Jacques, adapted from Molière, presented at Cannes festival in 1956 (official selection)
- 1957 : Brahim ou le collier de beignets (Brahim or the necklace of donuts), by Jean Fléchet, Presented at the Berlin Festival (1957)
- 1959: Loqmat Aïch (for a bite of bread), by Larbi Bennani
- 1960: Les fourberies Scapin, (Scapin the Schemer), Cinema adaptation of Molière's play (in Arabic), directed by Jean Mousselle and adapted by Mahieddine Bachtarzi Algeria, production Fred Orain : Castella Films & Armor Films
- 1962: Tartarin De Tarascon, Francis Blanche
- 1962: The children of the sun (Les enfants du soleil), Jacques Severac Cannes Film Festival of 1962 (official selection)
- 1962: Lawrence of Arabia, David Lean
- 1976: Arrissala (The Message), Mostapha Akkad
- 1977: Zenobia Queen of Palmyrene, Serie TV with Nidal Al Achkar
- 1984: Zeft (Ashphalte), by Tayeb Saddiki
- 1986: The child of the sand (L’enfant du sable), Hamid Bénani
- 1995: The Prayer of the Absentee (La prière de l’absent), Hamid Bénani
- 2001: Assir Al Matrouz (the man who embroidered secrets), Omar Chraïbi
- 2008: Voyage court mais trash (Short but trashy trip), Short film by Raja Saddiki

== Scenarios and productions ==
=== Motion picture ===
- Zeft, movies from the play by the same author Sidi Yassin Fi Tariq

=== Movie Scenarios ===
- Blood Wedding, Souheil Ben Barka, 1976, as co-writer and dialogue
- Sijnabad, written by Tayeb Saddiki in 1984, never shot
- The golden tooth / la dent d'or, written by Tayeb Saddiki in 1985, never shot

=== Documentaries ===
- Traditional medicine with Jacques Barratier (40 min)
- Dragonfly (Libellule) (30 min)
- The Ciriers of Fez (22 min)
- Moroccan painting (36 min)
- Agadir's marquee (40 min)
- Dakira (memory), 10 hours on the history of Morocco
- It was a faith (Il était une foi) (30 min), film about the Hassan II Mosque with Hamid Berrada

=== Institutional films ===
- BCM (30 min)
- OCP (40 min)
- The Marrakech Festival (26 min)
- I.U.M (University of Ifrane) (25 min)
- The Baghdad Festival (20 min)

=== Adapted works for television ===
- Al Faylassouf
- Mahjouba
- The Farce of the Master Pathelin
- Volpone
- Diwan Sidi Abderrahman El Mejdoub
- Sidi Yassin Fi Tariq
- El Harraz (2 versions)
- Annour Oua Addijour
- Khourafat Al Maskine
- Annakcha
- Translated Signs
- The superstition
- The good ones
- The Fear of the Blows
- Al Qouq fi Sandouq
- Moummou Boukhersa
- Nahnou
- Massiratouna
- Alf Hikaya Wa Hikaya Fi Souq Okad
- Maqamat Badii Ezzamane El Hamadani
- Aswat Oua Adouae
- The Seven Grains Of Beauty
- Al Fil Wa Sarawil
- Wa Laou Kanat Foula
- Jnane Chiba
- Qaftane Al Hob Al Mrassae Bal Houa
- Al Qouq Fi Sandouq
- Bouktef
- Azizi
- Al Karassi

== Plays ==
- Ammi Zalt
  - Original work: Bonhomme Misère
  - Staging and dramatic rewriting : André Voisin
  - Adaptation: Ahmed Taïeb El Alj
  - Language : Arabic
- Maâlem Azzouz
  - Original work: Le Barbier de Séville, Pierre-Augustin Caron de Beaumarchais
  - Adaptation: Ataa Ouakil (Abdessamad Kenfaoui, Tahar Ouaâziz and Ahmed Taïeb El Alj)
  - Stage direction: André Voisin
  - Language : Arabic

=== 1955-1956 ===
- Ach’taba (les balayeurs)
  - Original work: Troupe du Théâtre Marocain
  - Stage direction: André Voisin
  - Language : Arabic
- Aâmayel J’ha
  - Original work: Les fourberies de Scapin, Molière
  - Adaptation: Ataa Ouakil (Abdessamad Kenfaoui, Tahar Ouaâziz and Ahmed Taïeb El Alj)
  - Stage direction: André Voisin
  - Assistant: Tayeb Saddiki
  - Language : Arabic
- Hamland
  - Original work: William Shakespeare
  - Translation: Khalil Matran, Tahar Ouaâziz
  - Stage direction: André Voisin
  - Language : Arabic
- Ahl Al Kahf (les gens de la caverne)
  - Original work: Tawfiq Al Hakim
  - Stage direction: Didier Béraud
  - Language : Arabic

=== 1956-1957 ===
- Al Warith
  - Original work: Le légataire universel, Jean-François Regnard
  - Adaptation: Ahmed Taïeb El Alj and Tayeb Saddiki
  - Stage direction: Tayeb Saddiki
  - Language : Arabic
- Al Faylassouf (le philosophe)
  - Original work: La jalousie du barbouillé de Molière
  - Adaptation & Stage direction: Ahmed Taïeb El Alj and Tayeb Saddiki
  - Language : Arabic
- Le médecin volant, Molière
  - Adaptation & Stage direction: Ahmed Taïeb El Alj and Tayeb Saddiki
  - Language : Arabic
- Les Bonnes, Jean Genand
  - Adaptation & Stage direction: Ahmed Taïeb El Alj and Tayeb Saddiki
  - Language : Arabic

=== 1957-1958 ===
- Al Moufattich
  - Original work: Le Révizor de Nicolaï Gogol
  - Adaptation & Stage direction: Tayeb Saddiki
  - Language : Arabic
- Volte-face
  - Original work: Bayn Yawm Wa layla (entre jour and nuit) de Tawfiq Al Hakim
  - Translation : Théâtre multicolore, recueil de pièces de théâtre, Nouvelles Ed. Latines, 1954
  - Stage direction: Tayeb Saddiki
  - Language : French

=== 1958-1959 ===
- Al Jins Allatif
  - Original work: L’assemblée des femmes and Lysistrata d’Aristophane
  - Adaptation & Stage direction: Tayeb Saddiki
  - Language : Arabic
- Pantagleize
  - Original work: Michel de Ghelderode
  - Stage direction: Georges Goubert
  - Language : French
  - Centre dramatique de l’Ouest – C.D.O. (role : Ban Boulah)

=== 1959-1960 ===
- Le Carthaginois
  - Original work: Plaute
  - Adaptation : Henri Clouard
  - Stage direction: Daniel Sorano
  - Language : French
  - Théâtre du Vieux-Colombier, Paris (role: Milphin)
- Les fourberies de Scapin
  - Original work: Molière
  - Stage direction: Jacques Sarthou
  - Language : French
  - Théâtre du Vieux-Colombier, Paris (role: Scapin)
- La peur des coups, Georges Courteline
  - Adaptation & Stage direction: Tayeb Saddiki
  - Language : Arabic
- Volpone, Ben Jonson
  - Adaptation & Stage direction: Tayeb Saddiki
  - Language : Arabic

=== 1960-1961 ===
- Qissat Al Hasnae (histoire de la belle)
  - Original work: Lady Godiva, Jean Carrole
  - Adaptation & Stage direction: Tayeb Saddiki
  - Language : Arabic
- Safar Tchûn Li
  - Original work: Le Voyage de Tchong-li, Sacha Guitry
  - Adaptation & Stage direction: Tayeb Saddiki
  - Language : Arabic
- Moulat Al Foundouk
  - Original work: La locandiera de Carlo Goldoni
  - Adaptation : Tayeb Saddiki
  - Stage direction: Abdessamad Dinia
  - Language : Arabic
- Mahjouba
  - Original work: L’école des femmes, Molière
  - Adaptation & Stage direction: Tayeb Saddiki
  - Language : Arabic

=== 1961-1962 ===
- Fi Intidar Mabrouk
  - Original work: En attendant Godot de Samuel Beckandt
  - Adaptation & Stage direction: Tayeb Saddiki
  - Language : Arabic
- Al Fassl Al Akhir
  - Original work: Aziz Seghrouchni
  - Stage direction: Tayeb Saddiki
  - Language : Arabic

=== 1962-1963 ===
- Al Moussadafa
  - Original work: Le jeu de l’amour and du hasard, Pierre de Marivaux
  - Adaptation & Stage direction: Tayeb Saddiki
  - Language : Arabic

=== 1963-1964 ===
- Hamid ou Hammad
  - Original work: Abdallah Chakroun
  - Adaptation : Tayeb Saddiki
  - Stage direction: Abdessamad Dinia
  - Language : Arabic
- Oued El Makhazine (The Battle of the Three Kings)
  - Original work & Stage direction: Tayeb Saddiki
  - Epic show

=== 1964-1965 ===
- Moummou Boukhersa
  - Original work: Amédée ou comment s’en débarrasser, Eugène Ionesco
  - Adaptation & Stage direction: Tayeb Saddiki
  - Language : Arabic

=== 1965-1966 ===
- Soltan Tolba
  - Original work: Abdessamad Kenfaoui
  - Stage direction: Tayeb Saddiki
  - Language : Arabic
- Sidi Yassin Fi Tariq
  - Original work & Stage direction: Tayeb Saddiki
  - Language : Arabic
- Al Maghrib Wahed (le Maroc est Un)
  - Original work: Saïd Saddiki and Tayeb Saddiki
  - Stage direction: Tayeb Saddiki
  - Epic show

=== 1966-1967 ===
- Madinat Annouhas
  - Original work: Saïd Saddiki
  - Stage direction: Tayeb Saddiki
  - Language : Arabic
- Rajoul Fi Al Massida
  - Original work: Piège pour un homme seul, Robert Thomas
  - Adaptation & Stage direction: Tayeb Saddiki
  - Language : Arabic

=== 1967-1968 ===
- Diwan Sidi Abderrahman El Mejdoub
  - Original work & Stage direction: Tayeb Saddiki
  - Language : Arabic

=== 1968-1969 ===
- Moulay Ismaïl
  - Original work: Saïd Saddiki and Tayeb Saddiki
  - Stage direction: Tayeb Saddiki
  - Epic show

=== 1969-1970 ===
- Annakcha
  - Original work : Le journal d’un fou, Nicolaï Gogol
  - Original work & Stage direction: Tayeb Saddiki
  - Language : Arabic
- Al Akbach Tatamarrane
  - Original work: Ahmed Taïeb El Alj and Tayeb Saddiki
  - Stage direction : Tayeb Saddiki
  - Language : Arabic
- Arras Oua Achaâkouka
  - Original work: Saïd Saddiki
  - Stage direction : Tayeb Saddiki
  - Language : Arabic

=== 1970-1971 ===
- Kaddour Nour and Ghandour
  - Original work: Fando and lys, Fernando Arrabal
  - Adaptation : Tayeb Saddiki
  - Stage direction : Hamid Zoughi
  - Language : Arabic
  - Language : Arabic
- Je mange de ce pain-là (I eat from that Bread)
  - Original work and stage direction: Tayeb Saddiki
  - Language : French
- ‘Ala Baladi Al Mahboub
  - Original work: Ali Haddani and Tayeb Saddiki
  - Stage direction : Tayeb Saddiki
  - Language : Arabic
  - Epic show
- Al Harraz
  - Original work : Abdeslam Chraïbi
  - Rewriting & Stage direction: Tayeb Saddiki
  - Language : Arabic

=== 1971-1972 ===
- Maârakat Zellaqa
  - Original work and Stage direction: Tayeb Saddiki
  - Epic show
- Maqamat Badii Ezzamane El Hamadani
  - Original work and Stage direction : Tayeb Saddiki
  - Language : Arabic

=== 1972-1973 ===
- Annour Oua Addijour
  - Original work : Abdeslam Chraïbi and Tayeb Saddiki
  - Stage direction : Tayeb Saddiki
  - Language : Arabic
- La magie rouge (Red Magic)
  - Original work : Michel de Ghelderode
  - Stage direction : Tayeb Saddiki
  - Presented by two theatratic troupes : ATF (Friends of French theatre, France) and Masrah Ennas (Morocco)
  - Language : French
- Kane Ya Ma Kane Aou Maghrib 73
  - Original work : Saïd Saddiki
  - Stage direction : Tayeb Saddiki
  - Language : Arabic

=== 1973-1974 ===
- Essefoud
  - Original work and Stage direction : Tayeb Saddiki
  - Language : Arabic
- Al Qouq fi Sandouq
  - Original work : Misère and noblesse, Eduardo Scarpandta
  - Stage direction : Tayeb Saddiki
  - Language : Arabic
- Moulay Idriss
  - Original work : Abdeslam Al Beqqali
  - Stage direction : Tayeb Saddiki
  - Epic show

=== 1974-1975 ===
- Khourafat Al Maskine
  - Original work and Stage direction : Tayeb Saddiki
  - Language : Arabic
- Cha’ir Al Hamra
  - Collective creation
  - Stage direction : Tayeb Saddiki
  - Epic show
- Al Massira Al Khadra
  - Collective creation
  - Stage direction : Tayeb Saddiki
  - Epic show

=== 1975-1976 ===
- Al Ghoufrane
  - Original work : Azzeddine El Madani, from the book of Abou Alaa Al Maârri
  - Stage direction : Tayeb Saddiki
  - Language : Arabic

=== 1976-1977 ===
- Bouktef
  - Original work : Abdessamad Kenfaoui
  - Stage direction : Tayeb Saddiki
  - Language : Arabic

=== 1979-1980 ===
- Darna
  - Original work : Tayeb Saddiki
  - One Man Show / Tales
  - Language : Arabic / French

=== 1980-1981 ===
- Iqad Assarira fi Tarikh Essaouira
  - Original work : Mohamed Ben Saïd Saddiki
  - Adaptation and Stage direction : Tayeb Saddiki
  - Language : Arabic
- Al Bey’aa
  - Original work and Stage direction : Tayeb Saddiki
  - Epic show

=== 1982-1983 ===
- Chants Mystiques, les confréries
  - Original work and Stage direction: Tayeb Saddiki
  - Poems and texts from Sufis and mystics
  - Language : Arabic

=== 1983-1984 ===
- Kitab Al Imtae Wa Al Mouanassa (Abū Hayyān al-Tawhīdī)
  - Original work : Tayeb Saddiki
  - Stage direction : Tayeb Saddiki
  - Language : Arabic / French

=== 1984-1985 ===
- Alf Hikaya Wa Hikaya fi Souq Okad
  - Original work : Walid Saif
  - Scenario : Tayeb Saddiki and Nidal Ashqar
  - Stage direction : Tayeb Saddiki
  - Language : Arabic

=== 1985-1986 ===
- Massiratouna
  - Collective creation
  - Stage direction : Tayeb Saddiki
  - Epic show
- Nahnou
  - Collective creation
  - Stage direction : Tayeb Saddiki
  - Epic show

=== 1989-1990 ===
- Aswat Oua Adouae
  - Original work : Saïd Saddiki and Mohammed Kaouti
  - Stage direction : Tayeb Saddiki
  - Epic show

=== 1990-1991 ===
- Les sept grains de beauté
  - Original work and Stage direction : Tayeb Saddiki
  - Language : French
- Les folies berbères
  - Original work : Tayeb Saddiki
  - Stage direction : Abdelkader Alloula
  - Language : French / Arabic

=== 1991-1992 ===
- Nous sommes faits pour nous entendre
  - Original work and Stage direction : Tayeb Saddiki
  - Language : French

=== 1993-1994 ===
- Molière, ou pour l’amour de l’humanité (Prix Atlas)
  - Original work and Stage direction : Tayeb Saddiki
  - Language : French

=== 1996-1997 ===
- Al Fil Oua Saraouil (éléphant and pantalons)
  - Original work and Stage direction : Tayeb Saddiki
  - Bsat theater en Arabic

=== 1997-1998 ===
- Jnane Chiba
  - Original work and Stage direction : Tayeb Saddiki
  - Bsat theater in Arabic
- Wa Laou Kanat Foula
  - Original work and Stage direction : Tayeb Saddiki
  - Bsat theater in Arabic

=== 1998-1999 ===
- Qaftane Al Hob Al Mrassae Bal Houa
  - Original work and Stage direction : Tayeb Saddiki
  - Bsat theater in Arabic

=== 1999-2000 ===
- As’hour ‘Inda Al Mouslimine, Al Yahoud wa Annassara
  - Original work and Stage direction : Tayeb Saddiki
  - Bsat theater in Arabic

=== 2000-2001 ===
- Tiw Tiw
  - Original work and Stage direction : Tayeb Saddiki
  - Language : Arabic
  - Kids theater

=== 2001-2002 ===
- Al Masrah Elmahdoume
  - Original work : Tayeb Saddiki (translated from le dîner de gala)
  - Adaptation and Stage direction : Tayeb Saddiki
  - Language : Arabic

=== 2003-2004 ===
- Azizi
  - Original work and Stage direction : Tayeb Saddiki from original texts and poems of Saïd Saddiki
  - Language : Arabic and French
- La Boule Magique (la Bola Magica)
  - Original work and Stage direction : Tayeb Saddiki
  - Language : Arabic and Spanish
  - Kids theater

=== 2005-2006 ===
- Al Karassi
  - Original work : les chaises, Eugène Ionesco
  - Adaptation and Stage direction : Tayeb Saddiki
  - Language : Arabic

=== 2010-2011 ===
- Bouhdi (Wana Mali) (Alone, Why do I care)
  - Original work: Tayeb Saddiki
  - One Man Show
  - Language : Arabic / French

=== 2018-2019 ===
- Sidi Abderrahmane El Majdoub
  - Original work: Tayeb Saddiki (1966)
  - Production : Tayeb Saddiki Foundation
  - Language : Arabic
  - Morocco - France - Italy - United Arab Emirates
