= A Prayer for the Absent =

- Directed by: Hamid Bénani
- Written by: Hamid Bénani
- Based on: Novel of the same title by Tahar Ben Jelloun
- Starring: Hamid Basket, Saâdia Azagoun, Abdelkebir Rguegda, Khadija Farahi
- Cinematography: Tonino Maccopi, Girolamo Larosa
- Edited by: Françoise Collin
- Music by: Olivier Debard
- Production company: Lumière de la Ville et Atlantis Film Internationale
- Release date: 1995
- Running time: 90 minutes
- Country: Morocco
- Language: Moroccan Arabic

The Absent's Prayer (Arabic: صلاة الغيب, French: La prière de l'absent) is a 1995 Moroccan film. It is an adaptation by director Hamid Bénani, of the novel of the same name by Tahar Ben Jelloun.

== Synopsis ==
After having lived an idle life devoted to literary passions, and following serious emotional and family conflicts, Mokhtar, who has become amnesiac, undertakes an initiatory journey to Morocco during which he rediscovers the character of his past and his entire memory.

== Cast ==
- Hamid Basket
- Saâdia Azagoun
- Abdelkebir Rguegda
- Khadija Farahi
- Ahmed Tayeb Laalej
- Tayeb Saddiki
