= Lalla Mimouna =

Lalla Mimouna لالة ميمونة
- Town
- Location in Morocco
- Coordinates: 34°51′00″N 6°04′01″W
- Country: Morocco
- Region: Rabat-Salé-Kénitra
- Province: Kénitra

Population (2004)
  - Total: 12,994
- Time zone: UTC+0 (GMT)

Lalla Mimouna (Arabic: لالة ميمونة, romanized: Lālla Mīmūna) is a town in Kenitra Province, Rabat-Salé-Kénitra, Morocco. At the 2004 census, it had a population of 12,994.

== Etymology ==
The town gets its name from a famous saint of the Gharb region. The saint Lalla Mimouna (Mimouna is a name historically given to black slaves) also known as Lalla Mimouna Tagnaout ("Black Mimouna" in Berber) was associated with another saint Moulay Bousselham who gave his name to the nearby town of Moulay Bousselham. According to one tradition. she was a beautiful woman from Saguia el-Hamra whose beauty could cause the temptation of men. To solve this issue, she prayed to God to transform her into a black woman.
