= Salahiddine Khlifi =

Moroccan footballer

Salah Khlifi
Personal information
- Full name: Salah Iddine Khlifi
- Date of birth: March 14, 1979 (age 47)
- Place of birth: Bouknadel, Morocco
- Height: 1.78 m (5 ft 10 in)
- Position: Midfielder

Youth career
- Kénitra AC

Senior career*
Years	Team	Apps	(Gls)
2000–2001	Kénitra AC	20	(0)
2001–2002	BW Grümerbaum	11	(0)
2002–2003	Neuchâtel Xamax	12	(0)
2003–2005	Ittihad Jeddah	49	(23)
2005–2006	Al Qadsiah	22	(9)
2006–2009	SR Delémont	44	(7)
2009–2010	Kénitra AC		
2010	Wydad de Fès		
2010–2011	Hassania Agadir	23	(0)
2011–2012	COD Meknès	13	(1)
2012–2013	CR Al Hoceima	22	(1)
- * Club domestic league appearances and goals

Salahiddine Khlifi (Arabic: صلاح خليفي; born 14 March 1979 in Bouknadel) is a Moroccan former professional footballer who played as a midfielder.
