= Haddada, Morocco =

Haddada
- Rural commune and town
- Location within Morocco
- Coordinates: 34°13′25″N 6°30′40″W
- Country: Morocco
- Region: Rabat-Salé-Kénitra
- Province: Kénitra

Population (2004)
  - Total: 11,856
- Time zone: UTC+0 (GMT)

Haddada (Arabic: حدادة, romanized: ḥadādẗ) is a town and rural commune located just southeast of Kenitra, in the Rabat-Salé-Kénitra region, Morocco. At the time of the 2004 census, the commune had a total population of 11,856 people living in 1728 households.
