= Sidi Boubker El Haj =

Sidi Boubker El Haj سيدي بوبكر الحاج
- Rural commune and town
- Location within Morocco
- Coordinates: 34.9148°N 6.0735°W
- Country: Morocco
- Region: Rabat-Salé-Kénitra
- Province: Kénitra

Population (2004)
  - Total: 15,990
- Time zone: UTC+0 (GMT)

Sidi Boubker El Haj is a small town and rural commune in Kénitra Province, Rabat-Salé-Kénitra, Morocco. At the time of the 2004 census, the commune had a total population of 15,990 people living in 2286 households.
