= Chouafaa =

- Rural commune and town
- Location within Morocco
- Coordinates: 34°46′N 6°03′W
- Country: Morocco
- Region: Rabat-Salé-Kénitra
- Province: Kénitra

Population (2004)
  - Total: 17,202
- Time zone: UTC+0 (GMT)

Chouafaa is a small town and rural commune in Kénitra Province of the Rabat-Salé-Kénitra region of Morocco. At the time of the 2004 census, the commune had a total population of 17,202 people living in 2337 households.
