= Kariat Ben Aouda =

Kariat Ben Aouda قرية بن عودة
- Rural commune and town
- Location within Morocco
- Coordinates: 34°46′N 5°57′W
- Country: Morocco
- Region: Rabat-Salé-Kénitra
- Province: Kénitra

Population (2004)
  - Total: 11,147
- Time zone: UTC+0 (GMT)

Kariat Ben Aouda is a small town and rural commune in Kénitra Province of the Rabat-Salé-Kénitra region of Morocco. At the time of the 2004 census, the commune had a total population of 11,147 people living in 1719 households.
