= Sidi Mohamed Lahmar =

Sidi Mohamed Lahmar سيدي محمد الأحمر
- Rural commune and town
- Location within Morocco
- Coordinates: 34°43′N 6°16′W
- Country: Morocco
- Region: Rabat-Salé-Kénitra
- Province: Kénitra

Population (2004)
  - Total: 36,125
- Time zone: UTC+0 (GMT)

Sidi Mohamed Lahmar (Arabic: سيدي محمد الأحمر, romanized: Sīdī Muḥammad al-Aḥmar) is a small town and rural commune in Kénitra Province of the Rabat-Salé-Kénitra region of Morocco. At the time of the 2004 census, the commune had a total population of 36,125 people living in 4844 households.
