= Bouknadel =

Sidi Bouknadel سيدي بوقنادل
- Town
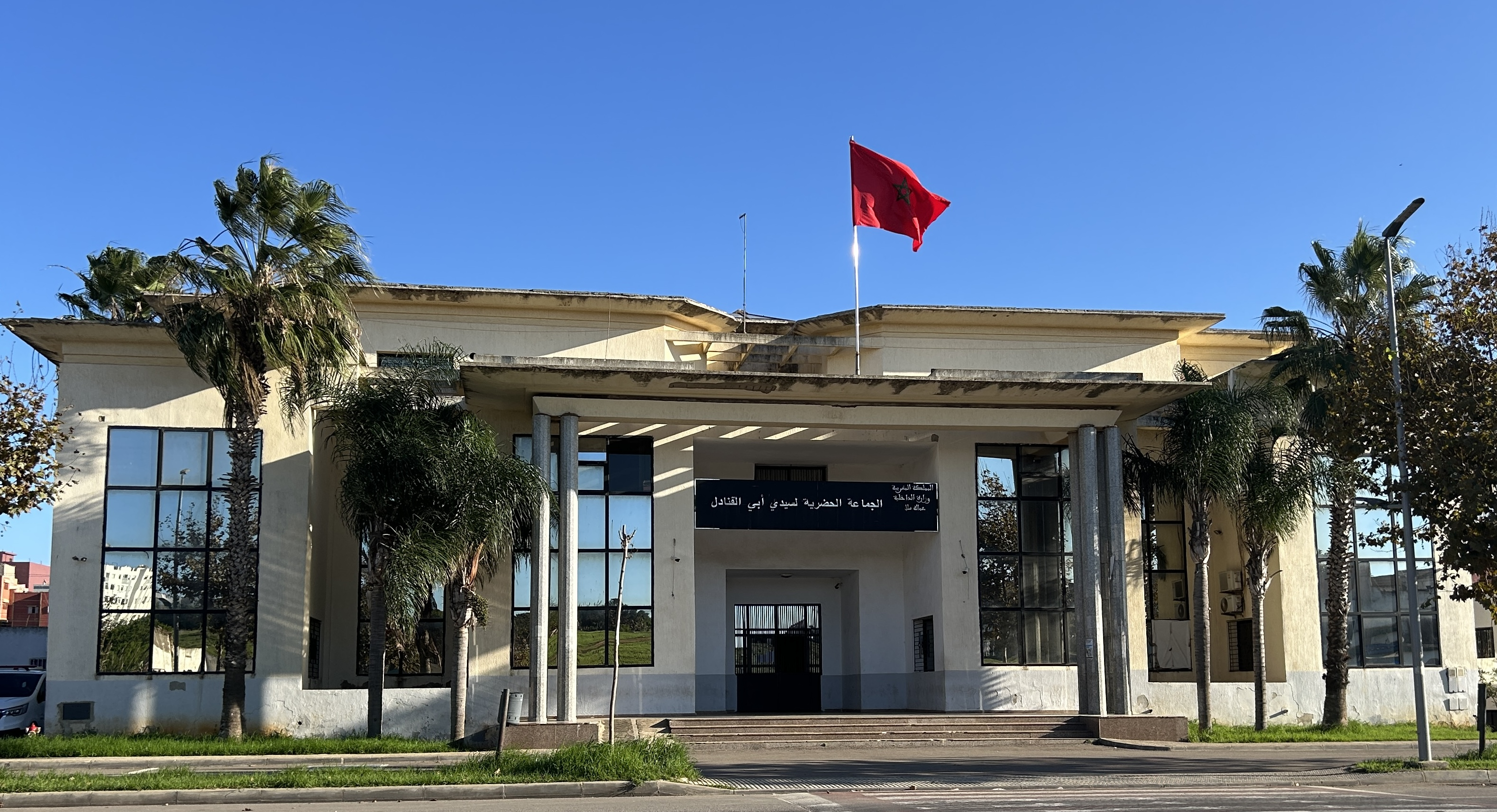
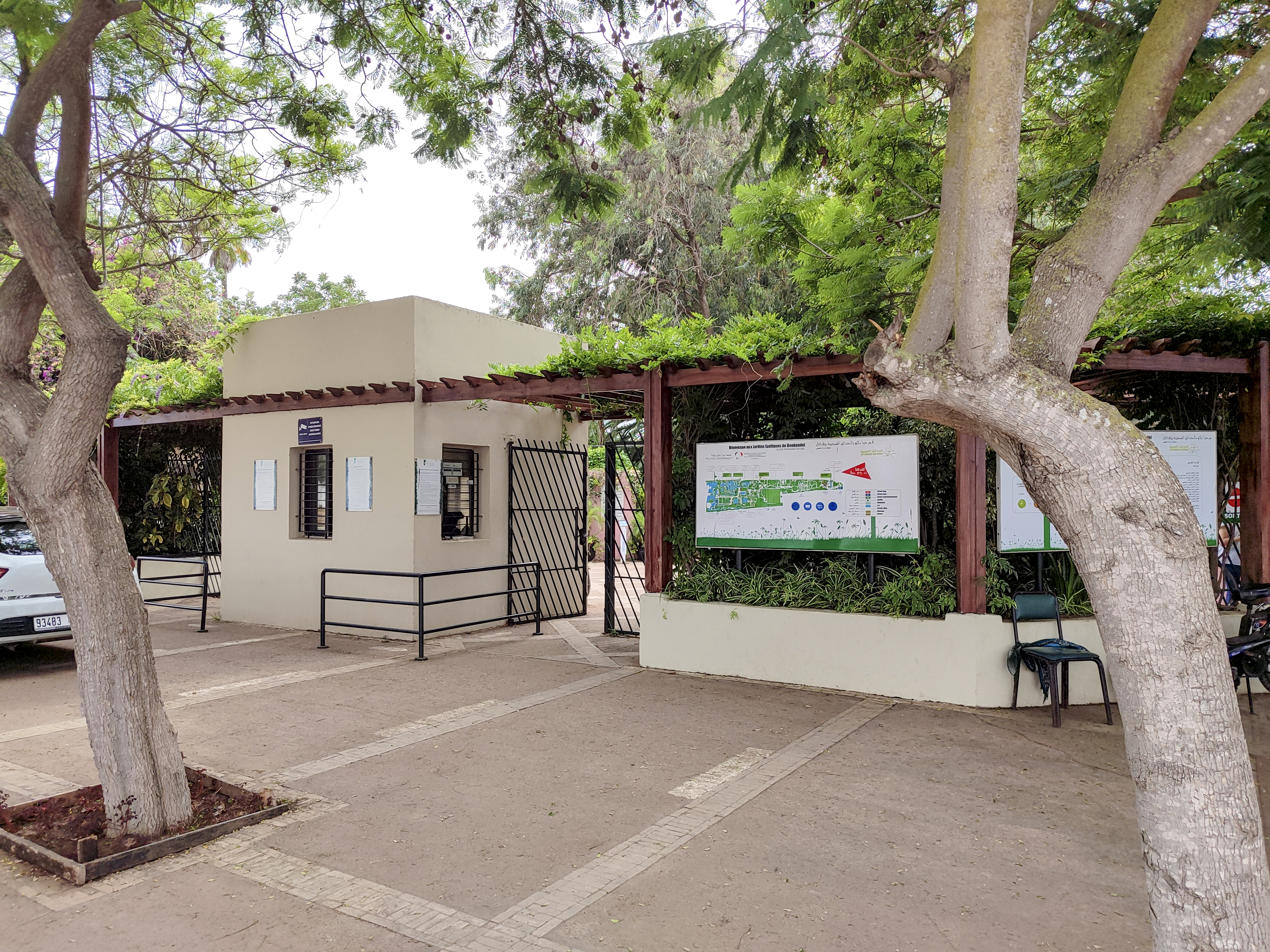
- Interactive map of Sidi Bouknadel
- Coordinates: 34.1333°N 6.73333°W
- Country: Morocco
- Region: Rabat-Salé-Kénitra
- Province: Salé Prefecture

Population (2024)
  - Total: 43,598
- Time zone: UTC+0 (GMT)

Bouknadel (Tamazight: ⴱⵓⵇⵏⴰⴷⵍ, Arabic: بوقنادل) is a town on the Atlantic coast of Morocco situated slightly to the north of Rabat and south of Kenitra.

The locale is the site of a former U.S. Naval Radio Transmitter Communications Station (USNRST Bouknadel Morocco). The Naval Airstation was near the town of Kenitra, formerly known as Port Lyautey

== Tourism ==
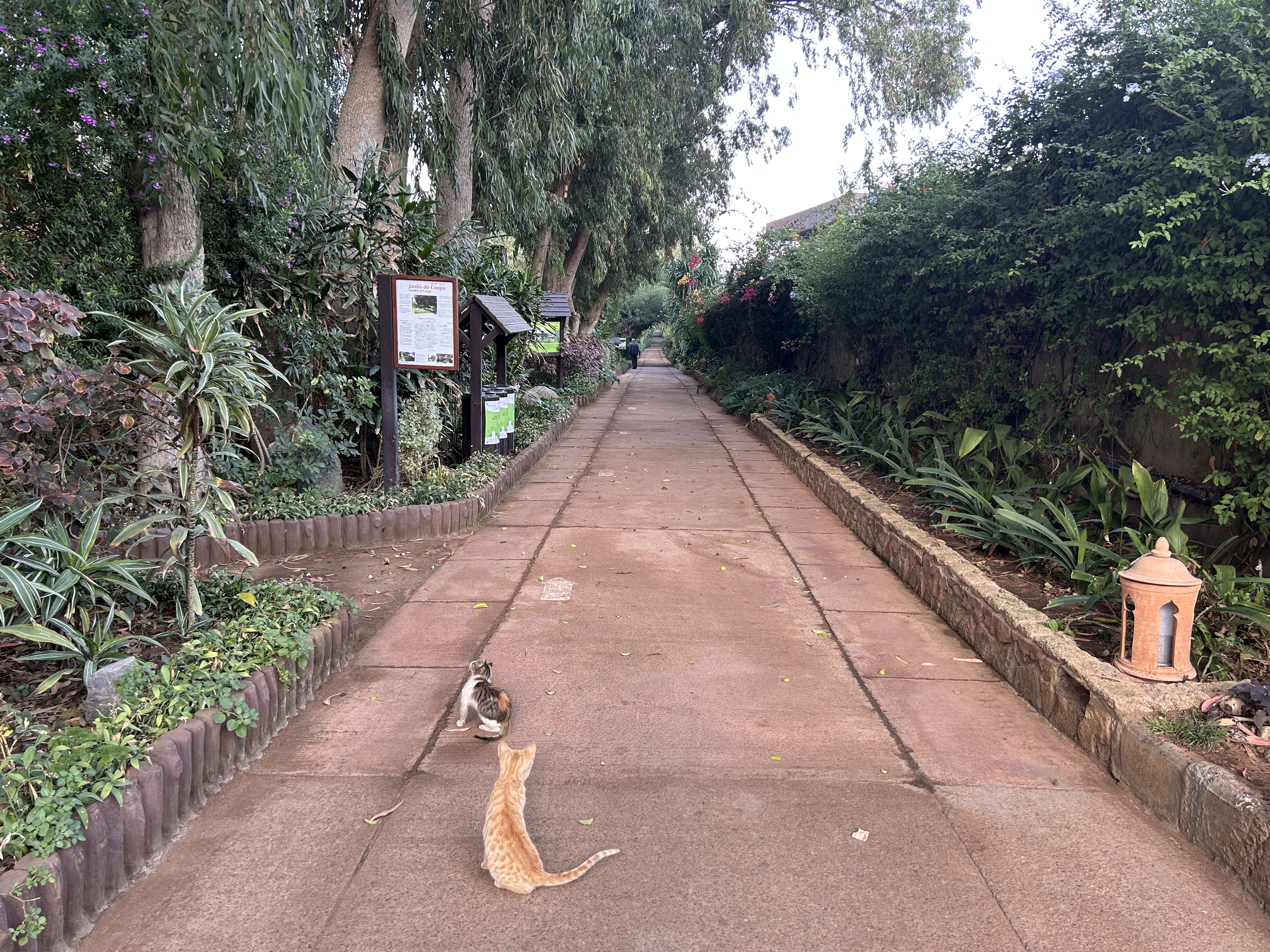
Exotic gardens of Bouknadel

Bouknadel became a prime tourism place for foreigners with the development of the beach front property and community developed by prestige the development includes beach front property's on the plage de nations, a PSG soccer training camp, a shopping center and more still in development. Bouknadel is also home to Morocco's arboretum the Exotiques De Bouknadel.

== See also ==
- Salé
- Rabat
- Kenitra
- Sidi Taibi
