= Mnasra =

- Rural commune and town
- Interactive map of Mnasra
- Coordinates: 34.3603°N 6.5508°W
- Country: Morocco
- Region: Rabat-Salé-Kénitra
- Province: Kénitra

Population (2004)
  - Total: 29,354
- Time zone: UTC+0 (GMT)

Mnasra is a small town and rural commune in Kénitra Province, Rabat-Salé-Kénitra, Morocco. At the time of the 2004 census, the commune had a total population of 29,354 people living in 4088 households.
