= Ben Mansour =

Ben Mansour بنمنصور
- Rural commune and town
- Interactive map of Ben Mansour
- Coordinates: 34°30′50″N 6°25′30″W
- Country: Morocco
- Region: Rabat-Salé-Kénitra
- Province: Kénitra

Population (2004)
  - Total: 51,874
- Time zone: UTC+0 (GMT)

Ben Mansour is a small town and rural commune in Kénitra Province of the Rabat-Salé-Kénitra region of Morocco. At the time of the 2004 census, the commune had a total population of 51,874 people living in 6964 households.
