= Sidi Allal Tazi =

Sidi Allal Tazi سيدي علال التازي
- Town
- Location in Morocco
- Coordinates: 34°31′11″N 6°19′25″W
- Country: Morocco
- Region: Rabat-Salé-Kénitra
- Province: Kénitra

Government
  - Mayor: Hatim Barkia (Istiqlal)

Population (2004)
  - Total: 3,140
- Time zone: UTC+0 (GMT)

Sidi Allal Tazi is a town in Kénitra Province, Rabat-Salé-Kénitra, in northwestern Morocco. According to the 2004 census, it has a population of 3,140.
