= Bahhara Oulad Ayad =

Bahhara Oulad Ayad بحارة أولاد عياد
- Rural commune and town
- Location within Morocco
- Coordinates: 34.7702°N 6.3047°W
- Country: Morocco
- Region: Rabat-Salé-Kénitra
- Province: Kénitra

Population (2004)
  - Total: 27,488
- Time zone: UTC+0 (GMT)

Bahhara Oulad Ayad is a small town and rural commune in Kénitra Province of the Rabat-Salé-Kénitra region of Morocco. At the time of the 2004 census, the commune had a total population of 27,488 people living in 3722 households.
