= Mograne =

- Rural commune and town
- Location within Morocco
- Coordinates: 34°25′N 6°26′W
- Country: Morocco
- Region: Rabat-Salé-Kénitra
- Province: Kénitra

Population (2004)
  - Total: 26,966
- Time zone: UTC+0 (GMT)

Mograne is a small town and rural commune in Kénitra Province of the Rabat-Salé-Kénitra region of Morocco. At the time of the 2004 census, the commune had a total population of 26,966 people living in 3767 households.
