= Moulay Bousselham =

Moulay Bousselham مولاي بوسلهام
- Town
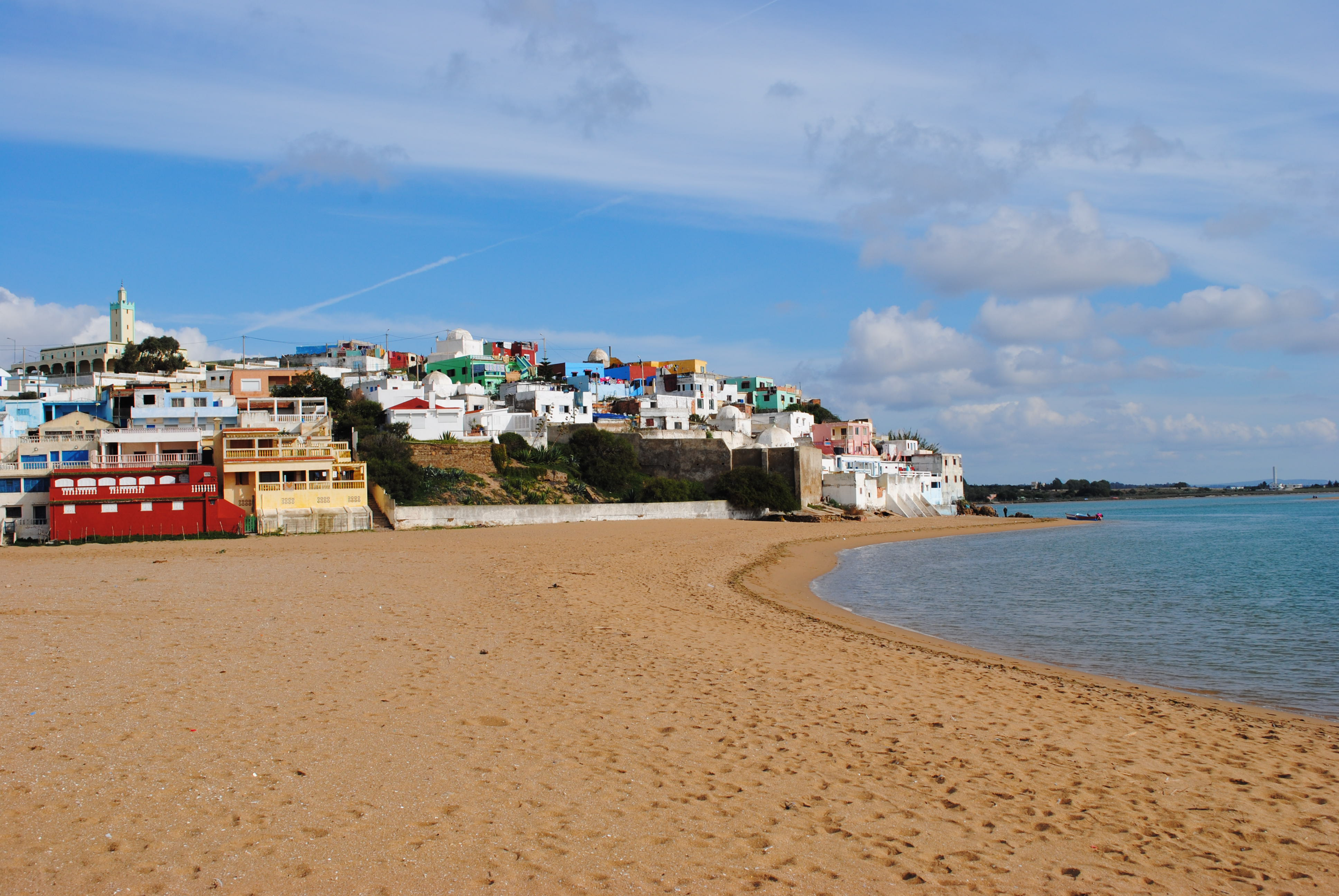
- Interactive map of Moulay Bousselham
- Coordinates: 34.8786°N 6.29333°W
- Country: Morocco
- Region: Rabat-Salé-Kénitra
- Province: Kénitra

Population (2004)
  - Total: 5,693
- Time zone: UTC+0 (GMT)

Moulay Bousselham (Arabic: مولاي بوسلهام, romanized: Mūlāy Bū Salhām) is a town in Kénitra Province, Rabat-Salé-Kénitra, Morocco. At the 2004 census, its population was 5,693.

== Etymology ==
The town get its name from a Sufi saint Moulay Bousselham, originally from Egypt, whose shrine is a popular pilgrimage sight.

== History ==
In the center of local history are the (partly legendary) episodes about a man who came from Egypt in the middle of the 16th century and was killed in the Battle of the Three Kings (August 4, 1578). He was then buried in the coastal town, which resulted in several miracles. Later, a small mausoleum (koubba) was built over his grave, which is visited by many pilgrims every summer. As a result, other "holy men" came here, whose dome tombs are scattered across the town.

Since the 1960s, the fishing village has developed into a seaside resort, where today many Moroccans, but also Europeans, spend a few hours or days on the beach.
