= Kenitra Province =

Coordinates: 34.267359°N 6.575593°W

Kenitra Province إقليم القنيطرة ⵜⴰⵙⴳⴰ ⵏ ⵍⵇⵏⵉⵟⵕⴰ
- Province
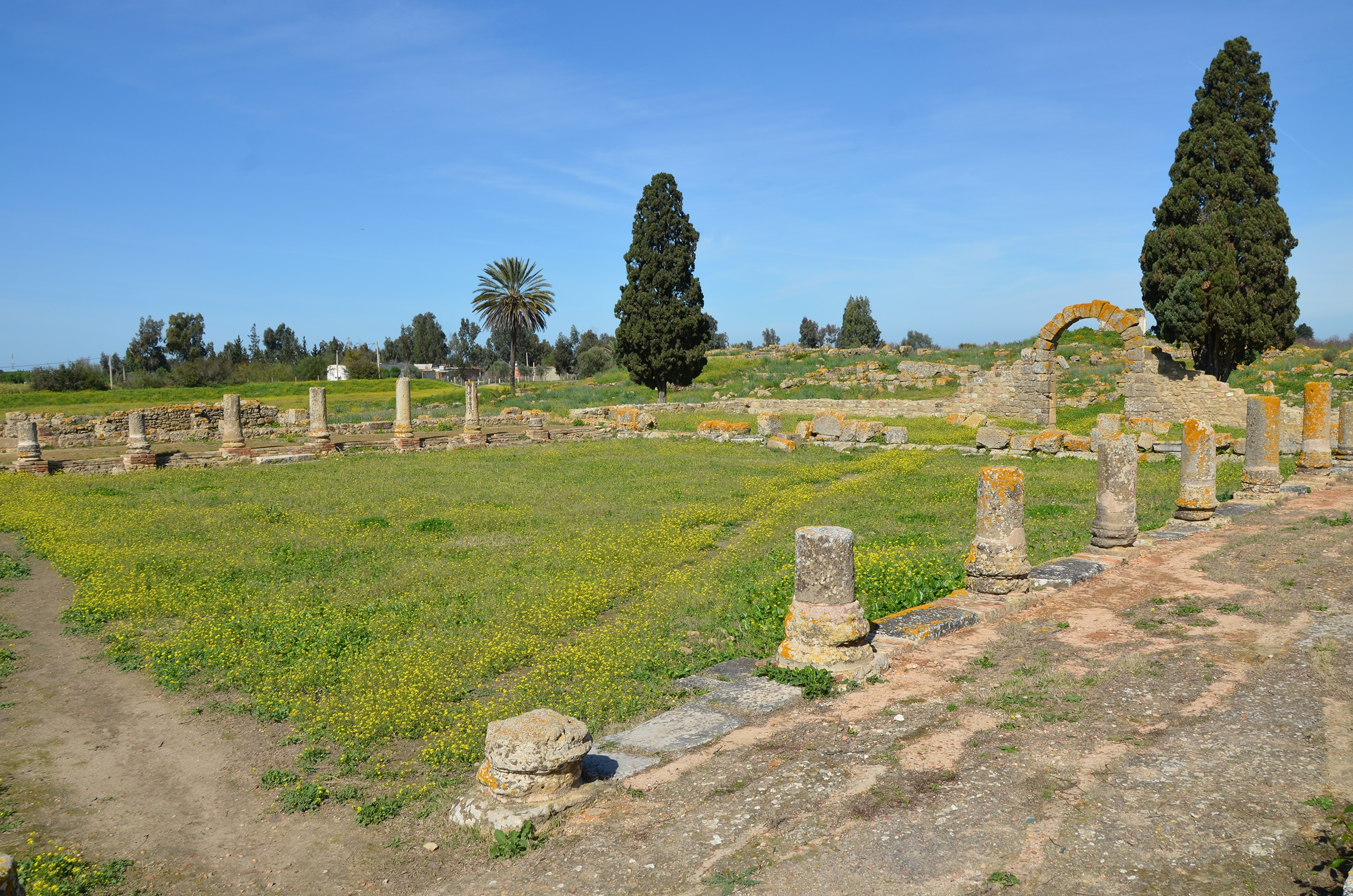
- Ruins of Iulia Valentia Banasa

- Flag Seal
- Country: Morocco
- Region: Rabat-Salé-Kénitra
- Administrative headquarters: Kenitra

Area
  - Total: 3,052 km^{2} (1,178 sq mi)

Population (2024)
  - Total: 1,284,247
  - Density: 420.8/km^{2} (1,090/sq mi)
- Time zone: UTC+0 (GMT)

Kenitra Province (القنيطرة, ⵍⵇⵏⵉⵟⵕⴰ) is an administrative subdivision of Morocco, located in the Rabat-Salé-Kénitra region. It takes its name from its capital, the city of Kenitra. It is the most populous Province of Morocco.

The major cities and towns are:

- Kenitra
- Souk El Arbaa
- Sidi Taibi
- Mehdya
- Moulay Bousselham

== Geography ==
Kenitra Province is situated along the Atlantic coast, north of Rabat. It lies within the Gharb Plain, one of the country’s most important agricultural regions.

Its area, originally 4,745 square kilometres (1,832 sq mi), was reduced to 3,253 square kilometres (1,256 sq mi) following the creation of Sidi Slimane Province in 2009 from part of its territory.

The province is characterized by generally flat terrain and is crossed by the Sebou River, which plays a key role in irrigation and agricultural development.

== History ==
The territory of present-day Kenitra Province has long been associated with agriculture and trade due to the fertile lands of the Gharb Plain and the presence of the Sebou River.

The city of Kenitra developed as an important port and administrative center. Since 1956, it experienced rapid urban and industrial growth.

In 2009, the creation of Sidi Slimane Province led to a reduction in its territorial extent and administrative reorganization.

Since the territorial reform of 2015, Kenitra Province has been part of the Rabat-Salé-Kénitra region.

== Heraldry ==
Small coat of arms	Large coat of arms	Description
		The coat of arms of Kenitra Province is described as follows: “Gules, a bend or charged with a gear vert, accompanied by two sheaves of wheat of the same, one in chief and one in base, within a bordure of the same charged with twelve trees. The shield is topped with the Moroccan royal crown.”

== Subdivisions ==
The province is divided administratively into the following:

Name	Geographic code	Type	Households	Population (2014)	Foreign population	Moroccan population	Notes
Kenitra	281.01.01.	Municipality	102,177	431,282	1,587	429,695	Chef-lieu
Mehdya	281.01.05.	Municipality	6,653	28,636	74	28,562	
Souk El Arbaa	281.01.11.	Municipality	14,268	69,265	28	69,237	
Ameur Seflia	281.03.01.	Rural commune	4,882	28,540	5	28,535	
Haddada	281.03.05.	Rural commune	2,758	15,898	3	15,895	
Mnasra	281.05.07.	Rural commune	5,360	34,429	2	34,427	
Oulad Slama	281.03.11.	Rural commune	3,135	19,488	11	19,477	
Sidi Taibi	281.03.13.	Rural commune	11,518	53,449	7	53,442	
Ben Mansour	281.05.03.	Rural commune	6,698	43,822	4	43,818	
Mograne	281.05.09.	Rural commune	5,260	31,292	2	31,290	
Arbaoua	281.07.01.	Rural commune	6,023	32,690	0	32,690	3,050 residents live in the center, called Arbaoua; 29,640 live in rural areas.
Beni Malek	281.07.03.	Rural commune	4,306	26,098	2	26,096	
Kariat Ben Aouda	281.07.05.	Rural commune	1,924	11,087	1	11,086	
Oued El Makhazine	281.07.07.	Rural commune	1,606	7,266	0	7,266	
Bahhara Oulad Ayad	281.09.01.	Rural commune	5,297	31,860	0	31,860	
Sidi Allal Tazi	281.09.09.	Rural commune	3,098	18,055	0	18,055	4,870 residents live in the center, called Sidi Allal Tazi; 13,185 live in rural areas.
Sidi Mohamed Lahmar	281.09.13.	Rural commune	6,358	42,637	3	342,634	
Souk Tlet El Gharb	281.09.15.	Rural commune	3,614	22,554	3	22,551	
Chouafaa	281.11.03.	Rural commune	3,072	18,436	2	18,432	
Lalla Mimouna	281.11.05.	Rural commune	5,309	29,479	0	2,479	15,767 residents live in the center, called Lalla Mimouna; 13,712 residents live in rural areas.
Moulay Bousselham	281.11.07.	Rural commune	5,026	26,608	63	26,545	7,372 residents live in the center, called Moulay Bousselham; 19,236 live in rural areas.
Sidi Boubker El Haj	281.11.11.	Rural commune	3,149	19,327	13	19,314	
