= Mohamed Sijelmassi =

Moroccan writer and physician

Mohamed Sijelmassi (1932, Kenitra – 17 October 2007, Casablanca) was a Moroccan writer and physician. He is the author of several books on art, Moroccan culture and islamic heritage.

== Works (selection) ==
- 1972: La Peinture marocaine
- 1974: Les Arts traditionnels
- 1975: La Mamounia, Marrakech
- 1985: Enfants du Maghreb entre hier et aujourd'hui
- Les Arts traditionnels au Maroc
- Enluminures des manuscrits royaux au Maroc
- 1998: L'Art contemporain au Maroc.
- 1991: Fès : Cité de l'art et du savoir, Courbevoie, ACR Édition
- 1993: Le Guide des parents
- 1996: L'Art calligraphique de l'Islam, (coauthor : Abdelkebir Khatibi)
- 1996: Civilisation marocaine, (coauthor: Abdelkébir Khatibi; translated into German, English and Italian)
- 1997: Mémoire du Maroc
- 1999: Le Désir du Maroc, Paris, Marval, (coauthor: Alain D'Hooghe; pref. Tahar Ben Jelloun)
- 2003: Les Arts traditionnels marocains
- 2003: Casablanca que j'aime
- 2007: Maroc Méditerranée, de Tanger à Saidia

== See also ==
- List of Moroccan writers
