= Kenitra =

City in Rabat-Salé-Kénitra, Morocco

Kenitra القنيطرة (Arabic) ⵍⵇⵏⵉⵟⵕⴰ (Standard Moroccan Tamazight)
- city
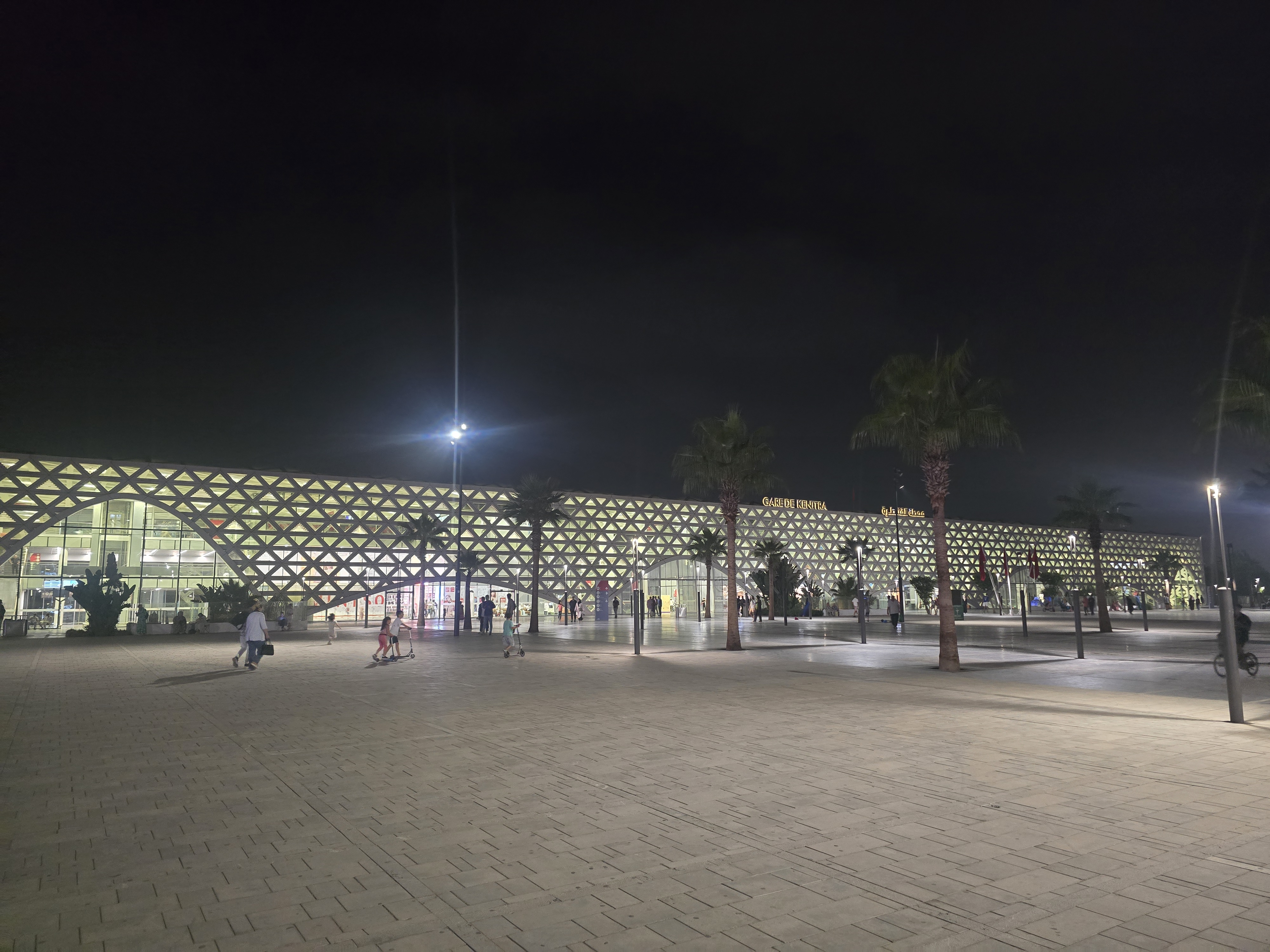
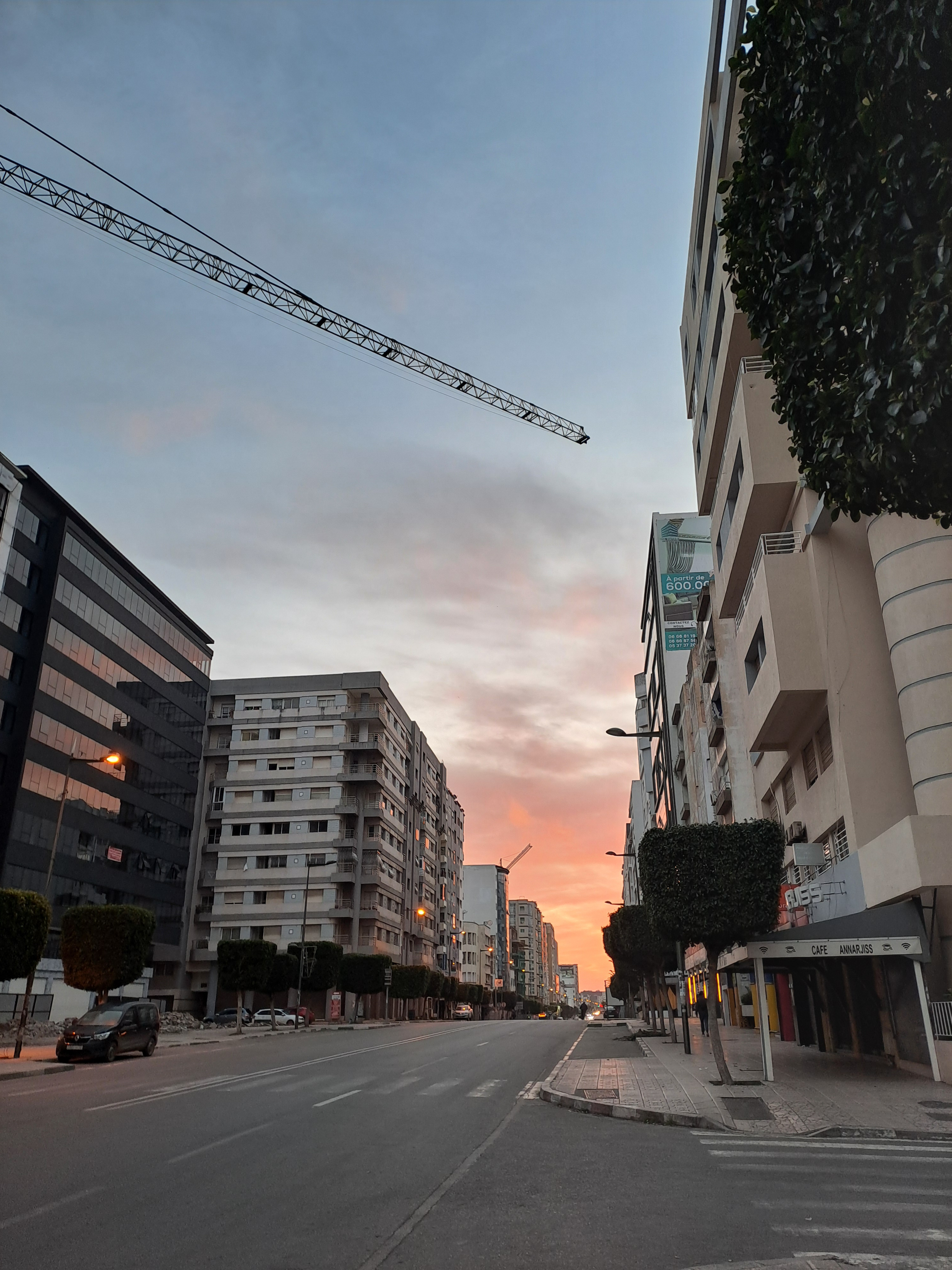
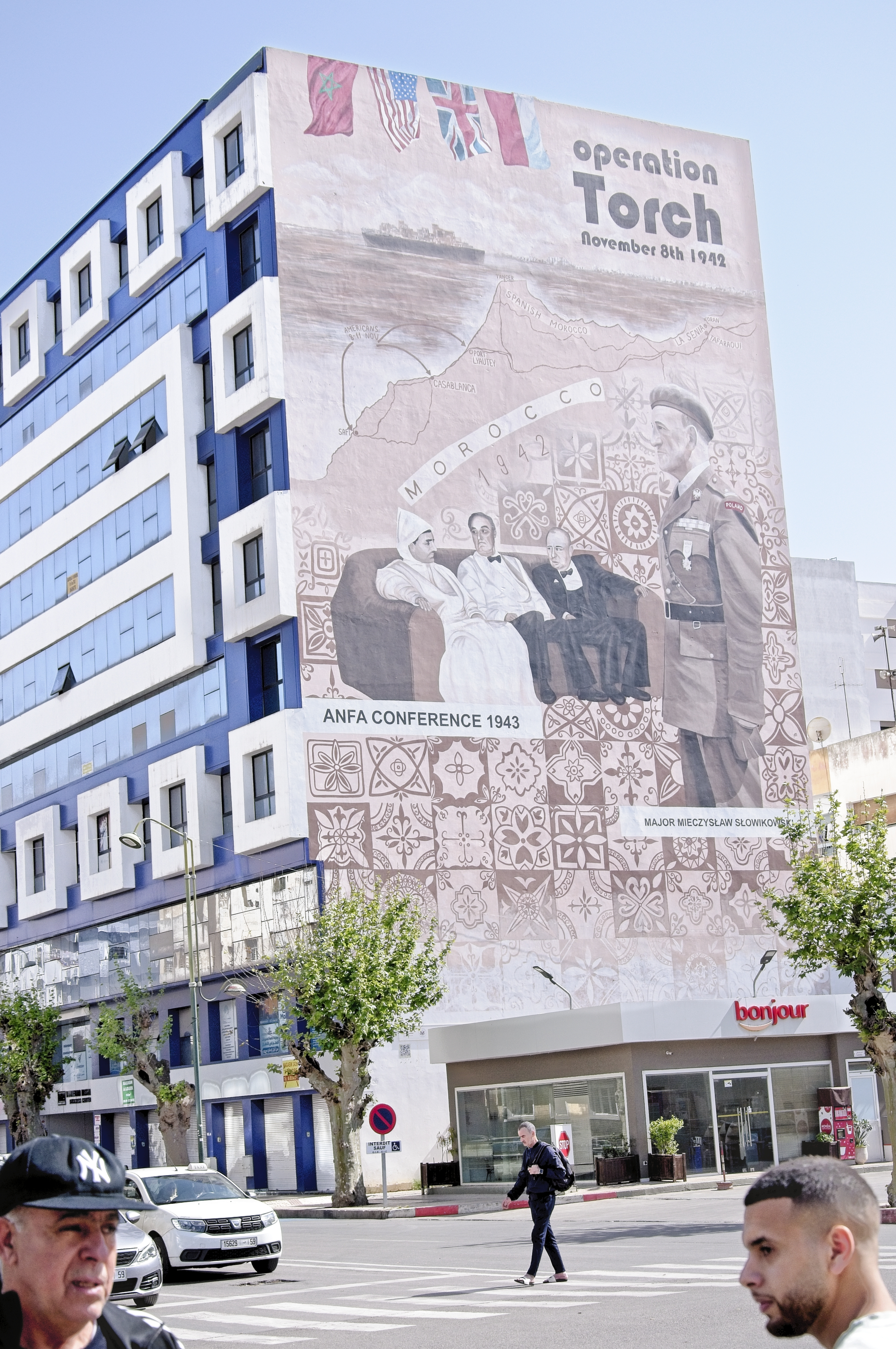
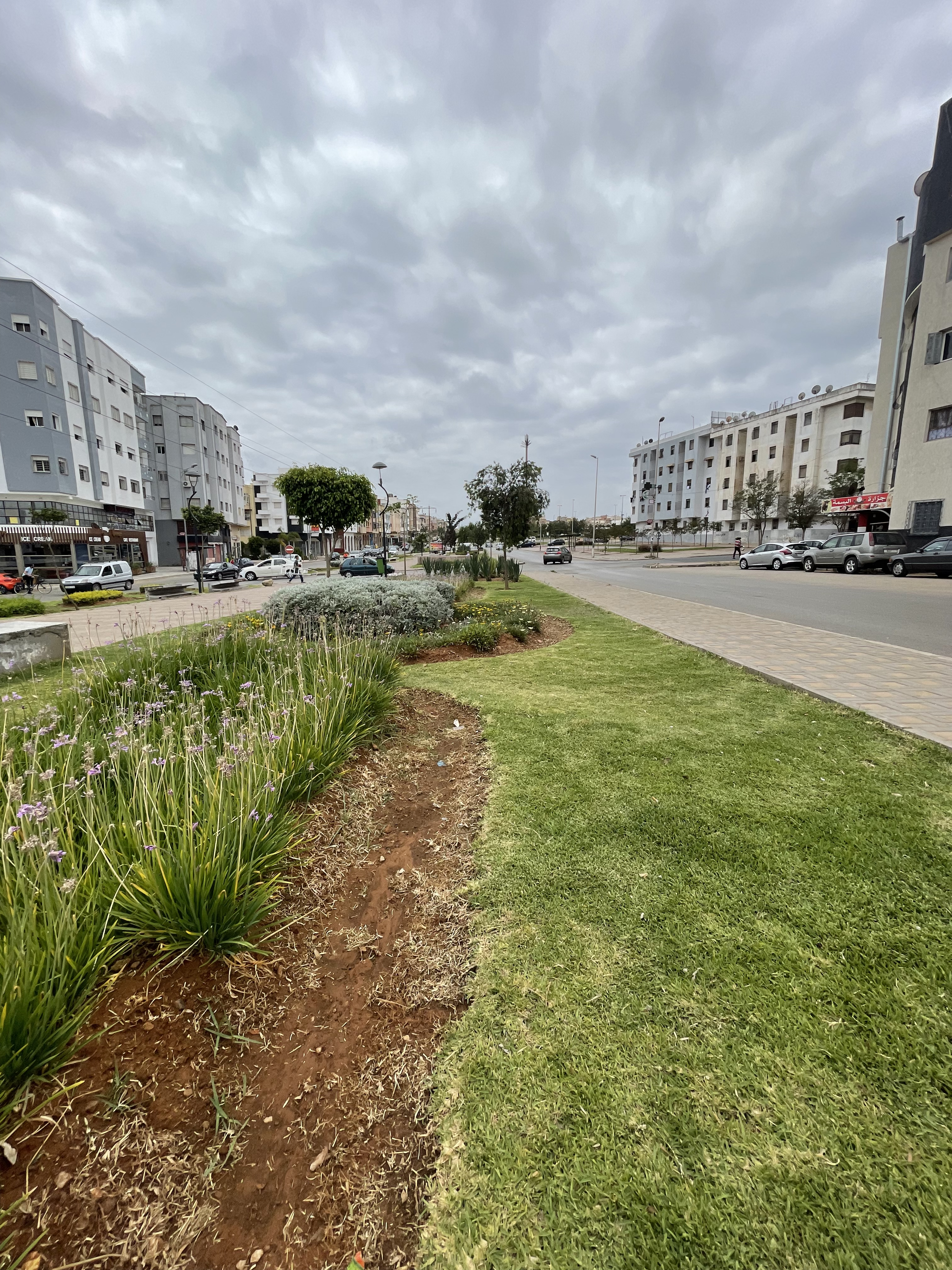
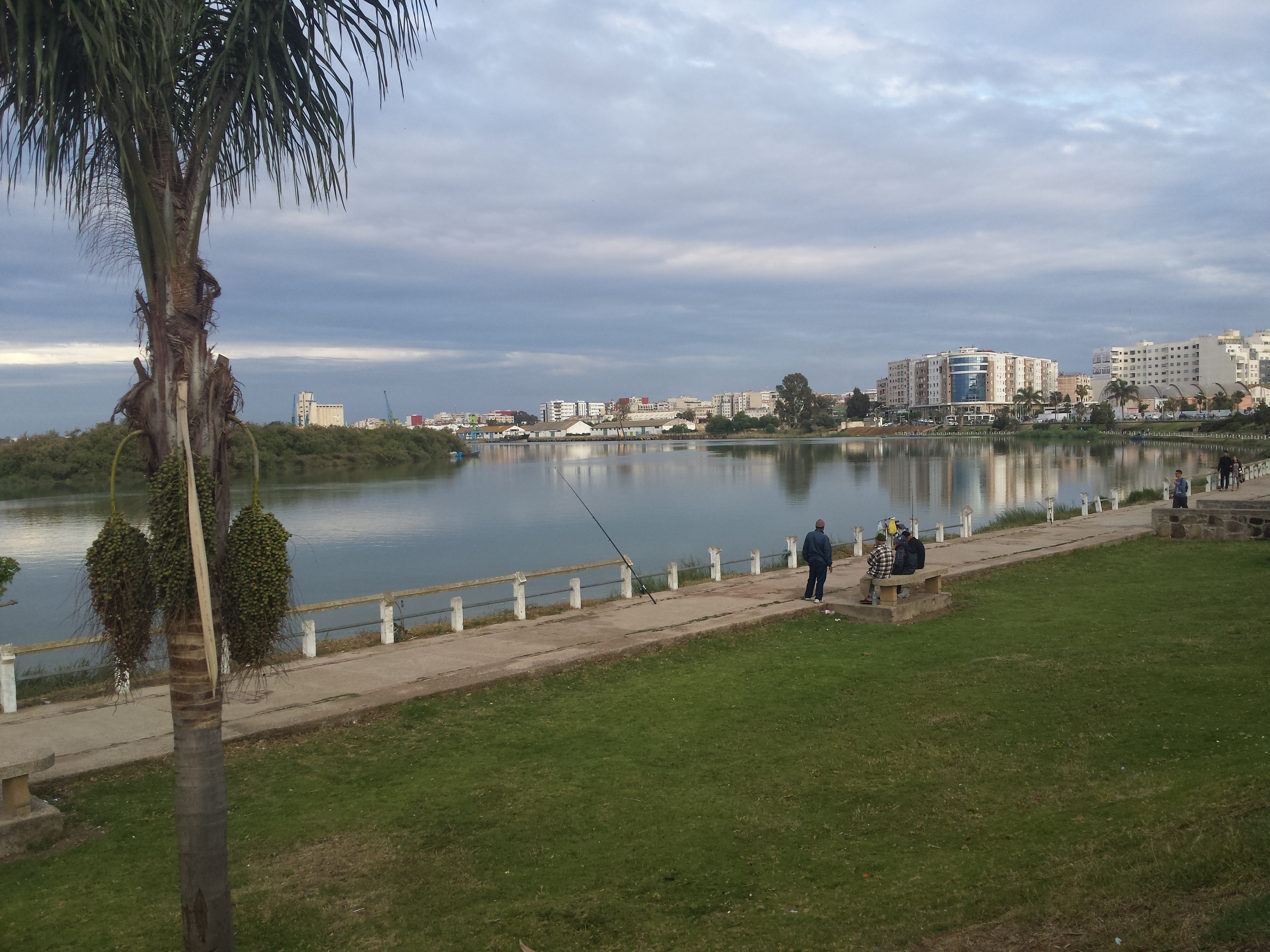

- Flag Seal
- Interactive map of Kenitra
- Coordinates: 34°15′N 6°35′W
- Country: Morocco
- Region: Rabat-Salé-Kénitra
- Province: Kenitra

Government
  - Mayor: Mina Hrouza (RNI)

Population (2024)
  - Total: 507,736
  - Rank: 8th in Morocco
- Time zone: UTC+0 (GMT)
- Postal code: 14000
- Website: http://www.kenitra.ma

Kenitra (Note: Arabic: القُنَيْطَرَة, al-qunayṭara, [alqunajtˤira], lit. 'the little bridge' Standard Moroccan Tamazight: ⵍⵇⵏⵉⵟⵕⴰ) is a city in northwestern Morocco. It is a major urban center on the mouth of the Sebou River with a population of 507,736 as of 2024, with Mehdya counting an additional 58,558.

It is one of the three main cities of the Rabat-Salé-Kénitra region and serves as the primary industrial hub for the region. it is also the capital and namesake of Kénitra Province.

During the Cold War, the US Naval Air Station Port Lyautey served as an important stopping point in North Africa, by 1977 the base was fully handed over to the Royal Moroccan Air Force as Kenitra Air Base.

The historic coastal town of Mehdya is administered as a separate urban commune within Kénitra Province, though it is functionally integrated as a coastal district of the city of Kenitra.

== History ==
=== Ancient history ===
The history of the city begins with the foundation of a trading post by Carthaginian explorer Hanno. It was known back then as Thamusida.

=== Colonial and recent history ===
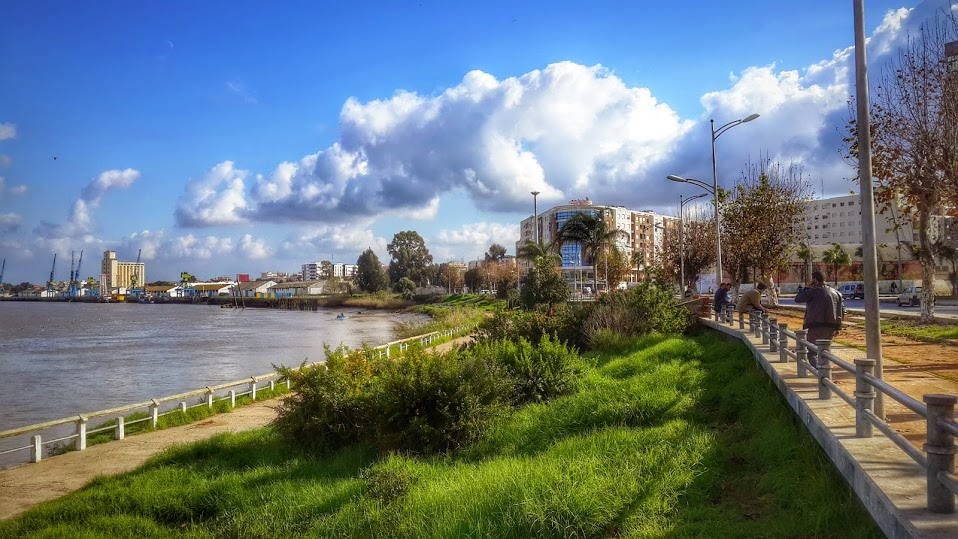
Sebou River - Corniche

After the French conquest of Morocco, One of Hubert Lyautey's first preoccupations as resident general was to build ports along the inhabitable Atlantic coast where there were no natural harbors. He established Port Lyautey in 1912 as a French military fort and town. Its port, at the mouth of the Sebou river, was opened in 1913. It soon became the best river port in Morocco.

Kenitra draws its name from a bridge built at Fouarat lake upstream of the kasbah by the Makhzen's Qaid Ali Ouaddi after the Siege of La Mamora (1681). This bridge was destroyed in 1928 by the colonial authorities. In 1933, the French officially named the locale "Port Lyautey".

It was renamed "Kenitra" in 1956 as Morocco gained its independence. The city has grown rapidly to be a shipping centre for agricultural produce (mainly fruit), fish, timber, and lead and zinc ores. The city's industrial area lies upstream of the port.

=== U.S. Naval Base ===
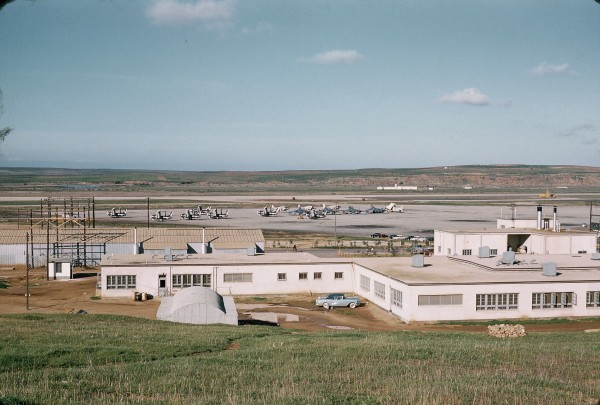
Air base of Kenitra: Public works and maintenance department c. 1960

In November 1942, after Operation Torch, the Americans captured the Port Lyautey French fighter base as a military base, named Craw Field. For three months the 21st Engineer Aviation Regiment worked on the airfield. In February 1943 the Seabees of the 120th Naval Construction Battalion took over all construction activities. The Navy ran the base until 1947, when the State Department negotiated reversion of control to France. In 1950, a $23,000,000 expansion was authorized, but then the Korean War diverted resources. In the 1950s, nearly 10,000 people were on the base making it the largest aggregation of Americans in any one overseas base outside Japan. Later, the base in Kenitra was expanded to become a U.S. Naval Air Station.

The base was shared by both the US and Morocco through the Cold War. A small Navy communications out-station in Sidi Yahia closed in the late 1970s. The Air Station was closed in 1991.

== Climate ==
Kenitra has a hot-summer Mediterranean climate (Köppen climate classification Csa).

In summer, there are 27.4 days on average in which the maximum daily temperature is at 30.0 °C (86.0 °F) or higher, and 1.6 days with max temperature above 40.0 °C (104.0 °F). Winters are mild and rainy, with sub-freezing temperatures occurring only 0.3 days per year on average. The highest recorded temperature was 47.7 °C (117.9 °F) on 1 August 2003, and the coldest was −3.0 °C (26.6 °F) on 13 February 2012.

Climate data for Kenitra (normals and extremes 1940–2025, sun 1981-2010, rainy days 1961-1990)
Month	Jan	Feb	Mar	Apr	May	Jun	Jul	Aug	Sep	Oct	Nov	Dec	Year
Record high °C (°F)	24.8 (76.6)	32.2 (90.0)	35.1 (95.2)	36.5 (97.7)	43.7 (110.7)	46.3 (115.3)	46.1 (115.0)	47.7 (117.9)	44.6 (112.3)	39.9 (103.8)	33.5 (92.3)	26.0 (78.8)	47.7 (117.9)
Mean maximum °C (°F)	21.5 (70.7)	23.7 (74.7)	26.9 (80.4)	28.8 (83.8)	31.6 (88.9)	34.8 (94.6)	34.9 (94.8)	35.0 (95.0)	32.8 (91.0)	30.8 (87.4)	26.3 (79.3)	21.9 (71.4)	36.90 (98.42)
Mean daily maximum °C (°F)	17.1 (62.8)	18.8 (65.8)	19.8 (67.6)	21.1 (70.0)	23.7 (74.7)	25.2 (77.4)	27.9 (82.2)	28.7 (83.7)	26.1 (79.0)	24.9 (76.8)	21.6 (70.9)	18.4 (65.1)	22.8 (73.0)
Daily mean °C (°F)	13.2 (55.8)	14.2 (57.6)	15.2 (59.4)	16.8 (62.2)	19.3 (66.7)	21.3 (70.3)	23.8 (74.8)	24.7 (76.5)	22.4 (72.3)	20.3 (68.5)	17.2 (63.0)	14.4 (57.9)	18.6 (65.4)
Mean daily minimum °C (°F)	9.2 (48.6)	9.5 (49.1)	10.5 (50.9)	12.5 (54.5)	14.9 (58.8)	17.3 (63.1)	19.6 (67.3)	20.6 (69.1)	18.6 (65.5)	15.6 (60.1)	12.8 (55.0)	10.4 (50.7)	14.3 (57.7)
Mean minimum °C (°F)	5.0 (41.0)	6.2 (43.2)	7.6 (45.7)	9.7 (49.5)	11.3 (52.3)	15.1 (59.2)	16.4 (61.5)	16.9 (62.4)	15.8 (60.4)	13.0 (55.4)	8.7 (47.7)	6.6 (43.9)	5.29 (41.52)
Record low °C (°F)	−1.0 (30.2)	−3.0 (26.6)	1.0 (33.8)	1.7 (35.1)	6.6 (43.9)	10.5 (50.9)	12.8 (55.0)	2.2 (36.0)	1.7 (35.1)	2.1 (35.8)	1.7 (35.1)	−0.5 (31.1)	−3.0 (26.6)
Average precipitation mm (inches)	82 (3.2)	64 (2.5)	63 (2.5)	57 (2.2)	32 (1.3)	8 (0.3)	1 (0.0)	1 (0.0)	21 (0.8)	63 (2.5)	94 (3.7)	85 (3.3)	571 (22.3)
Average snowfall cm (inches)	0.0 (0.0)	0.0 (0.0)	0.0 (0.0)	0.0 (0.0)	0.0 (0.0)	0.0 (0.0)	0.0 (0.0)	0.0 (0.0)	0.0 (0.0)	0.0 (0.0)	0.0 (0.0)	0.0 (0.0)	0 (0)
Average precipitation days (≥ 1 mm)	6	6	5	6	4	1	0	0	3	5	7	7	50
Average rainy days	12.3	12.7	12.2	11	7.6	2.9	0.3	0.7	2.8	8.6	13.3	14	98.4
Average snowy days	0.0	0.0	0.0	0.0	0.0	0.0	0.0	0.0	0.0	0.0	0.0	0.0	0
Average relative humidity (%)	80	77	75	75	72	73	75	76	76	78	77	78	76
Average dew point °C (°F)	9.38 (48.88)	9.74 (49.53)	10.77 (51.39)	11.76 (53.17)	13.61 (56.50)	16.08 (60.94)	17.96 (64.33)	18.68 (65.62)	17.81 (64.06)	15.52 (59.94)	12.50 (54.50)	10.37 (50.67)	8.4 (47.1)
Mean monthly sunshine hours	182.9	184.8	244.9	270.0	313.1	318.0	347.2	331.7	282.0	248.0	195.0	182.9	3,090.5
Percentage possible sunshine	57.9	60.0	66.4	69.2	72.6	73.1	78.3	79.9	75.8	70.8	61.9	59.0	69.4
Source: Weather2Visit (moyennes mensuelles); WeatherSpark (températures moyennes); Visual Crossing (historique météorologique); Climate-Data.org (moyennes mensuelles, 1991–2021); Open-Meteo (données de réanalyse historiques)

Climate data for Kenitra (1991-2020)
Month	Jan	Feb	Mar	Apr	May	Jun	Jul	Aug	Sep	Oct	Nov	Dec	Year
Mean number of days with thunder	1.9	1.4	2.0	1.6	1.3	0.5	0.7	0.4	1.1	1.4	2.2	1.9	16.4
Number of days with wind speed > 10 m/s (36 km/h)	9.6	10.5	16.7	20.7	24.4	24.1	22.5	21.8	20.3	14.2	10.3	9.7	204.8

== Population ==
Kenitra Population
Year	1994	2004	2014	2024
Pop.	292,453	352,058	423,890	507,736
±% p.a.	—	+1.87%	+1.87%	+1.82%
Census data from 1994, 2004, 2014 and 2024

== Areas and neighbourhoods ==
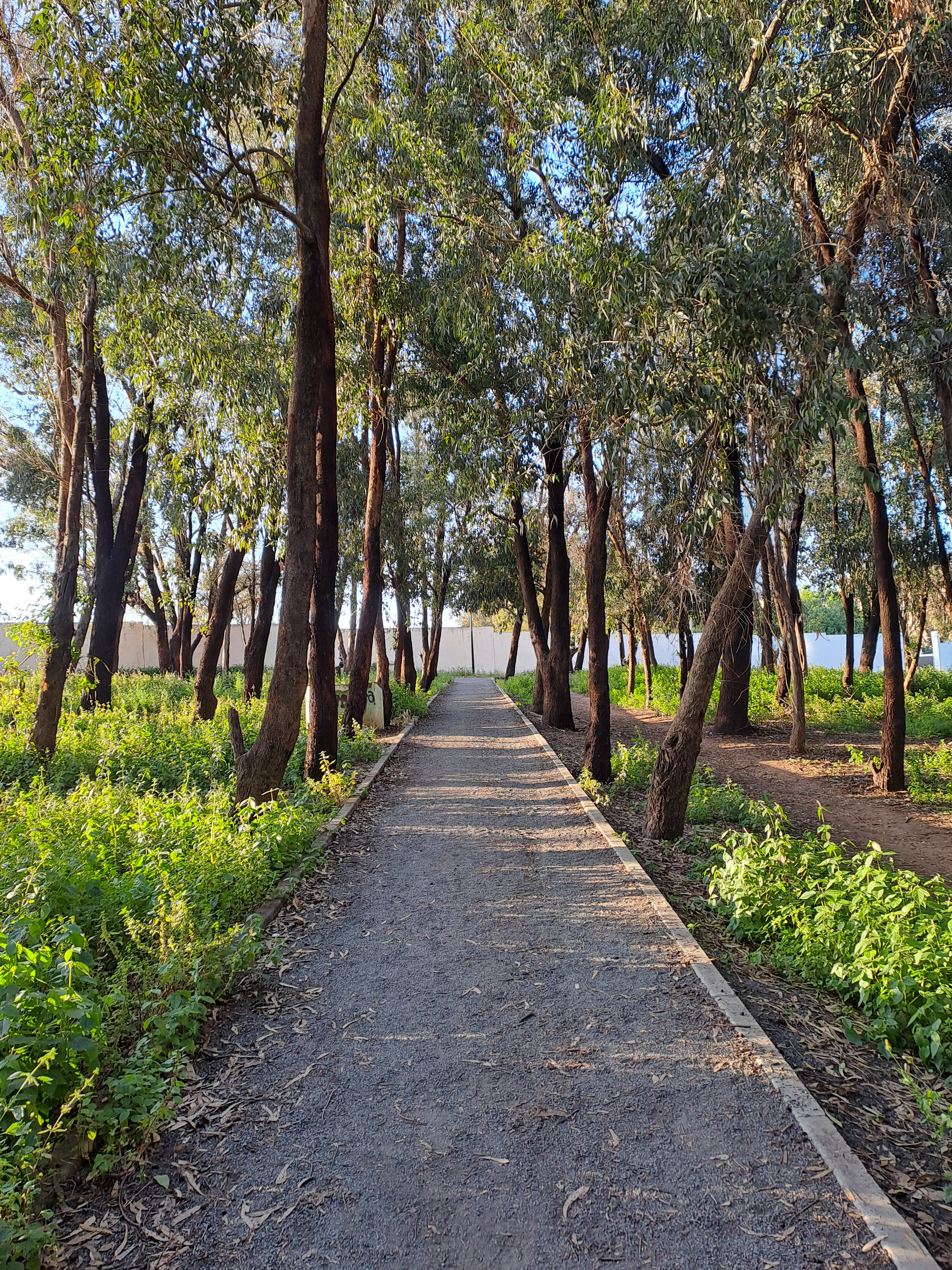
Park in Bir Rami

- Mdina
  - Khabazate
  - The Cigogne
  - La cité
- Modern city
  - Mimosa
  - La ville haute
- Popular districts
  - Saknia
  - Ouled Oujih
  - Sayad
  - Haouzia
  - Haddada
  - Maghrib al Arabi
- Residential districts
  - Bir Rami
  - Ismailia
  - Val fleuri

== Education ==
=== Colleges and universities ===
- Université Ibn-Tofail (UIT)
- ENCG Kénitra (École nationale de commerce et de gestion de Kénitra)
- ENSA Kénitra (École nationale des sciences appliquées de Kénitra)
- ENSC Kénitra (École nationale supérieure de chimie de Kénitra)
- FMPMD Kénitra (Faculté de Médecine, de Pharmacie et de Médecine Dentaire)
- HECI Kénitra (Hautes Etudes Commerciales et Informatiques)

== Transportation ==
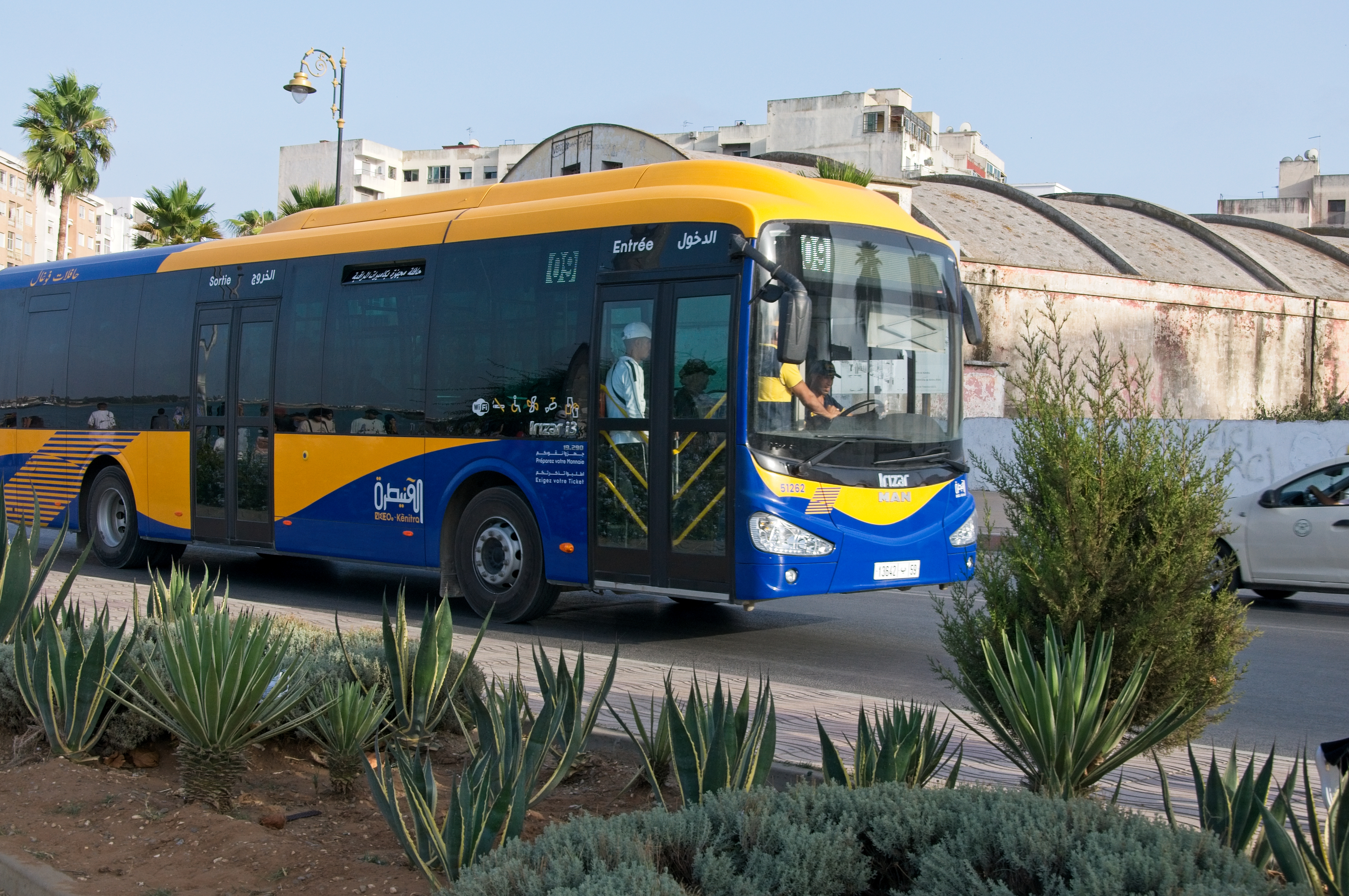
A city bus (Irizar i3) operated by Foughal Bus Kénitra runs along the Sebou River, on 17/07/2022

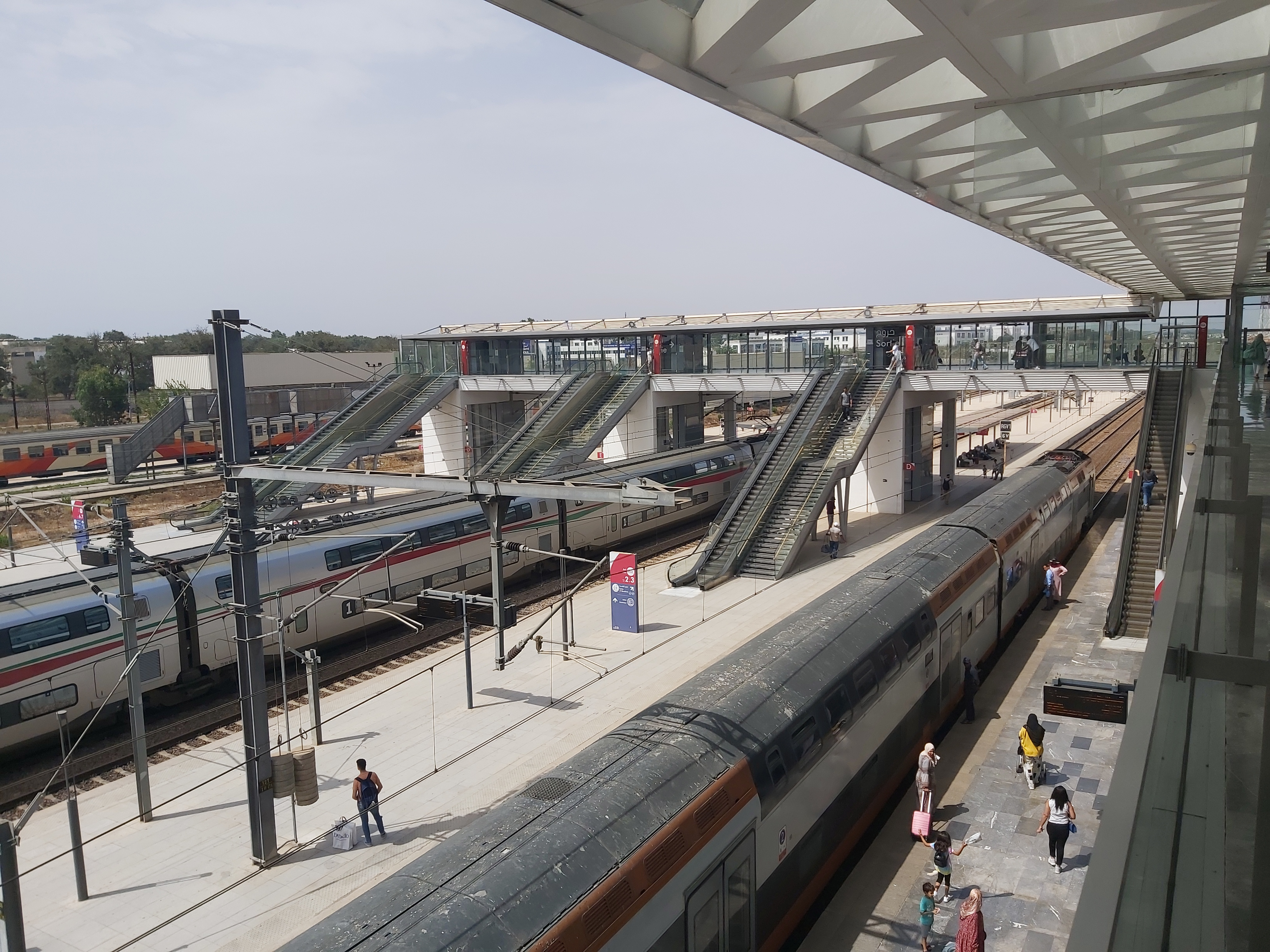
Trains at Kenitra's railway station

=== Motorway ===
The National Route 1 and the A1 motorway pass through Kenitra and connect it to Rabat-Salé in the south-west and to Larache in the north-east.

=== Rail ===
The city is served by one railway station: Kenitra-Ville.

A shuttle train, TNR, connects the city, every 30 minutes, to Rabat and Casablanca, other stops include Salé, Bouznika and Mohammedia.

A high-speed rail line to Tangier was completed in 2018. (See Kenitra–Tangier high-speed rail line.)

Standard intercity trains run on a fully electrified line traversing east with stops at Sidi Yahya El Gharb, Sidi Slimane, Sidi Kacem, Meknes, Ain Taoujdate and Fes.

An in progress Regional Express Network (RER) project aims to enhance urban mobility across the Rabat-Salé-Kénitra region. The line covers a 54 km corridor connecting Kenitra to Skhirat, with stops in Salé, Rabat and Temara across 12 stations. The complete journey along the line will take approximately 1 hour and 10 minutes, operating at 15 minute intervals. with completion targeted ahead of the 2030 FIFA World Cup.

== Sports ==
=== Kénitra Athletic Club, KAC ===
In 1938, a group of Kénitra natives created KAC. This group of soccer lovers wanted to resist French domination in sports in Morocco. The team, made entirely of Kénitra natives, succeeded in reaching the premier Moroccan soccer league in 1956. In 1960, KAC won its first championship league of Morocco. KAC embarked in a journey of glories by winning the 1973-81-82 championship leagues and the 1961 throne cup. Ahmed Souiri was a long-time manager and coach. KAC has produced many international players. Noureddine Bouyahyaoui and Labid Khalifa were among the players who helped the Moroccan national soccer team qualify for the second round of the World Cup finals in Mexico in 1986. Mohammed Boussati still holds a national record of goals by scoring 25 goals in one soccer championship season in 1981–82.
Its home is the Kenitra Municipal Stadium which has a capacity of 15,000 people.

=== Basketball ===
The Kénitra AC was a successful basketball team during the 70s and 80s.

== Environment ==
=== Maamora Forest ===
Sidi-Boughaba forest and Lagooon

Bordering Kenitra to the south, the Maamora Forest is the world's largest contiguous Quercus suber (Cork Oak) forest, spanning an estimated area of over 133,000 hectares. The forest ecosystem plays a critical environmental role in protecting Morocco's Atlantic coastal plain against soil erosion and desertification.

However, the forest faces severe ecological degradation and fragmentation. Satellite and spatial monitoring show a marked decline in native cork oak cover, in the period of 1989-2022 natural forest cover declined by 8.15% per decade, while plantation forests and bare land increased by 4.50% and 312.5% per decade, respectively. This regression is largely driven by anthropogenic pressures, including rapid urban expansion, legal and illegal wood harvesting, chronic overgrazing, and the replacement of native species with fast-growing monoculture plantations of Eucalyptus, Pine and Acacia. Coupled with recurrent droughts and fragile sandy soils, these pressures significantly hinder the forest's natural regeneration capacity.

=== Water Highway project ===
In response to regional water stress and prolonged drought, Morocco constructed a major $728 million initiative known as the "Water Highway" to redirect surplus water from the Sebou River basin toward the country's central and southern urban centers. As part of this project, a diversion dam and key pumping facilities were established north of Kenitra. The installation captures the surplus flow of the Sebou River before it empties into the Atlantic Ocean, the water is subsequently treated before being transported through a 67 kilometres (42 mi) underground canal to supply Rabat and Casablanca. Inaugurated August 2024, The system successfully averted a major drinking water crisis for the roughly 12 million residents of the Rabat-Salé-Kénitra and Casablanca-Settat regions that had faced shortages when local reservoirs neared depletion. by early March 2025, the project had already supplied over 700 million cubic meters of drinking water to these urban areas.

=== Pollution ===
For more than 15 years, residents have reported persistent air pollution characterized by fumes, foul odors, and a fine black soot known locally as "black dust". Environmental organizations, including Greenpeace, along with local civil society groups, have repeatedly raised concerns over the health impacts of this industrial and municipal pollution, highlighting rising rates of respiratory issues among local residents.

Investigations into the phenomenon point to two potential primary sources: the combustion of Heavy fuel oil by the National Office of Electricity and Drinking Water (ONEE) thermal power plant north of the city, and the continuous burning of solid waste at the Oulad Berjal landfill.

Solid waste disposal represents a major environmental issue for the municipality. The city's closest dumpsite, the Oulad Berjal landfill, is situated on the right bank of the Sebou River. Operating as an uncontrolled open site, the landfill is a primary driver of air and environmental pollution in Kenitra due to the frequent, widespread burning of trash. Environmental experts have warned that open burning releases harmful emissions and toxic smoke over surrounding neighborhoods, while its proximity to the Sebou River poses risks of leachate runoff and groundwater contamination.

== Notable people ==
Kenitra was the birthplace of:

- Amina Aït Hammou, Olympic athlete
- David Bitan, Israeli politician
- Ismaël Ferroukhi - director and scriptwriter
- Margie Cox, American R&B Singer
- Mohamed Sijelmassi, writer and physician
- Nayef Aguerd – footballer
- Saïd Aouita, Olympic athlete
- Sofian Chakla – footballer
- Tariq Chihab - former international footballer
- Youssef Chippo, International football player
- Soufiane El Mesrar, futsal player
- Hicham Dguig, futsal coach

== See also ==
- Mehdya
- Sidi Taibi
- Bouknadel
- Battle for Port Lyautey
- Maamora Forest
- Sebou River
