= Oued El Makhazine =

Oued El Makhazine واد المخازن
- Rural commune and town
- Location within Morocco
- Coordinates: 34°56′N 5°51′W
- Country: Morocco
- Region: Rabat-Salé-Kénitra
- Province: Kénitra

Population (2004)
  - Total: 8,384
- Time zone: UTC+0 (GMT)

Oued El Makhazine is a small town and rural commune in Kénitra Province of the Rabat-Salé-Kénitra region of Morocco. At the time of the 2004 census, the commune had a total population of 8384 people living in 1704 households.
