= Souk El Arbaa =

Souk El Arbaa سوق الاربعاء
- City
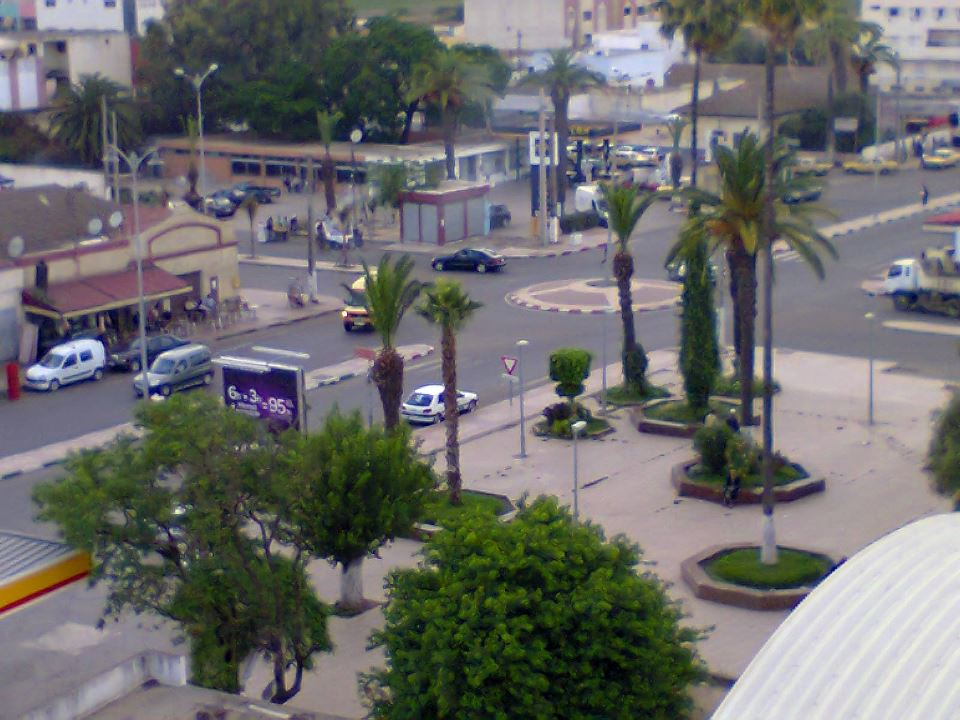
- Interactive map of Souk El Arbaa
- Coordinates: 34°40′48″N 05°58′48″W
- Country: Morocco
- Region: Rabat-Salé-Kénitra
- Province: Kénitra

Population (2024)
  - Total: 70,894
- Time zone: UTC+0 (GMT)

Souk El Arbaa (Arabic: سوق الاربعاء, romanized: Sūq al-Arbiʿāʾ, lit. 'Wednesday Market') is a town in Kénitra Province, Rabat-Salé-Kénitra, Morocco.

In the 2024 Moroccan census it recorded a population of 70,894, up from 69,265 in 2014, and 43,392 in 2004.

The ancient site of Iulia Valentia Banasa lies 13km south-west of the city.
