= Arbaoua =

- Town
- Location within Morocco
- Coordinates: 34°54′N 5°55′W
- Country: Morocco
- Region: Rabat-Salé-Kénitra
- Province: Kénitra Province

Population (2004)
  - Total: 2,333
- Time zone: UTC+0 (GMT)

Arbaoua is a town in Kénitra Province, Rabat-Salé-Kénitra, in north-western Morocco. According to the 2004 census, it has a population of 2,333.
