= Sidi Taibi =

Sidi Taibi سيدي طيبي Sīdī Ṭaybī
- Commune
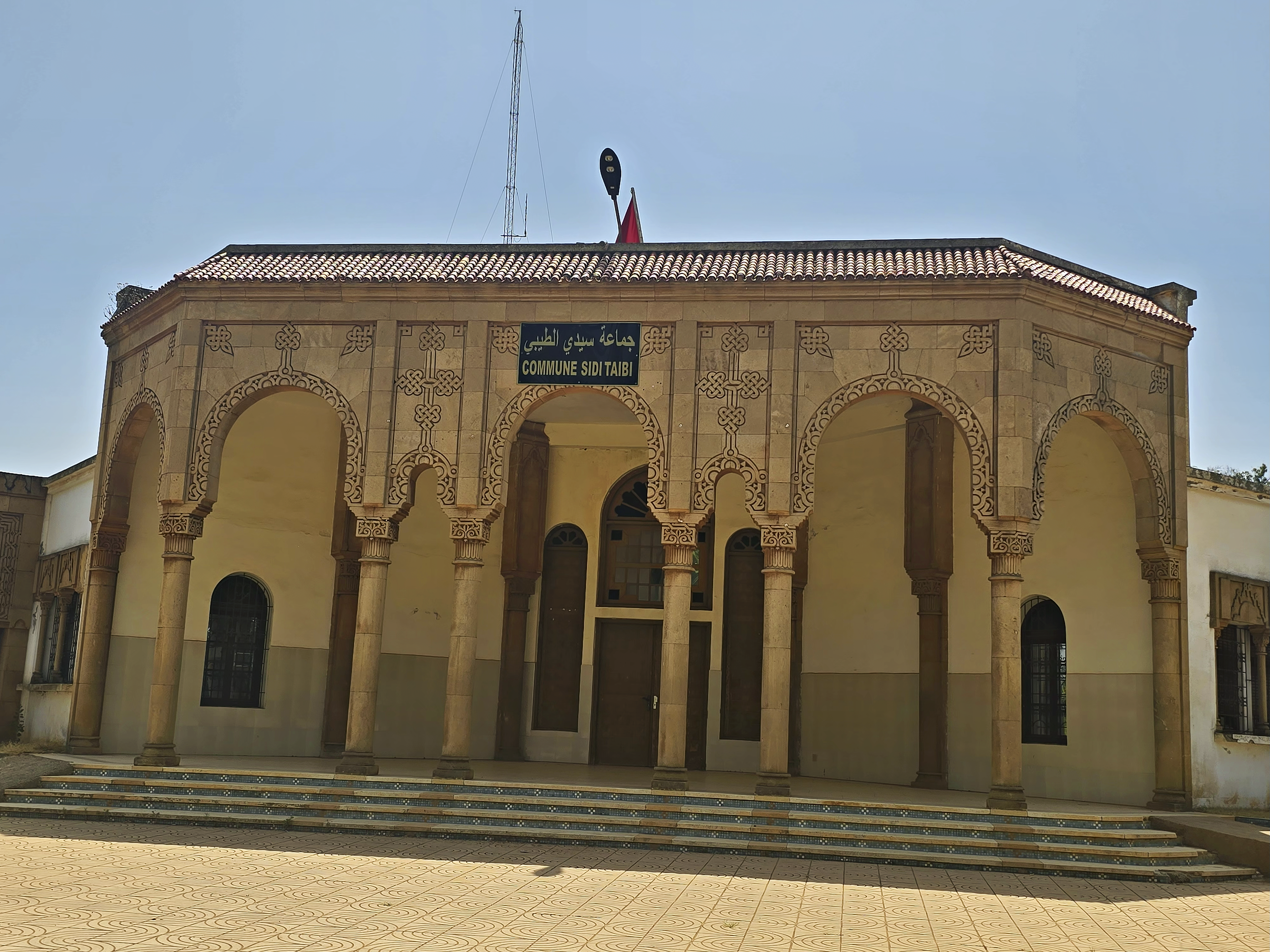
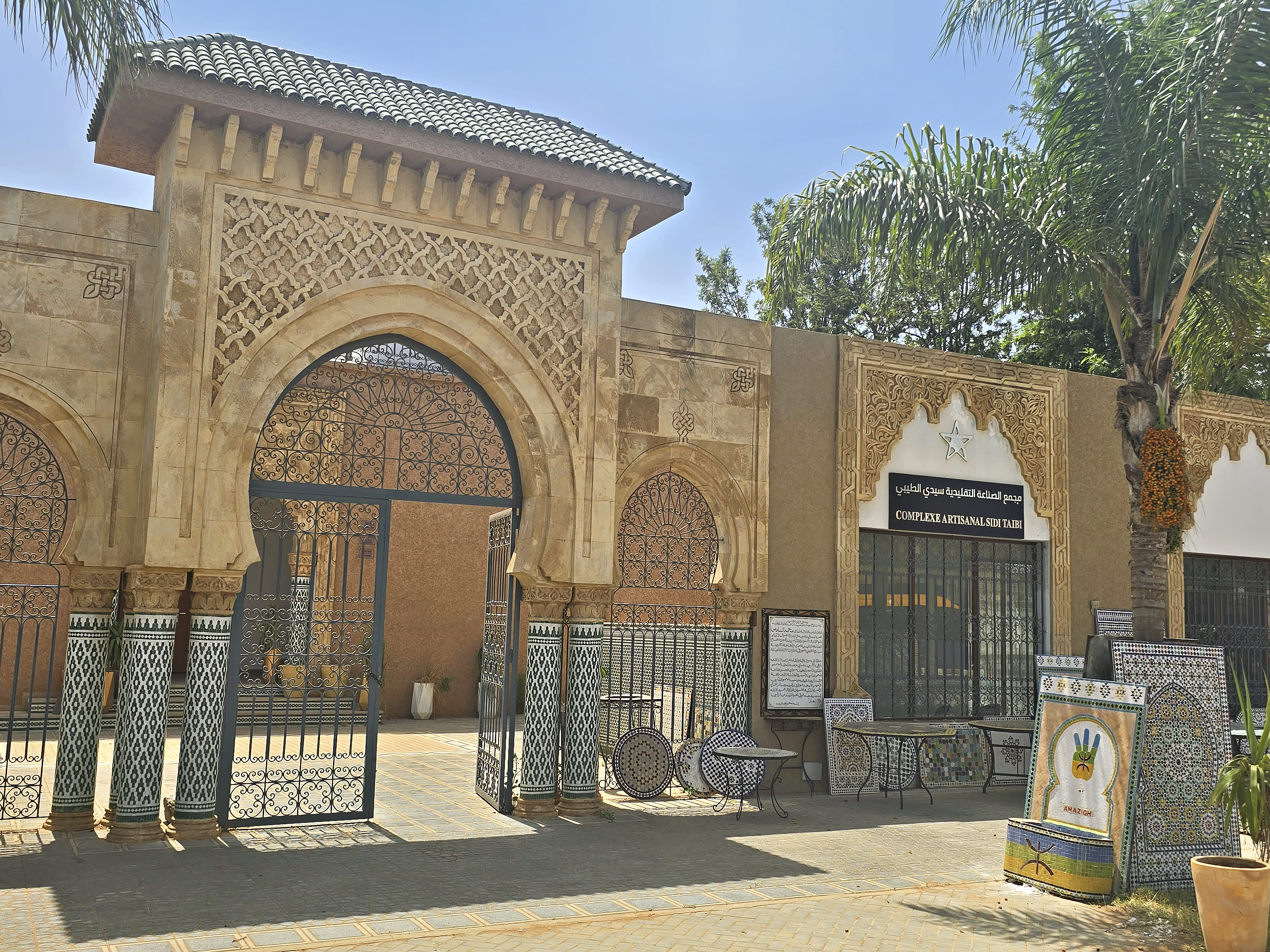
- Interactive map of Sidi Taibi
- Country: Morocco
- Region: Rabat-Salé-Kénitra
- Province: Kénitra

Population (2024)
  - Commune: 76,227
  - Urban: 67,255
- Time zone: UTC+0 (GMT)

Sidi Taibi (Arabic: سيدي طيبي) is a rural commune and town in Kénitra Province, Rabat-Salé-Kénitra, Morocco. As of the 2024 census the population of the commune was 76,227 with 67,255 in the city of Sidi Taibi.
