= Hamid Bénani =

Moroccan filmmaker

Hamid Bénani حميد بناني
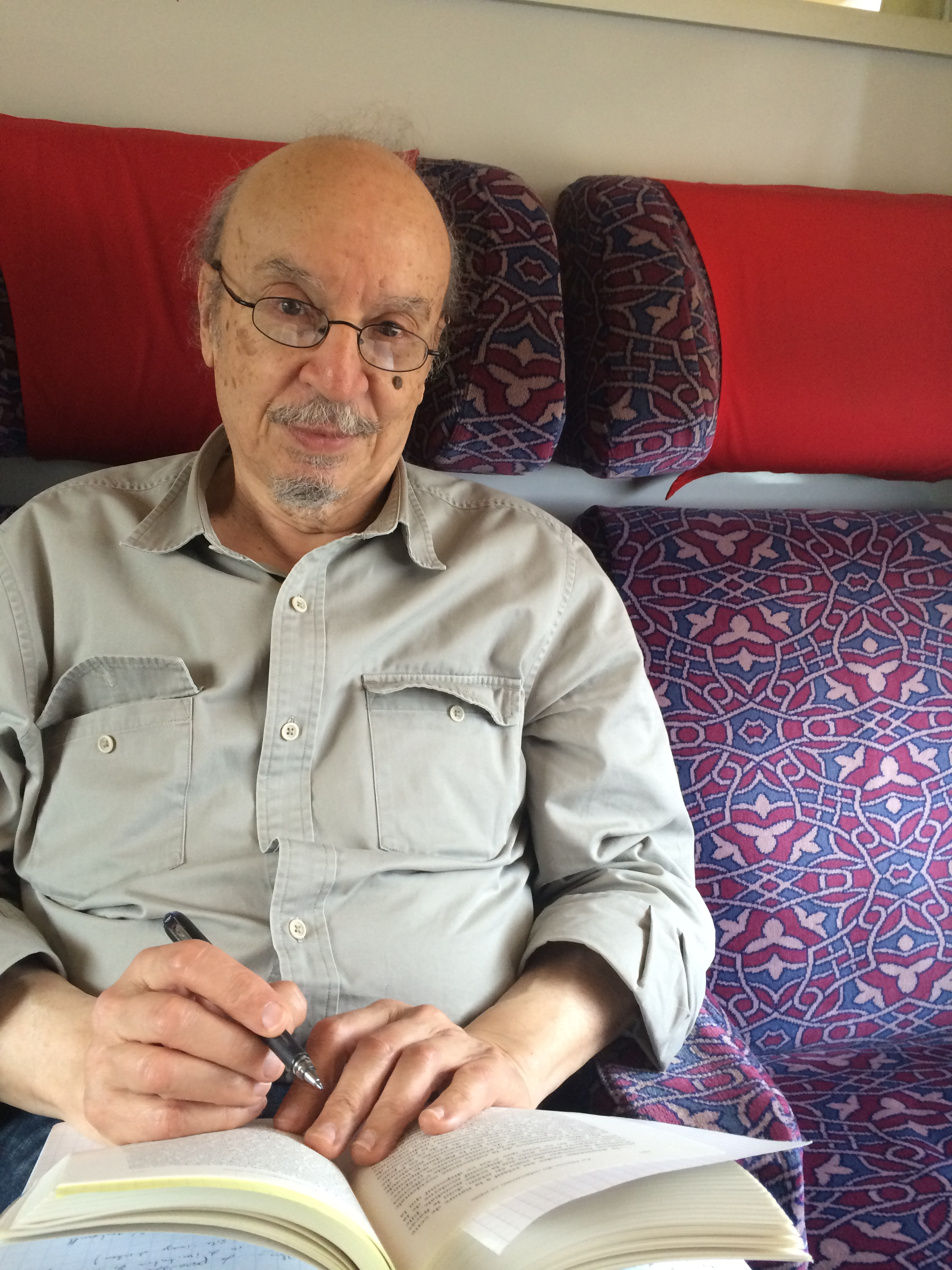
- Born: Hamid Bénani; 5 November 1940 (age 85); Meknes, Morocco
- Education: Institut des hautes études cinématographiques
- Occupations: Director; screen writer; cinematographer; author
- Years active: 1958–present

Hamid Bénani (Arabic: حميد بناني; born 5 November 1940), is a Moroccan film director, screenwriter and cinematographer. One of the most revered artists in Morocco, Bénani has made several critically acclaimed films including Wechma, La prière des absents and L'enfant Cheïkh. He is also a producer, writer and author.

== Personal life ==
He was born on 5 November 1940 in Meknes, Morocco. He had religious education at a Quranic school. Later, he completed secondary studies at Poeymirau and Moulay Ismaïl high schools.

== Career ==
In 1958, Bénani received an internship in drama and a creation and writing workshop organized by the Ministry of Youth and Sports. Then in 1964, he attended to the Faculty of Letters of Rabat to obtain the license in philosophy. In 1965, he started film studies at the Institut des hautes études cinématographiques (IDHEC) where he was awarded in 1967 under the section "Direction, production and management". Meanwhile, he attended drama seminars conducted at the Sorbonne and at the EPHE2 by philosophers Jacques Derrida, Roland Barthes and Paul Ricoeur.

In 1968, Bénani joined the Moroccan Broadcasting Television. Later he became the head of the external relations department. In 1969, he resigned from Société Nationale de Radiodiffusion et de Télévision (RTM). In 1970, he founded the production company called Sigma 3 in collaboration with Ahmed Bouanani, Mohamed Abderrahman Tazi and Mohamed Sekkat. In that year, the production company produced its first feature film Wechma. The film was screened at Moroccan Federation of film clubs (FMCC) and won several prizes and accolades at film festivals, where the film is unanimously considered as the founding film of Moroccan cinematography.

Even though the film received huge popularity among critics, Bénani had to wait almost twenty years to direct his second feature film, La prière des absents (The Prayer of the Absent), which was initially titled as 'The Secrets of the Milky Way'. This film is adapted from the famous novel by writer Tahar Ben Jelloun. In 2011, he directed the film L'enfant Cheïkh. The film premiered at the Tangier National Festival and received critical acclaim by the festival audience. And the film won the award for best picture.

Apart from direction, he published the novel entitled "Le dernier chant des insoumises" (The last song of the rebels) under the banner Editions du Sirocco. The book won Grand Atlas prize in 2019.

== Filmography ==
| Year | Film | Role | Genre | Ref. |
|---|---|---|---|---|
| 1967 | Les Bonnes | Director | film | |
| 1967 | Coeur à Coeur (Heart to Heart) | Director | film | |
| 1970 | Wechma (Traces) | Director | film | |
| 1993 | La prière des absents (The Prayer of the Absent) | Director | film | |
| 2012 | L'enfant Cheïkh (The Cheïkh Child) | Director | film | |
| 2017 | La Nuit ardente (Burning Night) | Director | film | |
