= Lake Ouiouane =

Lake in Khenifra, Morocco

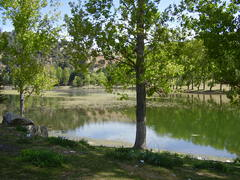
- Location: Khenifra, Morocco
- Coordinates: 5°20′24″N 48°7′33″E

Lake Ouiouane is situated in the Khenifra region of Morocco, a tourist destination located at the heart of the Middle Atlas mountains and cedar forests, which are the largest in Morocco. It is positioned 10 kilometers from the headwaters of Oum Er-Rbia River and 37 kilometers from the city of M'rirt.

Lake Ouiouane is home to a diverse array of fish species, including carp and trout.

Situated within the 1,600-meter-high Khenifra National Park, Lake Ouiouane is included on the Ramsar list of globally significant wetlands. However, the impact of the COVID-19 pandemic resulted in a notable decline in visitor numbers.

== See also ==
- Lake Dayet Iffer
- Lake Dayet Hachlaf
- Lake Dayet Ifrah
- Akalamm Abkhane
