= Lake Tiguelmamine =

Lac Tiguelmamine
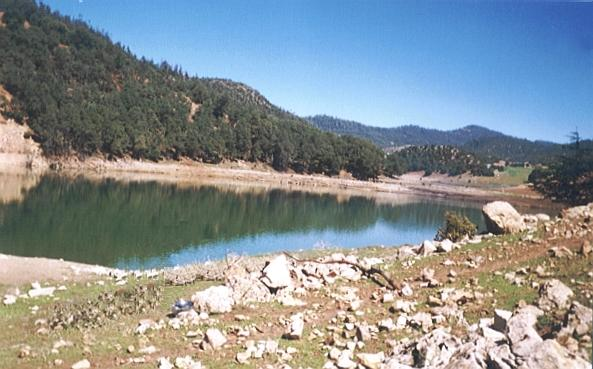
- Interactive map of Lac Tiguelmamine
- Location: Khenifra province, Morocco
- Coordinates: 32.9054°N 5.3428°W
- Type: Natural lake
- Surface elevation: 1,630 m (5,350 ft)

Tiglmamine or Tiguelmamine, diminutives of the Berber word "Aguelmame" which means lake, is situated 40 kilometres (25 mi) from Khénifra in the heart of the Moyen Atlas, in Morocco, at 1,630m altitude. The site is classed as a national heritage monument.

== Nomination ==
Lake Tiglmamine is also called the glasses of the Middle Atlas. This name was given to it because it contains two adjacent lakes connected in the form of glasses. Tiglmamine is an Amazigh name, which is the plural of the word Aglmam, meaning lake.
