= Lake Aguelmam Azegza =

Lake in Khénifra Province, Morocco

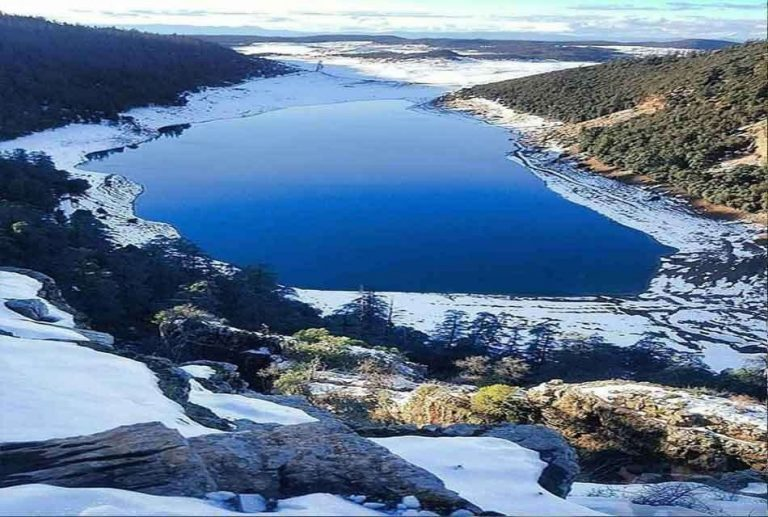
- View of the lake from above in winter
- Interactive map of Lake Aguelmam Azegza
- Coordinates: 32°58′33″N 5°27′0″W
- Country: Morocco
- Province: Khénifra Province
- Region: Béni Mellal-Khénifra
- Elevation: 1,500 m (4,900 ft)

Lake Aguelmam Azegza (in Central Atlas Tamazight: ⴰⴳⵍⵎⴰⵎ ⴰⵣⴳⵣⴰ) is a natural lake in Morocco covering an area of 40 hectares and reaching a depth of 25 metres (82 ft). It is situated in the village of Aguelmam Azegza at an altitude of 1,500 metres (4,900 ft) above sea level. The community takes its name from the lake, which is named after the Amazigh people and translates as the green lake. The lake is located in the Khénifra Province of the Béni Mellal-Khénifra region, approximately 30 kilometres (19 mi) from the city of Khénifra in the western Middle Atlas. The lake is renowned for its considerable influx of tourists during the summer months.

== Geography ==
Lake Aguelmam Azegza is situated within the Béni Mellal-Khénifra region of Morocco, within the western Middle Atlas mountain range. It is a natural lake, characterised by its verdant hue, surrounded by a dense forest of Atlantic cedar and green oak. The primary economic activity in the region is pastoralism, with tourism also playing a significant role. The lake is over 25 meters deep and covers an area of approximately 40 hectares. It is fed by water springs and is surrounded by steep chalky rocky cliffs. Although the lake is not a particularly popular destination for birds, it is home to a diverse array of fish and crustaceans. Additionally, it serves as a vital habitat for the Barbary macaque.

== Tourism ==
In 2020, the site of Lake Aguelmam Azegza was developed as a tourist attraction for the benefit of residents engaged in tourism activity on an area of 3 hectares. The development cost approximately 4.18 million dirhams, according to the standards of organic architecture, which included the cost of repairing the roads leading to the lake. This development included the preparation of roads and the construction of a group of shops in the form of Amazigh wooden tents. Lake Aguelmam Azegza plays host to the annual "Ice Swim Morocco" international competition, an international cold-water swimming event held during the winter season at Lake Aguelmam Azegza.

== Photo gallery ==
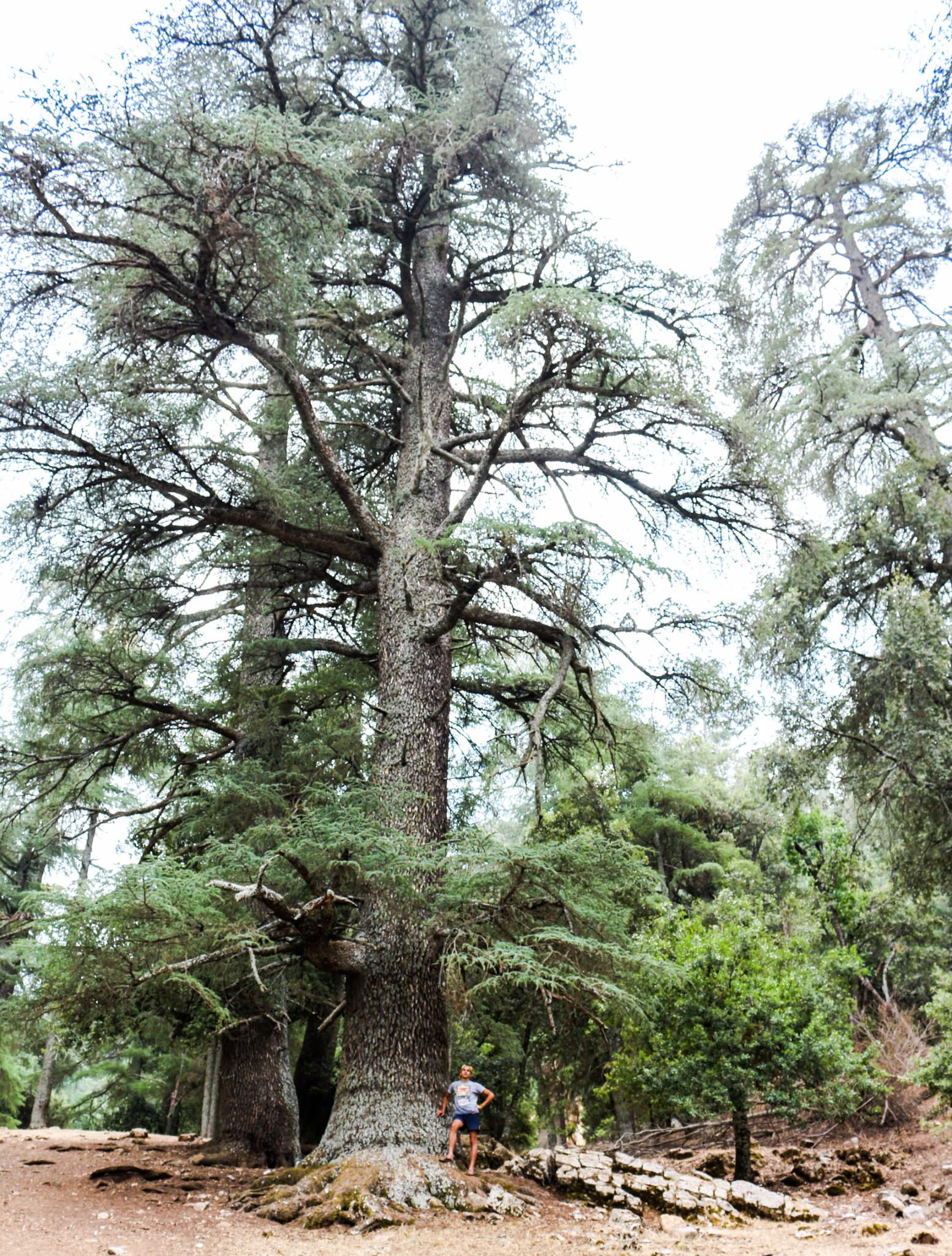

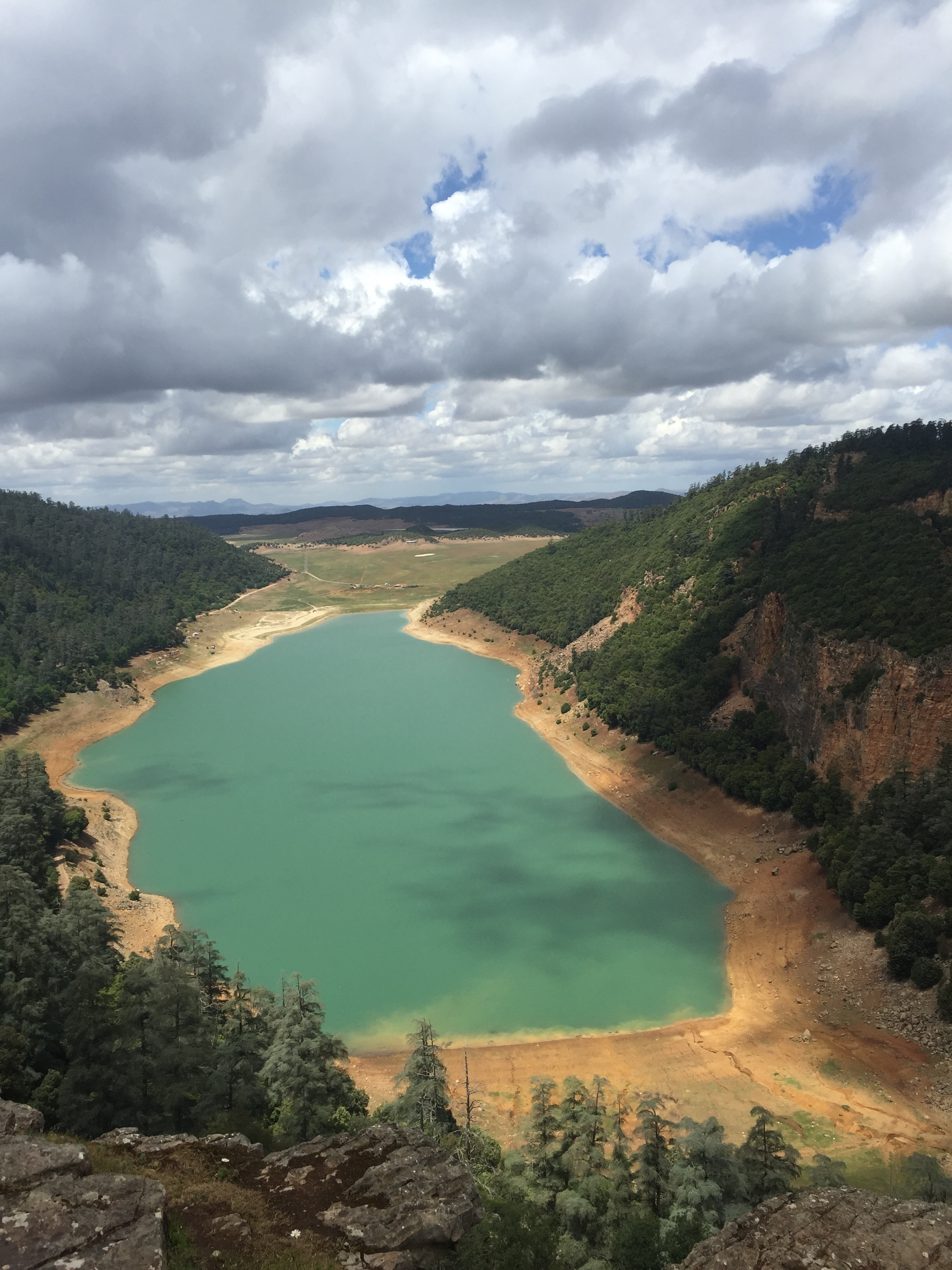

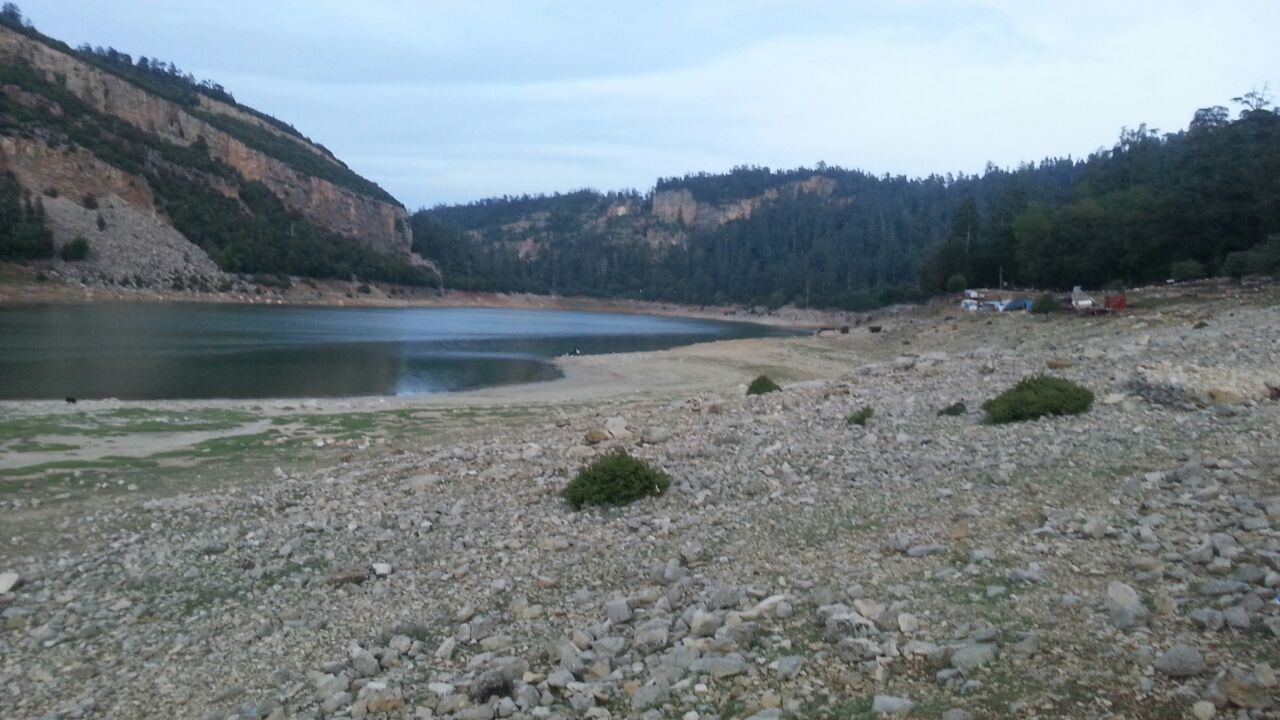

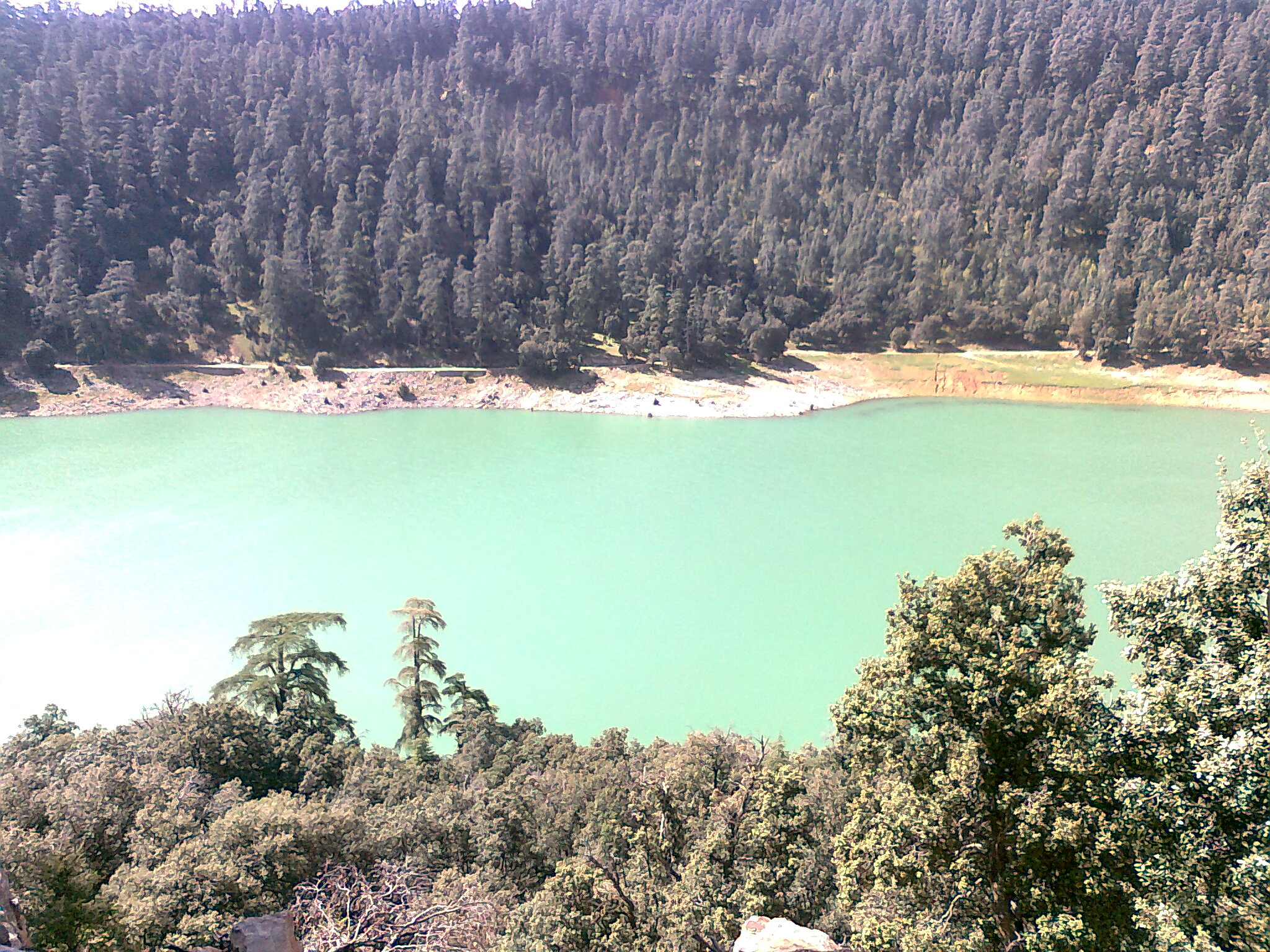

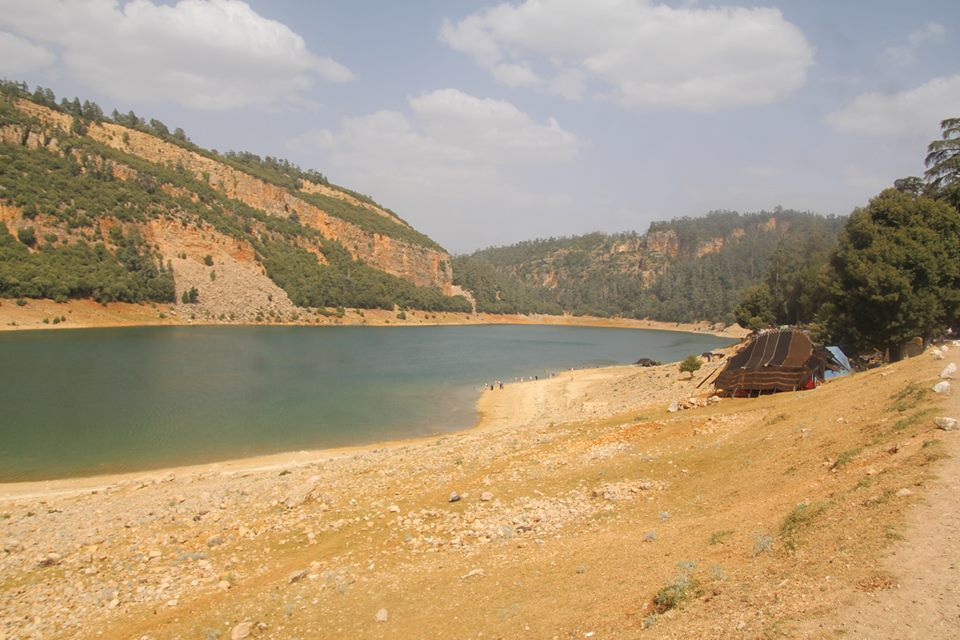

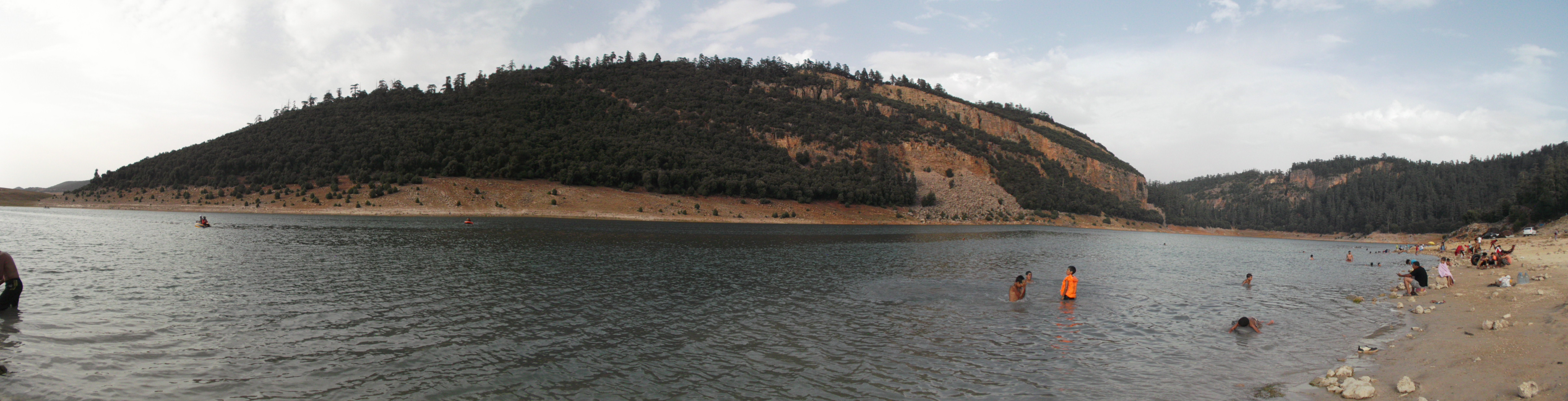

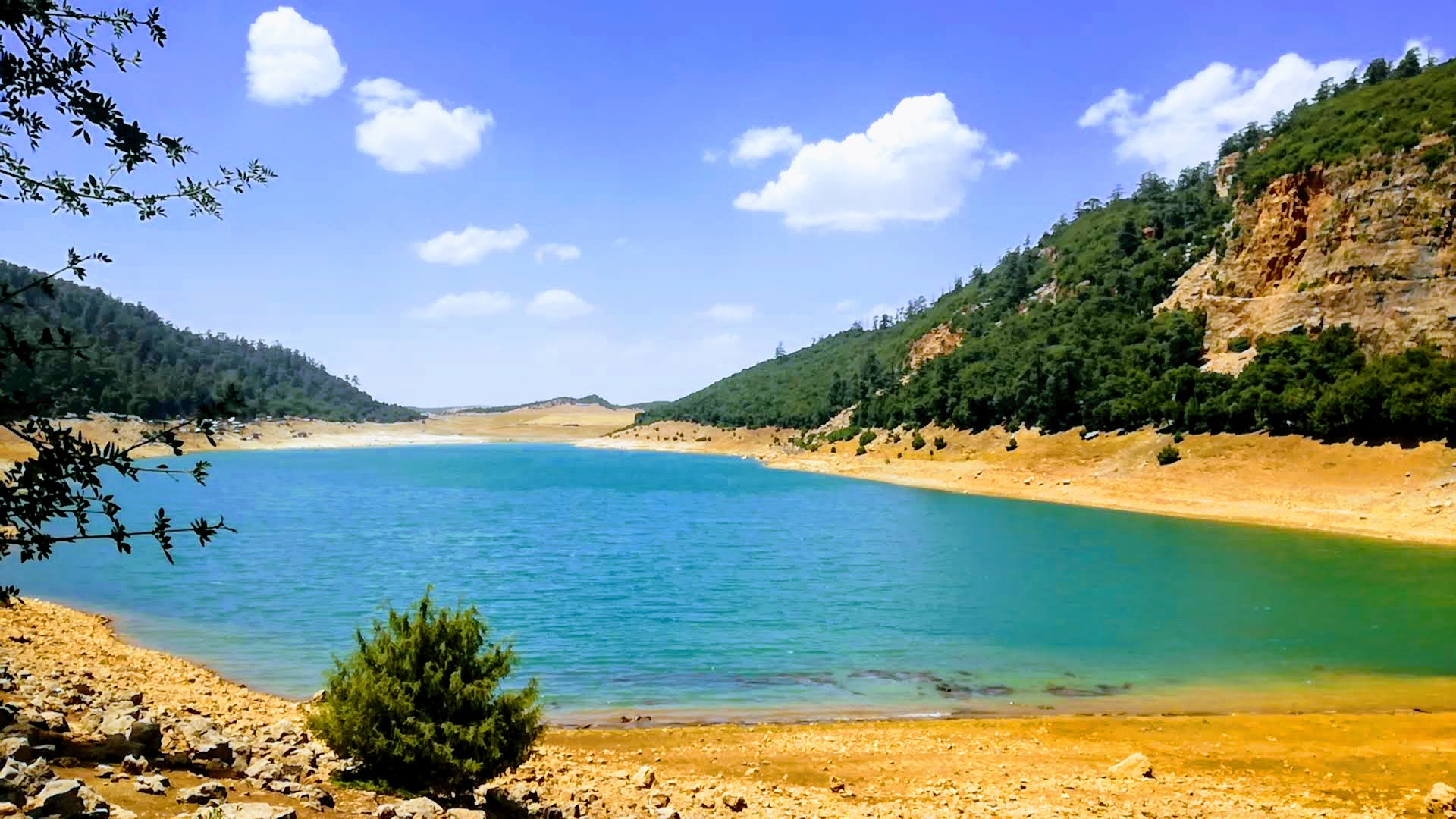

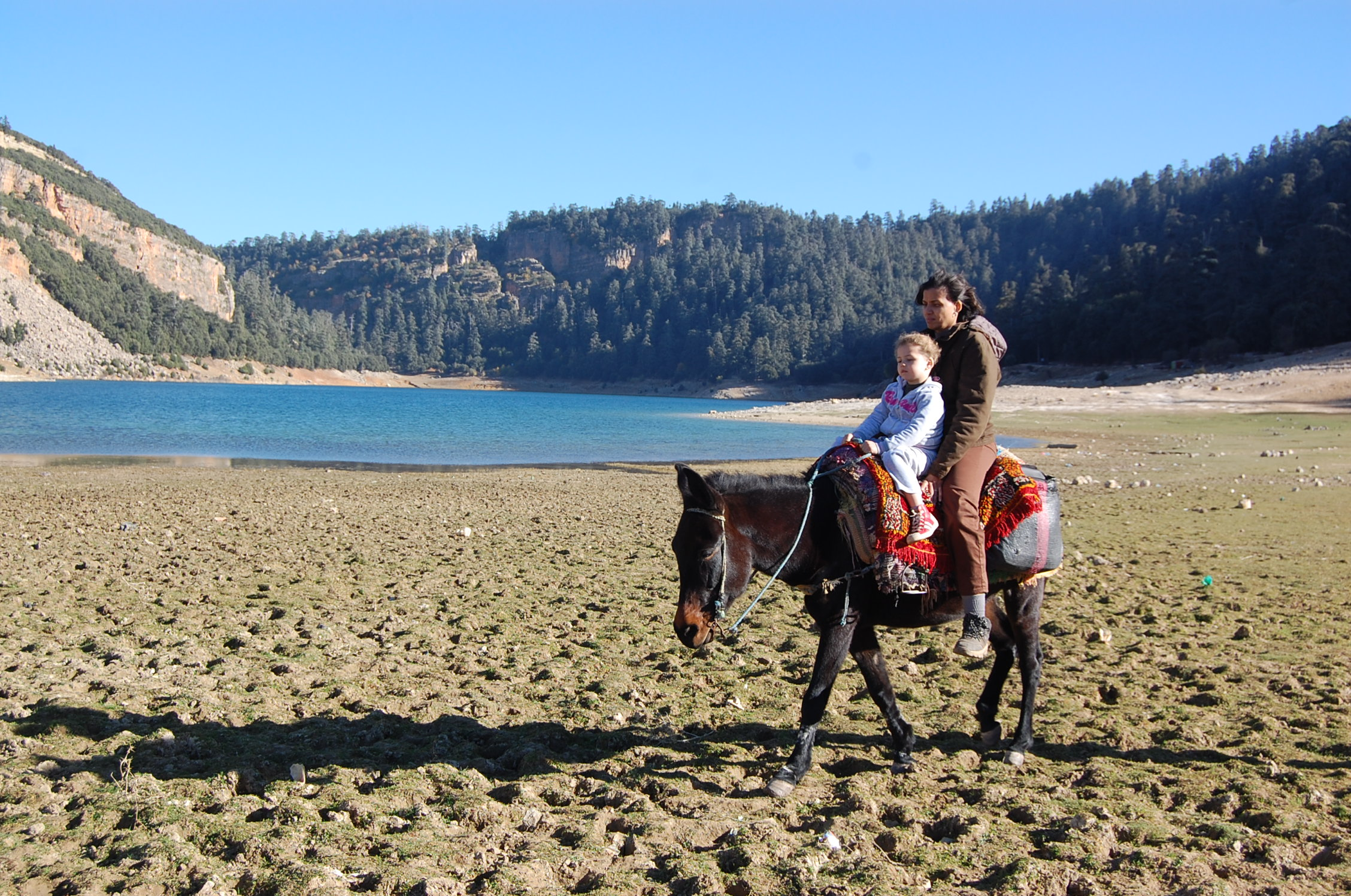

== See also ==
- Lake Dayet Iffer
- Akalamm Abkhane
