= Hasnae Taleb =

Moroccan-American financial executive

- Born: December 8, 1993 (age 32); Khenifra, Morocco
- Occupations: Financial executive, television presenter, and entrepreneur
- Known for: Television show Awwal Malyoun

Hasnae Taleb (born December 8, 1993) is a Moroccan-American financial executive, institutional investor and television presenter. She serves as the managing partner of Mintiply Capital, an investment banking and corporate finance advisory firm based in the United Arab Emirates, and is the GCC partner of Fuel Venture Capital, a venture capital firm based in the United States.

== Early life and education ==
Taleb was born in Khenifra, a city in the Middle Atlas region of Morocco. She relocated to the United States at the age of 17 and participated in an educational program at NASA's Marshall Space Flight Center in Huntsville, Alabama, during that year. She earned a Bachelor of Business Administration degree from the American University in 2014 and later obtained a Master of Business Administration from the University of Bolton in 2019.

Early in her career, Taleb worked at Morgan Stanley and Nasdaq in the United States. She later served as Chief Investment Officer at Ento Capital, an asset management firm regulated by the Dubai Financial Services Authority (DFSA) and based in Dubai's International Financial Centre (DIFC). During her tenure, the leadership team managed assets totaling over $4.2 billion.

== Career ==
Taleb started her career at Morgan Stanley in the United States, working in equity research and trading strategy. She subsequently joined Nasdaq, where her work focused on market microstructure and the behavior of institutional and algorithmic capital. In January 2023, Taleb hosted her first TV show, Awwal Malyoun, a weekly financial education program on AI Mashhad, a television channel based in Dubai.

In 2024, the Arabic-language media division of the U.S. Department of State recognized Taleb as a notable Arab woman in finance. Taleb is the managing partner of Mintiply Capital, an investment banking and corporate finance advisory firm based in the United Arab Emirates. The firm provides advisory services on mergers and acquisitions, private capital.

Taleb serves as the GCC partner of Fuel Venture Capital, a venture capital firm based in Miami with assets under management exceeding $600million. She is involved with Fuel's flagship funds and is a member of the investment committee for a 45million special purpose vehicle established between Mintiply Capital and Fuel Venture Capital for investment in the Gulf Cooperation Council (GCC) region. Taleb participated in the opening bell ceremony at the Abu Dhabi Securities Exchange (ADX) as part of a program recognizing women in capital markets in 2025. The exchange also awarded her its Silver Coin that year. In 2026, she was included in Forbes' list of 50 Most Influential Women in Africa.

== Media work ==
Taleb began hosting Awwal Malyoun (Arabic: أول مليون, meaning "First Million"), a weekly television program on Al Mashhad. The program focuses on financial literacy topics such as investment basics, stock marketing, and business valuation. Taleb has appeared as a market commentator on various media outlets, including CNBC Arabia, Bloomberg Asharq, Dubai TV, and Al Jazeera.

== Recognition ==
- In 2021, Taleb achieved the Lifetime Achievement Award from the UAE Ministry of Economy.
- In 2023, she was honored as the UAE's Most Inspiring and Empowering Women in Finance, UAE.
- In 2024, Taleb recognized by the Arabic-language media division of the U.S. Department of State.
- In 2024, She awarded Business Influencer of the Year from Filmfare Awards Middle East, UAE.
- In 2026, Hasnae Taleb was included in the Forbes Powerlist of 50 Most Influential Women in Africa.
