= Lake Dayet Iffer =

Lake in Ifrane, Morocco

Lake Iffer
- ضاية إيفر (Moroccan Arabic)
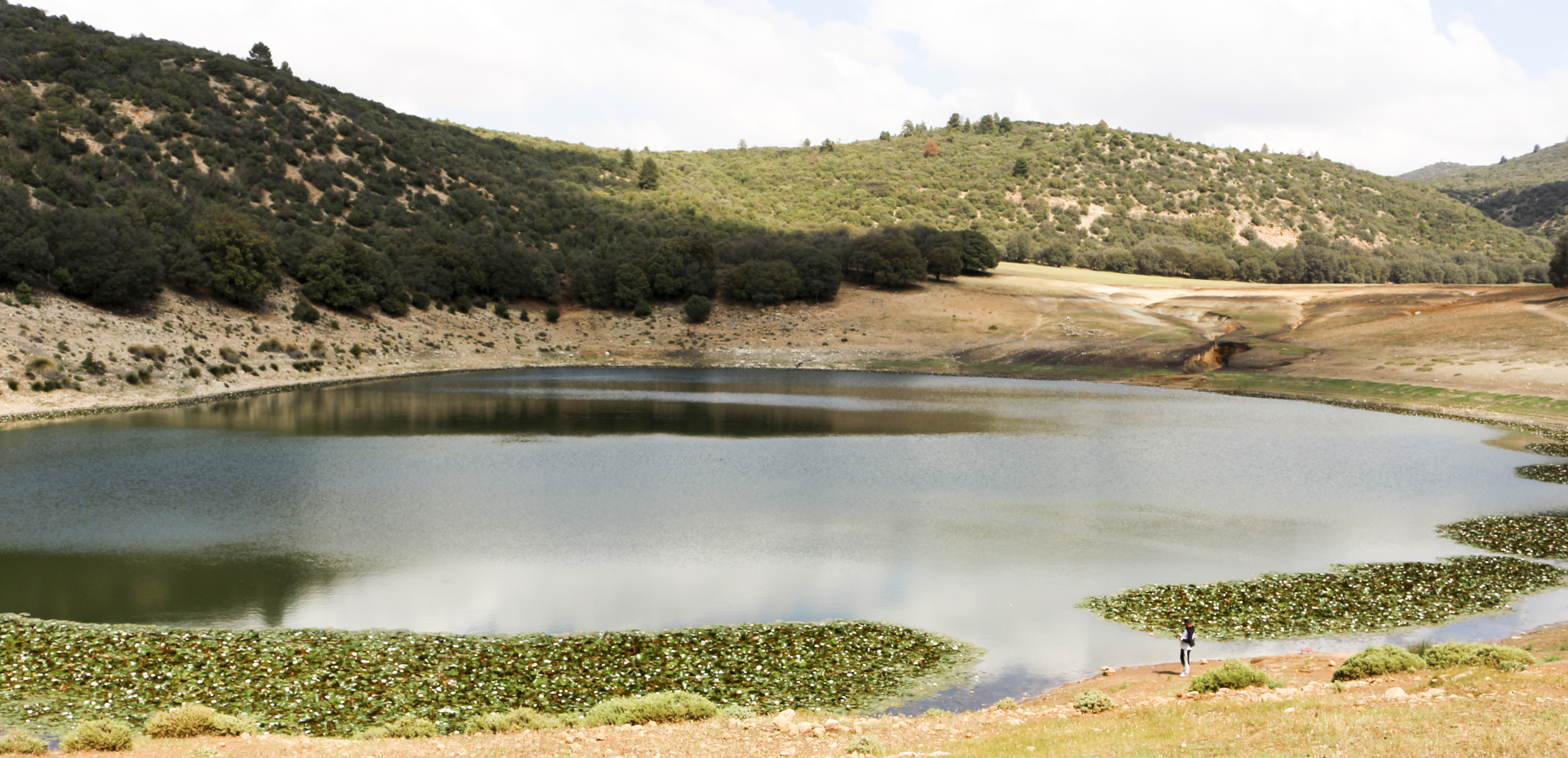
- Interactive map of Lake Iffer
- Location: Ifrane Province
- Coordinates: 33°36′30″N 4°54′30″E
- Type: Lake
- Basin countries: Morocco
- Surface area: 3.5 km^{2} (1.4 sq mi)
- Average depth: 6 m (20 ft)
- Surface elevation: 1,520 m (4,990 ft)

Lake Iffer (Arabic: Dayet Iffer) is a Moroccan natural lake located in the community of Dayat Aoua in Ifrane Province. It is situated along the Middle Atlas tourist lakes route, 35 km (22 mi) from Ifrane and 22 km (14 mi) from Imouzzer Kandar.

== Etymology ==
The name "Iffer" comes from a Berber language word meaning hidden due to the lake's hidden location between the mountains.

== Description ==
The lake is semi-circular in shape, with a diameter of 300 meters, situated at an altitude of 1520 meters and with a depth of 6 meters. With an area of 3.5 hectares it is the smallest natural lake in the Middle Atlas, and is characterized by a sub-humid climate. Located within the Takeltont Forest Reserve, Lake Iffer is surrounded by diverse vegetation consisting mainly of evergreen oak, Aleppo pine and juniper. The lake is home to many waterfowl and has been designated a wetland by the World Wide Fund for Nature (WWF). Several fish species including crucian carp inhabit the lake, while water lilies flourish in its waters.

== Photo gallery ==
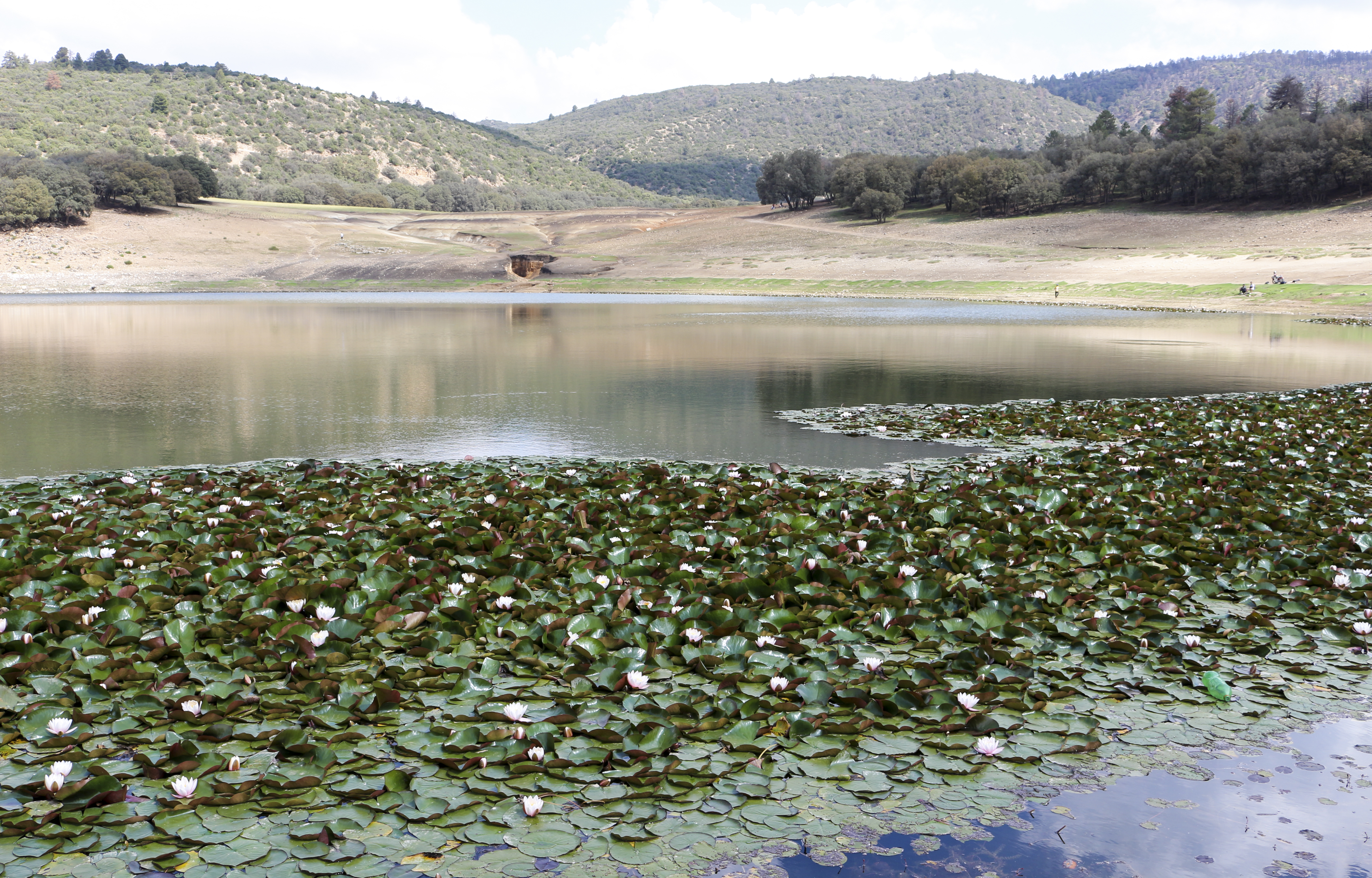

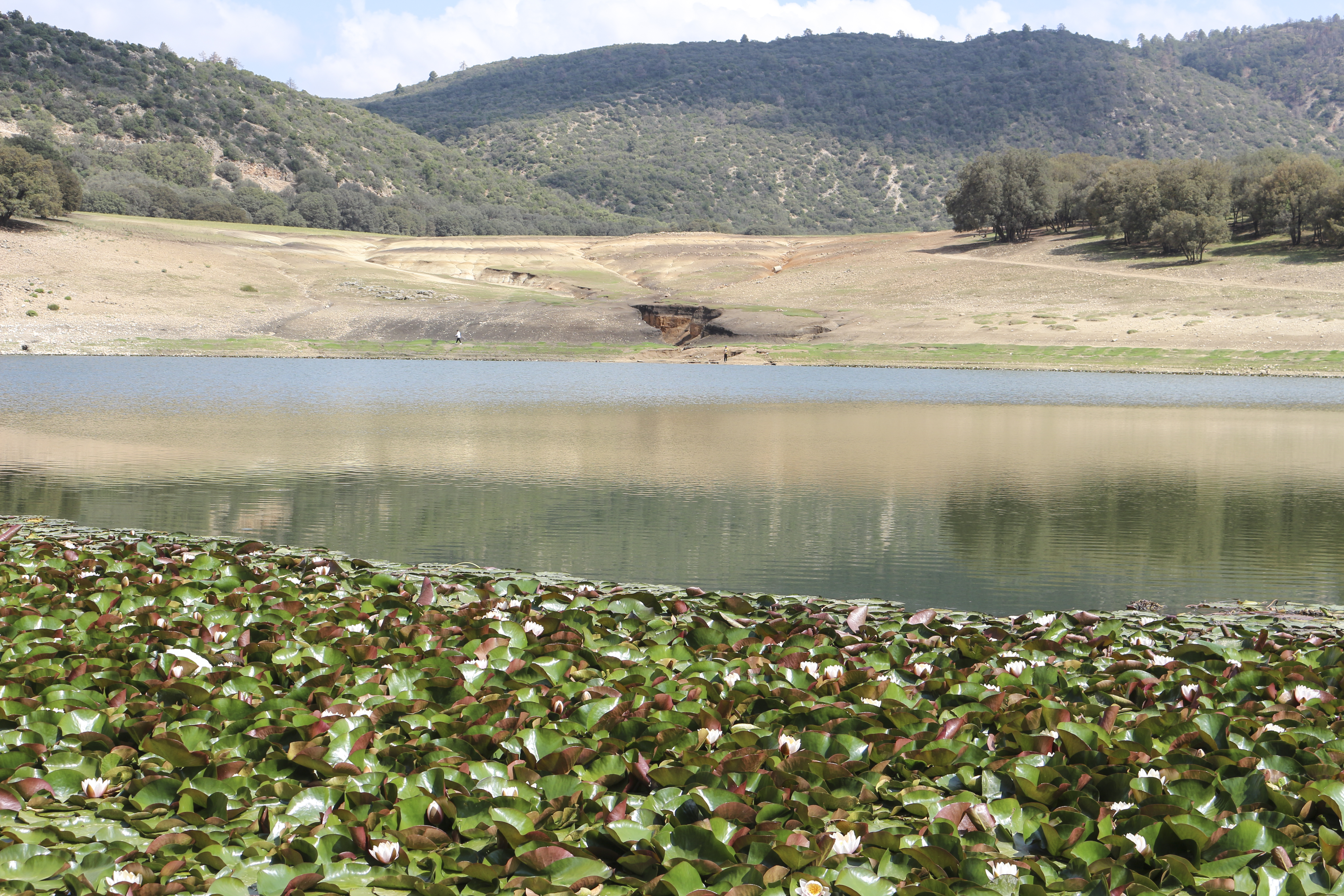

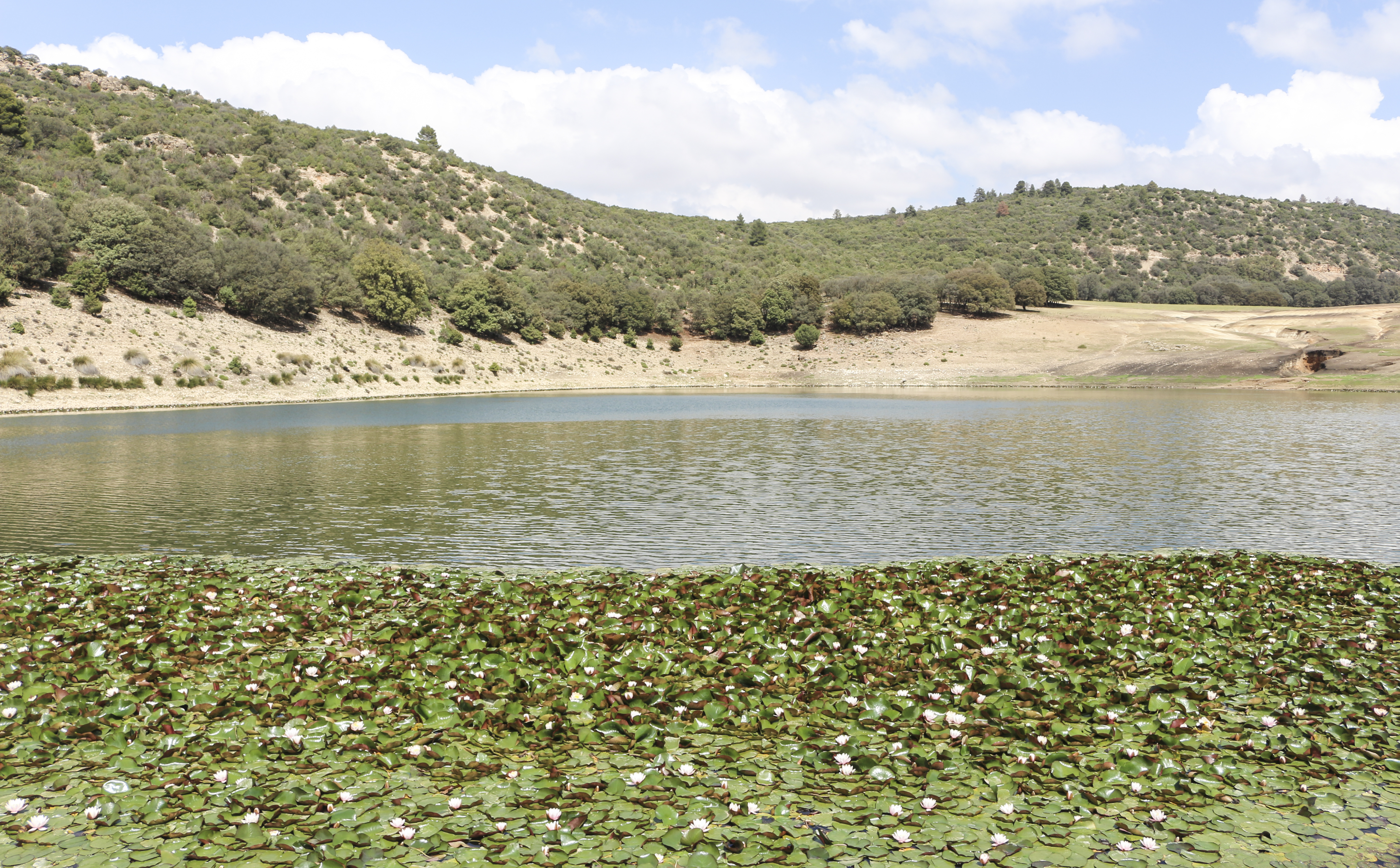

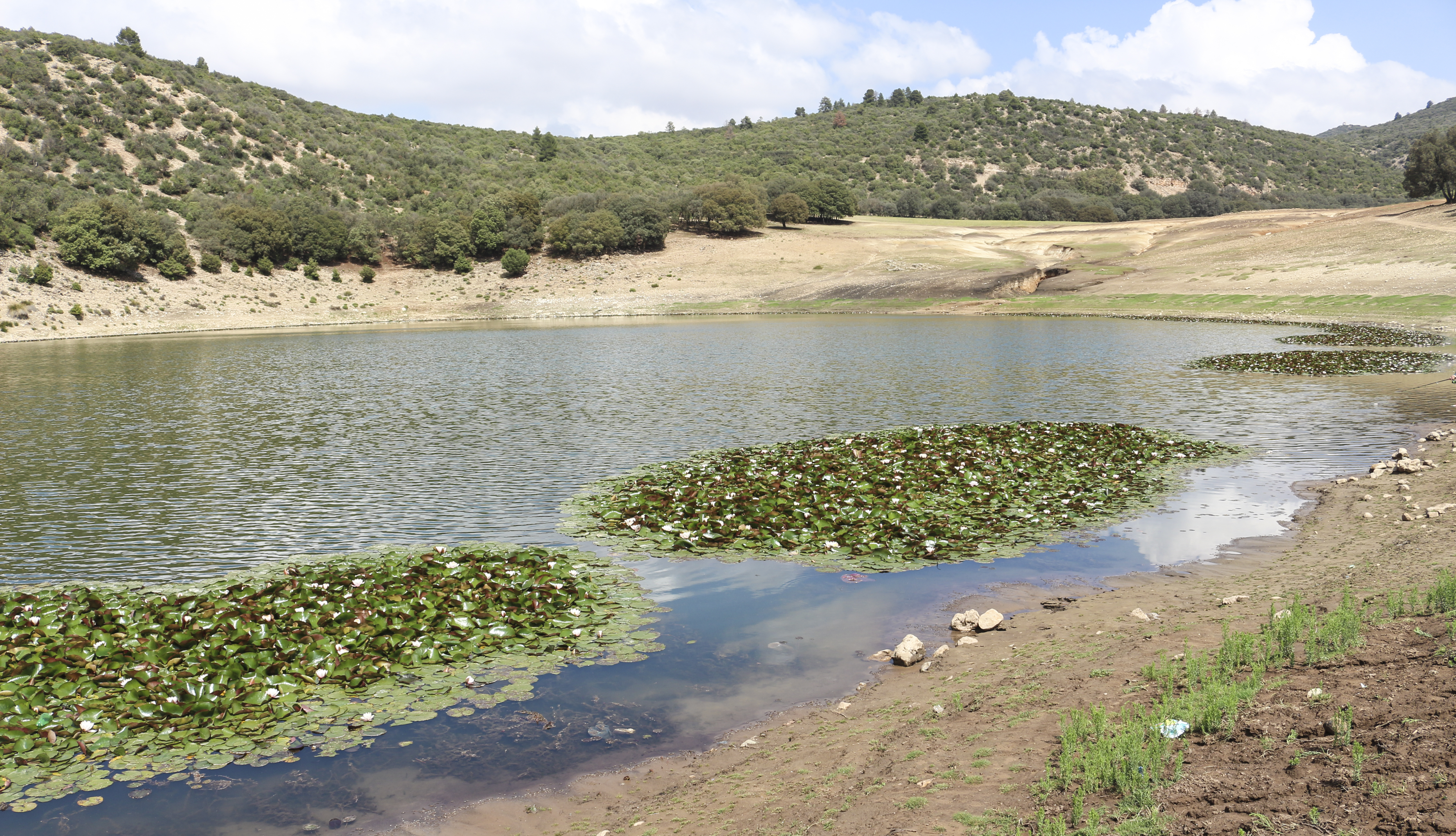

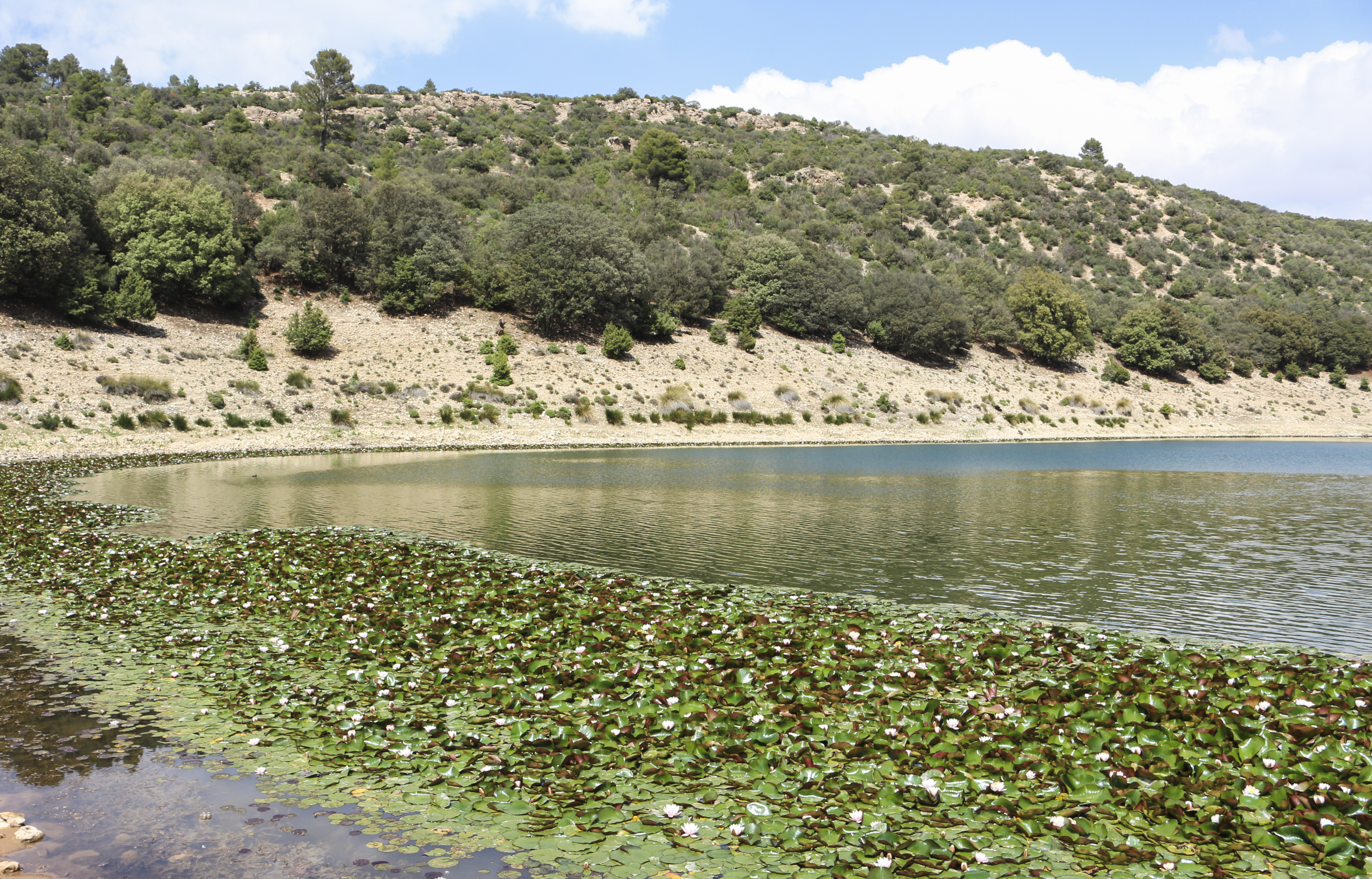

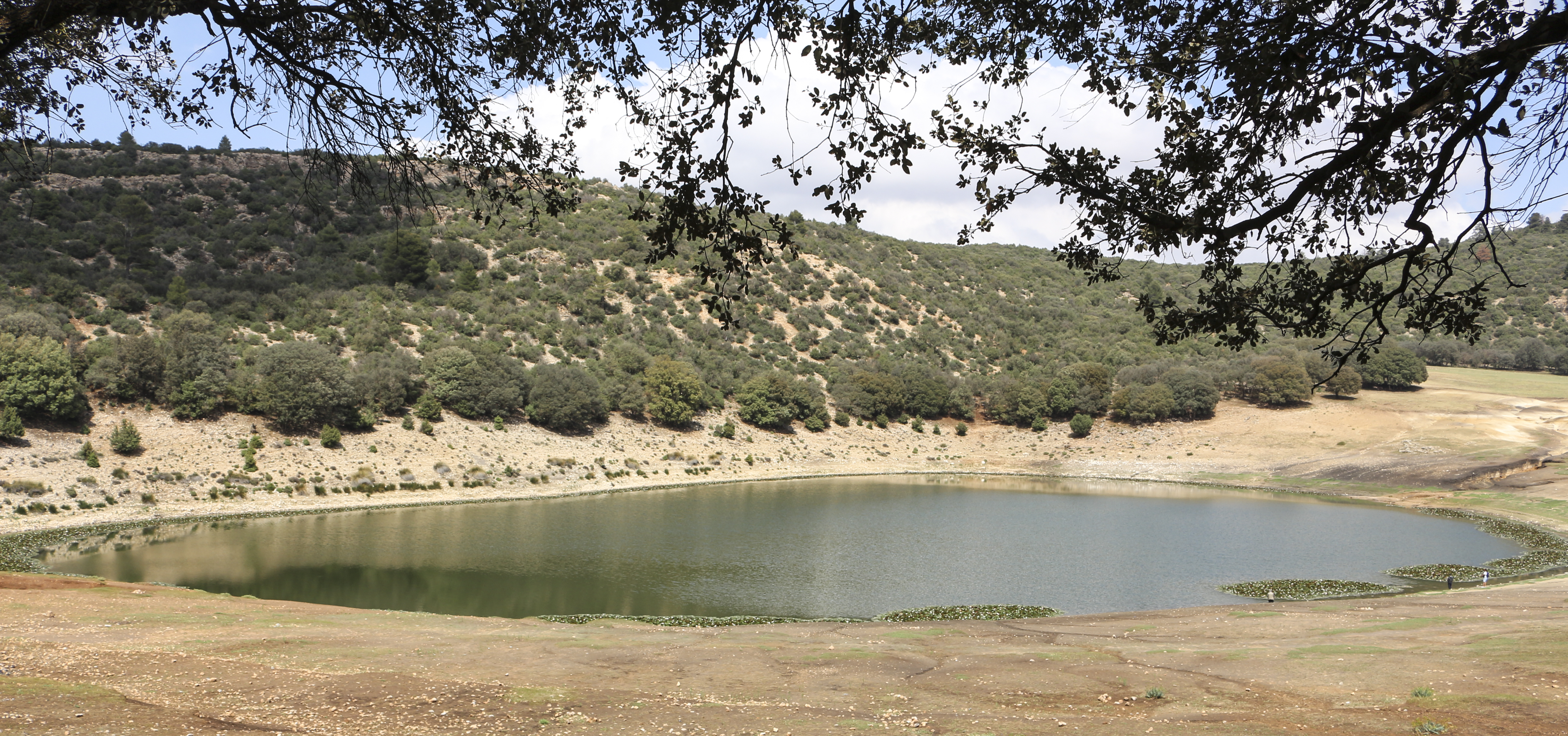

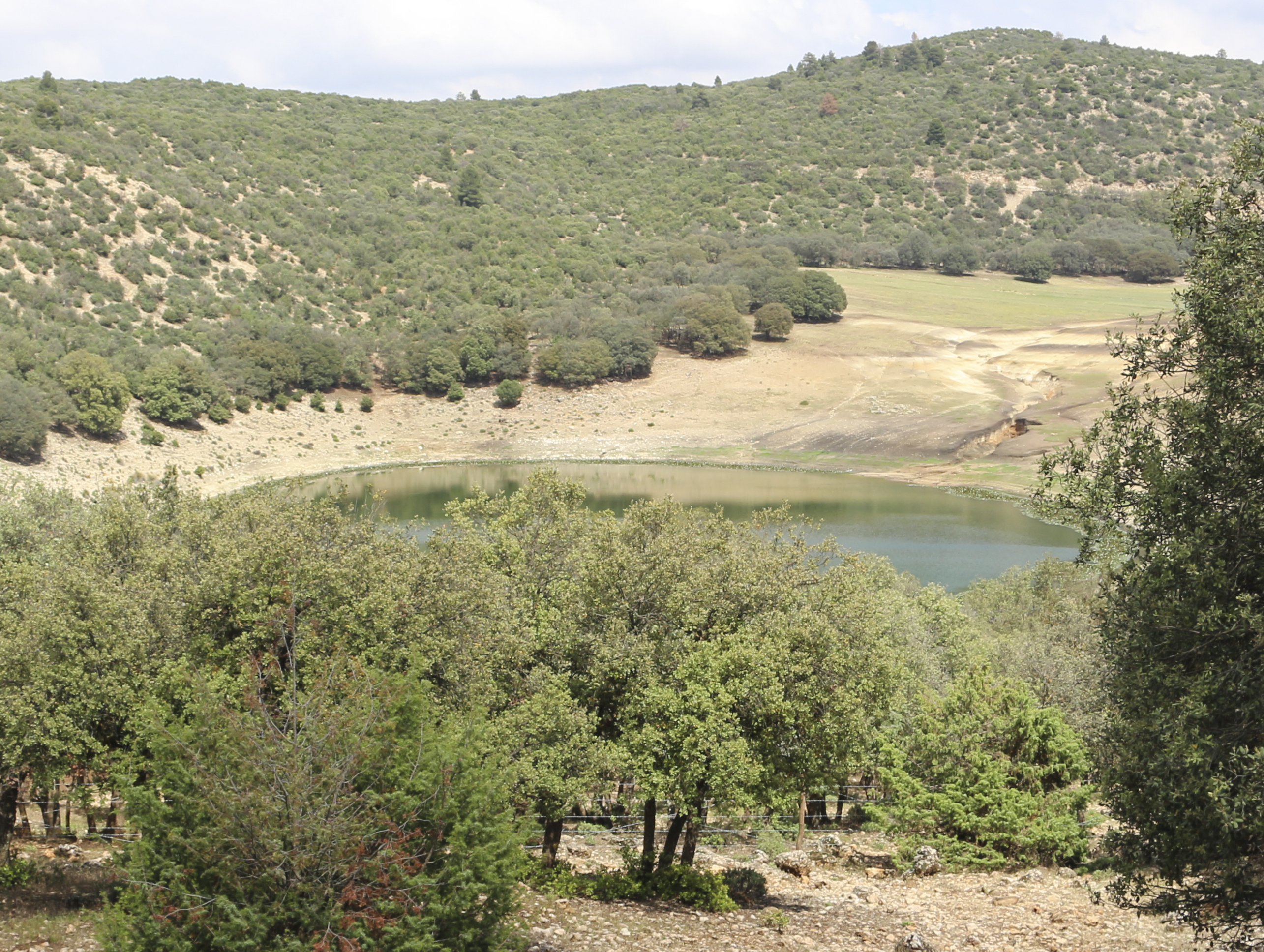

== See also ==
- Lake Dayet Hachlaf
- Lake Dayet Ifrah
- Akalamm Abkhane
