= Ifrah =

Ifrah may refer to:

== First name ==
- Ifrah Ahmed, Somali-Irish social activist
- Ifrah Wali (born 1995), Pakistani alpine skier

== Surname ==
- Georges Ifrah (1947-2019), French author
- Oz Ifrah (born 1982), Israeli footballer
- René Ifrah, American actor

== Places ==
- Lake Dayet Ifrah, a lake in Ifrane Province, Morocco
