= Jbel Bou Naceur =

Mountain in Morocco

Mount Bou Nasser Jbel Bou Naceur جبل بوناصر
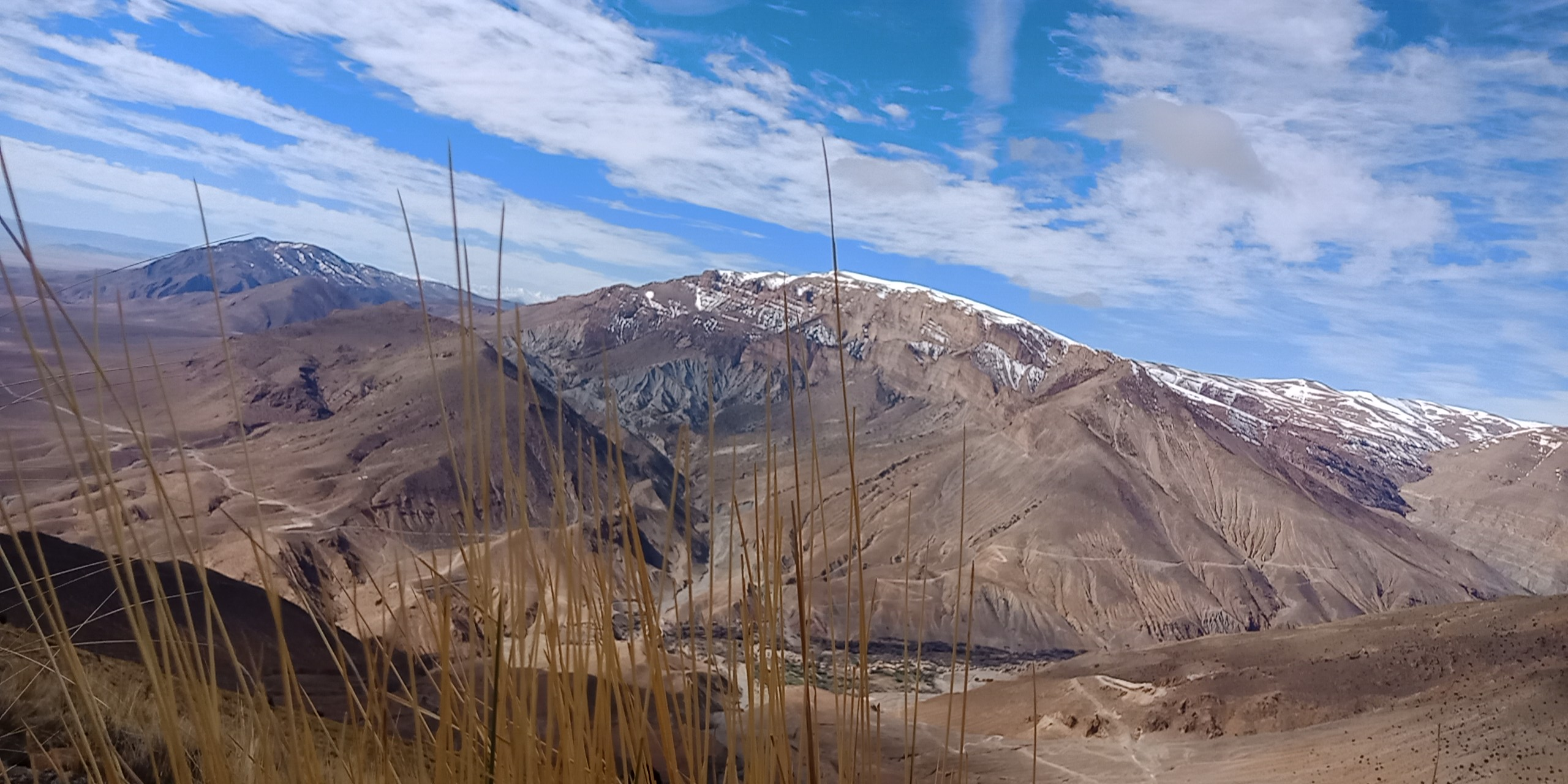
- Jbel Bou Naceur in 2018

Highest point
- Elevation: 3,340 m (10,960 ft)
- Prominence: 1,642 m (5,387 ft)
- Listing: Ultra; Ribu
- Coordinates: 33°33′59″N 3°53′29″W

Geography
- Location: Sefrou Province, Fès-Meknès, Morocco
- Parent range: Middle Atlas

Climbing
- First ascent: Unknown
- Easiest route: From Tirnest or Tinesmet Taounate Province

Mount Bou Nasser or Jbel Bou Naceur is a mountain in Sefrou Province, Fès-Meknès, Morocco. Its altitude is 3,340 meters.

== Geography ==
It is the highest peak in the Middle Atlas, located near Tirnest to the south and Tinesmet to the north. A high peak covered by cedar forests, the Bou Nasser summit is one of the favourite destinations for hikers in the region of the Atlas Mountains.

== See also ==
- Middle Atlas
