= Jbel Bou Iblane =

Mountain in Taza, Morocco

Mount Bou Iblan Jbel Bou Iblane جبل بويبلان
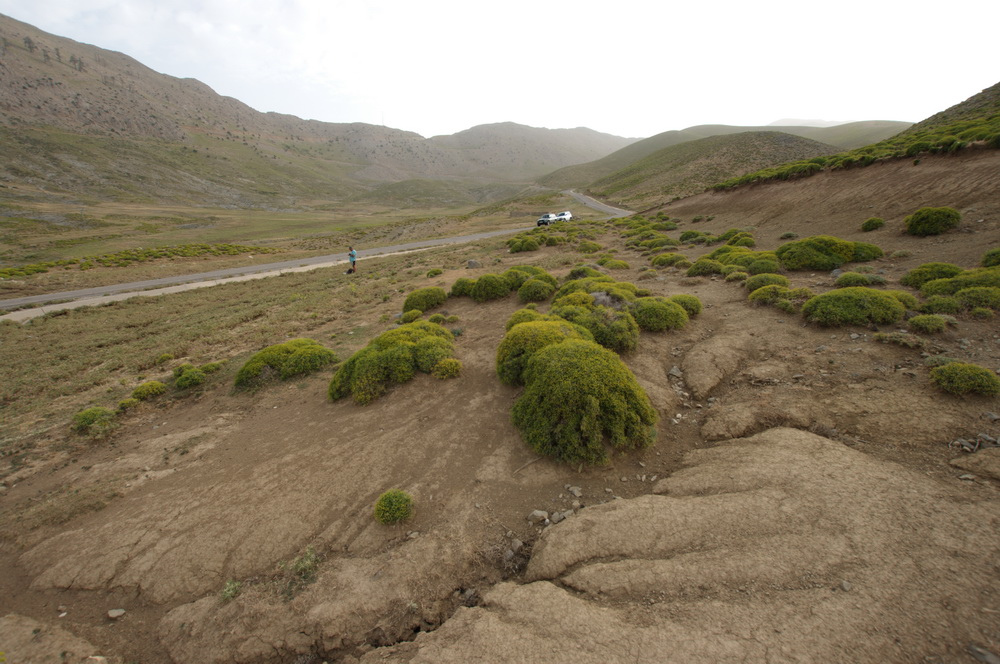
- Vegetation on the slopes of Mount Bou Iblan

Highest point
- Elevation: 3,081 m (10,108 ft)
- Coordinates: 33°39′49.72″N 4°5′25.84″W

Geography
- Location: border between Taza Province and Guercif Province
- Parent range: Middle Atlas

Climbing
- First ascent: Unknown
- Easiest route: From Refuge de Taffert Taounate Province

Mount Bou Iblan or Jbel Bou Iblane is a mountain of Taza the Fès-Meknès region of Morocco. Its altitude is 3,081 metres (10,108 ft)

== Geography ==
It is located in the Middle Atlas, Taza. There was a heavy snowstorm in the area of the mountain in 2009. This summit is one of the favourite destinations for hikers in the Atlas Mountains region.

== See also ==
- Middle Atlas
