= Jbel Hebri =

Mountain in Morocco

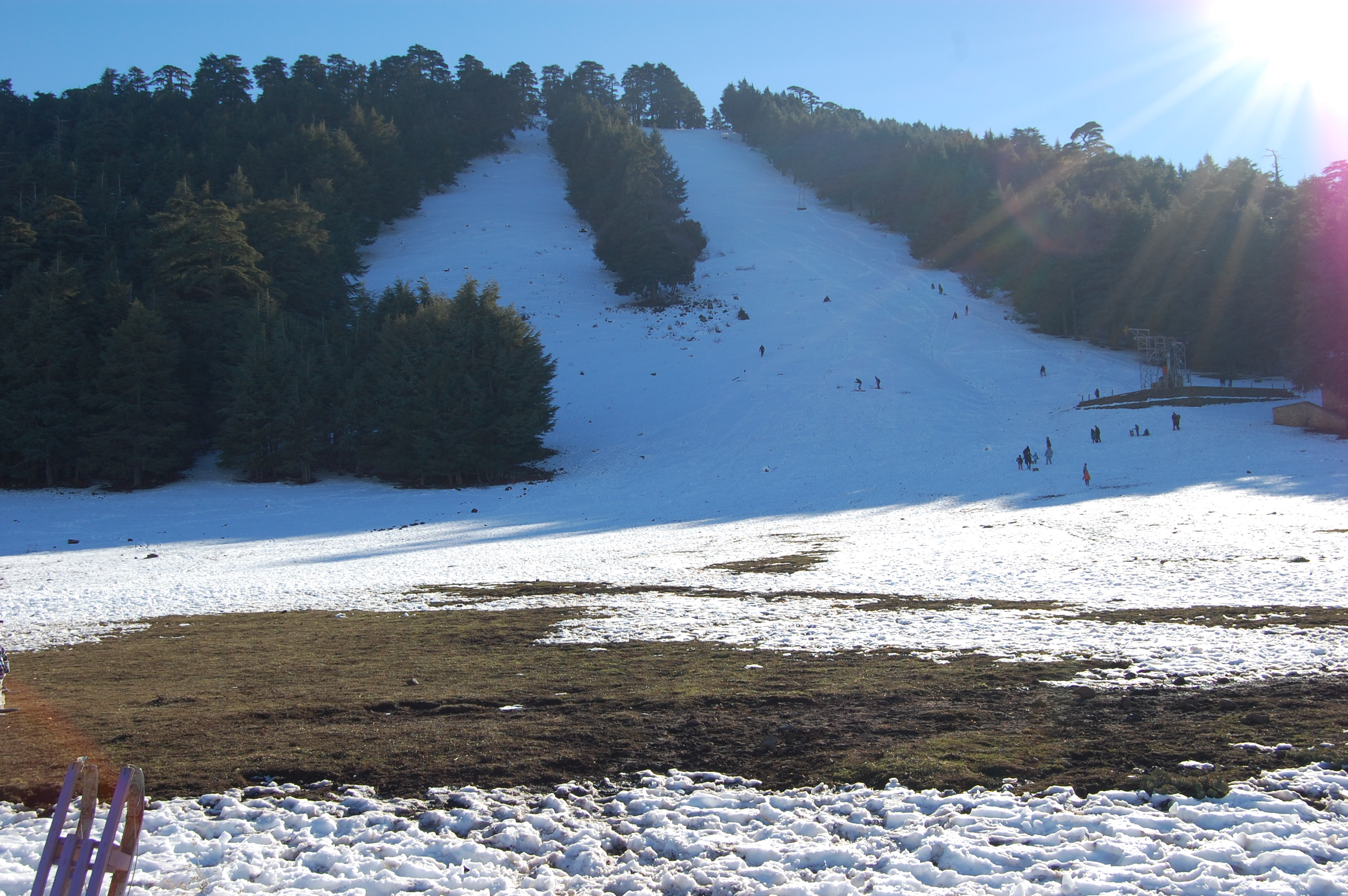
- View of Jbel Hebri during winter

Highest point
- Elevation: 2,092 m (6,864 ft)
- Coordinates: 33°21′40″N 5°08′32″W

Geography
- Location within Morocco
- Location: Fès-Meknès, Morocco
- Parent range: Atlas Mountains

Geology
- Rock age: Pleistocene
- Mountain type: Volcanic cone

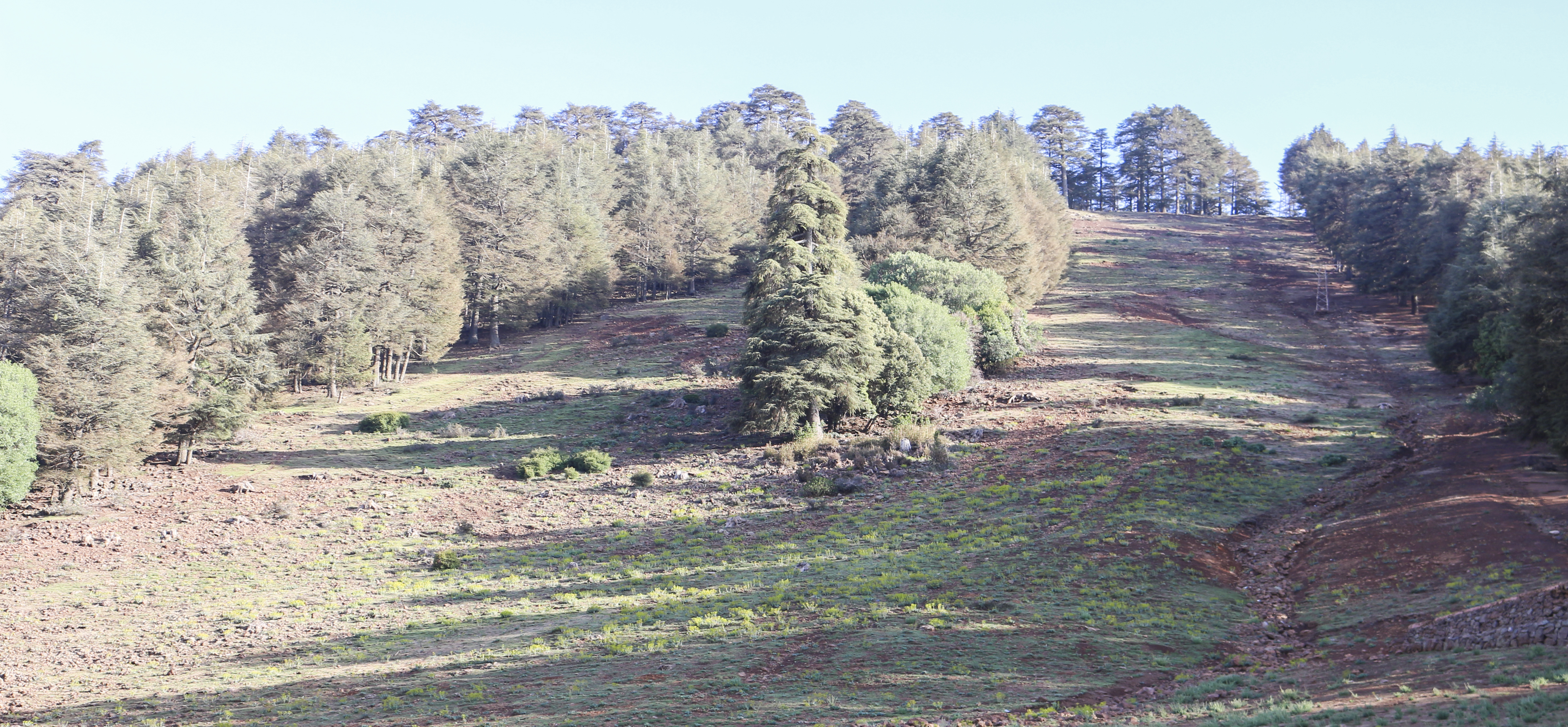
Hebri ski resort during the summer

Jbel Hebri is a volcanic cone peaking at 2092m of altitude in the Middle Atlas, in Morocco, south east of the city of Azrou. The mount is most known by the Moroccans for its snow tracks where skiing and sledding is possible during winter.
