= Mohamed Rouicha =

Moroccan Amazigh Singer / Folk

Mohamed Rouicha ⵎⵓⵃⴰⵎⵎⴷ ⵔⵡⵉⵛⴰ
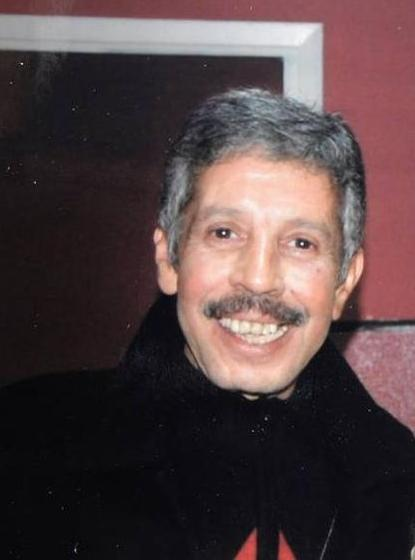
- Rouicha on one of his album covers

Background information
- Born: 1950; Khenifra, Morocco
- Died: 17 January 2012 (aged 61–62) Khenifra, Morocco
- Genre: Tamazight (Berber of the Atlas)
- Occupations: Singer-songwriter, musician
- Instruments: Lwtar Ouatar, sintir, or guimbri

Mohamed Rouicha (Arabic: محمد رويشة; 1950 – 17 January 2012) was a Moroccan folk singer. His songs often contain themes such as love and life in Morocco. His most famous songs are Ya lehbiba, bini w'binek darou lehdouden and Inas inas.

== Life and career ==
He was a famous Amazigh artist, poet, singer, composer and musician. “Rouicha” was a nickname which meant “mix something for us” in Tamazight, which was the phrase his friends used to ask him to come up with and perform a new piece of music on the spot. He mastered the “loutar” instrument (see photo).

Rouicha travelled and performed his music worldwide. He left the “Dior Chioukhs” school in his native Khenifra in central Morocco at the age of 11, and began playing loutar in 1964, especially in traditional bands. The same year, Rouicha started interpreting traditional Tamazight songs and produced his first record in collaboration with the Moroccan channel RTV1. To have accomplished this at that time, when there was only one TV station, was an enormous milestone on the path towards an unprecedented success.

Rouicha sang in a warm manner, and gradually gained fame in Morocco and North Africa, even among Moroccans who do not speak or understand Tamazight. His music was played on public transport and in public places. He became well-known thanks to titles such as Ya lehbiba, bini w’binek darou lehdoud (My beloved, they've set us apart) in Tamazight and Arabic. Rouicha would sing the same song in both languages with separate titles, the same words poetically translated using eloquent language and very touching poetry. His unique and artistic way of playing the loutar earned him nicknames such as “the Spiritual Father of the Loutar” and “the Greatest master of the Loutar” and he was also the one who added the fourth string to the loutar in order to play higher notes. The themes of Rouicha's texts evoke, in a traditional popular style, love, nature, justice, politics, life and death.

In 2004, he performed with his fellow musicians in the Roman ruins of Volubilis as part of the Fez Festival of World Sacred Music. In July 2010, he was invited to sing to inaugurate the Tinghir Gorges Festival in the town of Tinghir (in the Moroccan Draa-Tafilalt region). This event was very dear to his heart since his mother came from this community. Before starting to perform at this event, he mentioned his parents and sent them his love by saying: “Mimiss n’moulay Lahcen, mimiss n’lala Aicha iliss n’moulay Hanafi oult tdoght”, literally: “Son of Moulay Lahcen, son of Lala Aicha daughter of Moulay Hanafi who comes from Tugdha”.

== Death ==
After a career of almost 50 years, Rouicha died on January 17, 2012, because of health problems.
