= Middle Atlas =

Mountain range in Morocco

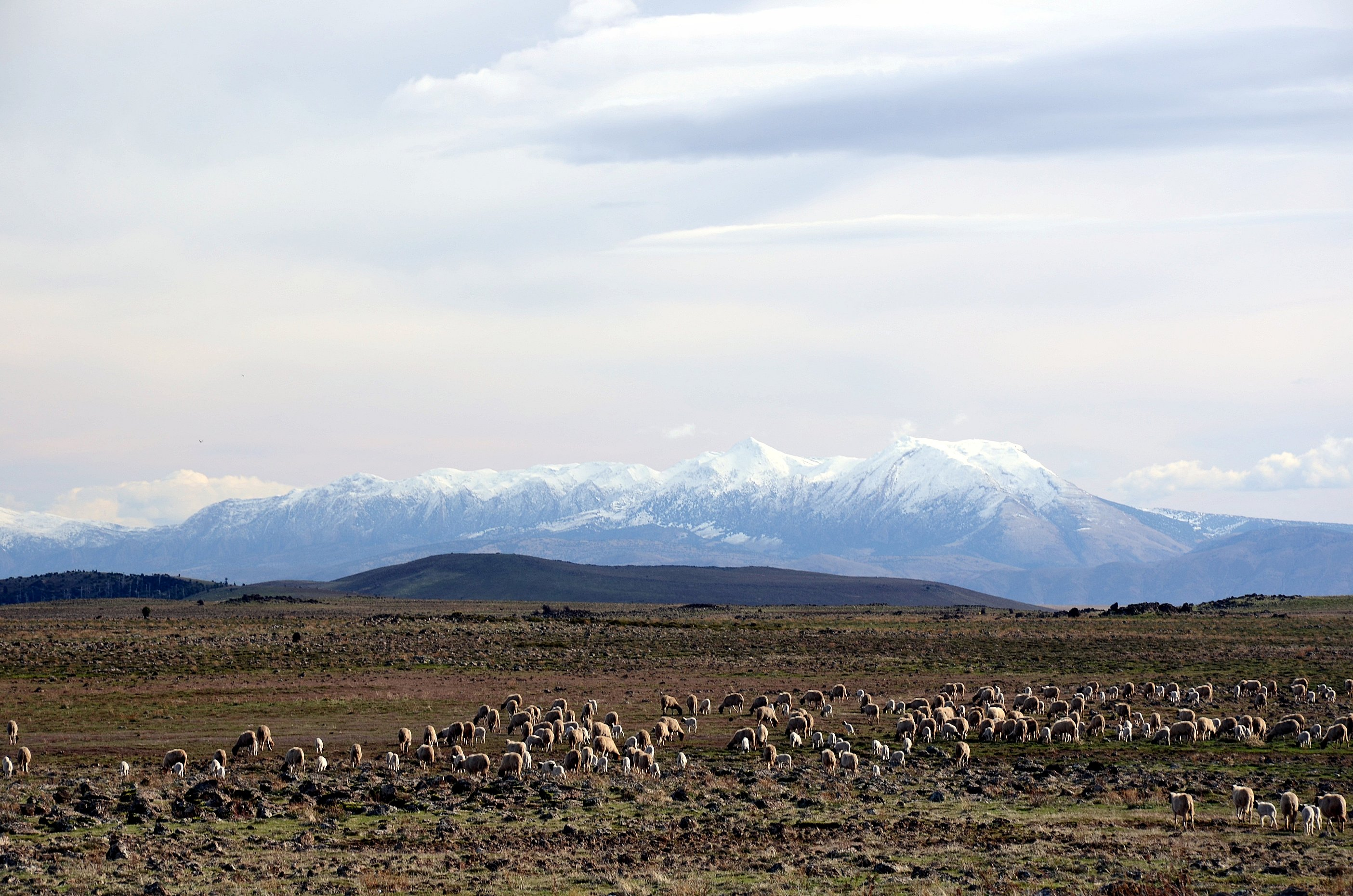

Highest point
- Peak: Jbel Bou Naceur
- Elevation: 3,340 m (10,960 ft)
- Coordinates: 33°34′01″N 3°53′25″W

Naming
- Native name: ⴰⵟⵍⴰⵚ ⴰⵏⴰⵎⵎⴰⵙ (Central Atlas Tamazight)

Geography
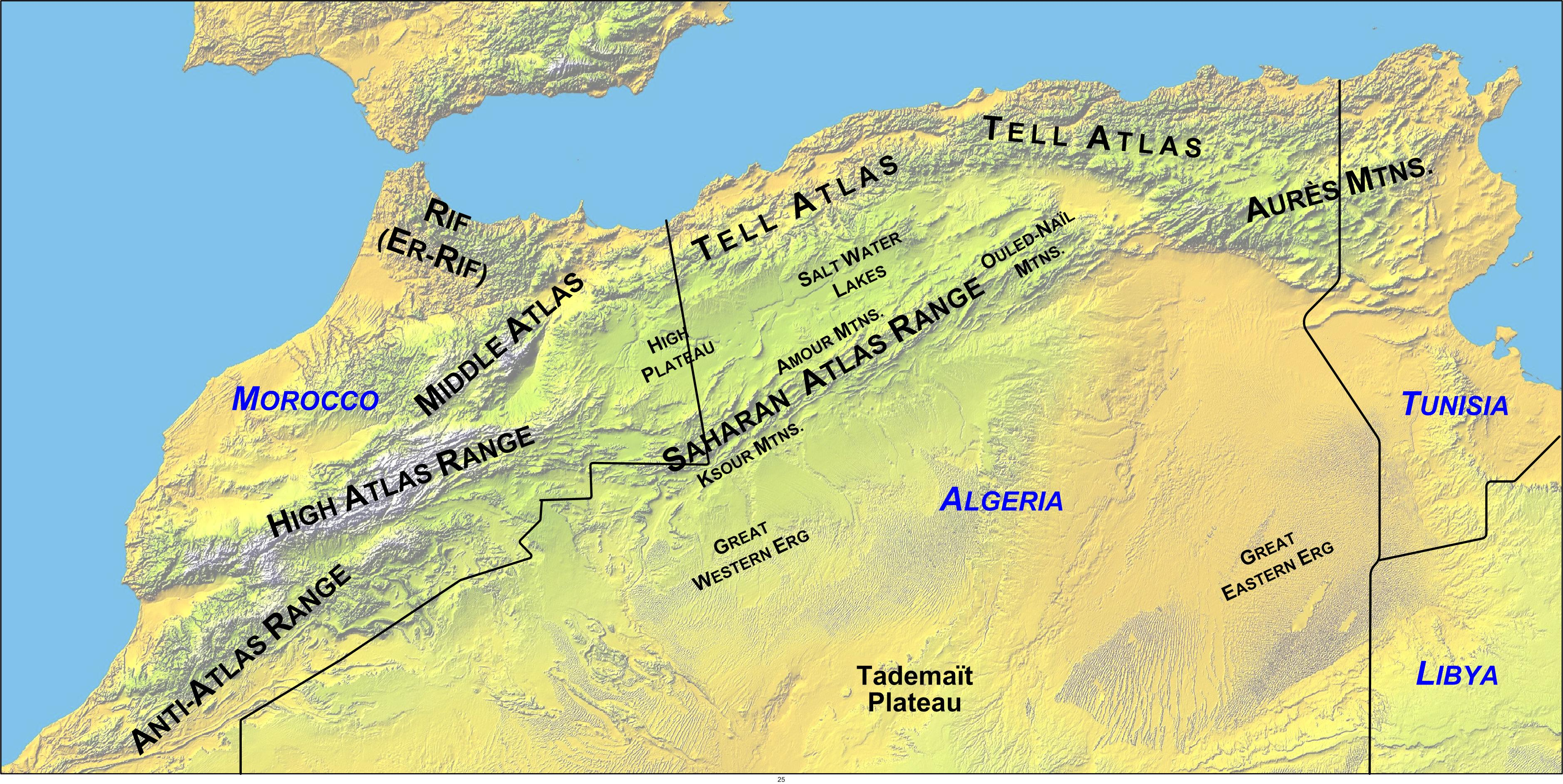
- Location of the Middle Atlas in North Africa
- Country: Morocco
- Range coordinates: 33°30′N 4°30′W
- Parent range: Atlas Mountain System

The Middle Atlas (Amazigh: ⴰⵟⵍⴰⵚ ⴰⵏⴰⵎⵎⴰⵙ, Atlas Anammas, Arabic: الأطلس المتوسط, al-Aṭlas al-Mutawassiṭ) is a mountain range in Morocco. It is part of the Atlas mountain range, a mountainous region with more than 100,000 km^{2}, 15 percent of its landmass, rising above 2,000 metres. The Middle Atlas is the northernmost and second highest of three main Atlas Mountains chains of Morocco. To south, separated by the Moulouya and Um Er-Rbiâ rivers, lies the High Atlas. The Middle Atlas form the westernmost end of a large plateaued basin extending eastward into Algeria, also bounded by the Tell Atlas to the north and the Saharan Atlas to the south, both lying largely in Algeria. North of the Middle Atlas and separated by the Sebou River, lie the Rif mountains which are an extension of the Baetic System, which includes the Sierra Nevada in the south of Spain. The basin of the Sebou is not only the primary transportation route between Atlantic Morocco and Mediterranean Morocco but is an area, watered by the Middle Atlas range, that constitutes the principal agricultural region of the country.

The Barbary macaque is native to the Middle Atlas, and chief populations occur only in restricted range in parts of Morocco and Algeria. Snow persists in the Middle Atlas in the winter and can appear starting at 600 m above sea level.

== Geography and ecology ==
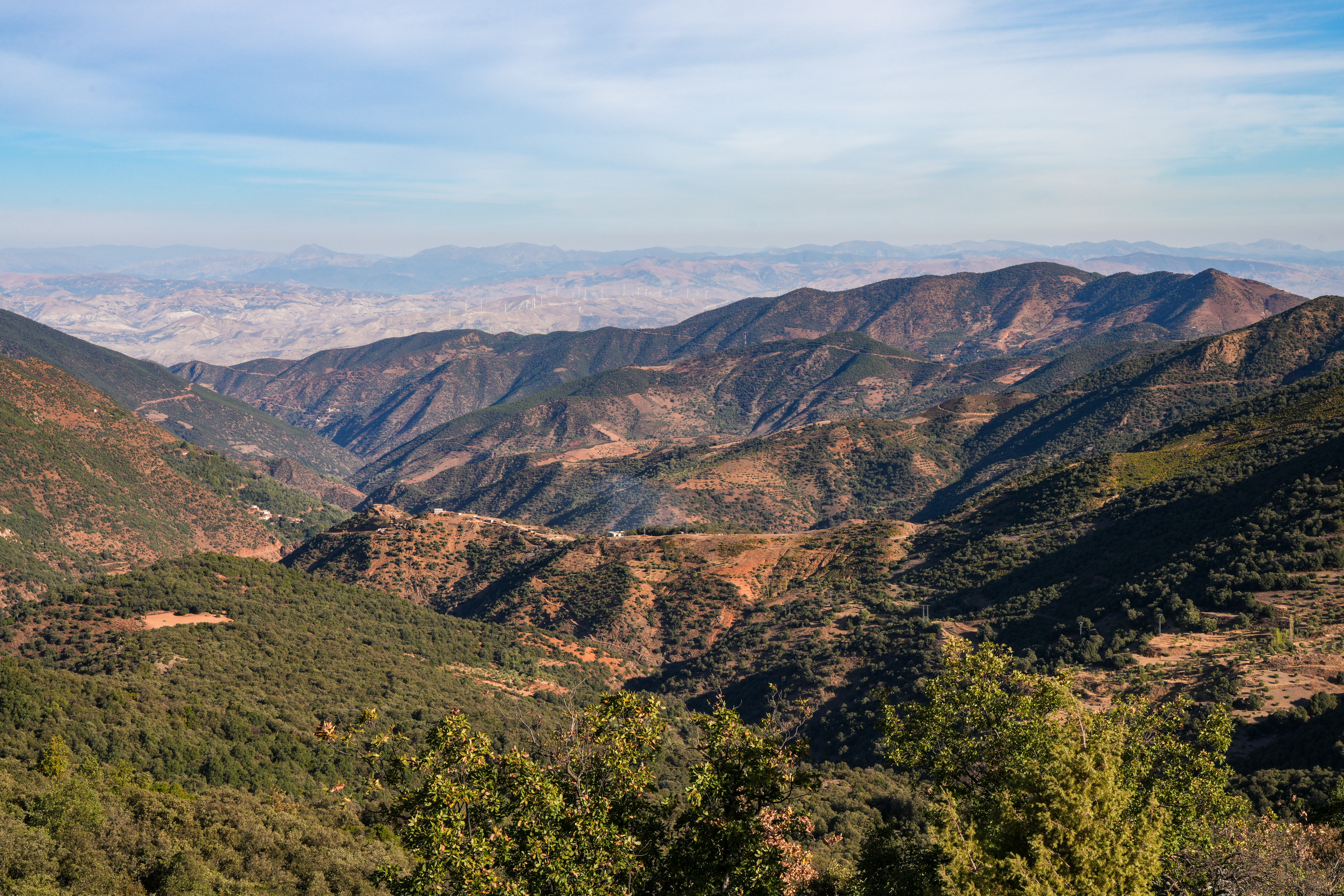
Rugged, forested terrain of Tazekka National Park

The Middle Atlas provinces cover 23,000 km^{2} in area, and comprise 18% of the total mountainous surface of Morocco. The provinces of Khénifra, Ifrane, Boulmane, Sefrou, Khemisset, El Hajeb as well as parts of the provinces of Taza and of Beni Mellal lie in the Middle Atlas region. Béni Mellal on the Oum Er-Rbia River is designated "the doorway to the Middle Atlas".

The Middle Atlas is a solid mountainous mass of 350 km in length in the north-east of Morocco with a unique charm that includes Jbel Hebri, a cone volcano. Its biodiversity, both in fauna and flora, make Middle Atlas a significant tourist destination. The region is noted for occurrence of the endangered primate, Barbary macaque, Macaca sylvanus; this monkey prehistorically had a much wider distribution throughout northern Morocco. Wild boar and polecat are also found within the Middle Atlas Range.

Its geo-morphologic structure is:

- Primarily limestone.
- Tabled rock in the west, running to elevations of 800 to 1,000 metres.
- Folded rock toward the northeast and running to elevations exceeding 3000 m, with a highest point, the Jbel Bou Naceur at 3340 m.
- Interspersed with volcanic plateaus.

Over the mountain slopes, extensive forests of cedar spread, intersected by deep valleys. Bordered by the rich Plaine du Saïs and the cities of Fes, Meknes and Beni Mellal, the mountainous reaches of the Middle Atlas are the stronghold of Berber tribes, speaking Tamazight and living at very low population densities.

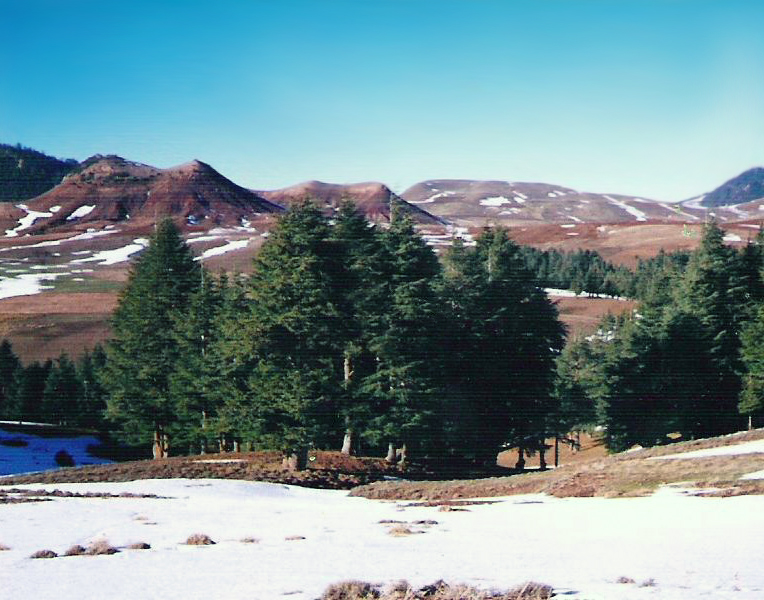
Area of cedars of Khénifra

The Middle Atlas is crossed by one of the principal access roads to the south of Morocco, connecting Fes with Tafilalet. Located at the northeast of Atlas. The Middle Atlas ends in the east at Tazekka National Park, with a landscape replete with narrow canyons and caves. In the south of Sefrou, the forests of cedars, of holm oak and of cork oak alternate with plates volcanic stripped and small full of fish lakes. The jewel of the Middle Atlas is the Ifrane National Park, located between Khenifra and Ifrane.

The highest point of the Middle Atlas is Jbel Bou Naceur (3340 m). 15 km north west lies second highest mountain massif of Moussa ou Sabel (3172 m) and Jbel Bou Iblane (3081 m), which lies close to Immouzer Marmoucha.

== Climate ==
Because of its elevation, the Middle Atlas experiences snow during the winter months and a cool climate during the summer. The town of Ifrane enjoys sufficient snow during the winter months that it provides accommodations quite rare in Africa: it is a ski resort.

== Major catchments ==
The Middle Atlas includes four major catchment areas:

- The basin of Sebou: of a surface of approximately 40,000 km^{2}, discharging to the Atlantic Ocean.
- The basin of Oum Errabiaa: extends on a surface from 35,000 km^{2}, discharging to the Atlantic Ocean.
- The basin of Bou Regreg: cover a surface of about 10,000 km^{2}, discharging to the Atlantic Ocean.
- The basin of Moulouya: takes its source in the Almssid region and drains both the Middle and the High Atlas, with a watershed of 74,000 km^{2}, discharging to the Mediterranean.

The Middle Atlas contributes abundant and the relatively regular flows to these rivers. Reservoirs have been developed for flood control, to improve tourism, and to create water reserves supporting the development of the arboriculture important to the agricultural industry of the region.

== See also ==
- Mediterranean woodlands and forests
- Cèdre Gouraud Forest
- Idriss I (dam)
- Ouergha River
- Lake Ouiouane
- Lake Dayet Ifrah
