= Lake Dayet Ifrah =

Lake in Fez-Meknes, Morocco

Lake Ifrah
- ضاية إفراح (Moroccan Arabic)
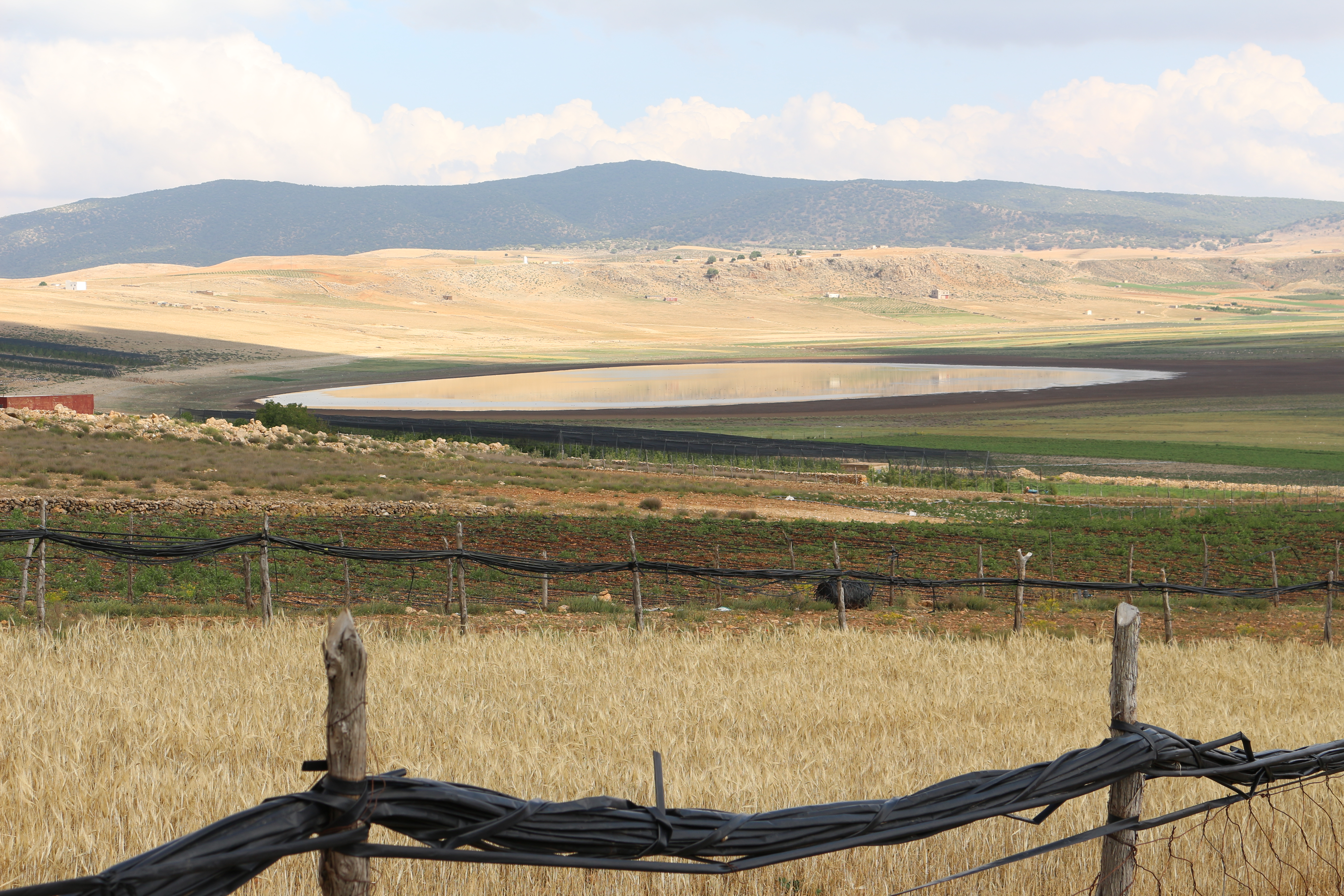
- Interactive map of Lake Ifrah
- Location: Ifrane Province
- Coordinates: 4°55′48″N 36°33′33″W
- Type: Lake
- Basin countries: Morocco
- Surface area: 2.5 km^{2} (0.97 sq mi)
- Max. depth: 8 m (26 ft)

Lake Ifrah (Arabic: Dayet Ifrah) is a lake in the community of Dayat Aoua in Ifrane Province. It is situated along the Middle Atlas scenic tourist route that traverses numerous other regional lakes. The lake covers an area of approximately 250 hectares and experiences notable fluctuations in its size depending on the year and season. Its maximum depth reaches 8 m (26 ft). This lake is mainly fed by groundwater, surface runoff, and snowmelt.

== Gallery ==
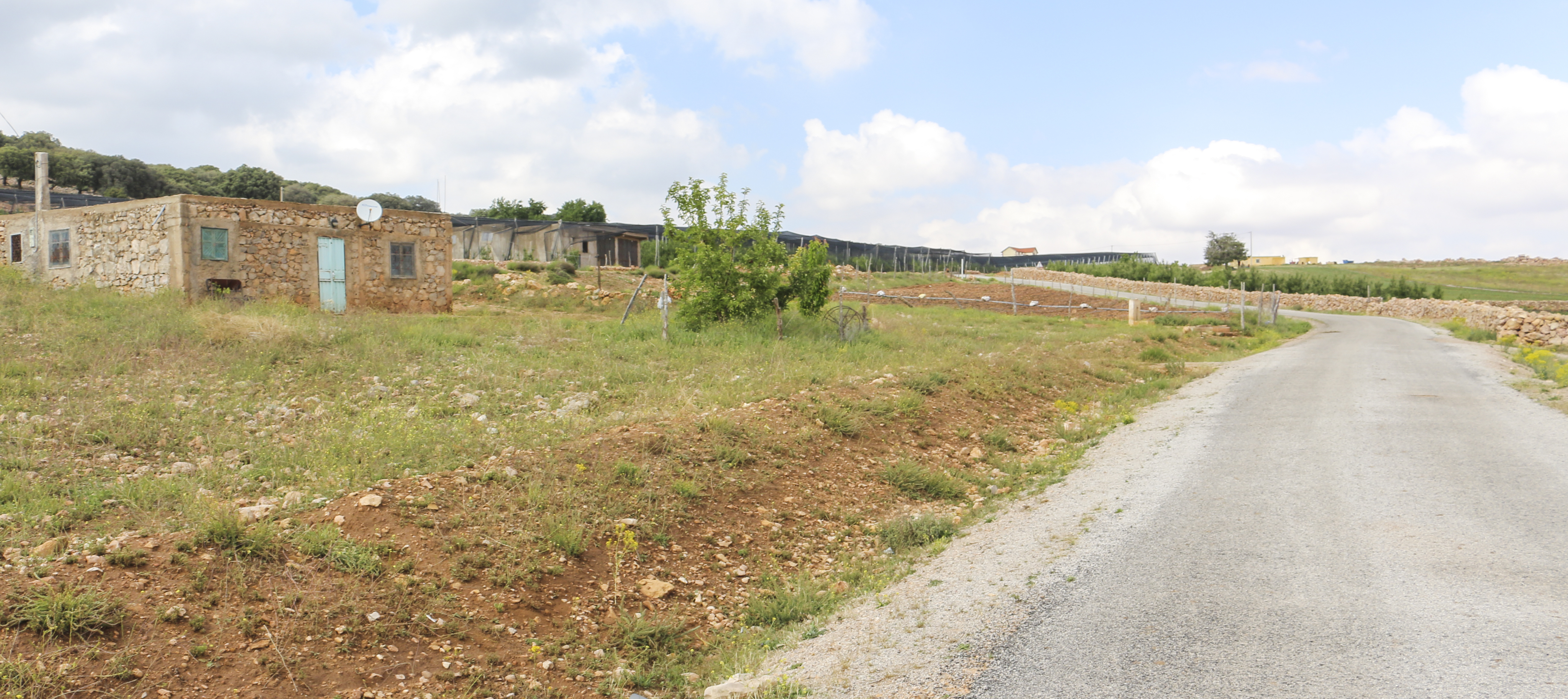

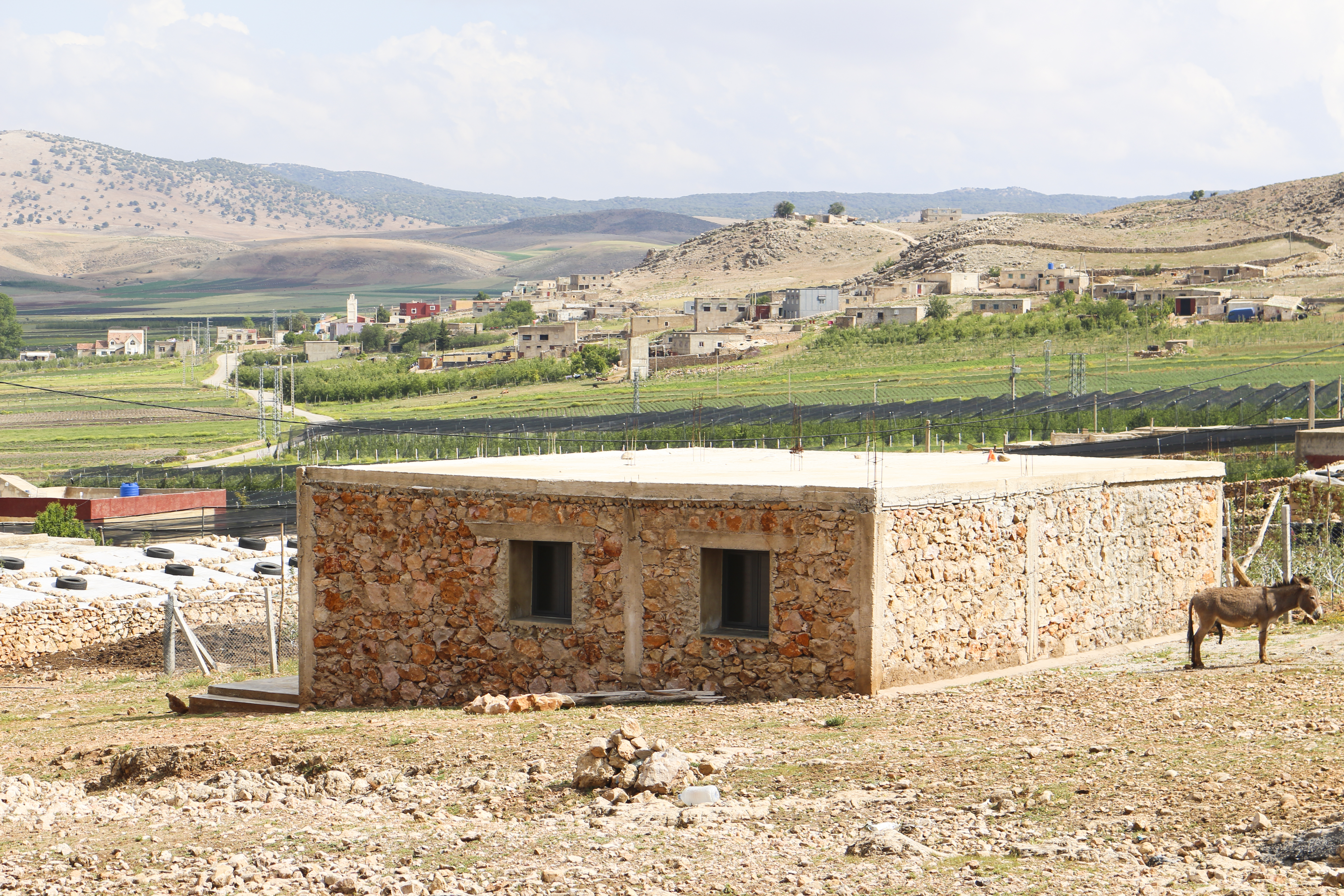

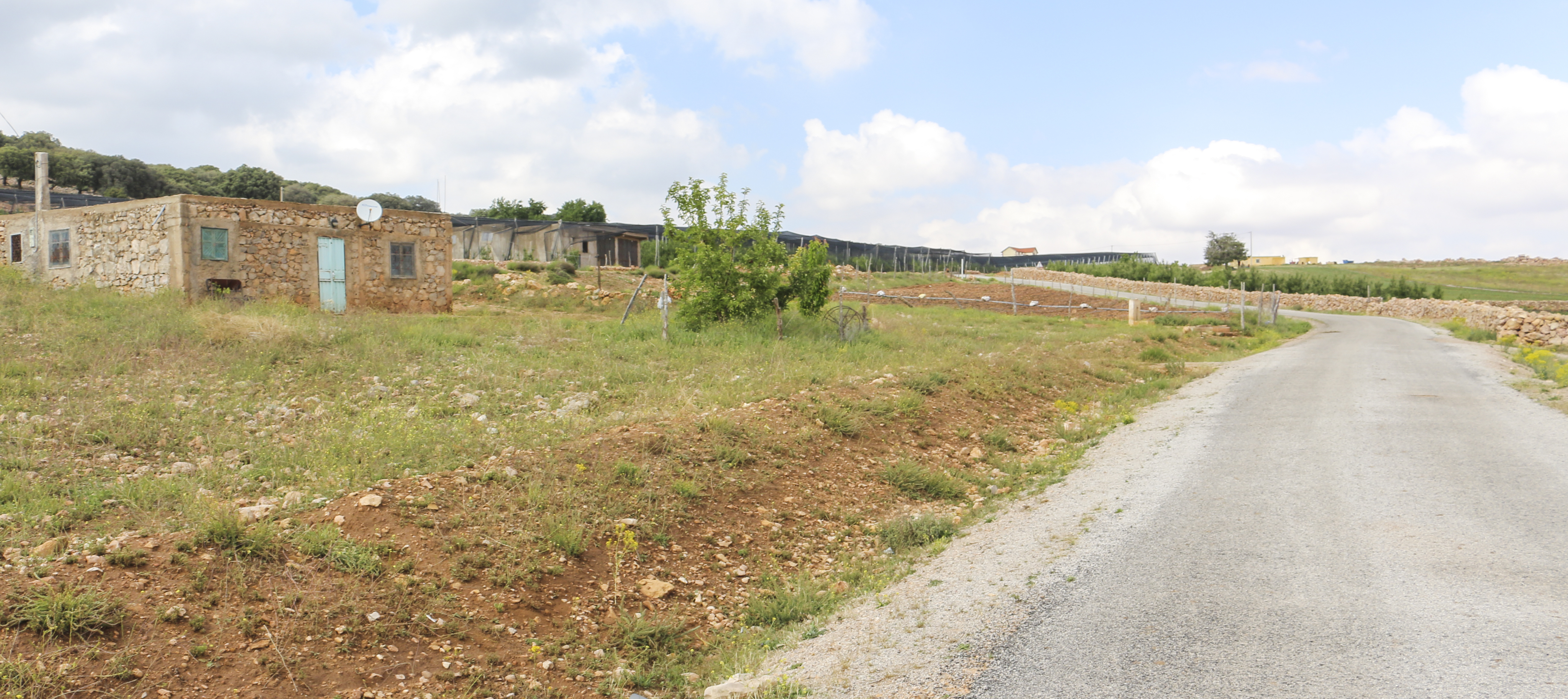

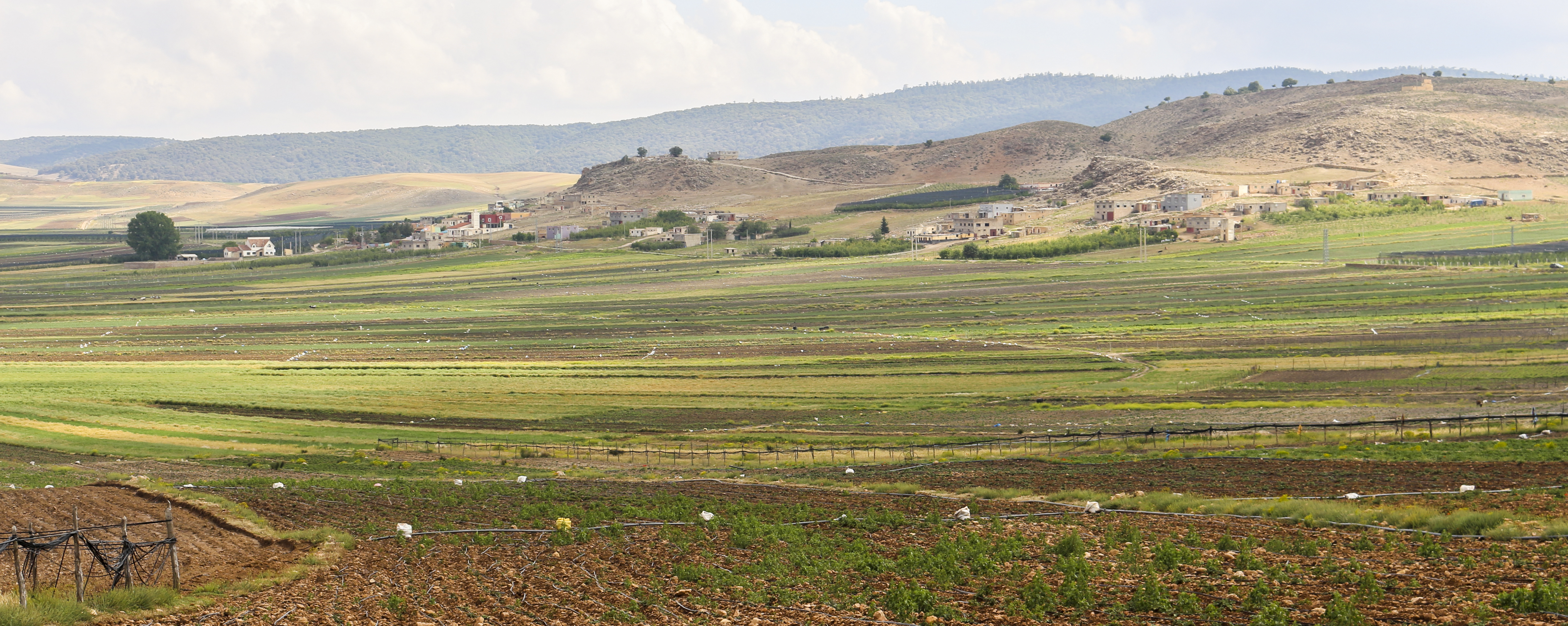

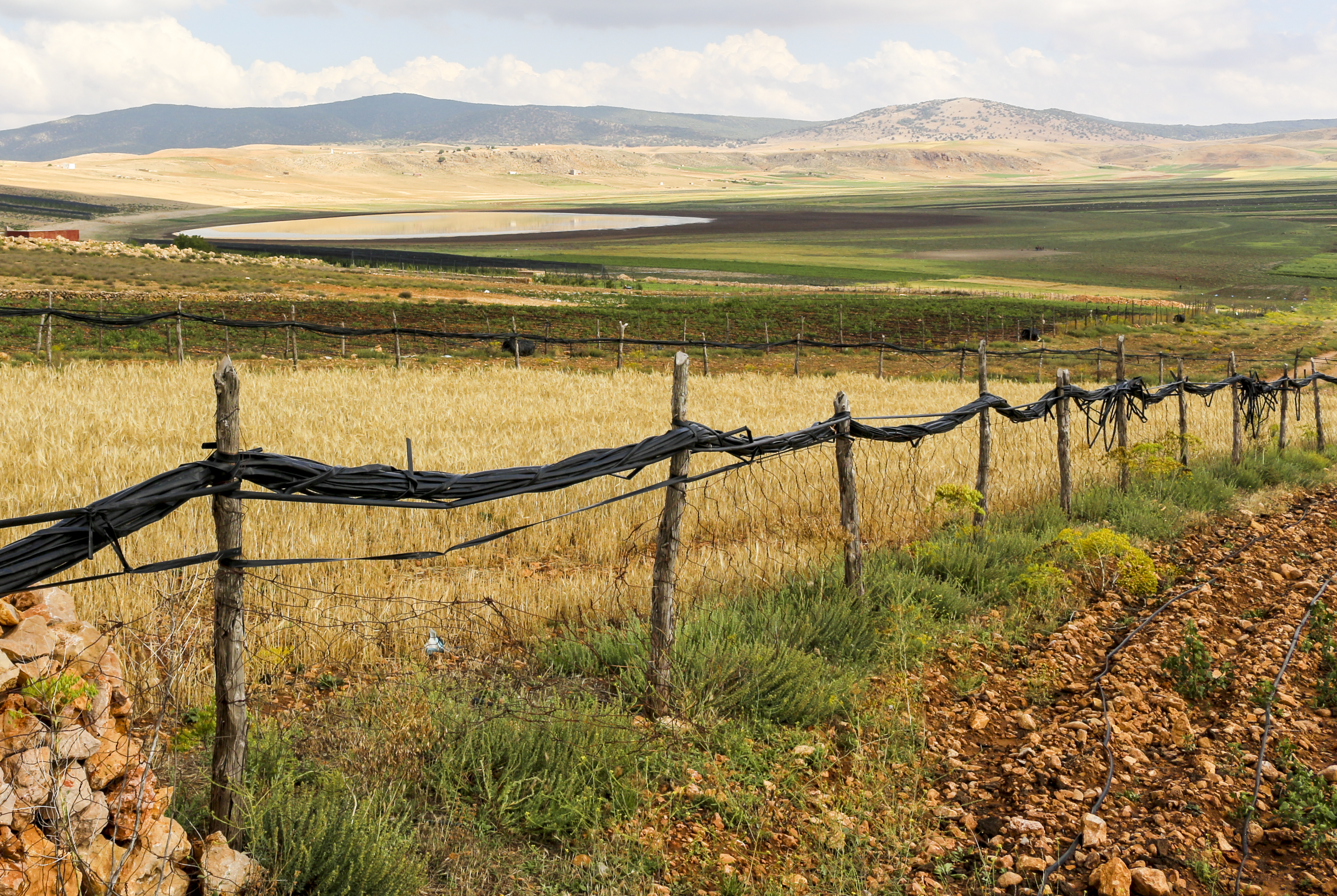

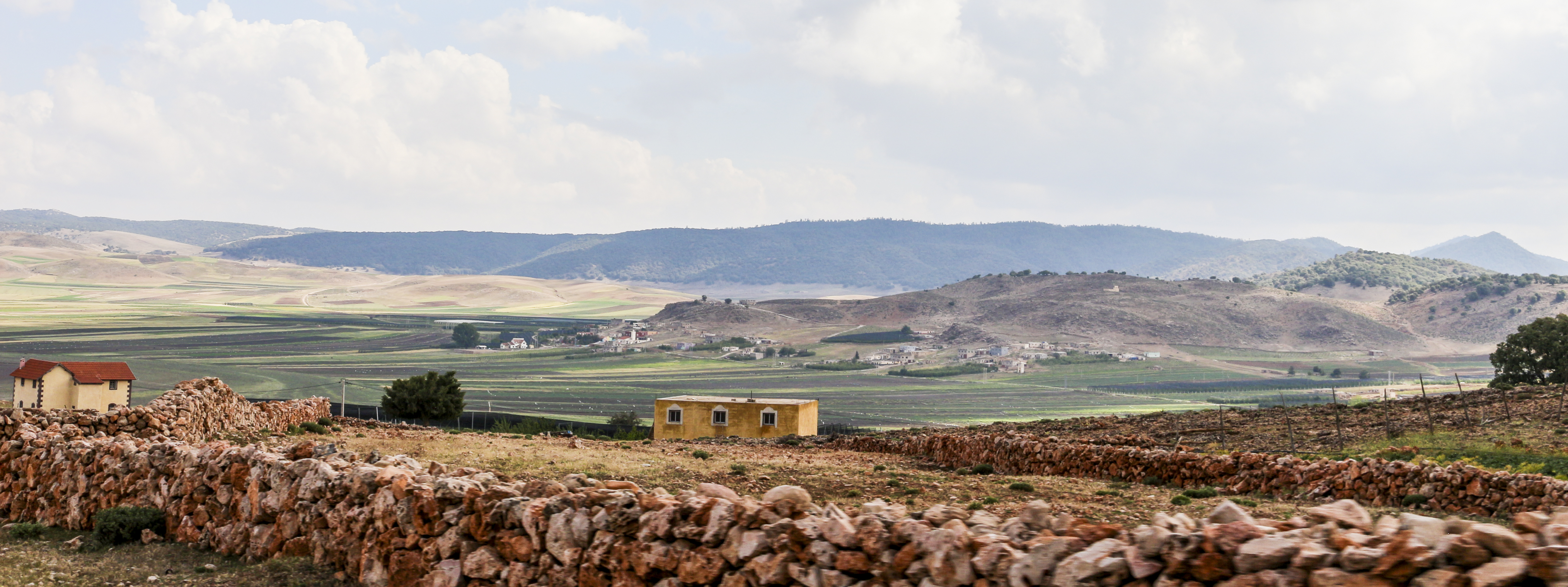

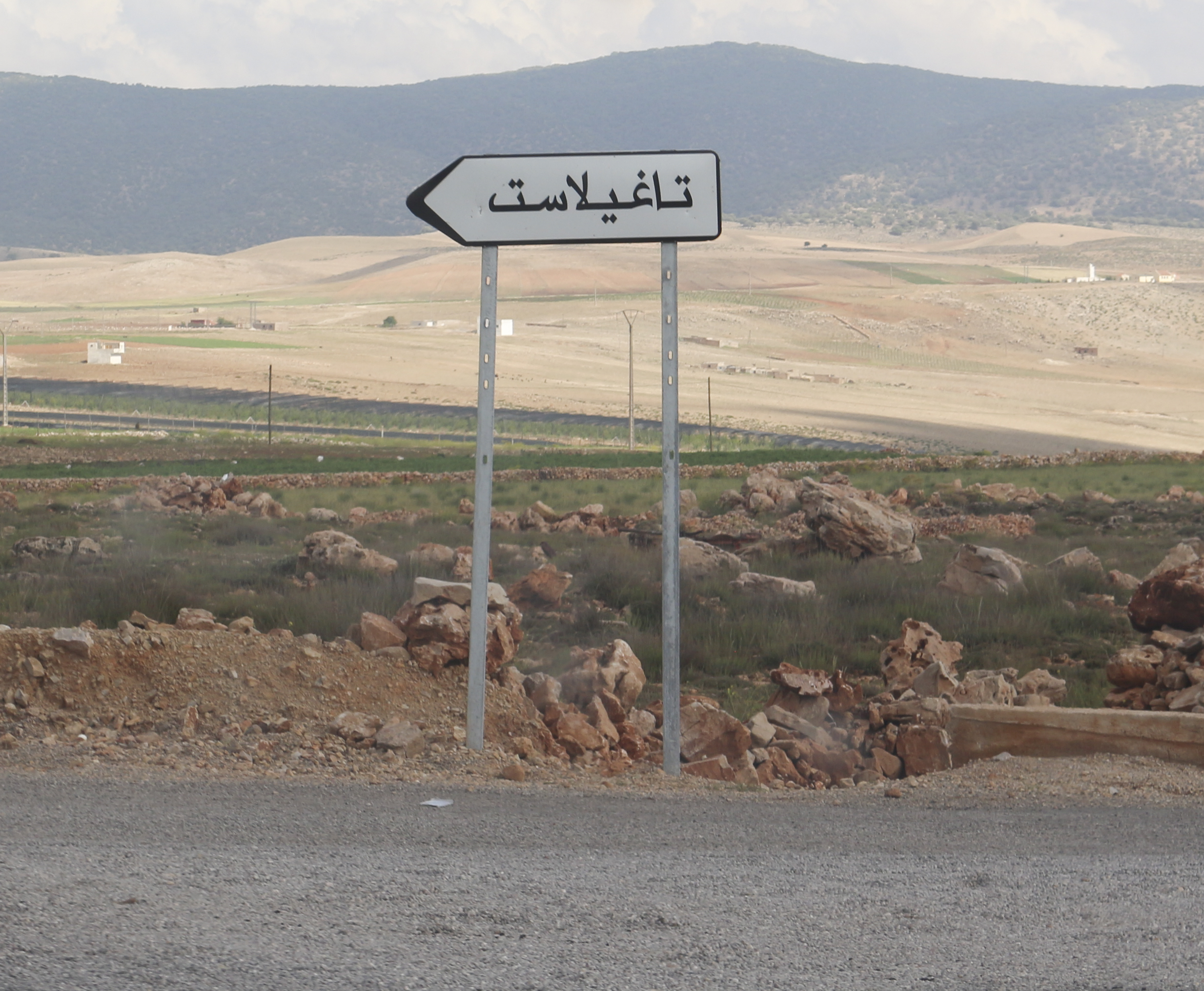

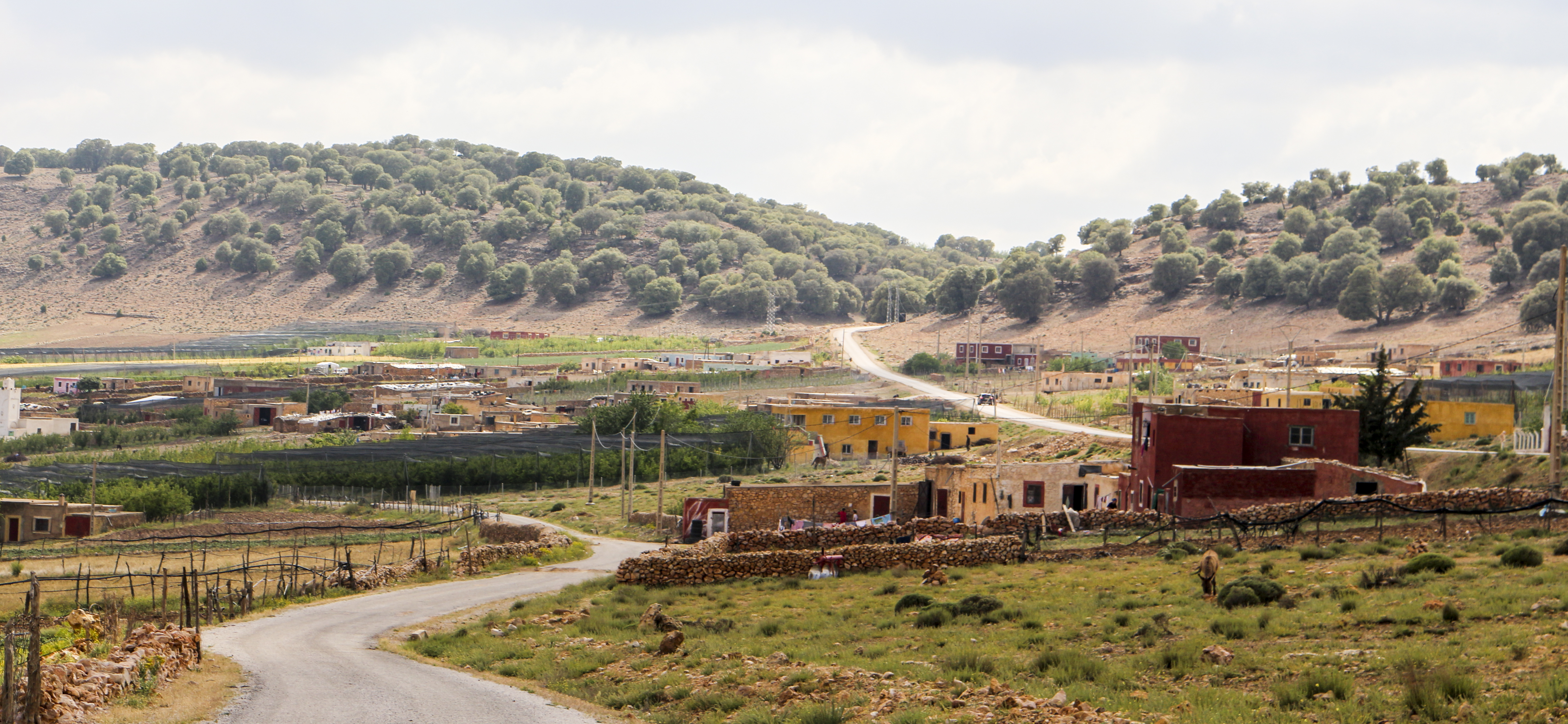

== See also ==
- Al-Maamora Forest
- Akalamm Abkhane
- Chott Tinsilt
- Sabkha Zamoul
- Ben Aknoun Forest
- Lake Zerrouka
