= Khenifra =

Khenifra خنيفرة (Arabic) ⵅⵏⵉⴼⵔⴰ (Standard Moroccan Tamazight)
- City
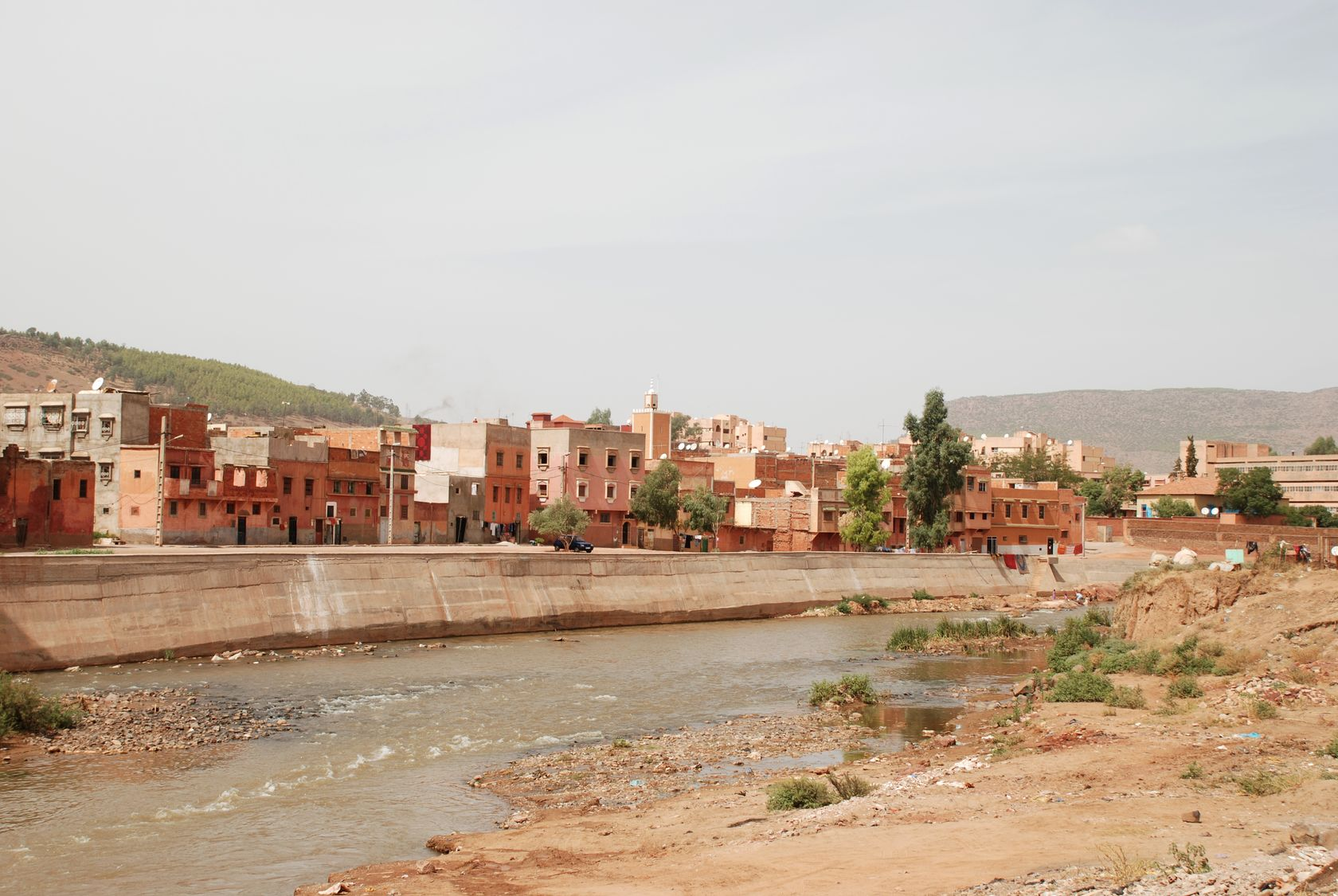
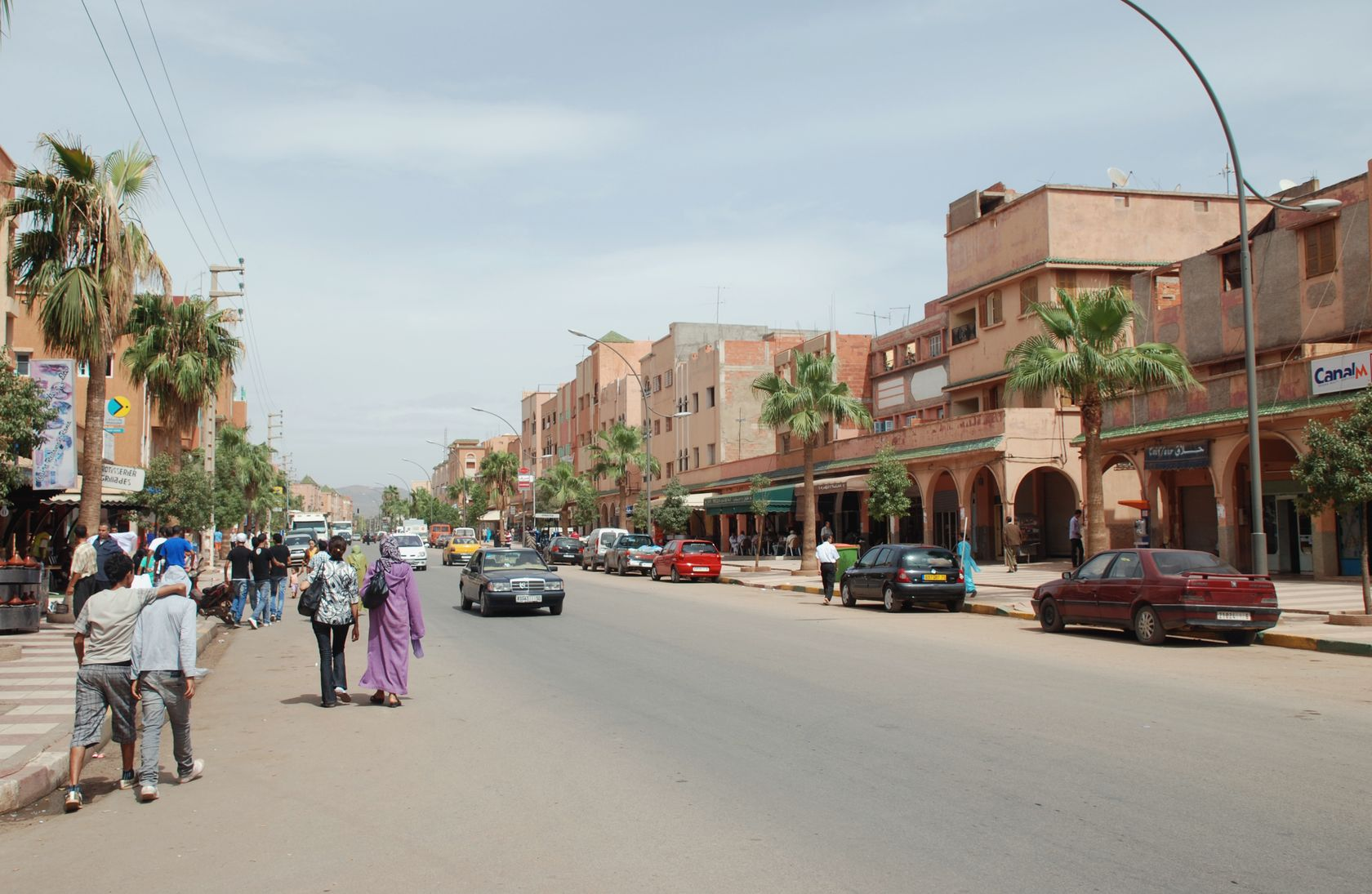
- Interactive map of Khenifra
- Coordinates: 32°56′22″N 5°40′3″W
- Country: Morocco
- Region: Béni Mellal-Khénifra
- Province: Khenifra

Population (2024)
  - Total: 123,738
  - Rank: 30th in Morocco
- Time zone: UTC+0 (GMT)

Khenifra (Note: Arabic: خنيفرة, Standard Moroccan Tamazight: ⵅⵏⵉⴼⵔⴰ) is a city in northern central Morocco, surrounded by the Atlas Mountains and located on the Oum Er-Rbia River. National Highway 8 also goes through the town. The population, as of the 2024 census, was at 123,738.

== History ==
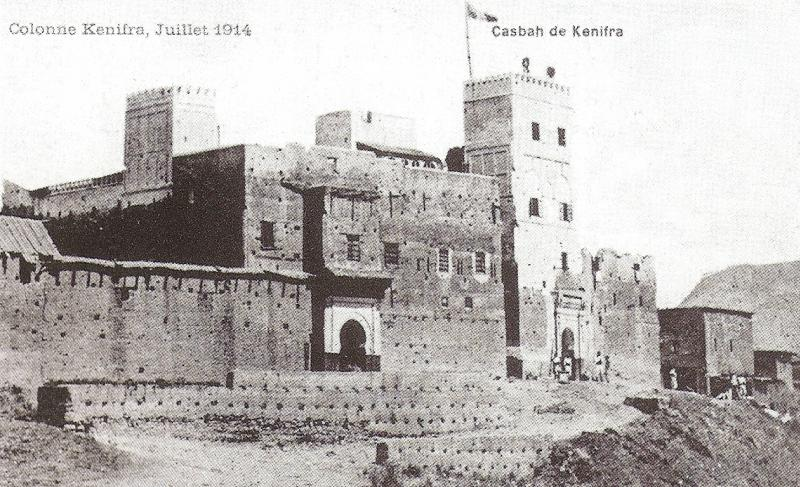
The Kasbah (igherm) of Khenifra c. 1914

Khenifra has been the Zayanes' central town for centuries. As such, it was an important military holding in the Zaian War. French General Paul Prosper Henrys had planned to lead the first attack on Khenifra on 10 June 1914. There would be three columns of troops, totaling up to 14,000 officers, to take Khenifra from the Zayanes control. One column was under Lieutenant-Colonel Henri Claudel, one under Colonel Gaston Cros, and one under Colonel Noël Garnier-Duplessix. Mouha ou Hammou Zayani led troops to attempt to stop the Khenifra campaign, but was eventually unsuccessful. The French took control of the town, losing around 600 men in the process. In addition to leading the Zayanes, Hammou was responsible for much of the early 20th century development of Khenifra, having overseen the development of accommodations and mosques in the town.

== Demography ==
Khenifra is inhabited by Zayanes, a Berber tribe, and the language spoken is a variety of Central Atlas Tamazight. The town's population as of the 2024 census was 123,738.

== Geography ==
Khenifra is located on the Oum Er-Rbia River National Highway 8 goes through Khenifra, and can provide travel to Marrakesh and Fez. Jebel Bououzzal, "Iron Mountain", provides a source of iron, but its usefulness is limited due to also having a high sulphur content. Khenifra National Park is east of the town, which contains forests of Atlas cedars (Cedrus atlantica) and Lake Ouiouane.

== Sports ==
The best known sport was soccer; the team was created in 1943 under the name: "Khenifra Union Club", Then Chabab Atlas Khénifra. In addition to a men's team, the club established a women's squad on 30 November 1998.

== Notable people ==
- Jaouad Gharib, former long-distance runner
- Mohamed Rouicha, Moroccan singer and songwriter
