= Akalamm Abkhane =

Lake in Khénifra Province, Morocco

- Black Lake (البحيرة السوداء (Arabic))
- بحيرة أكلمام أبخان (Arabic)
- Location within Morocco
- Interactive map of Akalamm Abkhane
- Location: Khénifra Province
- Coordinates: 32.91°N 5.34°W
- Type: Lake
- Part of: Khenifra National Park
- Primary outflows: Evaporation
- Basin countries: Morocco
- Surface area: 7 hectares (17 acres)
- Max. depth: 2 m (7 ft)
- Surface elevation: 1,700 m (5,600 ft)

Akalamm Abkhane (also known as the Black Lake) is a lake situated approximately 38 km (24 mi) from the Khénifra Province. It represents a notable environmental landmark within the Khenifra Province, particularly within the Temdaghas Ait Lahcen region.

The lake is home to various avian species, including geese and black chickens. However, it is devoid of fish due to the presence of toxic minerals, such as lead, and the high salinity of its waters.

The lake is a natural area fed by springs and underground sources, particularly notable for their depth, especially on the eastern side. The lake is situated at an altitude of 1,700 m (5,600 ft), spanning an area of approximately 7 hectares (17 acres), with a depth of up to 2 m (7 ft).
