= List of Research Centers in Morocco =

Research Centers in Morocco	Field of activity
Laboratory for Research on Comparative Democratic Transition (LRCDT), Settat	Social Sciences
Laboratoire d'Etudes Politiques et de Sciences Humaines et Sociales (LEPOSHS), Rabat	Humanities and Social Sciences
Center for Studies and Research in Humanities and Social Sciences (CERHSO), Oujda	Humanities and Social Sciences
Royal Institute for Strategic Studies (IRES), Rabat	Strategic Studies
Centre for Studies and Research on International Migration and Sustainable Development (CERMID), Casablanca	Migration and Development
Moroccan Center for Contemporary Studies and Research (CMERC), Rabat	Social Sciences & Humanities to Study Values
Centre for Studies and Research in Social Sciences (CERS), Rabat	Social Sciences
Centre d’Etudes Sociales, Economiques et Managériales (CESEM), Casablanca	Social Sciences
Centre Jacques Berque pour le Développement des Sciences Humaines et Sociales au Maroc (CJB), Rabat	Humanities & Social Sciences
Hillary Rodham Clinton Women’s Empowerment Center, Ifrane	Humanities & Social Sciences
Interdisciplinary Moroccan Center for Strategic and International Studies (CMIESI), Fez	International and Strategic Studies
Centre Marocain de Conjoncture (CMC), Rabat	Social Sciences
Research Institute for Development, Rabat	Development Studies
Center for Demographic Studies and Research (CERD), Rabat	Demographic Studies
Royal Institute for Research in the History of Morocco (IRRHM), Rabat	History of the Kingdom of Morocco
Center for Legal, Economic, and Social Studies (LINKS), Rabat	Social Sciences
Moroccan Center for Strategic Studies (CMES), Rabat	Strategic Studies
National Center for Scientific and Technical Research, Rabat	Scientific Research
National Institute for Agricultural Research (INRA), Rabat	Agricultural Research
Institute for African Studies, Rabat	African Studies
Moroccan Institute for Scientific and Technical Information (IMIST), Rabat	Research Information Technology
Pasteur Institute in Morocco, Casablanca	Medicine
Scientific Institute at Mohammed V University, Rabat	Natural Science
Research Institute for Solar Energy and New Energies (IRESEN), Rabat	Renewable Energy
National Institute Research for Fishery Research, Casablanca	Fishery
National Institute of Statistics and Applied Economics, Rabat	Statistics and Applied Economics
Moroccan Association for Research and Development, Casablanca	Research and Development
Moroccan Society of Rheumatology, Rabat	Medicine
Moroccan Association for Studies and Research on Migration, Rabat	Migration
National Institute for Urban Planning and Urbanism	Urbanism
Institute of Economic Analysis and Prospective Studies (IEAPS), Ifrane	Economic and Prospective Studies
Center for Business Ethics (CBE), Ifrane	Training and Research
Social Science Research Institute (SSRI), Ifrane	Social Sciences
RESO Education Foundation	Education
Mominoun Without Borders, Rabat	Social Sciences
Social and Media Studies Institute (SMSI), Casablanca	Social Sciences and media studies
