= National Route 13 (Morocco) =

Road in Morocco

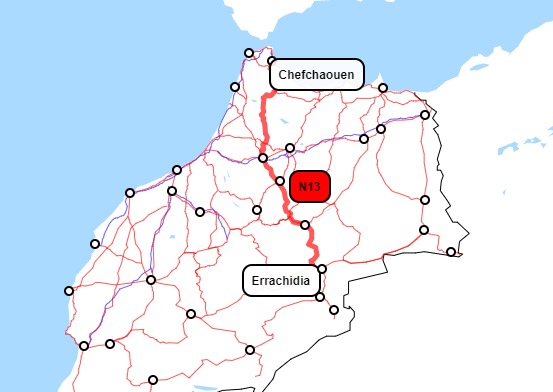

Major junctions
- North end: Fnideq
- South end: Taouz

Location
- Country: Morocco

Highway system
- Transport in Morocco

The N13 road is a national highway (Route nationale) in Morocco linking Taouz near Merzouga close to the Algerian border with Azrou, Meknes and other northern locations. North of Meknes there are views of the Zerhoun Mountains and along the N13 is the ancient Roman and Carthaginian settlement of Volubilis, the westernmost provincial capital of the Roman Empire. This Roman city overlies one of the earliest archaeologically recorded Neolithic settlements in Morocco.

== See also ==
- Barbary ape
