= Ifrane =

City in Morocco

Ifrane إفران (Arabic) ⵉⴼⵔⴰⵏ (Standard Moroccan Tamazight)
- City
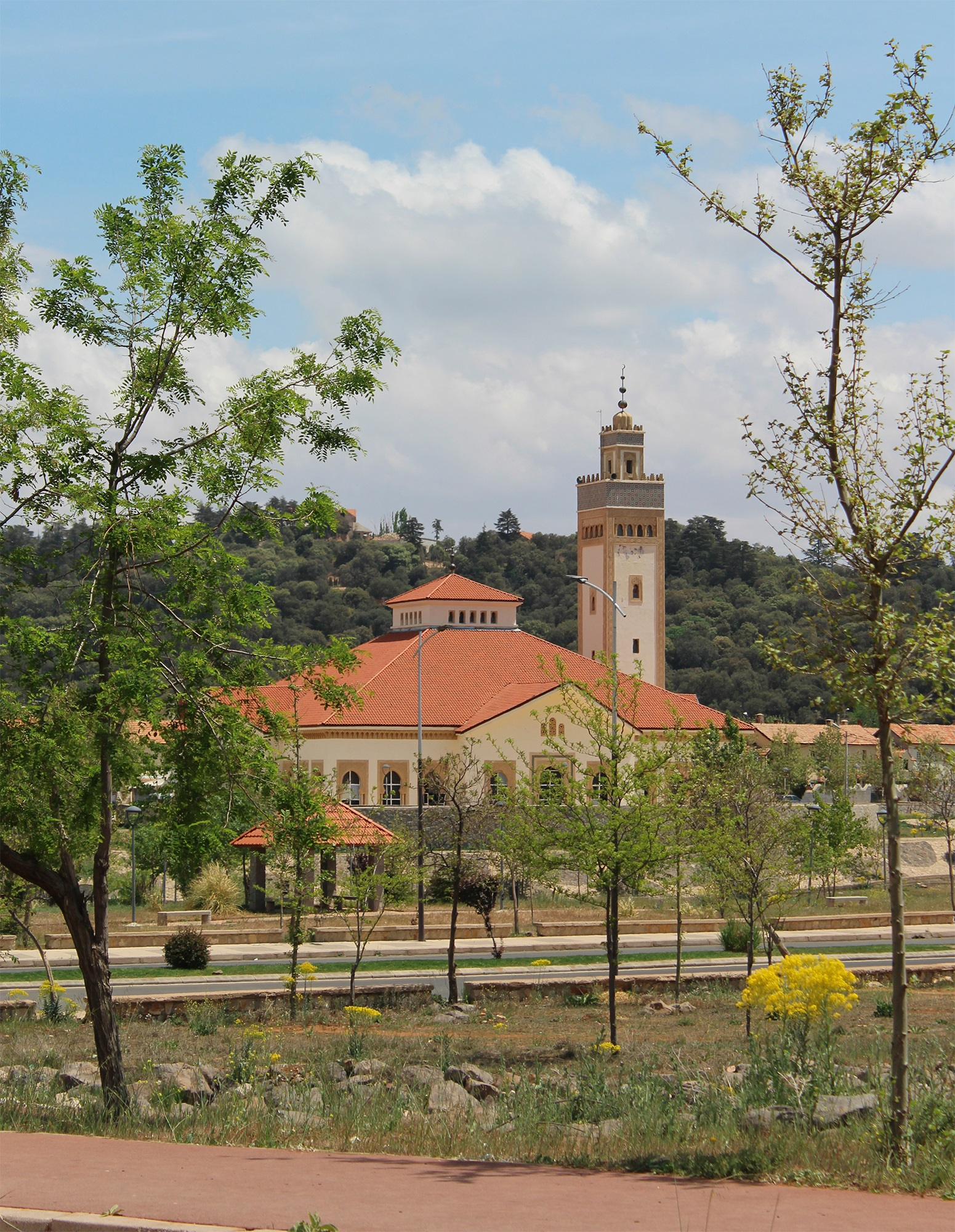

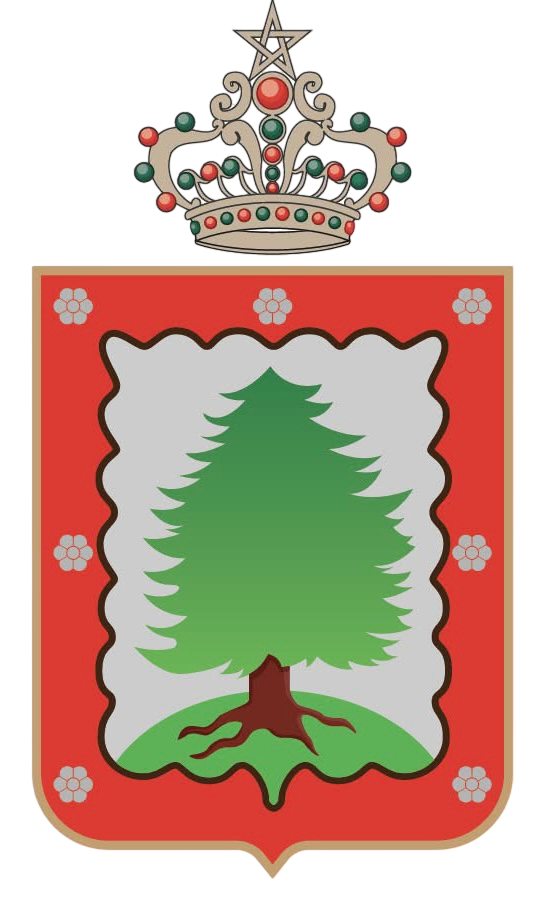
- Flag Seal
- Nickname: The Little Switzerland
- Interactive map of Ifrane
- Coordinates: 33°32′N 5°07′W
- Country: Morocco
- Region: Fès-Meknès
- Province: Ifrane Province
- Established: 1929

Government
  - Mayor: Abdeslam Lahrar
- Elevation: 1,665 m (5,463 ft)

Population (2024)
  - Total: 13,964
  - Density: 3.91/km^{2} (10.1/sq mi)
- Time zone: UTC+0 (GMT)
- Postal code: 53000
- Area code: 0535
- Website: communeifrane.ma

Ifrane (Note: Arabic: إفران Standard Moroccan Tamazight: ⵉⴼⵔⴰⵏ, lit. 'caves') is a city in the Middle Atlas region of northern Morocco. With a population of 13,964 inhabitants as of 2024. It is the capital of Ifrane Province in the Fez-Meknes region and is located at an elevation of more than 1,650 m (5,410 ft). The city is known for its relatively cold climate and winter snowfall and is one of Morocco’s prominent mountain tourism destinations.

The modern town was established by the French administration in 1929 during the protectorate era due to its Alpine climate, for which Ifrane was developed as a "hill station", a resort town set high up in the mountains so that Europeans could find relief from the summer heat of the interior plains, gaining it the Nickname "Little Switzerland" by locals. It is also considered one of the cleanest cities in the world.

Nearby Lake Dayet Iffer is a popular altitude training destination, other destinations include Ain Vital ('Virgin Falls'; ar), a spring located about 3 kilometers (1.9 mi) from the center of town.

The city serves primarily as a provincial administrative center and a college town.

== History ==
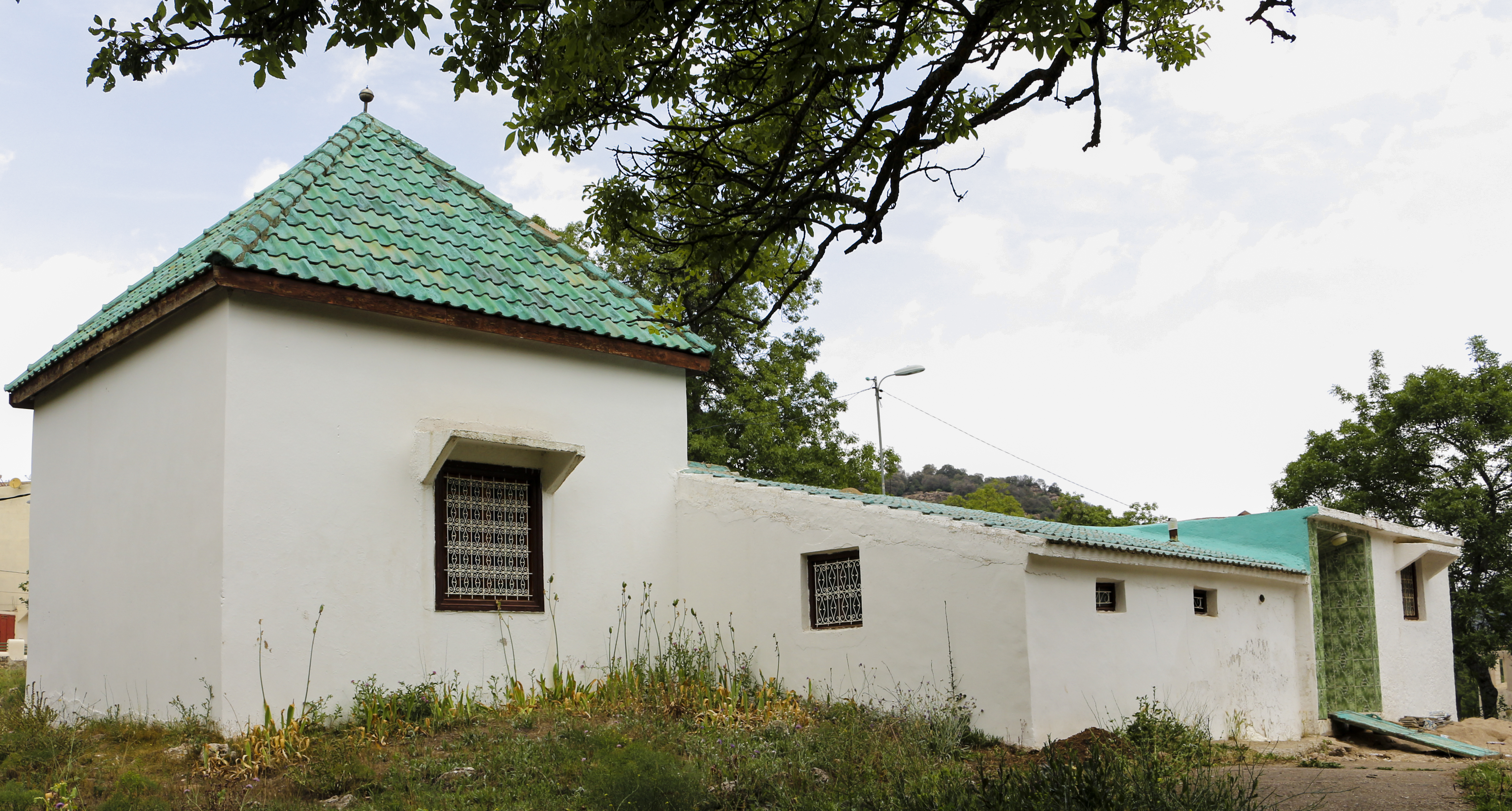
Shrine of Sidi Abdeslam

The first permanent settlement of the area dates to the 16th century, when a sharîf by the name of Sidi Abdeslam (ary) established his community in the Tizguit Valley, 9 kilometers (5.6 mi) downstream from the present town. In the Local Amazigh language, Ifran means "caves". Sidi Abdeslam’s village, called Zaouiat Sidi Abdessalam (fr), (or simply zâwiyah), consisted at first of cave dwellings hollowed out of the limestone valley wall. Only in the last fifty years or so have its inhabitants built houses aboveground. The caves which now lie under these houses are still used as mangers for animals and for storage.

By the mid-17th century Sidi Abdeslam’s zâwiya was established enough to receive an extensive iqta', or land grant, from the Alawi sultan Al-Rashid of Morocco. The iqta’ extended from upstream of present Ifrane down the Tizguit valley all the way to El Hajeb escarpment. Late in the 19th century, agro-pastoral groups of the Amazigh Sanhaja Beni M’guild and Zenata Ait Seghrouchen, crossing the Middle Atlas from the upper Moulouya Plain, started grazing their herds of sheep and goats on the surrounding plateau. The livelihood of the zâwiyah was based on irrigated agriculture on the valley floor, livestock grazing and forest resources.

The agricultural plots were held as private property (mulk or melk; similar to mülk), but the grazing land was under collective tribal jurisdiction (j’maa). The tribally organized populations of the Ifrane-Azrou area submitted to colonial rule after a period of resistance (1913–1917). Resistance continued higher in the mountains (Timahdite, Jebel Fazzaz) until 1922.

=== Modern history ===
City center

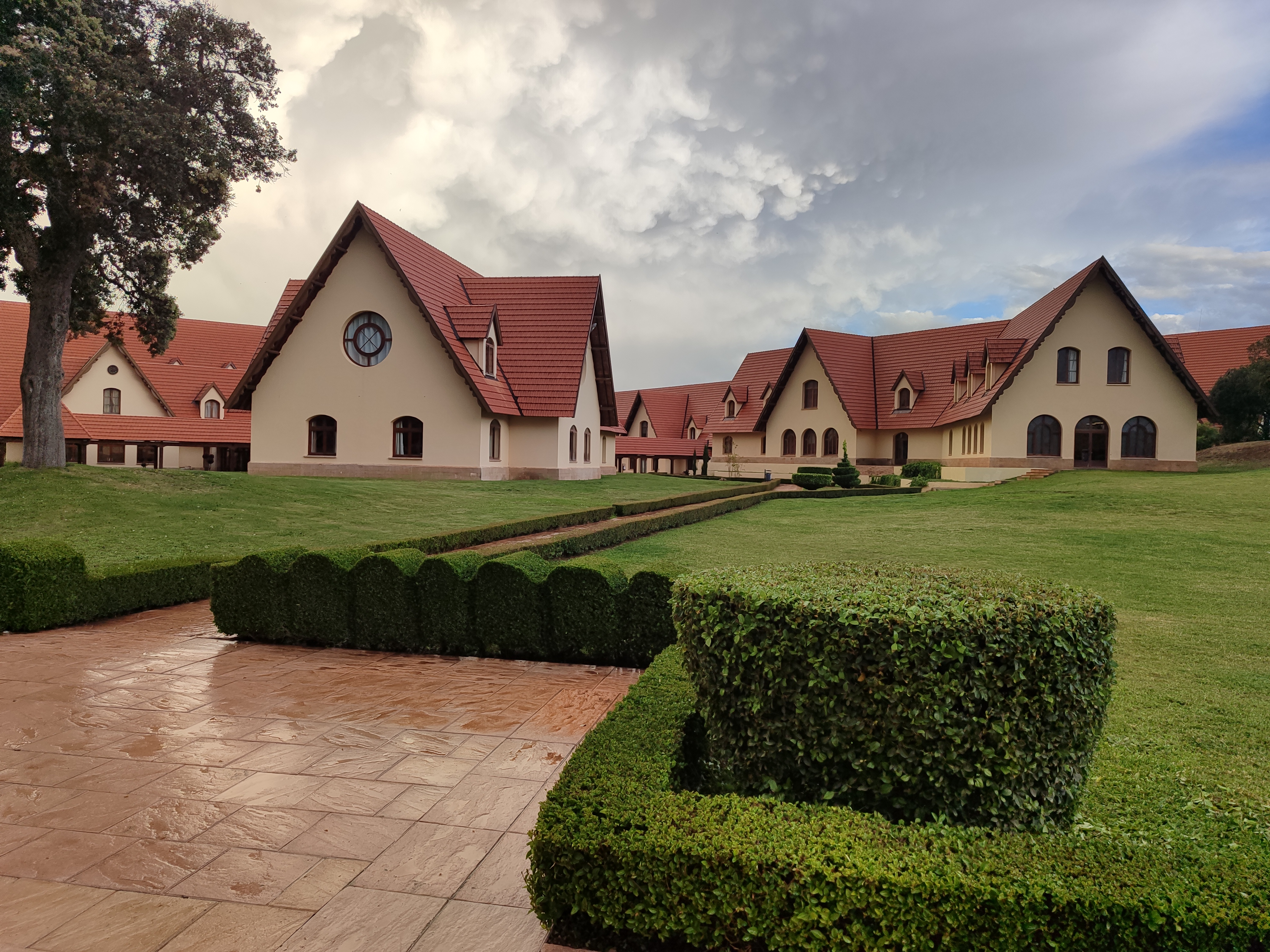
Al Akhawayn University campus

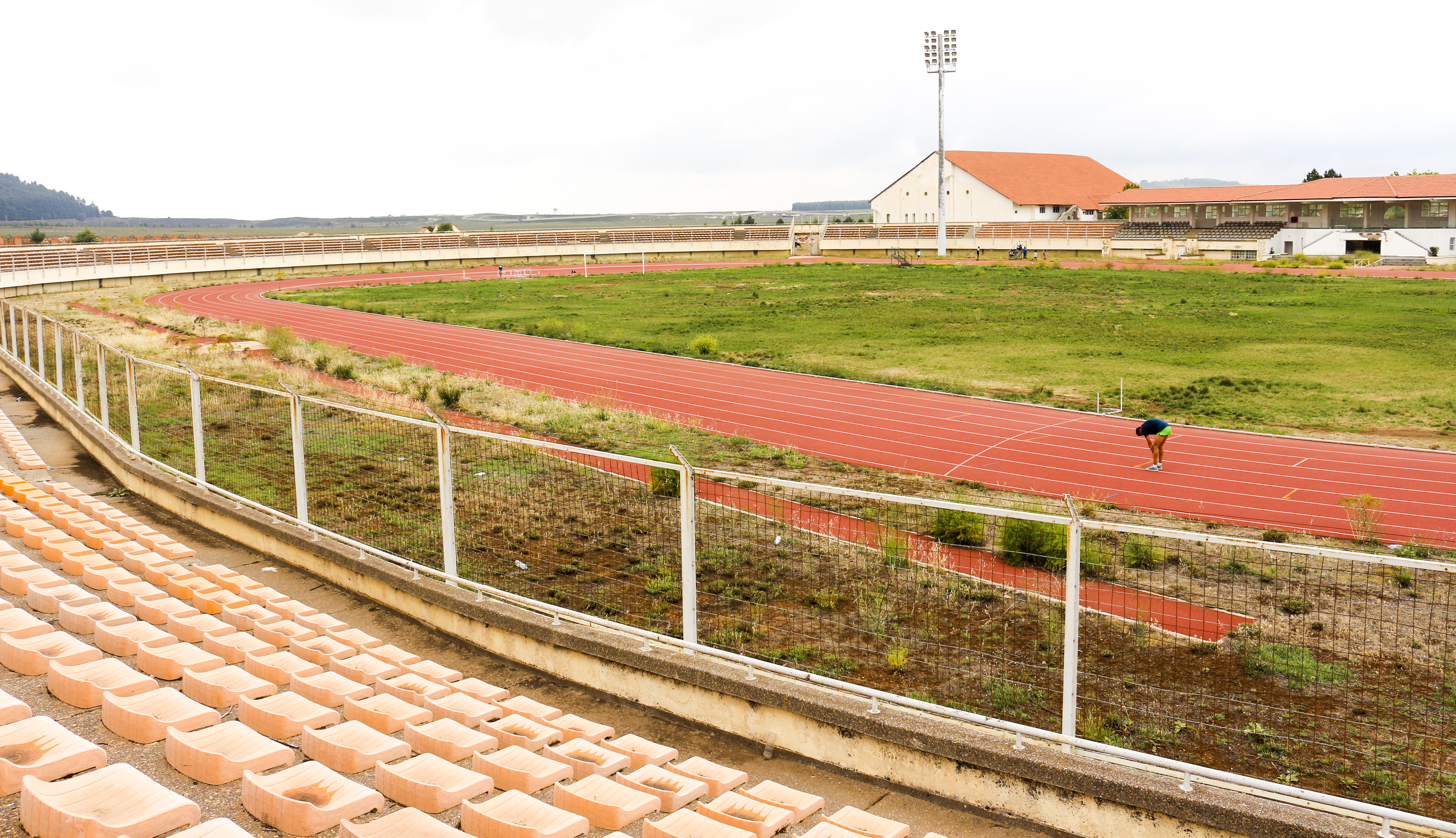
Ifrane sports complex

The modern town of Ifrane was established by the French administration in 1929 on land expropriated from the inhabitants of the zâwiya. The town was to be a "hill station", a cool place for colonial families to spend the hot summer months, and it was initially planned according to the "garden city" model of urban design then in vogue. The plan called for chalet-type summer homes in the Alpine style, laid out among gardens and curving tree-lined streets. A royal palace was also built for Sultan Mohammad V. The town's first public buildings consisted of a post office and a church. Moreover, a penitentiary was built which during World War II served as a POW camp.

The French had also built hill stations in neighboring Imouzzer Marmoucha, as well as at Oukaïmeden in the High Atlas. Hill stations share some common characteristics. As they are intended for expatriate European families, and they are often designed in such a way as to remind their foreign inhabitants of their distant homelands. The architectural style adopted is imported from the mother country in order that the place look like "Little England" or "douce France". This is the case in Ifrane where various mountain styles such as "maison basque" "Jura" and "Savoy" were used. Moreover, trees and flowering plants were also imported from Europe. This too was intended to heighten the appearance and feeling of home. In Ifrane, lilac trees, plane-trees (platanes), chestnut and horse-chestnut trees (marronniers and châtaigniers) and lime trees (tilleuls) were all imported for this purpose.

Not far from Ifrane in the Middle Atlas is Cèdre Gouraud Forest. A small fort overlooking Oued Tizguit (now part of the palace precinct) had already been built during the period of military conquest in order to secure the Fez to Khenifra road across the mountains. The gently rolling landscape, with fresh springs and wildflowers, was judged to have potential as a summer resort for colon families from the Saïss Plain (fr), Meknes and Fez. Fifty hectares of agricultural land upstream from the zâwiyah, in an area originally designated as Tourthit, or "garden", was expropriated for the project.

As elsewhere in Morocco, a shanty town called Timdiqîn soon grew up next to the colonial establishment. It housed the Moroccan population (maids, gardeners, etc.) that serviced the French vacationers. Timdiqîn was separated from the colonial garden city by a deep ravine. After independence, the French properties in the original garden city were slowly bought up by Moroccans. The town was enlarged and endowed with a mosque, a municipal market and public housing estates. Furthermore, the shanty neighborhood of Timdiqîn was rebuilt with proper civic amenities.

In 1979 Ifrane became the seat of the administrative province of the same name and some government services were established. In 1995 Al Akhawayn University, an English-language, American-curriculum public university opened and this has helped re-launch Ifrane as a desirable destination for domestic tourism. Consequently, Ifrane continued to develop as both a summer and winter resort. Old chalets in the center of town are being demolished and replaced with condominium complexes, while vacation centers and gated housing estates are springing up on the outskirts.

== Demographics ==
Ifrane had a population of 13,558 inhabitants according to the results of the 2024 census. The city's demographic structure is closely associated with the human geography of the Middle Atlas, whose areas surrounding Ifrane have historically been inhabited by Amazigh communities. Since the establishment of the modern town, Ifrane has also been affected by patterns of internal migration, particularly from the surrounding rural and mountainous areas.

The population of Ifrane Province was distributed across different age groups in 2024. People under the age of 15 accounted for approximately 25.6% of the total population, while those aged 15 to 59 represented 59.6%, and those aged 60 and over accounted for 14.8%. This age structure reflects a substantial proportion of the population within the working-age range, alongside significant shares of children, young people, and older adults. Differences between males and females across the age groups were relatively limited: people under 15 accounted for 27.0% of the male population, compared with 24.3% of the female population; those aged 15 to 59 represented 58.5% and 60.6%, respectively; while people aged 60 and over accounted for 14.5% of males and 15.1% of females.

Ifrane's demographic structure has also been shaped by population mobility associated with the city's development from a mountain settlement into an administrative, tourism, and educational centre. Rural exodus has been an important component of the city's population growth, with Ifrane attracting, over several decades, residents from surrounding villages and mountain settlements, as well as newcomers from other areas, drawn by the availability of administrative, educational, and healthcare services and employment opportunities in tourism and the service sector. This process contributed to the movement of part of the surrounding rural population into the urban area of Ifrane and broadened the city's population beyond the communities historically associated with the local area.

The city's demographic background is closely linked to the Amazigh cultural and linguistic area of the Middle Atlas, a connection reflected in the continued use of the Amazigh language across the province, although with marked differences between urban and rural areas. In Ifrane Province, 57.9% of the population reported using one of the Amazigh language varieties, with the proportion higher in rural areas than in urban areas.

== Culture ==
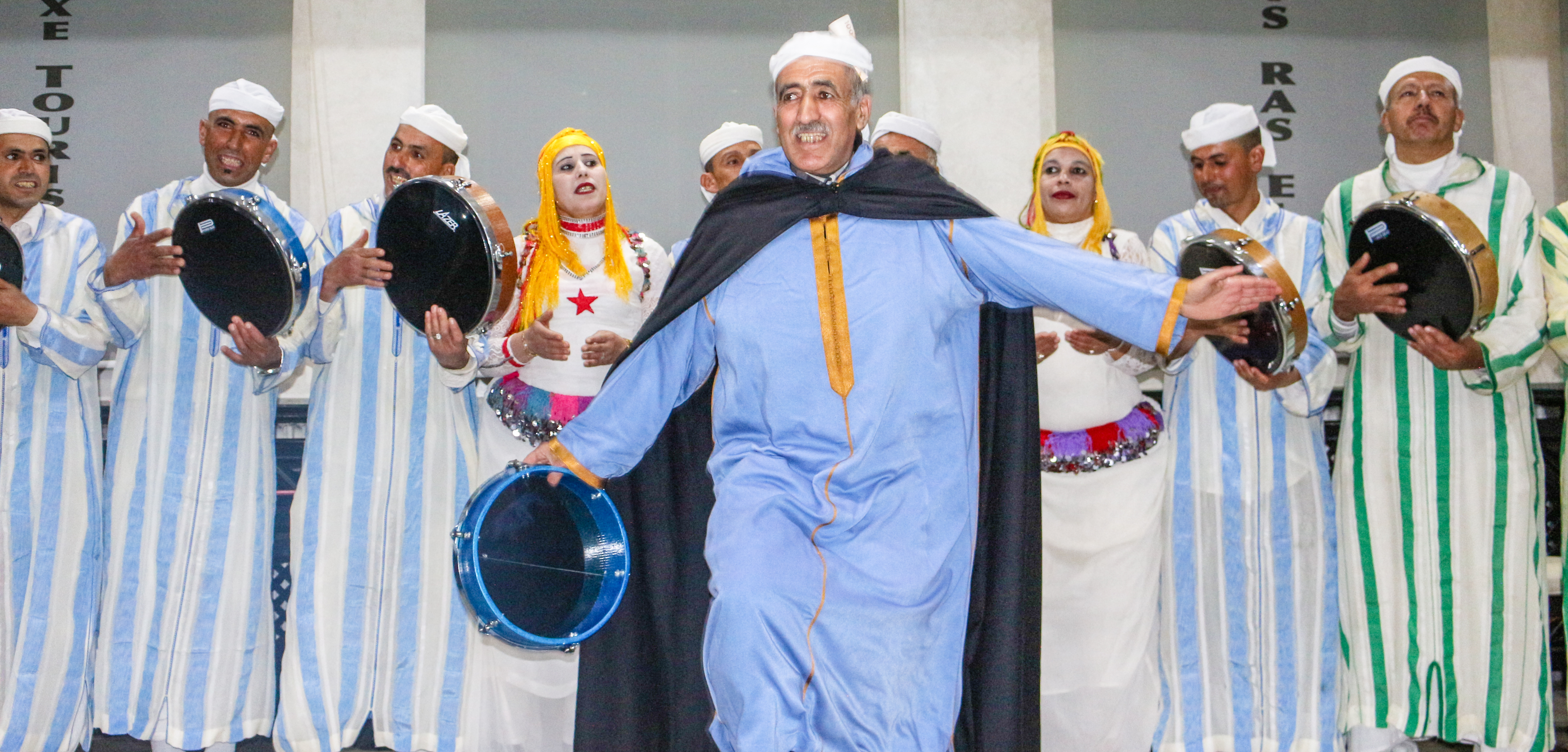
Ahidous group from Ifrane

Cultural life in Ifrane is characterized by an interplay between the Amazigh heritage of the Middle Atlas and contemporary arts and music, benefiting from the city's tourist location and its hosting of Al Akhawayn University. The Ahidous tradition, which combines singing, poetry, collective dancing, and traditional rhythms, is one of the most prominent manifestations of the cultural heritage associated with the city and its surroundings. It features in a number of artistic events hosted by Ifrane, particularly the "Ahidous Symphony", which brings together groups from different parts of the Middle Atlas in collective performances that combine traditional forms with contemporary artistic presentation. Alongside traditional arts, the city's artistic life includes modern Moroccan and Amazigh music, rap, visual arts, and cultural performances, reflecting the diversity of forms of artistic expression in the city.

The Ifrane International Festival is the city's most prominent modern cultural and artistic event. It combines musical concerts, folk arts, cultural, sporting, and environmental activities, and hosts Moroccan and international artists, with particular emphasis on the Amazigh heritage of the Middle Atlas. In several editions, its programming has been associated with environmental and sustainable development themes, drawing on the city's natural setting and Ifrane National Park. Ifrane also hosts film and theatre events with national and international reach. Among the most notable is the "Universal Cedar Short Film Festival", held in Ifrane and Azrou and regarded as one of the oldest short film festivals in Morocco. It features competitions for fiction and documentary films, alongside workshops on screenwriting and directing, as well as film-related meetings and tributes. Theatre is likewise represented through the "Badaoui Theatre Festival", whose programme brings together theatrical performances, folk arts, intellectual discussions, and activities related to theatrical heritage, while highlighting the role of art and culture in development. The city also hosts visual arts events, including the "Caravane de l'Art", which brings together exhibitions, artistic meetings, and cultural activities and facilitates exchange among artists from different backgrounds. The cultural scene in Ifrane is thus based on interaction between the Amazigh heritage of the Middle Atlas, contemporary music and arts, theatre, cinema, and visual arts, alongside cultural activity associated with the university and festivals, making culture one of the components of the city's tourist image and a means of promoting its heritage and strengthening artistic and cultural exchange.

== Economy ==
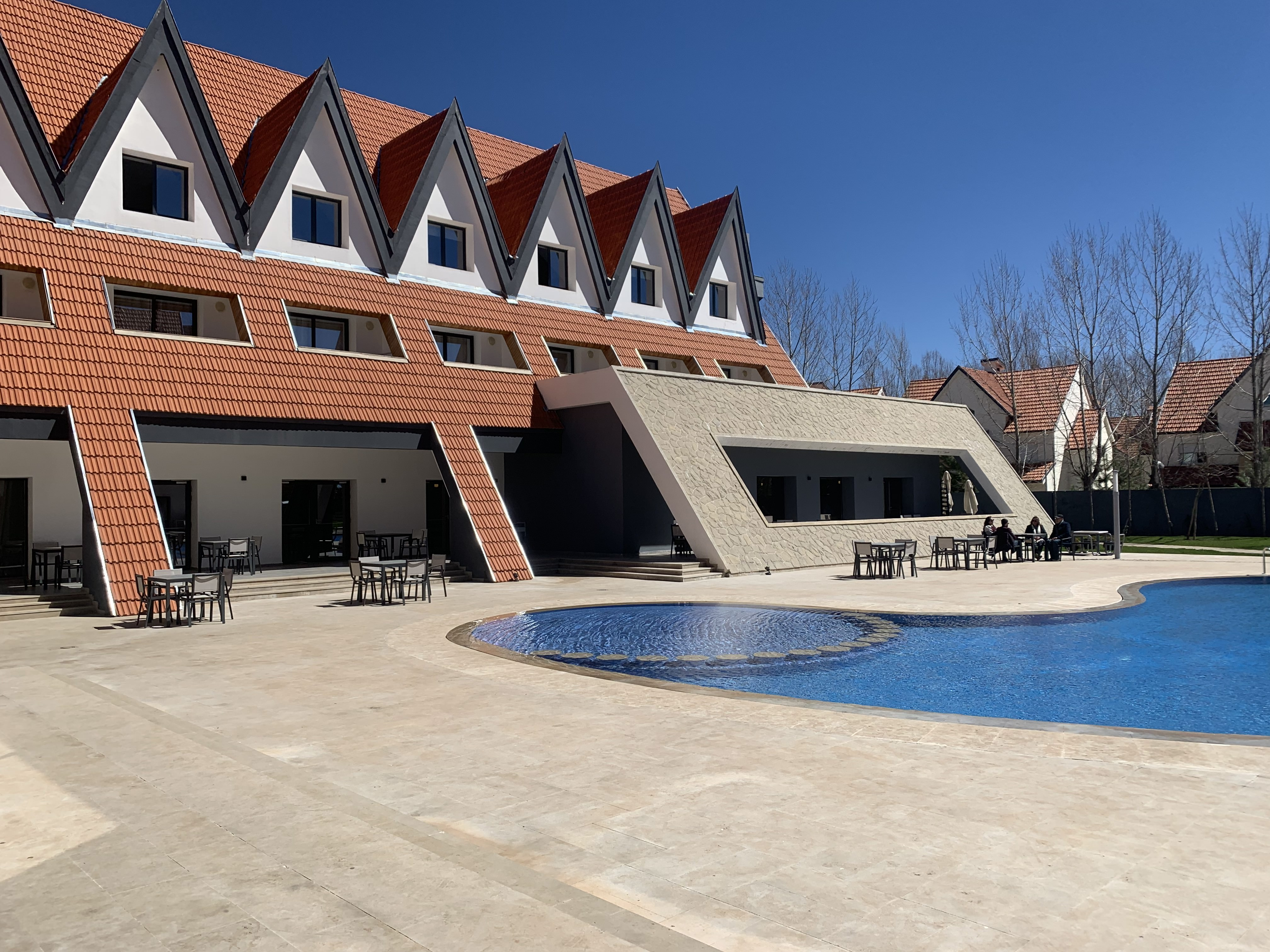
Zephyr Hotel in Ifrane

The economy of Ifrane is primarily based on services, tourism, trade, and activities associated with education and administration, amid a limited industrial base within the city. Ifrane's location in the heart of the Middle Atlas, its elevation, and its natural assets have contributed to the development of a tourism-based economy relying on accommodation and second homes, social activities organized by major institutions and companies, and mountain and sports tourism. Its designation as the administrative centre of Ifrane Province and its hosting of Al Akhawayn University have also strengthened its administrative, educational, and service functions. The tourist appeal of the city and its surroundings is based on a range of natural and recreational resources, including Ifrane National Park, lakes, springs, waterfalls, and forested areas, as well as the Michlifen ski resort. This allows for a diverse range of tourism products, including winter, nature, ecotourism, and sports tourism. Economic activity associated with tourism extends beyond accommodation to restaurants, cafés, retail, transport, recreational services, sporting activities, and handicrafts. The city also benefits from demand generated by the presence of Al Akhawayn University, administrative institutions, public facilities, seasonal residents, and second-home owners.

The High Commission for Planning's Economic Establishments Mapping for 2023–2024 illustrates the significant weight of trade and services in the city's economic fabric. The commune of Ifrane recorded 543 economic establishments, including 412 profit-oriented establishments employing 1,490 people, compared with 117 public-service establishments and 14 independent non-profit establishments, while the number of industrial establishments stood at 13 and construction establishments at only 6. Among the profit-oriented establishments, trade accounted for 208 establishments and services for 185, reflecting the dominance of service and commercial activities in the urban economy compared with the limited presence of industry and construction. The local economic fabric is also characterized by the small size of most of its units. Data from the High Commission for Planning indicate that the majority of profit-oriented establishments employ only a limited number of workers, highlighting the importance of small businesses and commercial and service units in generating economic activity and employment within the city. The local economy also benefits from the social and solidarity economy, particularly cooperatives associated with handicrafts, forestry, agricultural products, and aromatic and medicinal plants. These activities are more closely connected to the wider provincial area of Ifrane and its rural surroundings.

The labour market in Ifrane is characterized by the importance of paid employment, alongside a clear presence of both the public and private sectors, while high unemployment remains one of the city's principal social and economic challenges. According to data from the 2024 General Population and Housing Census, the economic activity rate among the population aged 15 and over in the commune of Ifrane was 49.6%, while the unemployment rate was 19.9%, with differences between the sexes: 17.9% among men and 24.7% among women. The same data show the predominance of paid employment among workers' employment statuses, with employees accounting for 77.3%, compared with 12.6% for self-employed workers and 2.7% for employers. This reflects the strong connection of a large part of the local labour market to institutions and organized sectors, particularly services, administration, education, trade, and tourism. The 2023–2024 Economic Establishments Mapping also reveals the limited number of large establishments in the city, with only four establishments employing 50 or more people, compared with the predominance of very small establishments within the local economic fabric. The public sector performs an important economic function because Ifrane is the provincial capital and hosts administrative departments and public institutions, while the private sector is the main source of commercial, service, tourism, and professional activities, alongside the economic role of Al Akhawayn University and private educational institutions.

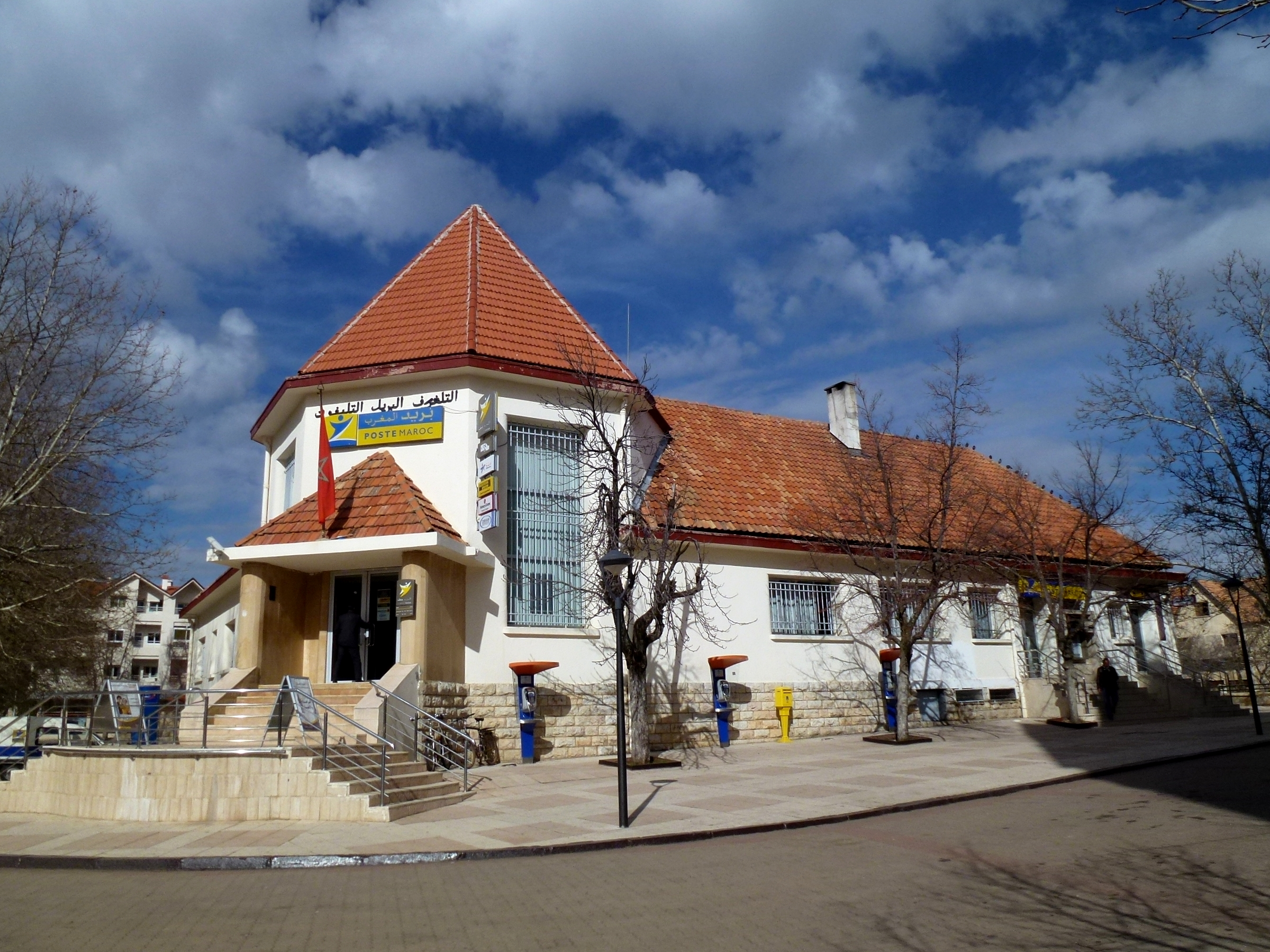
Barid Al-Maghrib branch office in Ifrane

Financial and banking activity is linked to the bank branches and financial services available within the city, which provide deposit, withdrawal, transfer, payment, and financing services for economic activities, serving households, businesses, and commercial and tourism activities. Ifrane hosts branches and agencies of several banking institutions and financial-service networks operating at the national level, alongside money-transfer services, Barid Al-Maghrib, microcredit and microfinance agencies, as well as agencies and service centres of Moroccan telecommunications companies, such as Maroc Telecom, providing residents and businesses with a wide range of financial, digital, and telecommunications services. As the capital and administrative and economic centre of Ifrane Province, the city also performs a financial function extending beyond its urban population to residents of the surrounding communes, villages, and rural centres, who travel to the city to conduct banking and financial transactions, open accounts, withdraw and transfer money, pay bills, and access postal, telecommunications, and credit services, in addition to purchasing various goods and services. This strengthens Ifrane's position as a service centre for its wider provincial hinterland and increases the circulation of money and commercial exchange within the city. Among the major institutions operating in this field are national banking institutions such as Banque Populaire, Attijariwafa Bank, Bank of Africa, and Crédit Agricole du Maroc, alongside Barid Al-Maghrib and money-transfer networks, as well as microfinance and medium-sized financing institutions and telecommunications company agencies. This reflects the diversity of financial, commercial, and administrative services provided by the city to its residents and those of its surrounding rural areas.

== "Garden City" ==
Sculpture of a lion in a park of the city

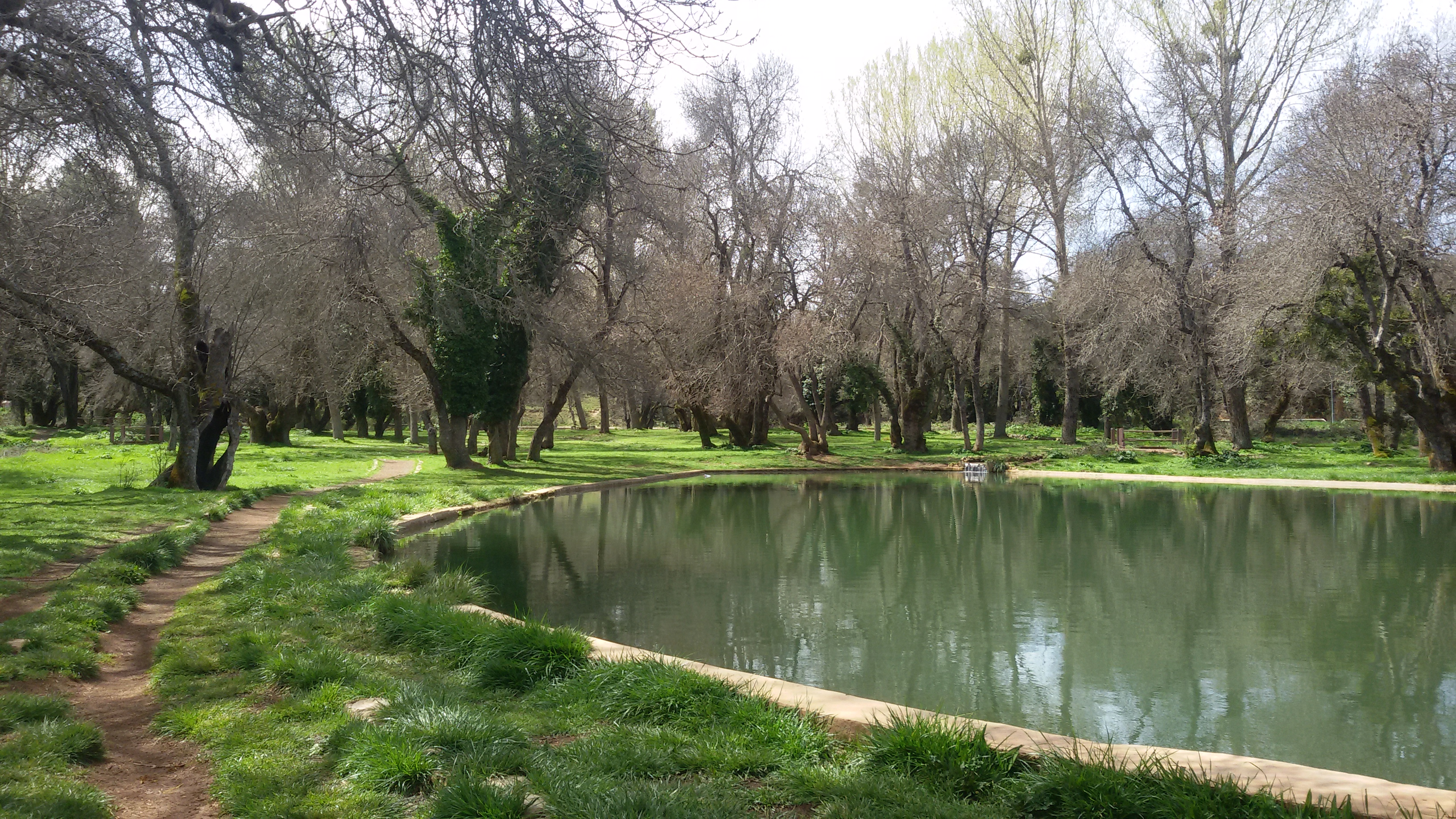
Ain Vittel Park

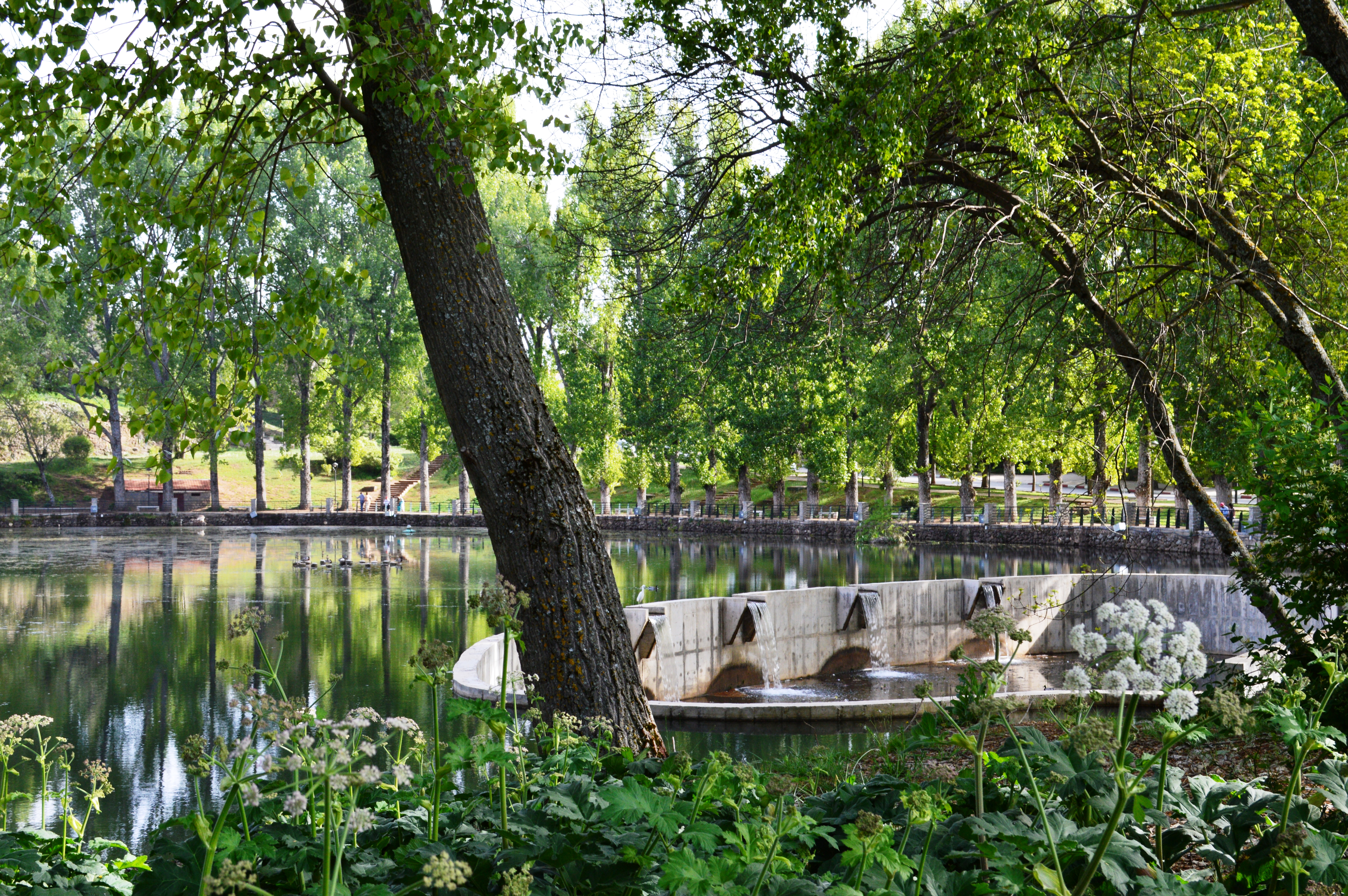
Lake near «Parc La Prairie»

Urban forest

Ifrane was planned according to the "garden city" model of urban design, fashionable in Western Europe between the two world wars. The concept of the garden city was developed in Britain as a model of social reform to solve the problems of 19th century industrial cities. By the 1920s however it had lost its social purpose to become an urban design type. Garden cities required low density housing consisting of fully detached or semi-detached single family homes surrounded by gardens.

In order to break with industrial-era grid plans, garden cities were always laid out with curving tree-lined streets. In fact, most garden cities were affluent suburbs, not true cities in their own right. They catered to the tastes of the upper middle classes who could afford to own a private automobile and property in the suburbs. They gave the illusion of county life, with village-type architecture, curvy streets and many trees, to people who in reality worked in big cities. Ifrane's initial garden city plan was designed in 1928 in Rabat by the Services Techniques of the Bureau de Contrôle des Municipalités, a division of the Direction des Affairs Politiques.

The 1928 plan – for the neighborhood known as Hay Riad today – had typical garden city features: curvy streets named for flora (Rue des lilas, Rue des tilleuls, etc.), and chalet-style houses. Houses could occupy only 40% of plots; the rest had to be planted as a garden. Moreover, large parts of the center of the town consisted of public gardens. Some of the original architecture can still be seen, especially in the neighborhood around the town hall and the Perce Neige Hotel. The summer homes built by the colons were designed by many of the same architects who built the European parts of Casablanca and Rabat. Whereas the European architecture in these big cities was innovative and intentionally modern, Ifrane's houses were built in traditional European styles and resembled those in the suburbs of contemporaneous French cities.

Ifrane's first public buildings were a post office and a Roman Catholic church. The church, consecrated in 1939, was designed by Paul Tournon (1881–1964), a recipient of the prestigious Prix de Rome who had also designed the Sacré Cœur Church in Casablanca. The resort function of the new town was consolidated with the building of a number of hotels. Ifrane's first flagship hotel was the Balima, which was demolished in the 1980s. The other main hotel was the Grand Hôtel, which has recently been refurbished. A royal palace was also built for the prior sultan Mohammed V.

Ifrane is thus an "imperial" city in that it houses a palace and benefits from royal patronage. One final institution of Ifrane's early years worthy of mention is the penitentiary which no longer exists, and the site, across from the Police Academy and the new police Commissariat, has been redeveloped as a summer camp for the Ministry of Justice. There were conflicting opinions and references about who carved the lion. According to the residents, a prisoner from World War I named Jean-Henri Moreau was the one who carved it, a Frenchman born in Bordeaux. The same references add that the process of carving the Lion of Ifrane began in March of the year 1930 and ended at the end of April of the same year, on a rock measuring seven meters in length, one meter and a half in width, and two meters in height.

The garden city hill station high in the Middle Atlas was always going to be an illusion of suburban middle-class France. Provisions were made for the housing and infrastructure of colonial home-owners, but not for the Moroccan maids, gardeners or guards who worked for them. Finding no housing in the official allotments, these people had to build their own houses some distance away, across a ravine north of the town. As elsewhere in Morocco at the time, a shanty town thus grew up next to the colonial town. This is the origin of Timdiqîn (officially called Hay Atlas).

== Climate ==
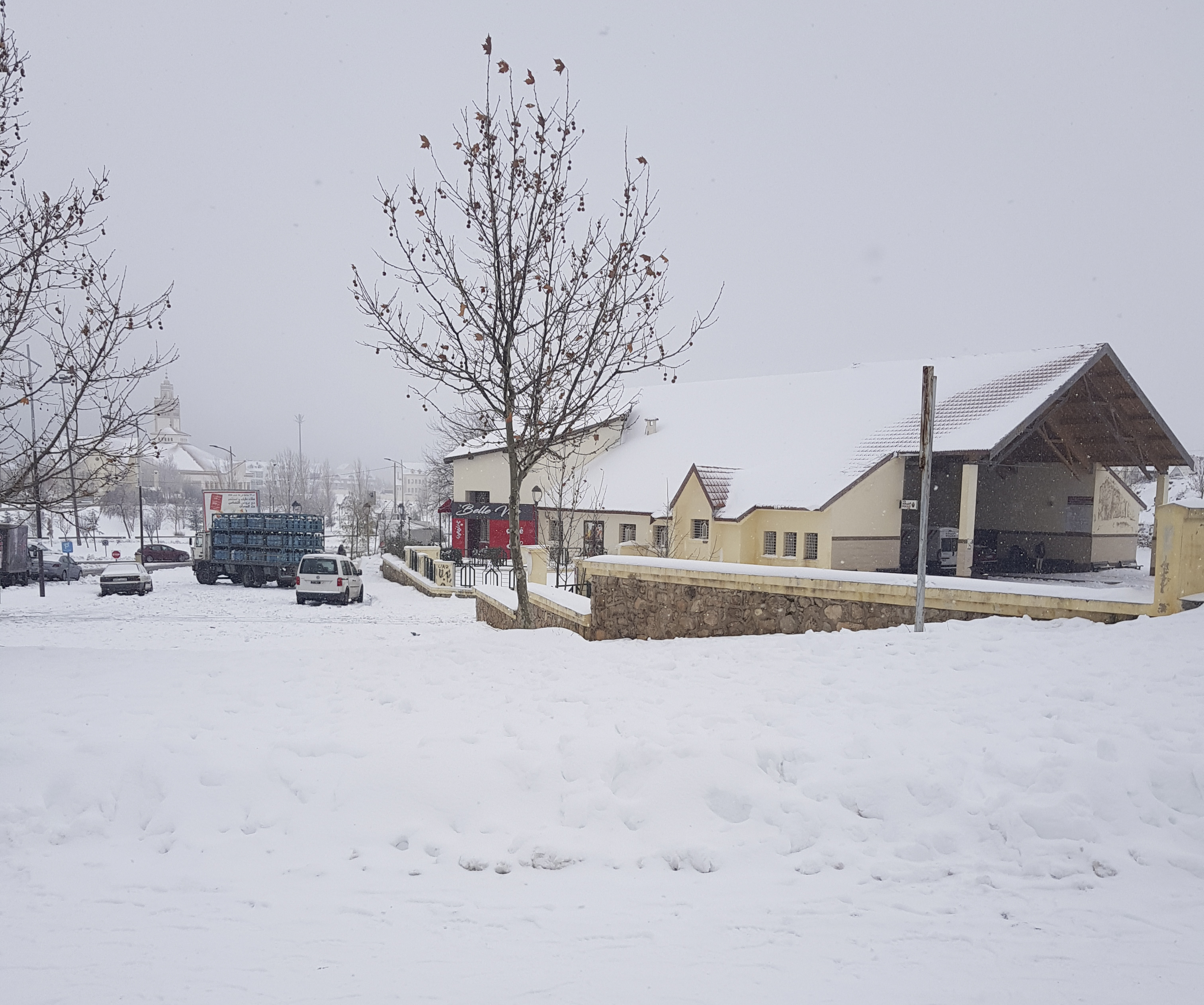
Ifrane in winter

Located in the Middle Atlas Mountains, Ifrane has a continental-influenced hot-summer Mediterranean climate (Csa) with short, somewhat dry, warm summers and long, cool, damp winters. The nights can be severely cold in winter.

Because of its elevation, the town experiences snow during the winter months and a cooler climate during the summer compared to nearby regions at a lower altitude.

Owing to the city's elevation and proximity to the north Atlantic Ocean, rainfall is very heavy whenever frontal systems affect the region. Precipitation patterns follow the classic Mediterranean range, from October to April. The city also receives high snowfall starting as early as October and lasting well into spring season. The annual average temperature is approximately 12 °C (54 °F).

Ifrane holds the record for the lowest temperature ever observed in Africa and the Arab world: −23.9 °C (−11.0 °F) on February 11, 1935.

Climate data for Ifrane (1991–2020)
Month	Jan	Feb	Mar	Apr	May	Jun	Jul	Aug	Sep	Oct	Nov	Dec	Year
Record high °C (°F)	21.6 (70.9)	21.3 (70.3)	24.2 (75.6)	26.3 (79.3)	32.0 (89.6)	35.2 (95.4)	36.4 (97.5)	37.8 (100.0)	34.4 (93.9)	29.4 (84.9)	23.3 (73.9)	21.9 (71.4)	37.8 (100.0)
Mean daily maximum °C (°F)	9.4 (48.9)	10.6 (51.1)	13.1 (55.6)	15.4 (59.7)	19.6 (67.3)	25.2 (77.4)	30.3 (86.5)	30.3 (86.5)	24.6 (76.3)	19.3 (66.7)	13.0 (55.4)	10.6 (51.1)	18.4 (65.1)
Daily mean °C (°F)	4.2 (39.6)	5.2 (41.4)	7.6 (45.7)	9.8 (49.6)	13.6 (56.5)	18.3 (64.9)	22.8 (73.0)	22.8 (73.0)	18.1 (64.6)	13.6 (56.5)	7.9 (46.2)	5.5 (41.9)	12.5 (54.4)
Mean daily minimum °C (°F)	−1.0 (30.2)	−0.2 (31.6)	2.2 (36.0)	4.1 (39.4)	7.5 (45.5)	11.3 (52.3)	15.2 (59.4)	15.3 (59.5)	11.5 (52.7)	7.8 (46.0)	2.7 (36.9)	0.4 (32.7)	6.4 (43.5)
Record low °C (°F)	−14.4 (6.1)	−23.9 (−11.0)	−9.8 (14.4)	−5.6 (21.9)	−5.8 (21.6)	0.0 (32.0)	4.5 (40.1)	4.4 (39.9)	0.7 (33.3)	−3.8 (25.2)	−10.4 (13.3)	−14.0 (6.8)	−23.9 (−11.0)
Average precipitation mm (inches)	125.8 (4.95)	113.8 (4.48)	115.5 (4.55)	94.1 (3.70)	52.4 (2.06)	20.4 (0.80)	11.7 (0.46)	17.0 (0.67)	40.2 (1.58)	90.6 (3.57)	137.0 (5.39)	142.9 (5.63)	961.4 (37.84)
Average precipitation days (≥ 1 mm)	7.8	7.8	8.5	7.3	5.8	2.9	2.3	3.0	4.7	5.9	7.9	8.1	72.0
Mean monthly sunshine hours	180.6	169.1	214.4	211.2	263.1	302.3	340.8	317.0	258.1	227.3	175.8	172.8	2,832.5
Source: NOAA (sun 1961–1990), (August record high)

== Flora and fauna ==
Barbary macaque, Ifrane National Park

Ifrane's biodiversity is unique. Its fauna and flora contain rare yet mostly endangered species. Animals to be found in the vicinity include the threatened Barbary macaque. Among the local tree species are the native Atlas cedar, scrub oak and the introduced London plane.

=== Fauna ===
==== Mammalian species ====
- The Barbary macaque (Macaca sylvanus), an endangered monkey species that lives in its wild state in the forests of the Middle Atlas, including the forests surrounding Ifrane. Barbary macaques can be seen in the outskirts or the farther areas of the town of Ifrane when there is no more food in the woods, or simply because they have become familiar with humans.
- The golden jackal (Canis aureus), referred to as ‘ich’ab’ in Tamazight, the same term used for ‘wolf’
- The caracal (Caracal caracal), which is hard to spot, and survives thanks to its extreme discretion.
- The common genet (Genetta genetta)

==== Bird species ====
- The Atlas Coal Tit (Parus ater Atlas), an endemic passerine bird native to the Atlas mountains range.
- The African crimson-winged finch (Rhodopechys alienus)
- The white scavenger vulture (Neophron percnopterus)

Ifrane is also well known for its pisciculture (fish farming) stations. Ras el Ma forest has a trout-breeding station in which trout can be seen in their breeding basins. Moreover, Ifrane has a varied range of insects and amphibians.

=== Flora ===
Ifrane's plant and tree species include the following:

- The Atlas cedar (Cedrus Atlantica)
- The holm oak (Quercus rotundifolia)
- The Portuguese oak (Quercus faginea)
- The maritime pine (Pinus pinaster ssp. Hamiltoni var. maghrebiana)
- The Spanish juniper (Juniperus thurifera)
- The laurel-leaf cistus (Cistus laurifolius)
- Genista quadrifolia
- Artemisia mesatlantica

== Notable people ==
- Mostafa Smaili, middle-distance runner.
- Adil Jelloul, road bicycle racer.
