= Cèdre Gouraud Forest =

Woodland area in Morocco

Coordinates: 33°25′36″N 5°9′20″W

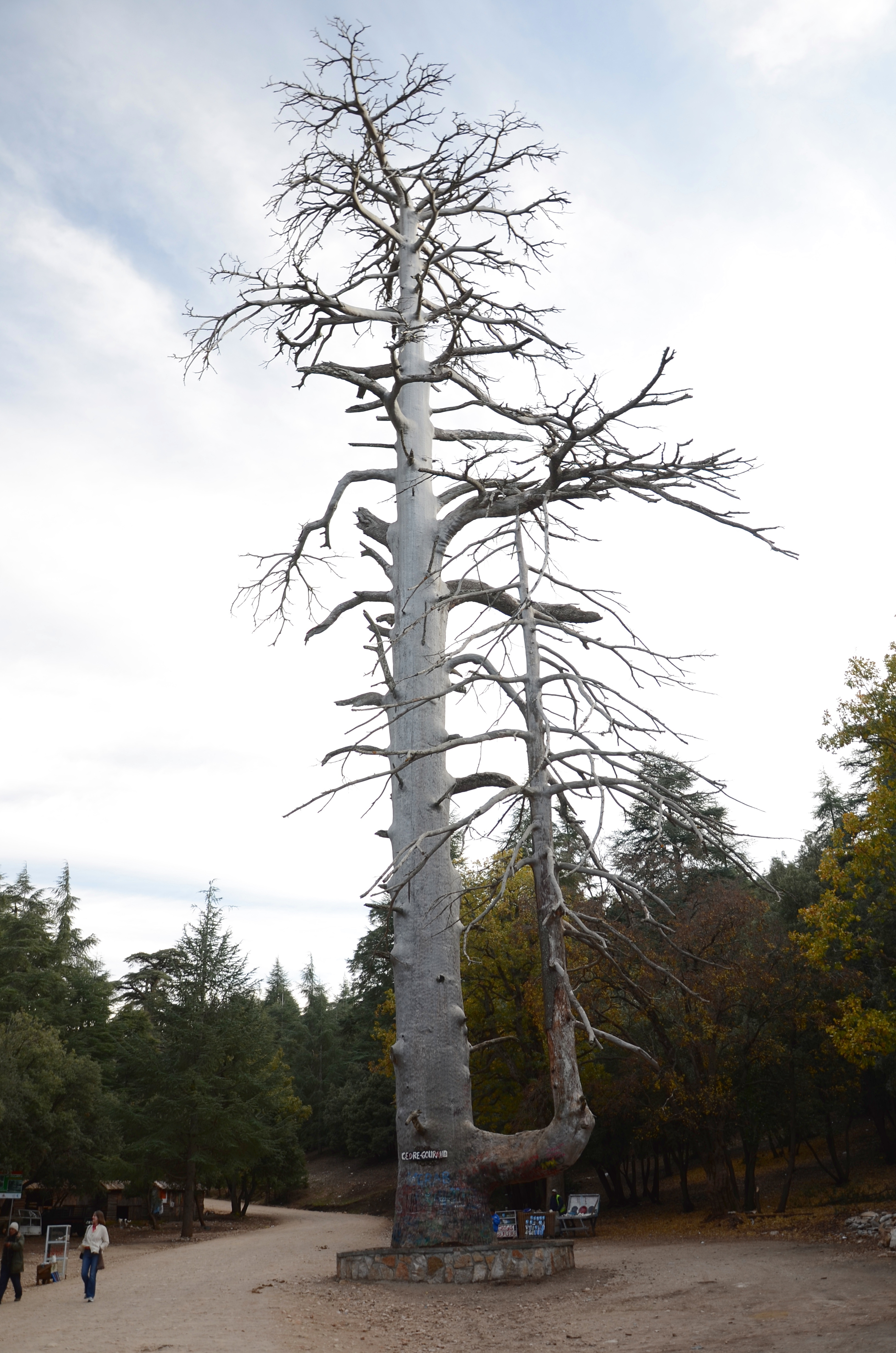

Cèdre Gouraud Forest is a woodland area in the Middle Atlas Mountain Range in Morocco. It was named for the French general Henri Gouraud. This forest is located on National Route 8 between Azrou and Ifrane. The forest is notable as a habitat for a sub-population of Barbary macaques, Macaca sylvanus.

== See also ==
- Atlas cedar
- Atlas Mountains
- Mediterranean woodlands and forests
