= Azrou =

Azrou ⴰⵥⵕⵓ (Standard Moroccan Tamazight) أزرو (Arabic)
- City
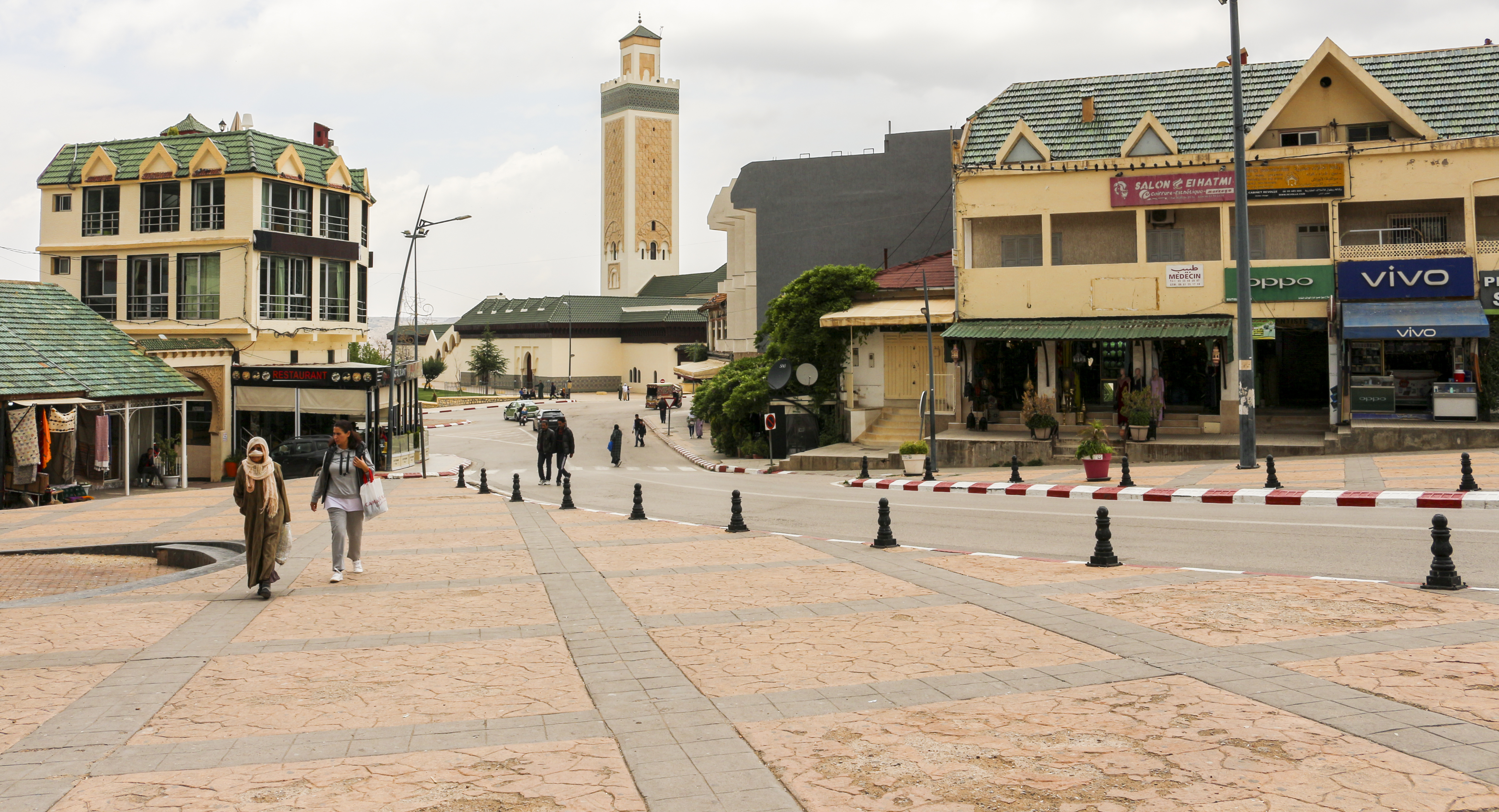
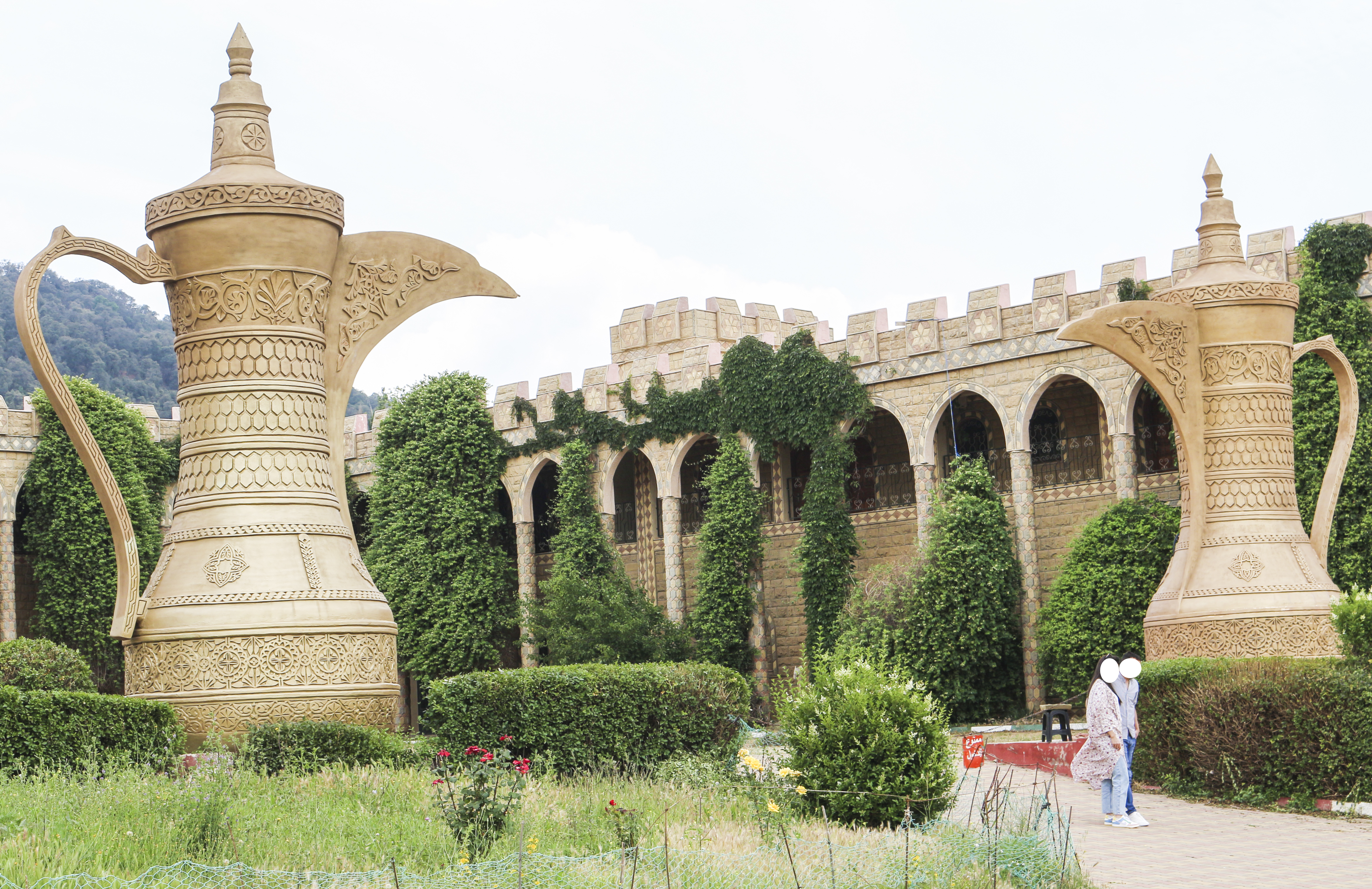
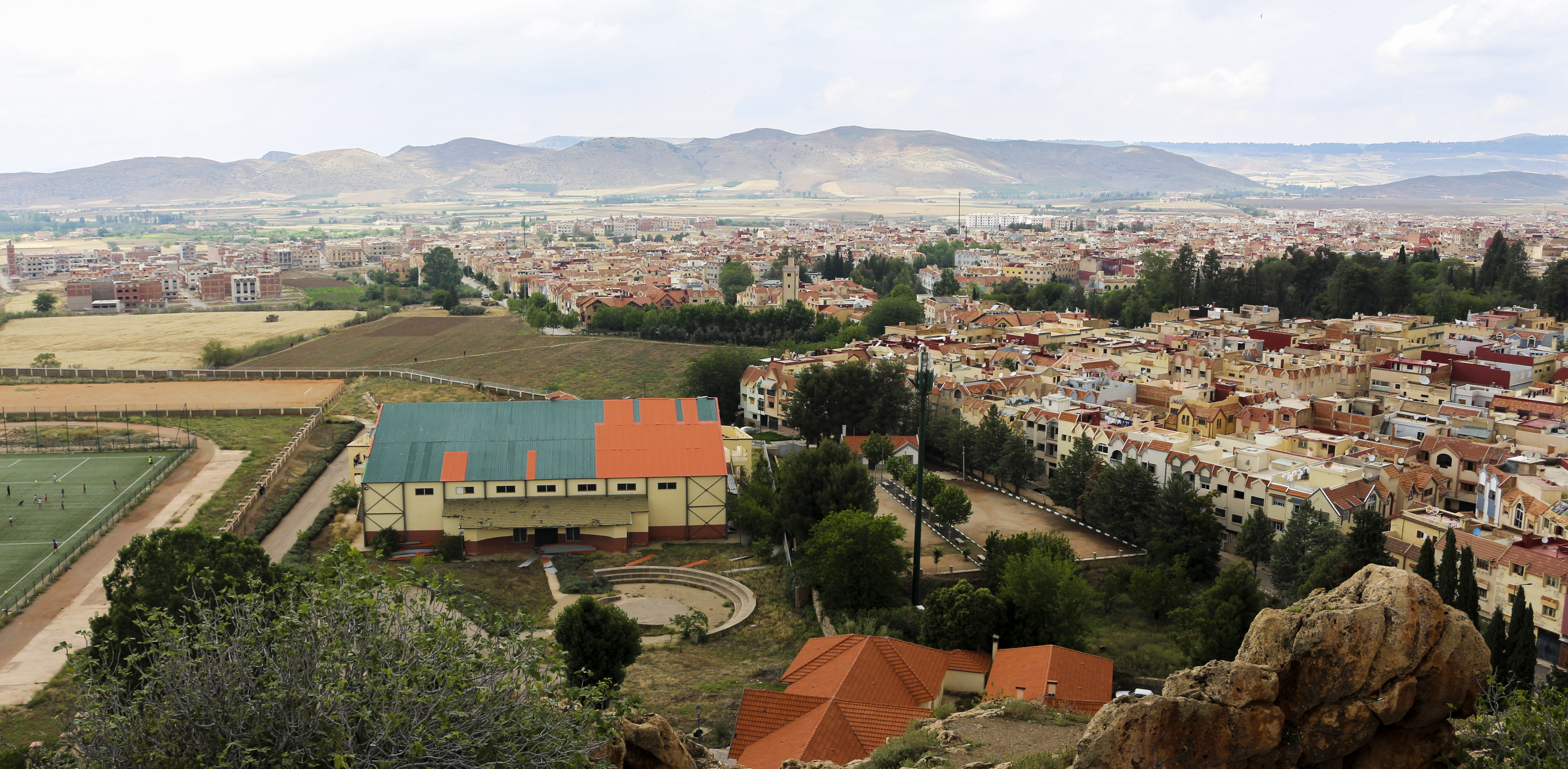
- Interactive map of Azrou
- Coordinates: 33°26′30″N 5°13′29″W
- Country: Morocco
- Region: Fez-Meknes
- Province: Ifrane

Population (2024)
  - Total: 57,657
- Time zone: UTC+0 (GMT)

Azrou (Note: Standard Moroccan Tamazight: ⴰⵥⵕⵓ Arabic: أزرو) is the largest city in Ifrane Province of the Fez-Meknes region of Morocco.

== Etymology ==
Azrou is a geomorphological name taken from the landform of a large rock outcrop (Aẓro, ⴰⵥⵔⵓ, means "rock" or "stone" in the Berber language Tamazight) in the centre of the city.

== Demographics ==
According to the 2024 Moroccan census, 86.1% of the population of Azrou speak Arabic as their mother tongue, whereas 13.8% natively speak Berber languages. in 2014 99.3% spoke Moroccan Arabic while 32.7% spoke Central Atlas Tamazight, other Berber languages were spoken in small numbers.

== History ==
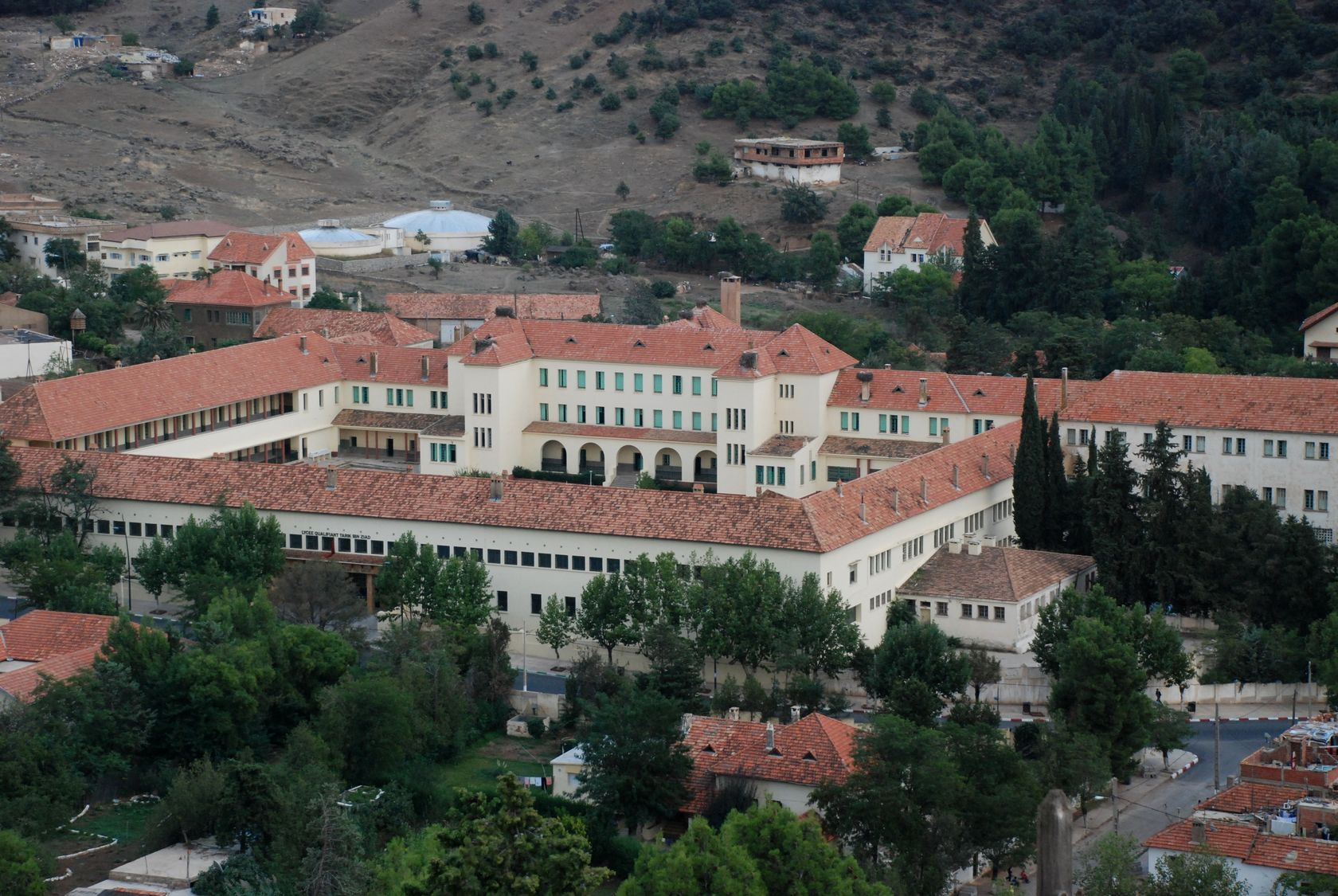
Lycée Tarik Ibn Ziad, formerly the Collège Berbère d'Azrou

The first record of Azrou city in history in a letter sent by Fernão Taveira to king Manuel I of Portugal.

Azrou is known for hosting the first high school in the Berber region: the Berber high school of Azrou (now the Tarik Ibn Ziad School). It was built by the French colonial authorities in order to train Moroccans for the colonial administration. It was one of the instruments for the implementation of a Berber Dhahir, which changed the justice system in areas where Amazigh languages were predominantly spoken, excluding these areas from Sharia and the authority of the Makhzen that applied to the rest of Morocco, and implementing a new legal system ostensibly in accordance with Amazigh laws and customs written in French.

The college became an educational institution in the reference area, forming part of the political and military elites from 1956 to 1973, after independence, the college was renamed Azrou Tarik Ibn Ziad High School.

In 1952, 20 Benedictine monks arrived to establish near the town the monastery of Toumliline which hosted interfaith dialogues between Christians, Jews and Muslims of different nationalities between 1955 and 1964. The monastery, which was closed in 1968 due to tensions within Morocco as well as global tensions, served as film location to the movie Of Gods and Men around 2010.

The town was long neglected by the Moroccan authorities since independence in 1956 to the benefit of the nearby town of Ifrane. Although it is the true capital of the Middle Atlas and a town that has given Morocco many leaders and intellectuals, the town still does not officially rank as provincial capital, although it is in practice.

The town has several hotels.

== Geography ==
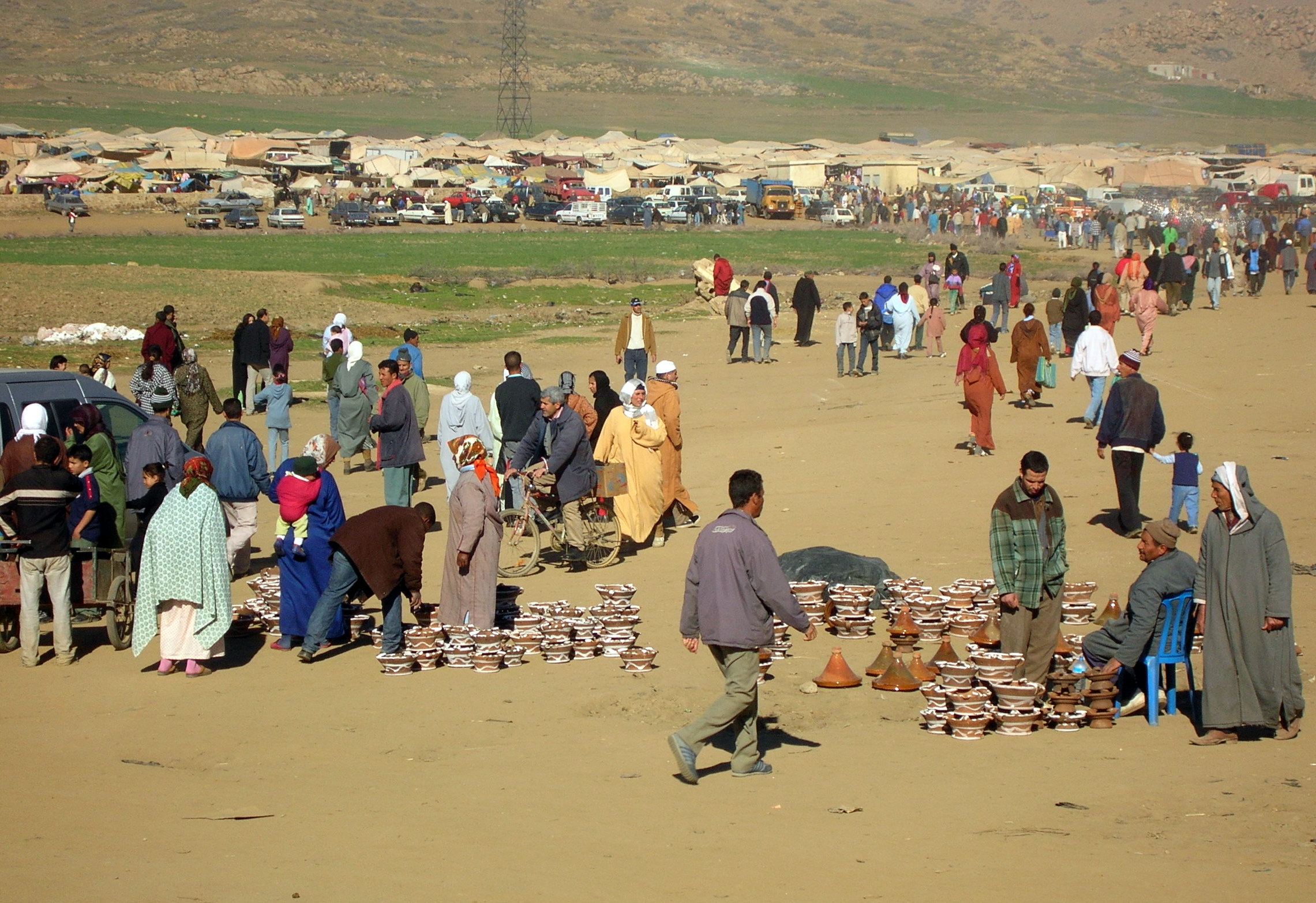
Azrou tuesday market

The market town of Azrou is located about 89 kilometres (55 mi) south of Fez.

Azrou is at an altitude of 1250 m and surrounded by mountains covered with evergreen holm oak and cedar.

The Cèdre Gouraud Forest is located to the south east, where one of the sub-populations of the Barbary macaque, Macaca sylvanus (called magots) lives and draws the attention of tourists. In addition to its rich biodiversity symbolized by the famous cedar forest there are the butterflies which are unique in the world. The surroundings of Azrou are a centre of attraction for the residents, hikers, and picnickers of the large neighbouring towns. These surroundings are also home to the 'Cedre Gouraud' or 'Grand Cedar', a famous tourist attraction. Moreover, the Azrou forest provides an excellent hiking and exercising environment and also holds several summer camps for children. Azrou urban construction is in the European style (red tile roofs).

The region is also known for its cherry trees, apple trees, fish farms, and the abandoned sanatorium in the surrounding metropolitan area of Ben Smim.

=== Climate ===
Generally, Azrou experiences a warmer climate than Ifrane, because the city is at a lower altitude. Under the Köppen system, Azrou features a hot-summer mediterranean climate (Csa), in spite of its cold winters, not cold enough to be classified as a continental mediterranean climate (Dsa). Thus, winters are moderately cold and snowy, but without substantial accumulation. Summers are hot and moderately dry, but noticeably wetter than in Ifrane.

Climate data for Azrou, Morocco
Month	Jan	Feb	Mar	Apr	May	Jun	Jul	Aug	Sep	Oct	Nov	Dec	Year
Record high °C (°F)	21.2 (70.2)	24.4 (75.9)	27.4 (81.3)	32.2 (90.0)	35.9 (96.6)	39.2 (102.6)	42.0 (107.6)	41.2 (106.2)	36.0 (96.8)	31.1 (88.0)	25.6 (78.1)	21.9 (71.4)	42.0 (107.6)
Mean daily maximum °C (°F)	10.3 (50.5)	11.6 (52.9)	13.8 (56.8)	17.7 (63.9)	21.4 (70.5)	26.8 (80.2)	32.0 (89.6)	31.4 (88.5)	26.3 (79.3)	21.6 (70.9)	13.5 (56.3)	10.7 (51.3)	19.8 (67.6)
Daily mean °C (°F)	4.4 (39.9)	5.6 (42.1)	8.3 (46.9)	11.6 (52.9)	14.6 (58.3)	19.7 (67.5)	23.3 (73.9)	22.8 (73.0)	19.4 (66.9)	15.1 (59.2)	8.4 (47.1)	4.9 (40.8)	13.2 (55.7)
Mean daily minimum °C (°F)	−1.5 (29.3)	−0.4 (31.3)	2.8 (37.0)	5.5 (41.9)	7.8 (46.0)	12.6 (54.7)	14.6 (58.3)	14.2 (57.6)	12.5 (54.5)	8.6 (47.5)	3.3 (37.9)	−0.9 (30.4)	6.6 (43.9)
Record low °C (°F)	−14.4 (6.1)	−16.5 (2.3)	−8.8 (16.2)	−4.6 (23.7)	−1.5 (29.3)	2.2 (36.0)	7.1 (44.8)	6.0 (42.8)	3.3 (37.9)	−1.1 (30.0)	−8.0 (17.6)	−14.1 (6.6)	−16.5 (2.3)
Average precipitation mm (inches)	156 (6.1)	133 (5.2)	111 (4.4)	92 (3.6)	54 (2.1)	40 (1.6)	24 (0.9)	36 (1.4)	53 (2.1)	75 (3.0)	121 (4.8)	172 (6.8)	1,067 (42)
Source: https://fr.climate-data.org/afrique/maroc/azrou/azrou-21511/

== Transport ==
Azrou is located at a strategic crossroads of the N13 and N8 roads towards the northern end of the Middle Atlas. The N13 road connects Azrou to Meknes in the north west and Midelt in the south east. The National Route N8 comes from Fez in the north east and continues to Khenifra and then Marrakesh in the south west.

== Gallery ==
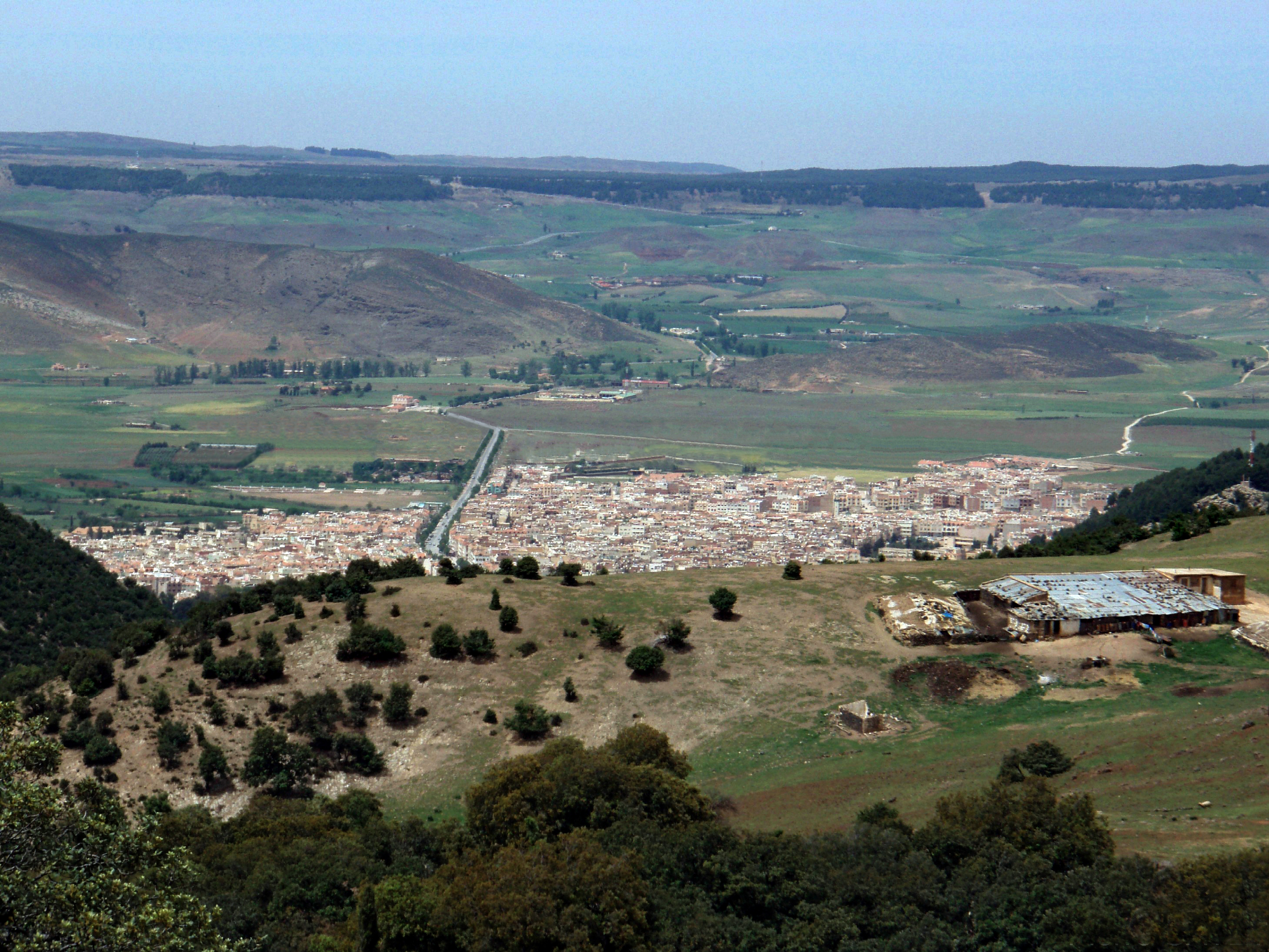
Azrou city

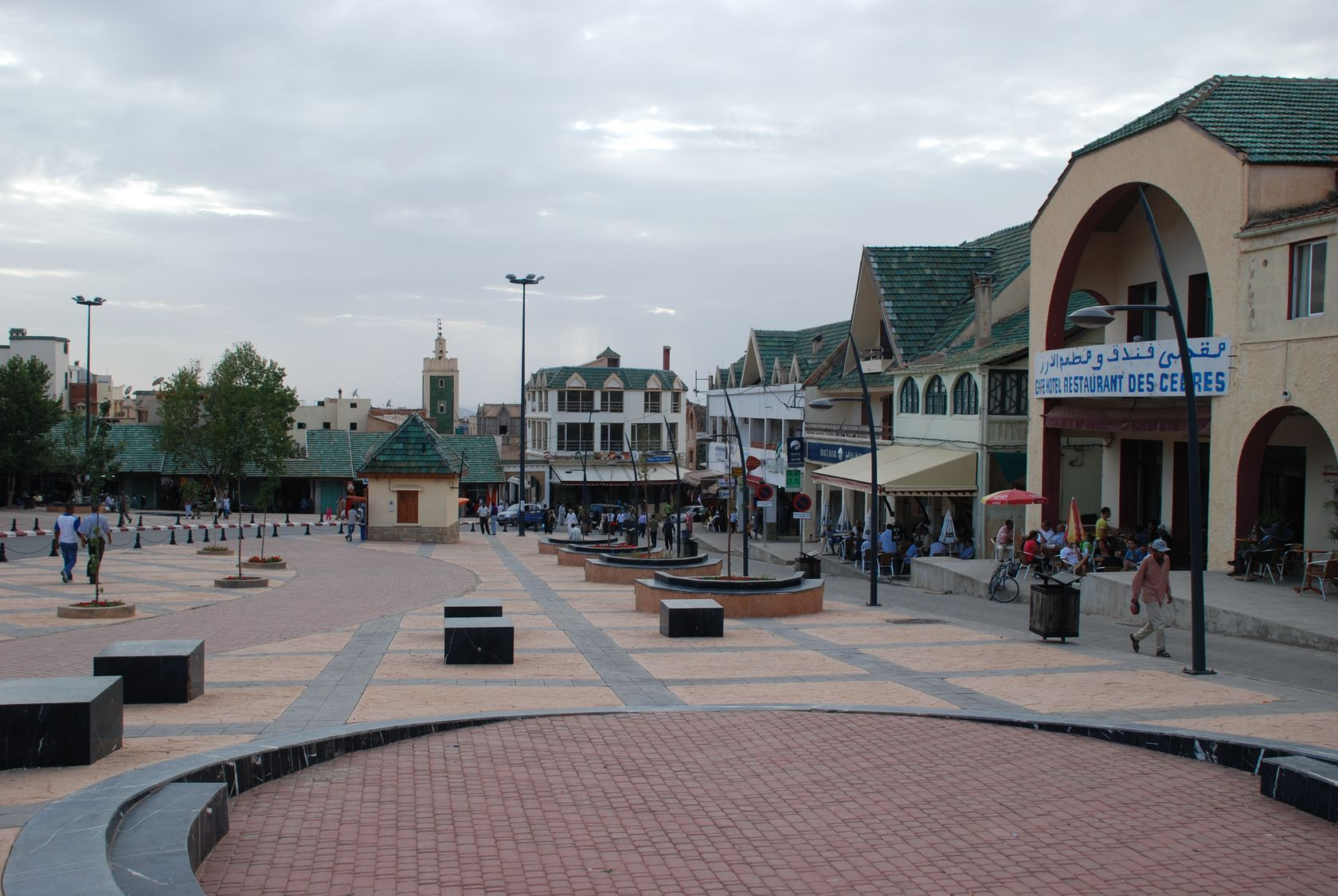
The Place Muhammed V

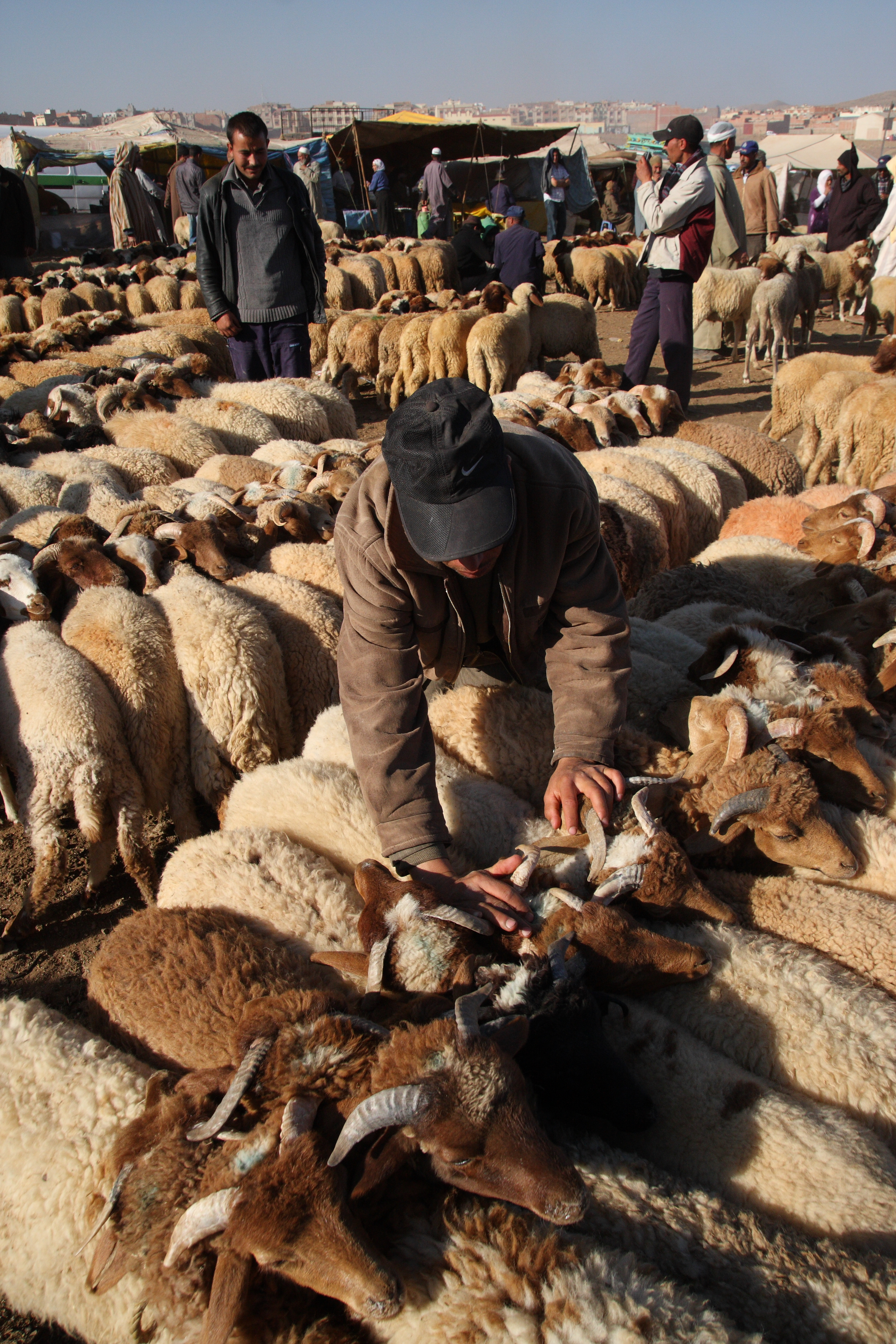
Sheep Market

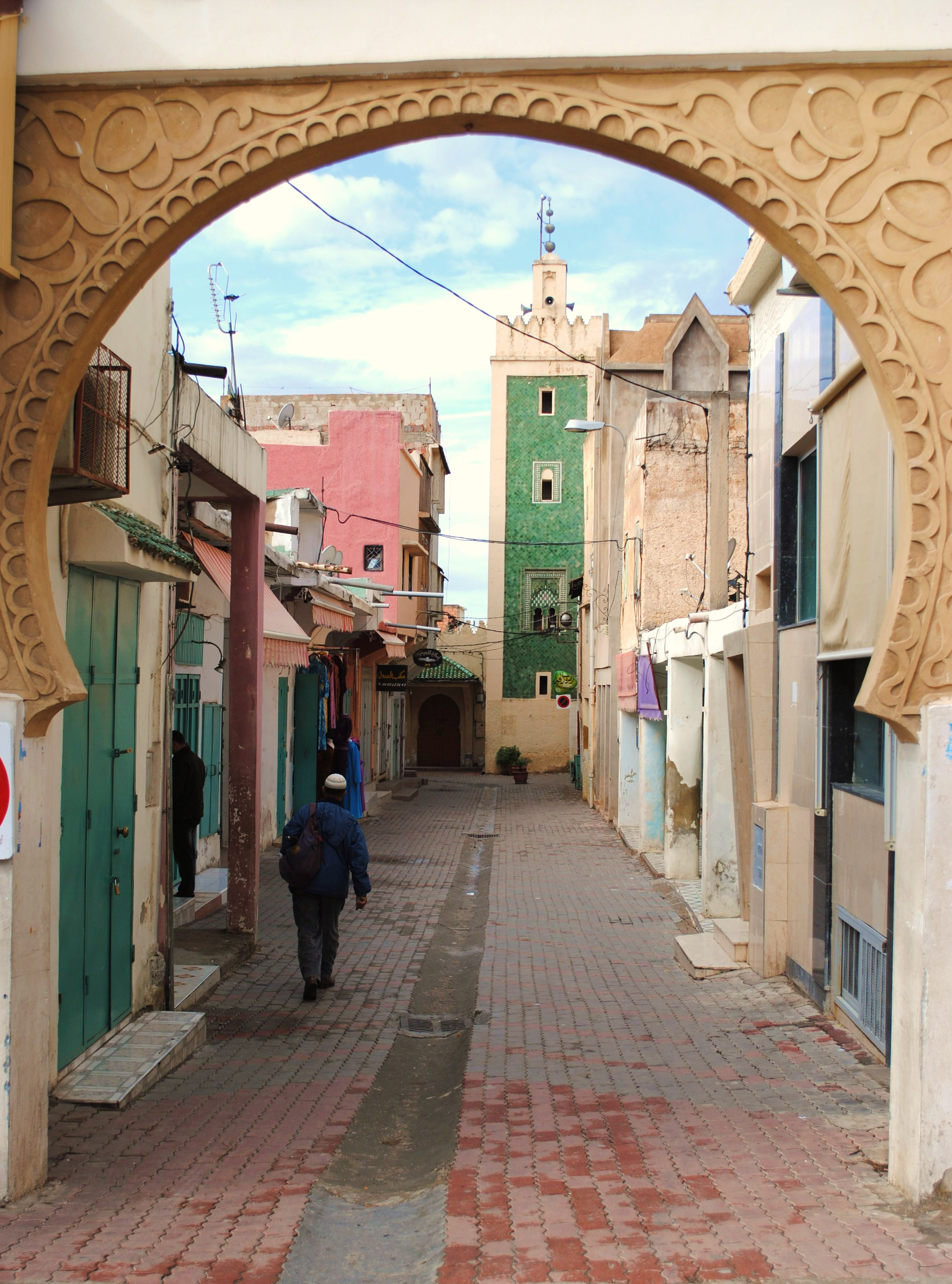
An Azrou street

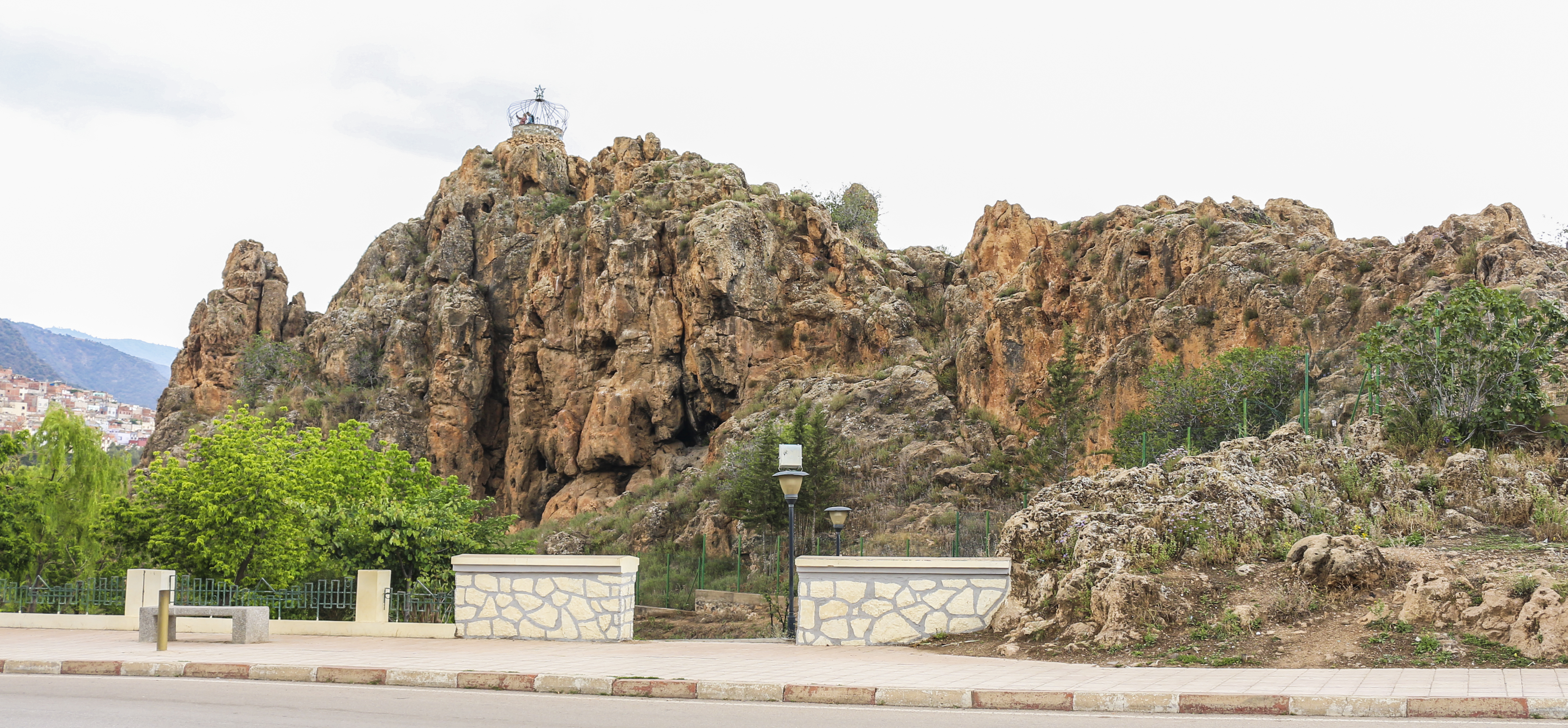
The Akchmir rock

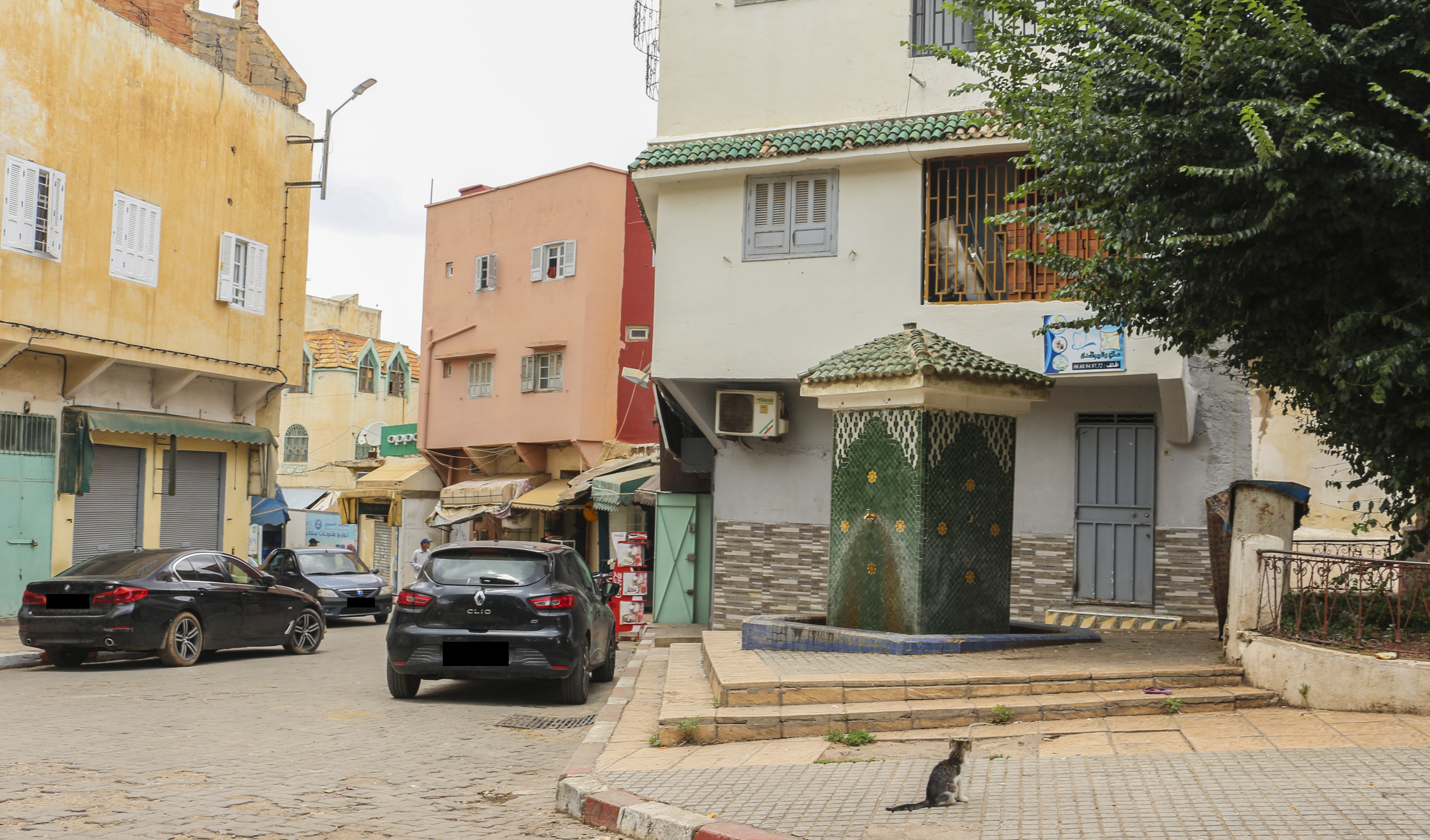
Azrou town

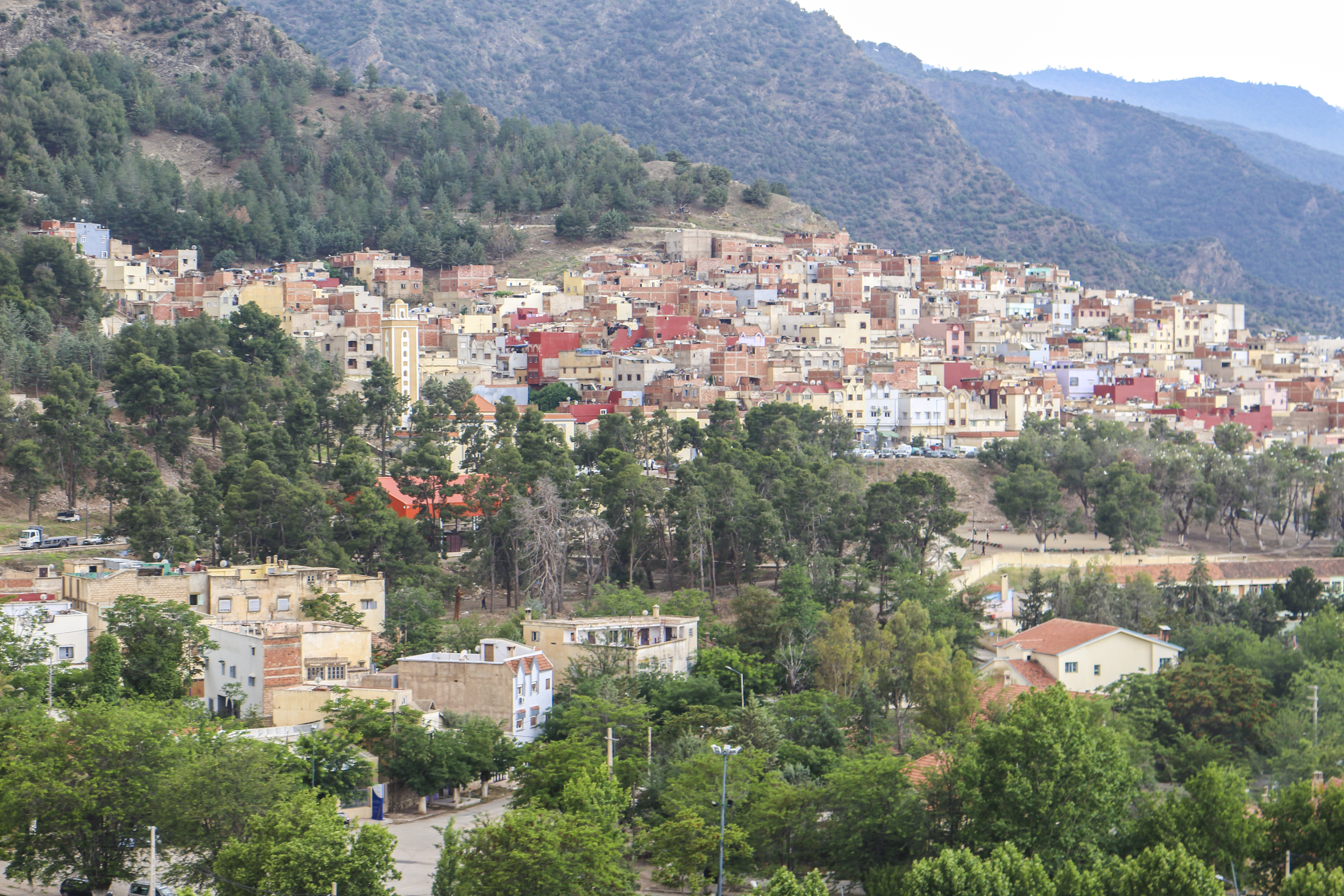
Neighborhood Tizi Moulay El Hassan in Azrou

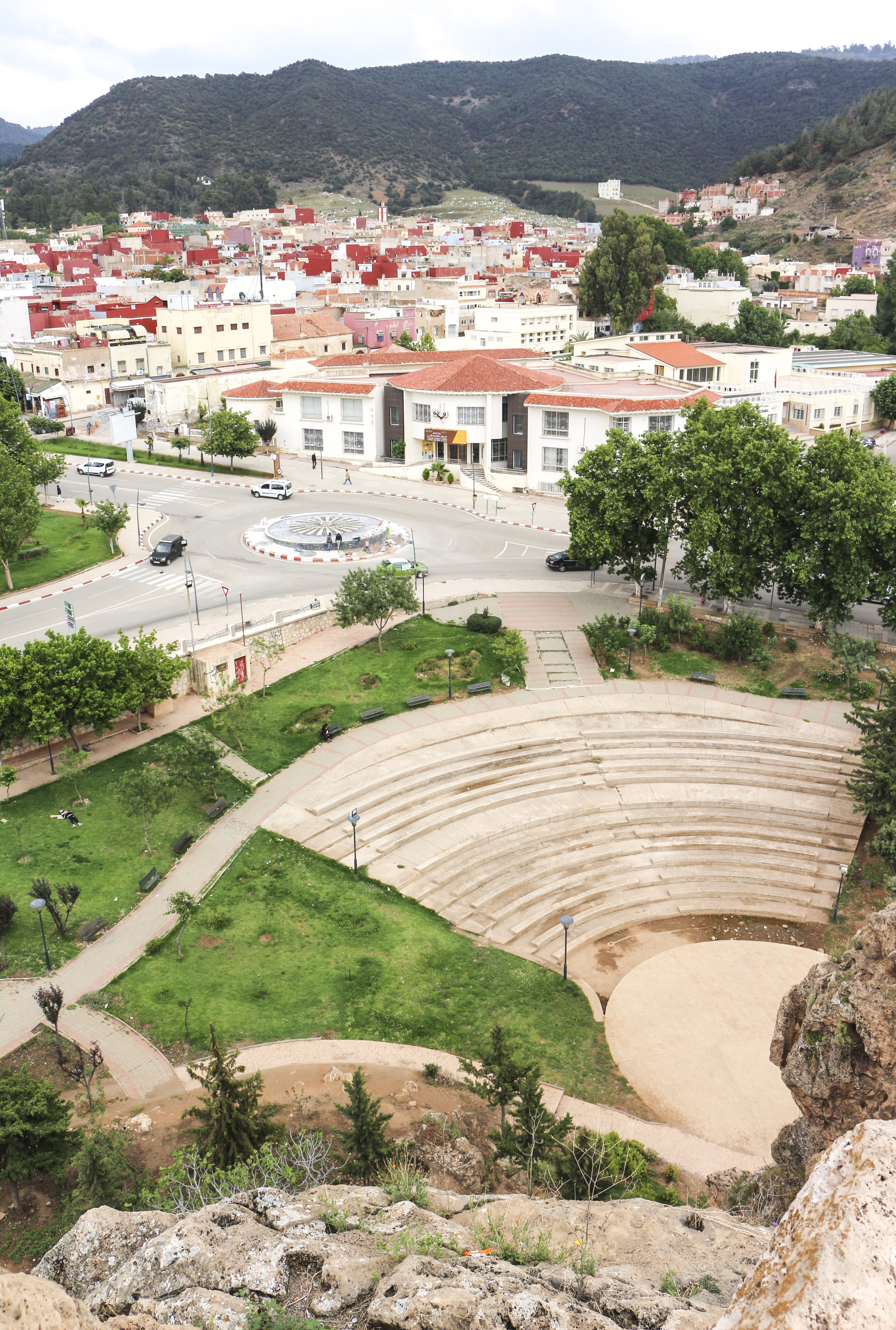
The Amazigh Museum of Azrou

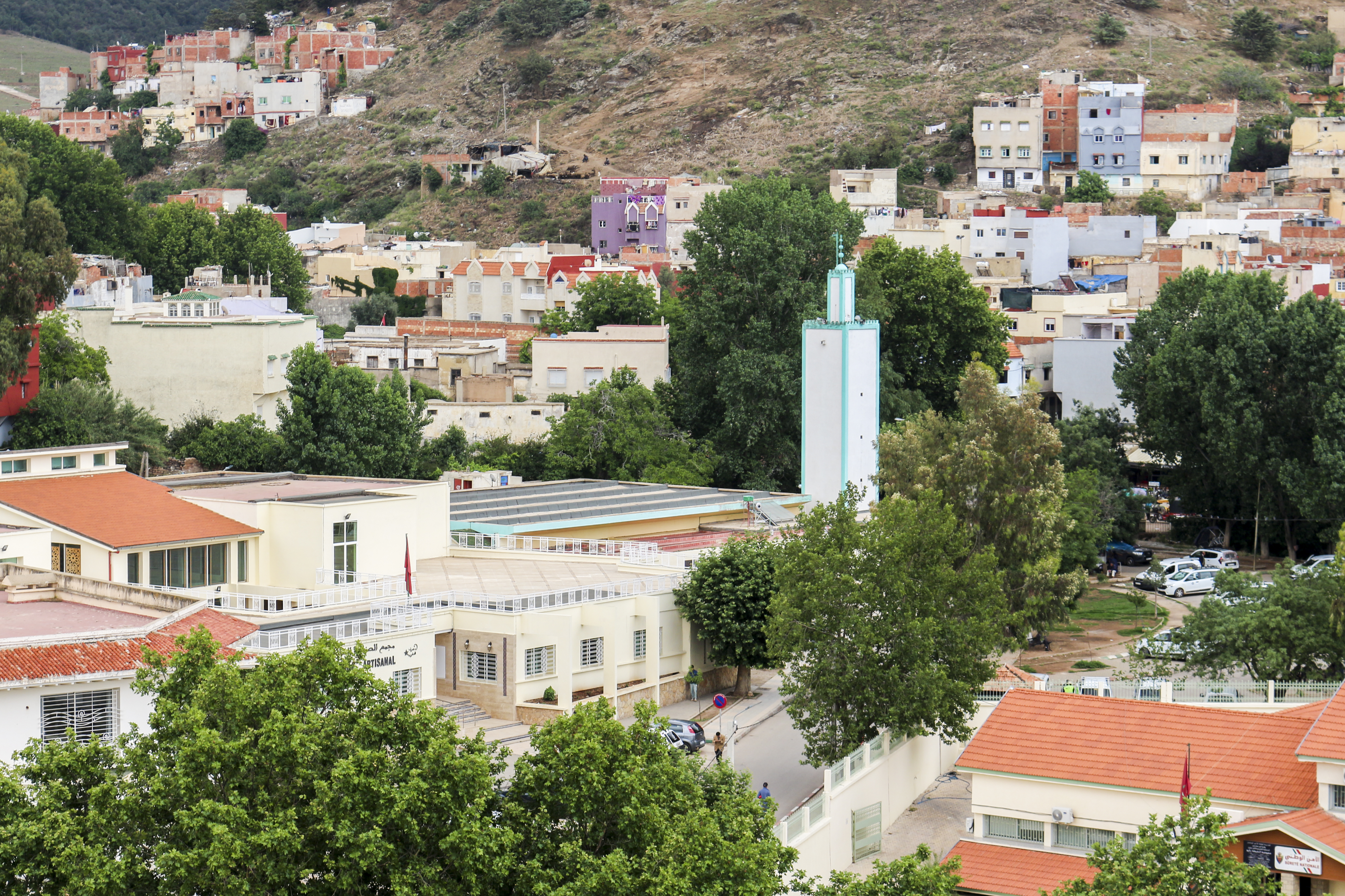
Hassan II Mosque Azrou

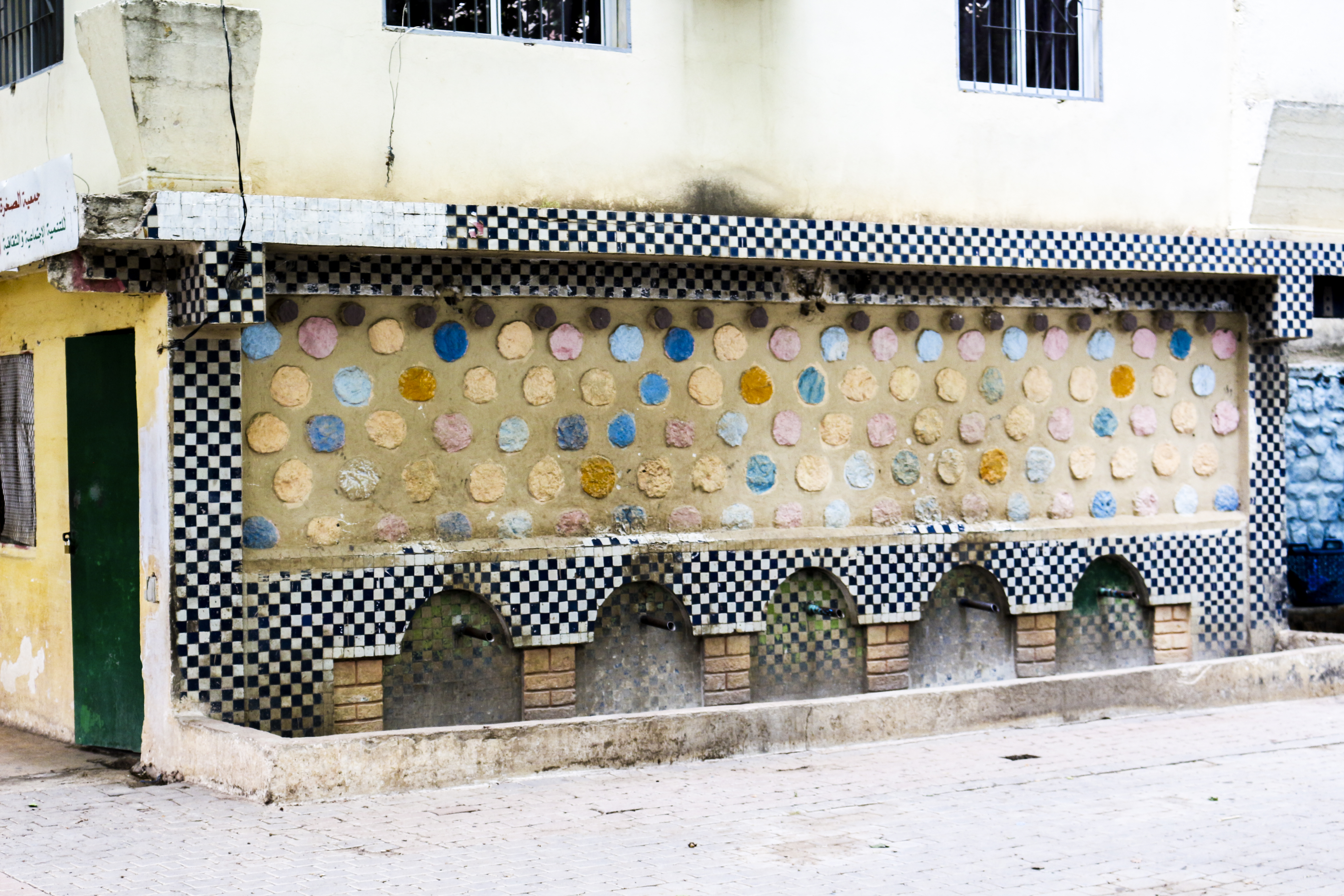
Esebbab fountain in Azrou city

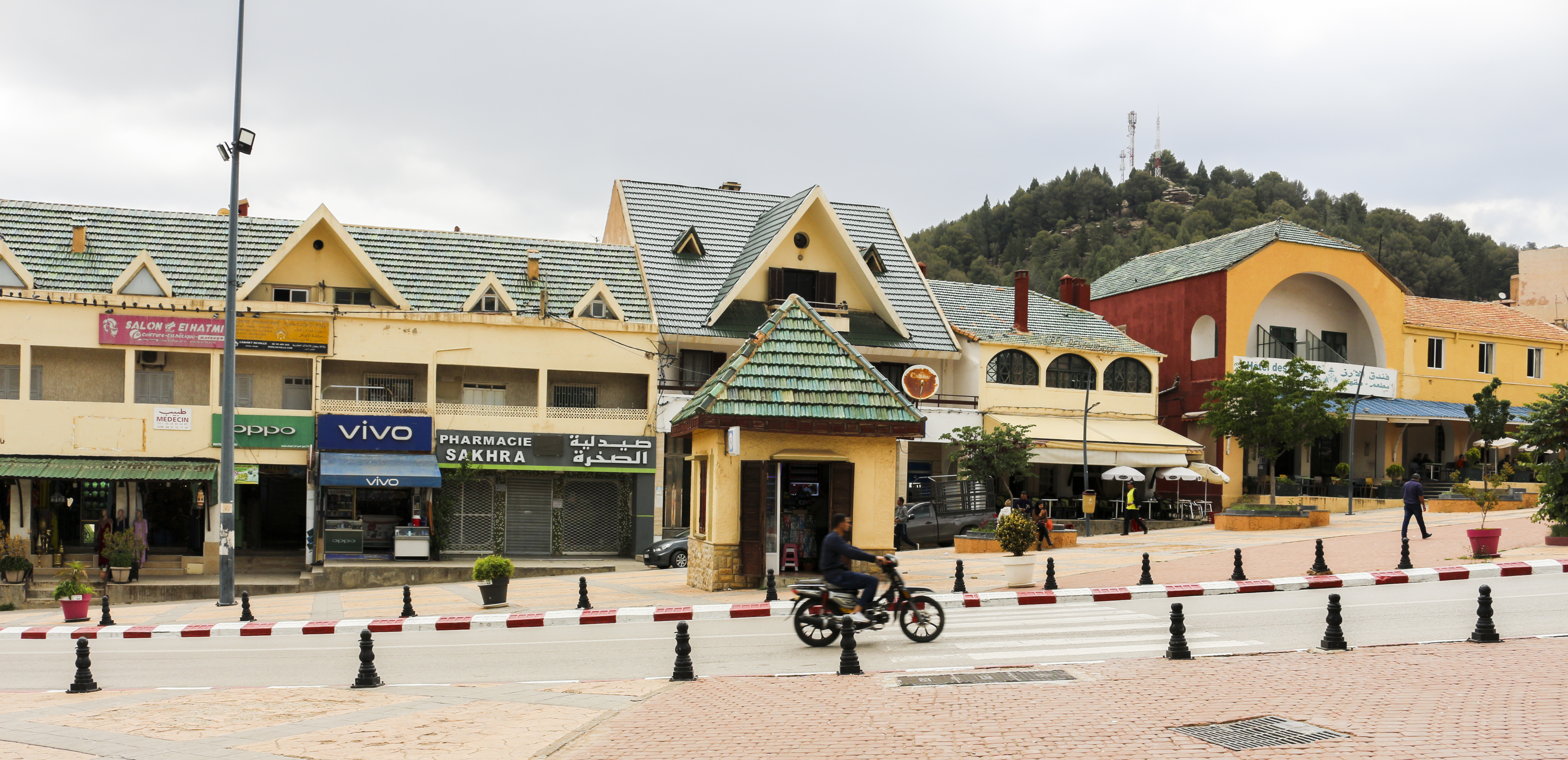
Azrou City center

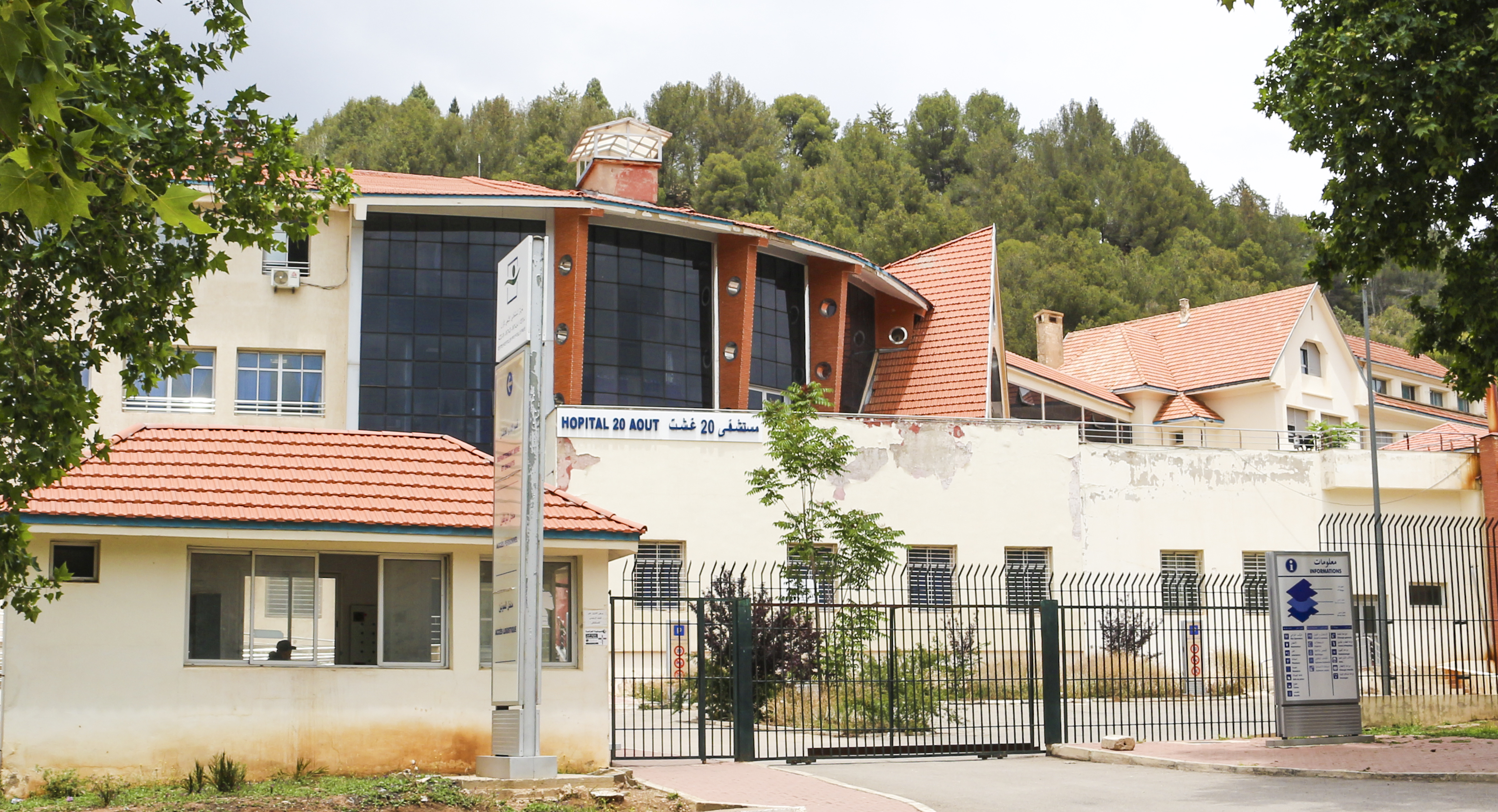
Provincial Hospital

== International relations ==
Azrou signed a protocol of cooperation with Blois in July 2011.
