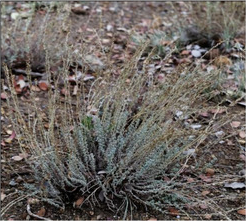

Scientific classification
- Kingdom: Plantae
- Clade: Tracheophytes
- Clade: Angiosperms
- Clade: Eudicots
- Clade: Asterids
- Order: Asterales
- Family: Asteraceae
- Genus: Artemisia
- Species: A. mesatlantica

Binomial name
- Artemisia mesatlantica Maire

= Artemisia mesatlantica =

Species of plant

Artemisia mesatlantica, the blue mugwort, is a species of perennial shrub in the Asteraceae family. It is endemic to Morocco and has been classified by the Union International de Conservation de la Nature en Afrique du Nord (International Union of Nature Conservation in North Africa) as a rare and endangered species. Its essential oil has been extensively studied. Artemisia mesatlantica was described in 1928.

== Distribution ==
Artemisia mesatlantica is endemic to Morocco and is found in the High Atlas, Middle Atlas, and Anti-Atlas regions. It is very widespread between Boulmane and Ifrane in the Middle Atlas, and also thrives in the High Atlas, particularly in poor, stony loamy soils. At an altitude of 1,900 m, Artemisia herba-alba is prevalent alongside Artemisia mesatlantica, which continues to grow up to 2,000 m, where it forms a mixed stand with red juniper.

== Use in traditional medicine ==
Artemisia mesatlantica is widely used in traditional medicine, particularly for treating digestive and genital tract disorders, dermatological issues, as well as for alleviating symptoms of the common cold and managing diabetes.

A 2023 study using experimental animal models showed that the aqueous extract of Artemisia mesatlantica (AMAE) significantly reduced blood glucose levels, improved lipid profiles, and increased hepatic glycogen content in diabetic rats. Pretreatment with 600 mg/kg of AMAE for 7 days effectively prevented increases in plasma total cholesterol, triglycerides, and LDL-c following tyloxapol injection. The results suggest that Artemisia mesatlantica exhibits significant antidiabetic and antihyperlipidemic properties.

== Essential oil ==
Like white sagebrush, the essential oil (EO) of Artemisia mesatlantica primarily consists of oxygenated monoterpenes, including β-thujone, camphor, camphene, and α-thujone, along with flavonoids. Studies on its chemical composition have revealed variability in its volatile compounds, which include terpenoids such as monoterpenes and sesquiterpenes, as well as terpene esters like terpinyl acetate and alcohols like α-terpineol. Dominant components in the EO include β-thujone, camphene, myrcene, tricyclene, and limonene. Other compounds include oxides like 1,8-cineole, sesquiterpene ketones such as piperitone, and sesquiterpenes like α-murolene and δ-cadinene. A study by Sekkat et al. (2017) confirmed that the EO of Artemisia mesatlantica is mainly composed of monoterpenes and sesquiterpenes, particularly β-thujone, followed by camphor and α-thujone. The oil's composition is influenced by extraction methods and environmental factors. It resembles that of Artemisia herba-alba.

The essential oil of Artemisia mesatlantica shows strong corrosion inhibition for mild steel in 1 M HCl, achieving 91% efficiency at a concentration of 2.76 g/L at 303 K, although this effectiveness decreases at higher temperatures. The oil raises the apparent activation energy (Ea) of corrosion, with the inhibition mainly due to its adsorption on the steel surface, in line with El-Awady's kinetic/thermodynamic model. Thermodynamic parameters suggest that the adsorption process is exothermic and primarily driven by electrostatic interactions.

In a 2024 study, the antioxidant, antibacterial, and antifungal activities of essential oils from Artemisia mesatlantica (EOAM) were assessed. GC-MS analysis identified promising active compounds. EOAM exhibited significant antioxidant capacity through DPPH, FRAP, and TAC assays. Antimicrobial tests revealed antibacterial activity with inhibition zones of 20.67 to 38.35 mm and inhibitory doses of 2.34 to 4.78 μg/mL. It also showed antifungal activity, with inhibition diameters of 15.67 to 61.57 mm at doses of 2.90 to 12.54 μg/mL, although it was resistant to Aspergillus flavus. Molecular docking and dynamics simulations, along with ADMET analyses, validated these in vitro results, suggesting EOAM may combat drug-resistant bacteria and holds potential for developing novel antioxidant and antibacterial solutions.
