= Tizguit Valley =

Valley in Morocco

Coordinates: 33°30′N 04°30′W

The Tizguit Valley is a river-cut landform in the Middle Atlas mountain range, in the Fès-Meknès region of Morocco.

Much of the valley is characterised by basaltic rock. This valley is associated with forested areas that may provide habitat for the endangered Barbary macaque, Macaca sylvanus, a primate that prehistorically had a much wider range in northern Morocco.
