= List of ski areas and resorts in Africa =

This is a list of ski areas and resorts in Africa.

Despite the general perception that Africa is too warm for snow, there are several ski areas that exist across the continent.

== Algeria ==
- Chréa
- Tikjda

== Lesotho ==
- Afriski

== Morocco ==
- Ifrane
- Mischliffen
- Oukaimeden

== South Africa ==
- Tiffindell
