= Lake Dayet Hachlaf =

Lake in Ifrane Province, Morocco

Lake Hachlaf
- ضاية حشلاف (Moroccan Arabic)
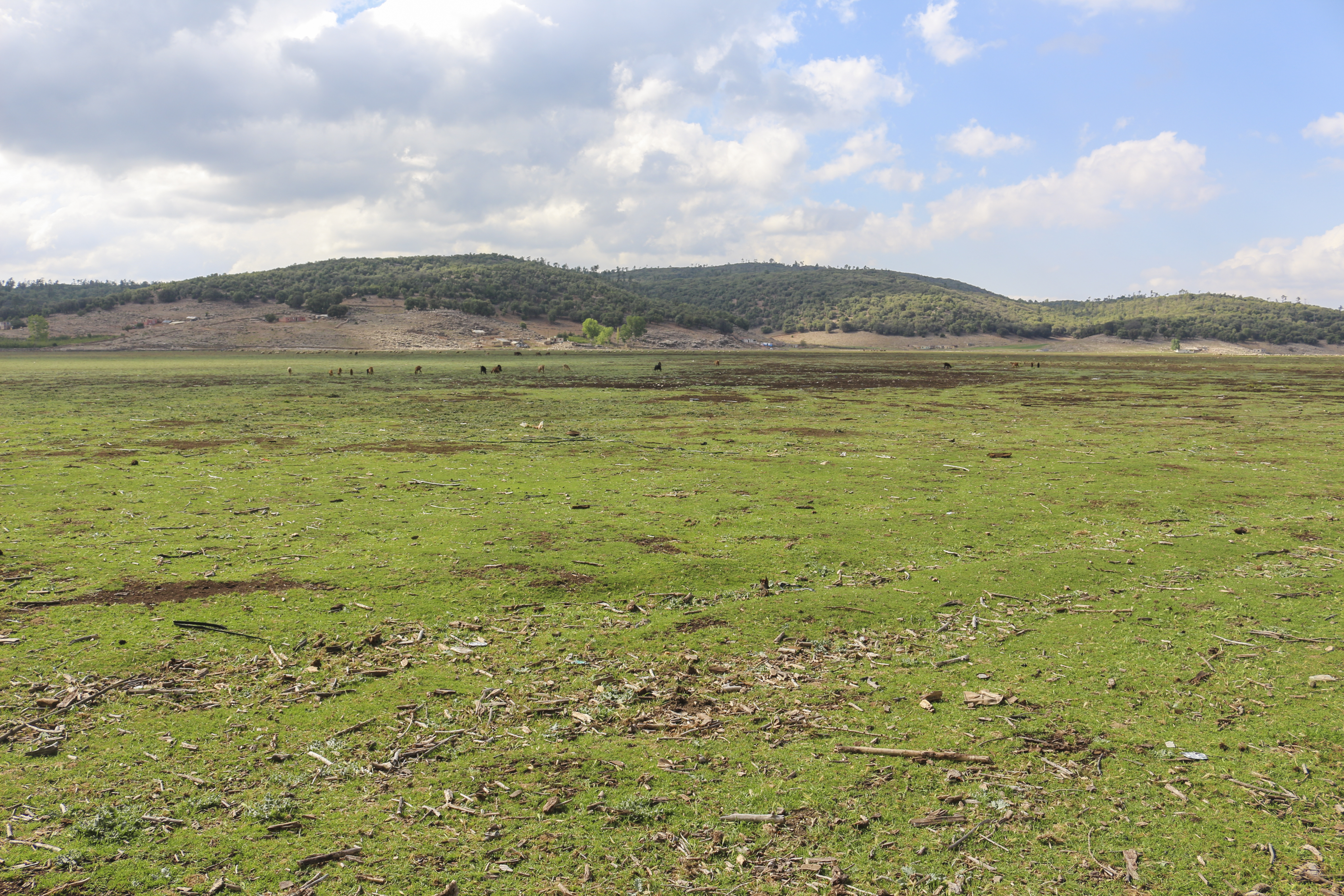
- Interactive map of Lake Hachlaf
- Location: Ifrane Province
- Coordinates: 33°32′58″N 5°0′4″W
- Type: Lake
- Basin countries: Morocco
- Surface area: 14 acres (5.7 ha)
- Surface elevation: 1,650 m (5,410 ft)

Lake Hachlaf (Arabic: Dayet Hachlaf) is a lake situated within the commune of Dayat Aoua in the Ifrane Province. The lake is surrounded by willow trees and serves as a habitat for trout, which are nourished by various water springs. Lake Hachlaf encompasses an area of approximately 14 hectares, with a maximum depth of 3 m (9.8 ft), situated at an altitude of 1,650 meters above sea level. Trout fishing is a popular activity at the lake from May to August. In 2022, Lake Hachlaf dried up completely.

== Photo gallery ==
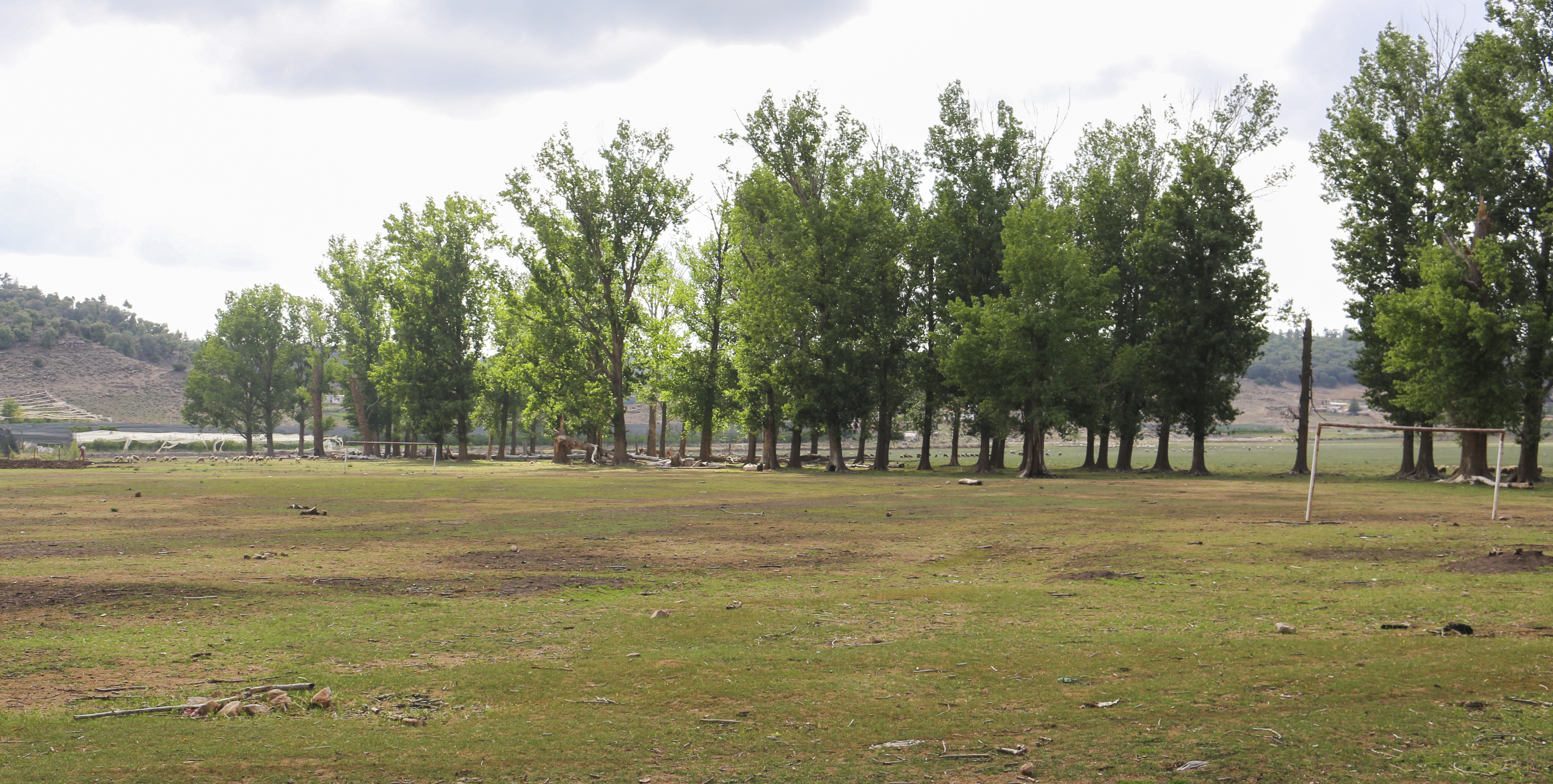

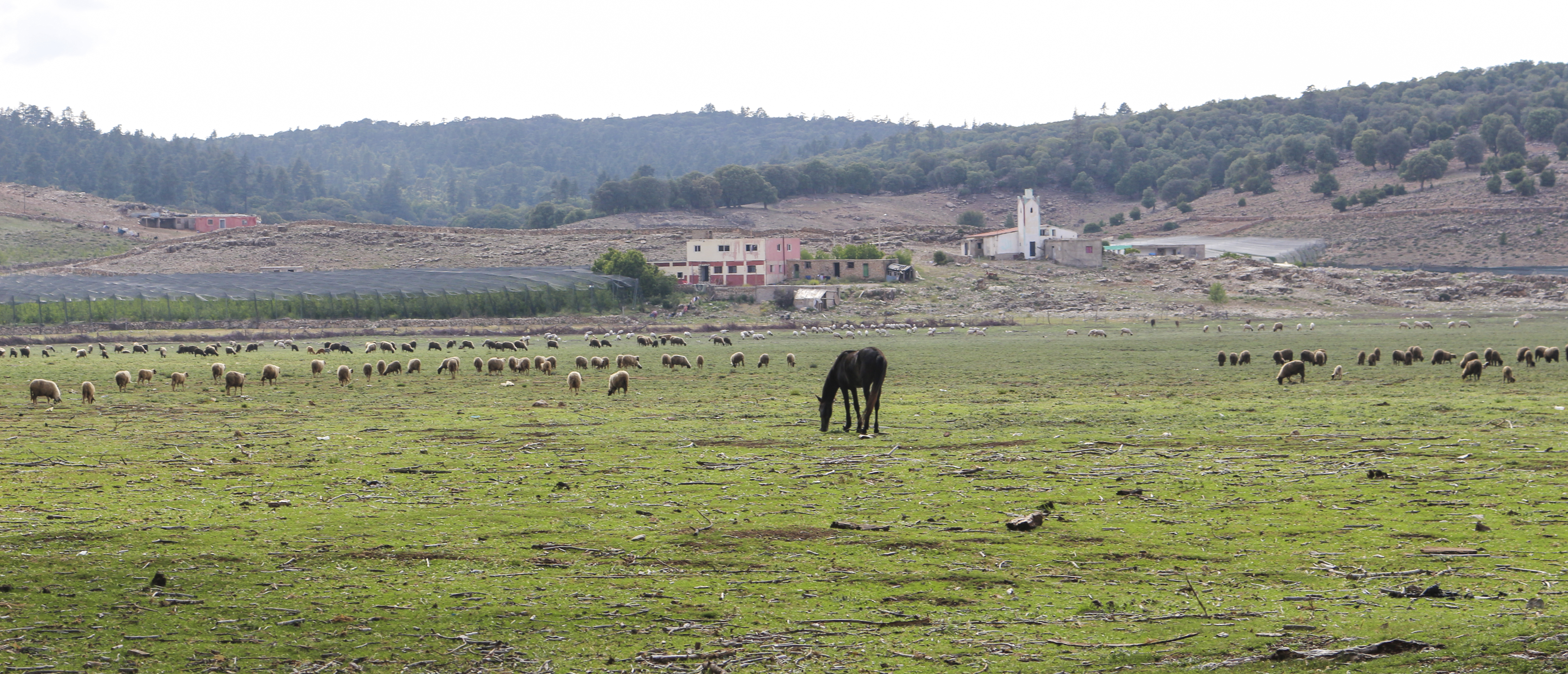

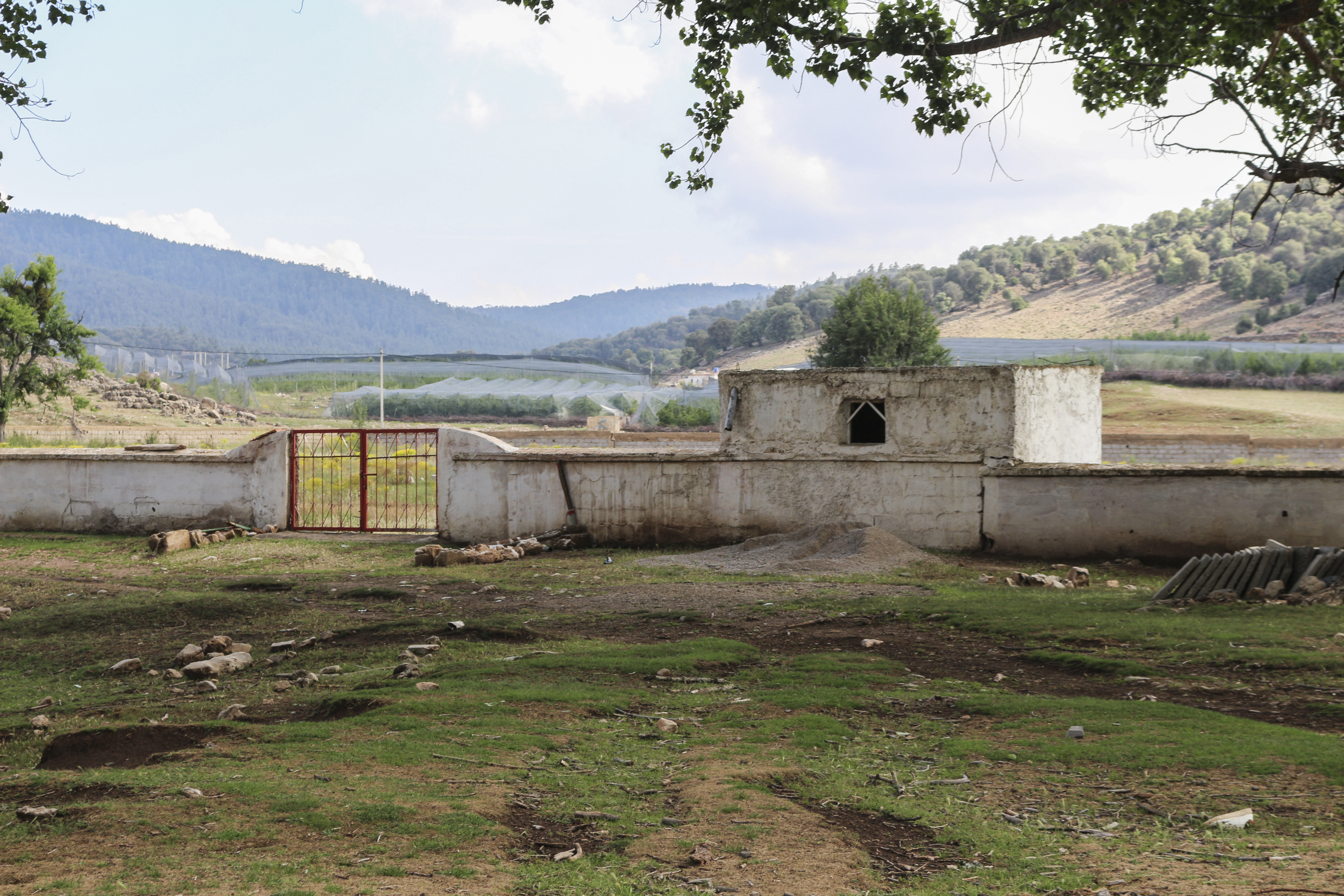

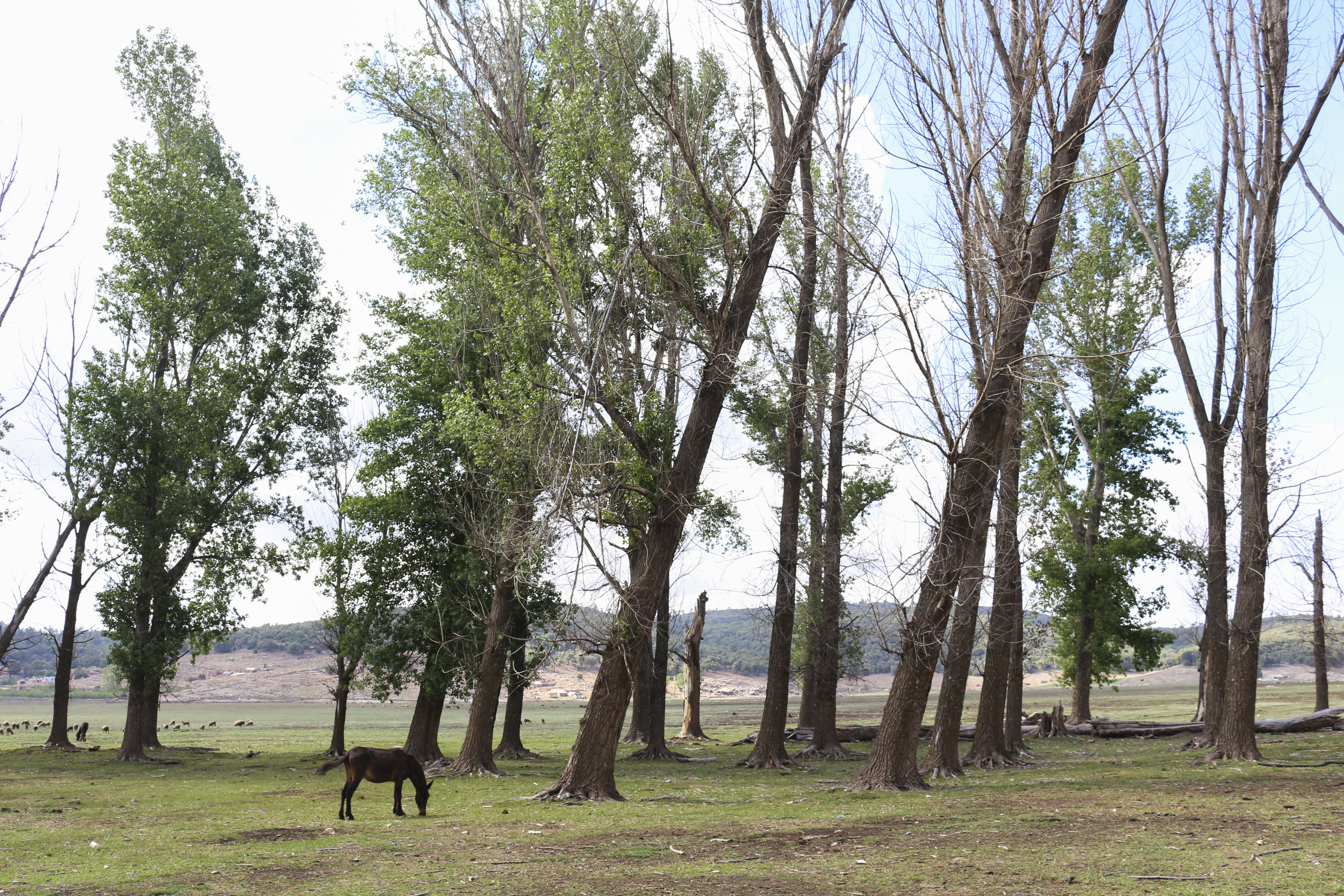

== See also ==
- Lake Zerrouka
- Akalamm Abkhane
