= Afriski =

Ski resort in Lesotho

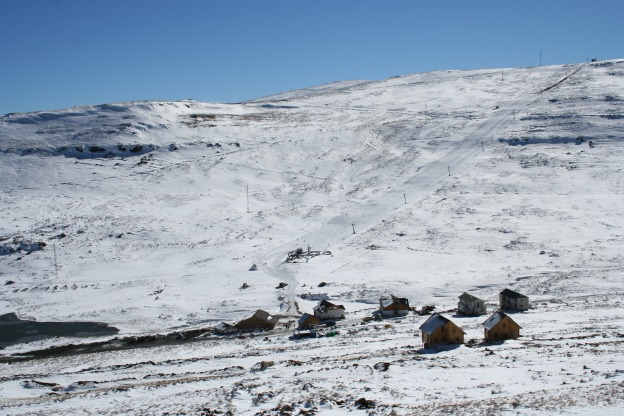
- The ski slope at Afriski
- Interactive map of Afriski
- Location: Lesotho
- Coordinates: 28°49′22″S 28°43′41″E
- Vertical: 305 m (1,001 ft)
- Top elevation: 3,222 m (10,571 ft)
- Base elevation: 2,917 m (9,570 ft)
- Trails: 6
- Total length: 1.7 km (1.1 mi)
- Lift capacity: 1500 people/hour
- Terrain parks: yes
- Website: Afriski.net

Afriski is the only skiing resort in Lesotho, located 3050 m above sea-level (just below Mahlasela Pass, 3222 m) in the Maluti Mountains, operating in Southern Africa near the northern border of Lesotho with South Africa.

== Overview ==
Afriski is one of only two ski resorts in Sub-Saharan Africa. The history of the resort dates back to the 1960s, when the Maluti Ski Club was founded in the area and operated ski lodges in the winter season. The resort is a 4.5-hour drive from Johannesburg or Pretoria via the steep tarred Moteng pass and the Mahlasela pass; it sits along Highway A1. The resort can accommodate about 320 people and offers a 1 km ski slope, beginners slope and operates during the winter months (June–August). Afriski also operates in the summer months and offer a variety of activities, from mountain biking, guided Enduro motorbike trips, paintball, hiking, trail running, and more.

== See also ==
- Tiffindell Ski Resort - South Africa's only ski resort
- List of ski areas and resorts in Africa
