= Lake Afennourrir =

Lake in Morocco

Coordinates: 33.280°N 5.253°W

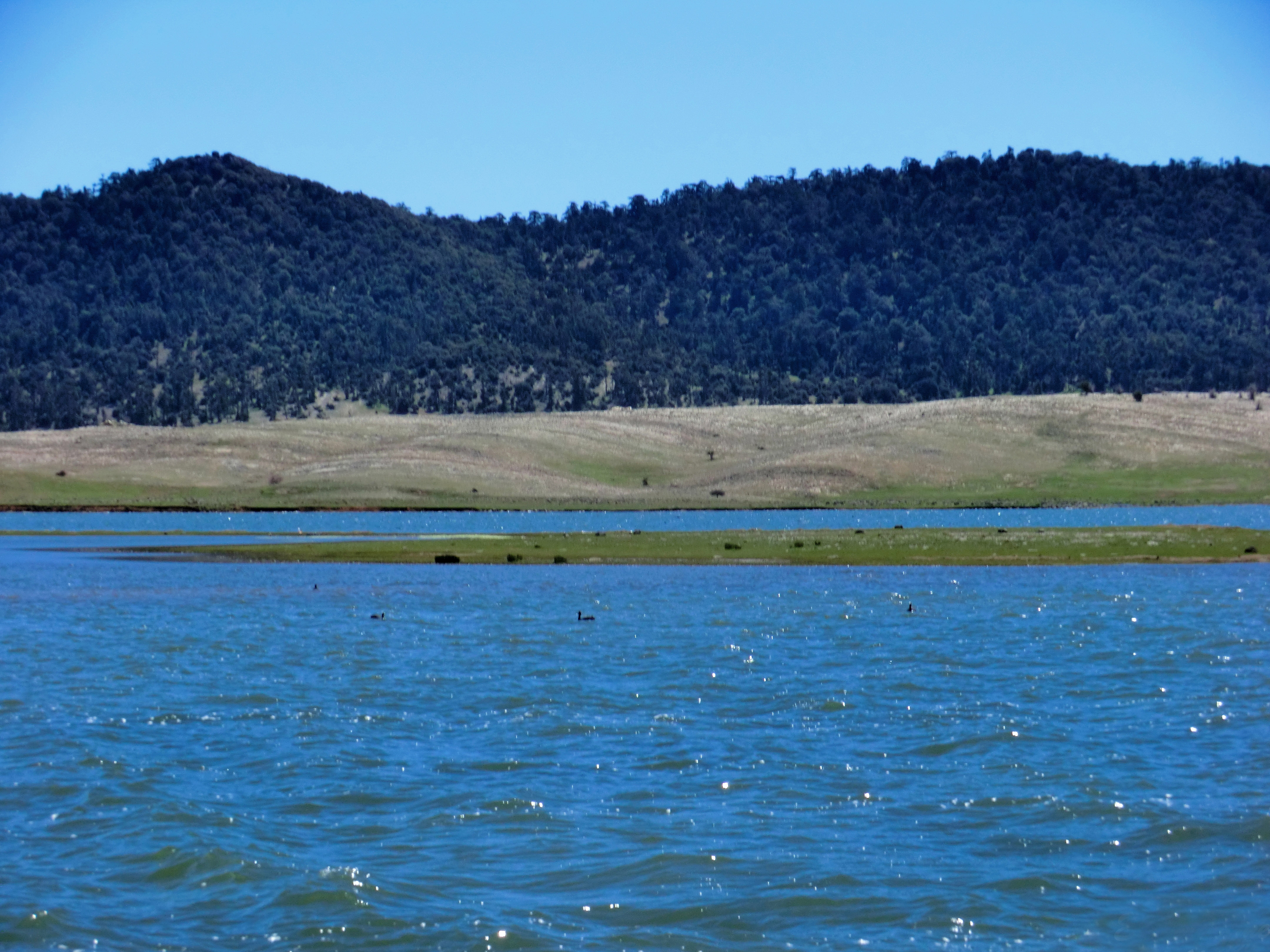
Lake Afennourir

Lake Afnourir is a high-altitude lake located in the Ain El Louh commune in Ifrane province, about 30 km from the city of Azrou, in Morocco. This lake extends over an area of 300 hectares and is located at an altitude of 1800 meters above sea level.

Its geographical location in the middle of a cedar forest gave it Ramsar status on June 20, 1990, listed among the wetlands of the Middle Atlas, due to the ecological and hydrological functions they fulfill, for the conservation of global biological diversity and the sustainability of human life.

== General location ==
It is located on a plateau of the tabular Middle Atlas, 20 kilometers south of the city of Azrou, on the tertiary road connecting the village of Aïn Leuh to the RP 20 (connecting Azrou to Midelt). It belongs to the Commune of Aïn Leuh (province of Ifrane).

== Renovation ==
In 2017, Morocco’s High Commission for Water and Forests released a large amount of fish into Lake Afennourir of different species, which totaled more than 180,000 fish. This operation was aimed to restore the ecological balance of this lake, which was affected by a wave of drought and climate change leading to the death of many fish and the migration of birds that used to gather in the area.
