= Ski lift =

Transport device that carries skiers up a hill

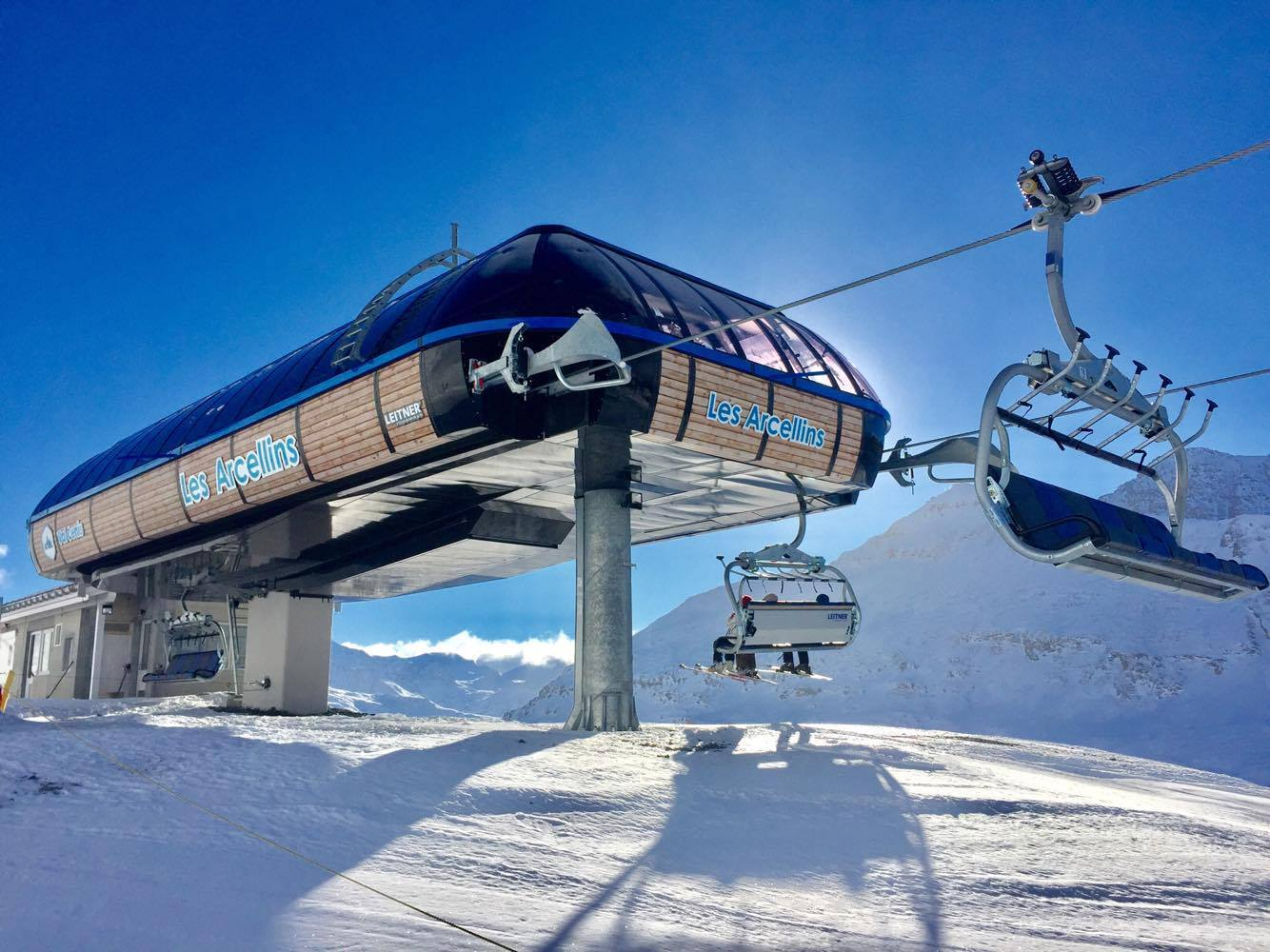
Chairlift mechanism in the resort of Val Cenis Vanoise, France

A ski lift is a mechanism for transporting skiers up a hill. Ski lifts are typically a paid service at ski resorts. The first ski lift was built in 1908 by German Robert Winterhalder in Schollach/Eisenbach, Hochschwarzwald.

== Types ==
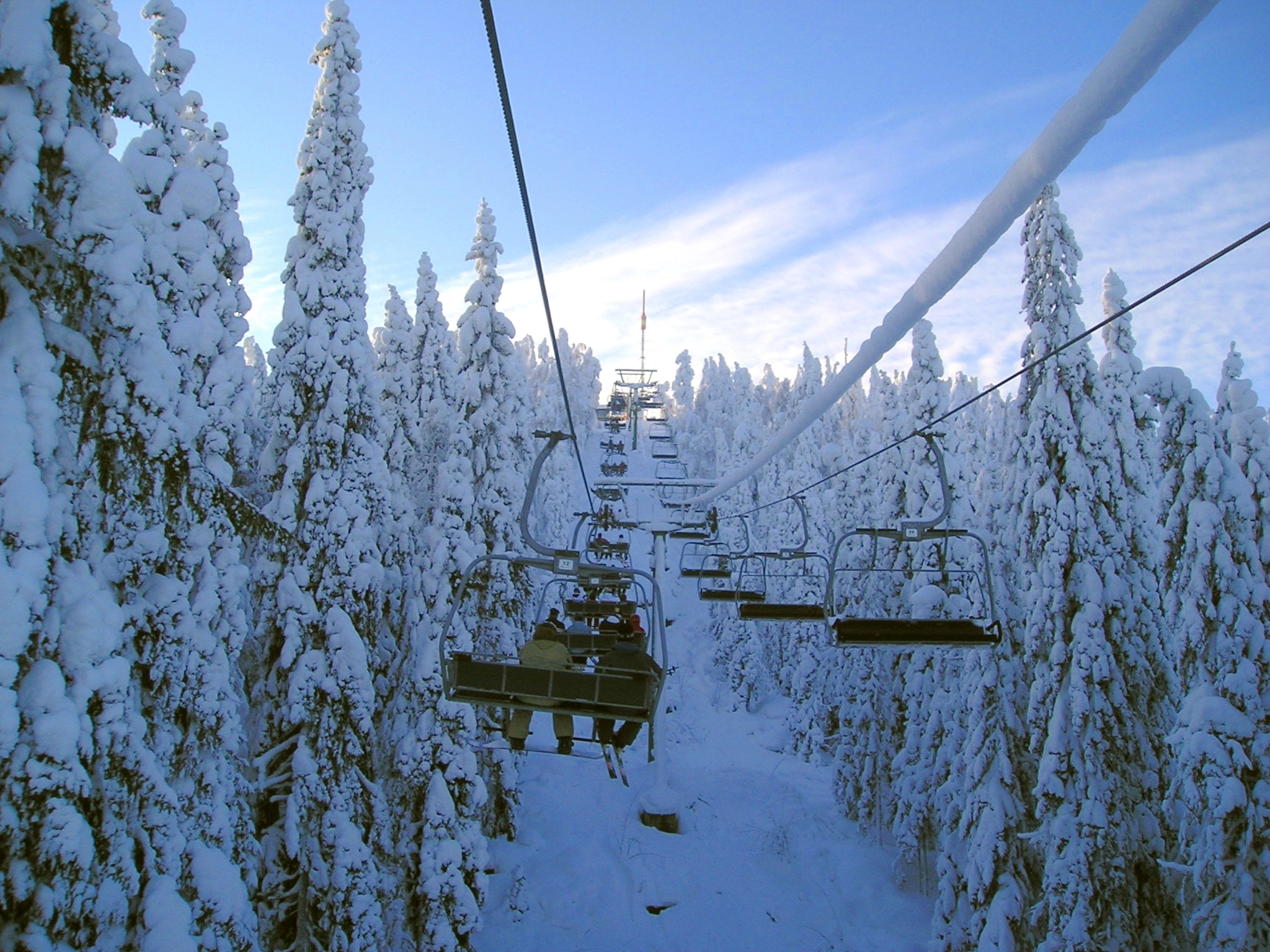
A chairlift at the ski resort of Vuokatti in Sotkamo, Kainuu, Finland in 2006

- Aerial lifts transport skiers while suspended off the ground. Aerial lifts are often bicable ropeways, the "bi-" prefix meaning that the cables have two different functions (carrying and pulling).
  - Aerial tramways
  - Chairlifts and detachable chairlifts
  - Funifors
  - Funitels
  - Gondola lifts
  - Hybrid lifts
- Surface lifts, including T-bars, magic carpets, and rope tows.
- Cable railways, including funiculars
- Helicopters are used for heliskiing and snowcats for snowcat skiing. This is backcountry skiing or boarding accessed by a snowcat or helicopter instead of a lift, or by hiking. Cat skiing is less than half the cost of heliskiing, more expensive than a lift ticket but is easier than ski touring. Cat skiing is guided. Skiing at select, extreme resorts, like Silverton Mountain, is also guided, even when skiing just off the lift.

== Locations ==
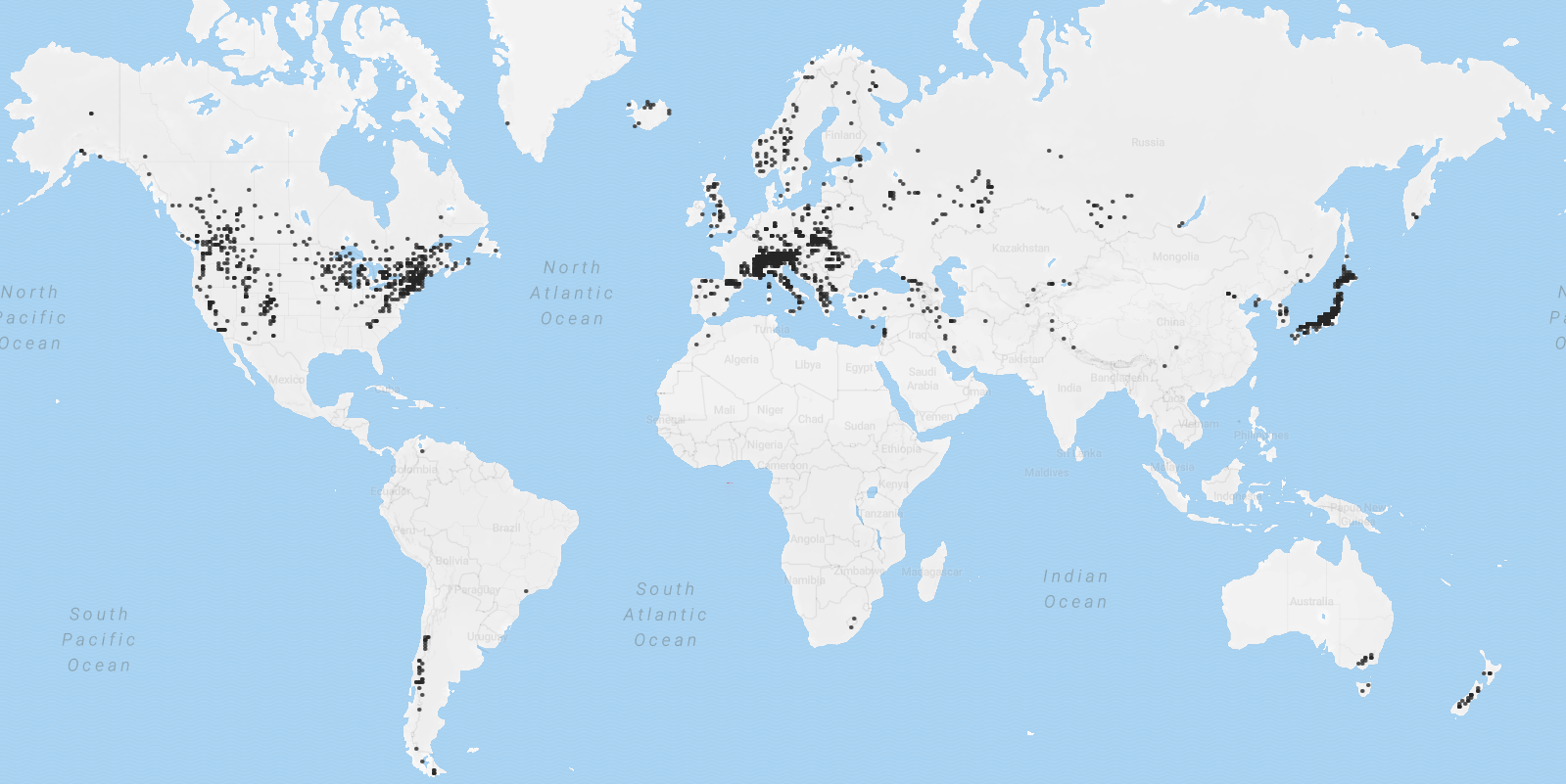
Map of world ski resorts

Ski lifts are built in many parts of the world. Extreme locations of outdoor ski lifts:

- The northernmost is on Spitsbergen, Norway
- The southernmost is near Ushuaia, Argentina
- The closest to the equator in the northern hemisphere is near Liang, China
- The closest to the equator in the southern hemisphere is near Mahlasela, Lesotho
