= Had Oued Ifrane =

Coordinates: 33°32′N 5°07′W

- Town
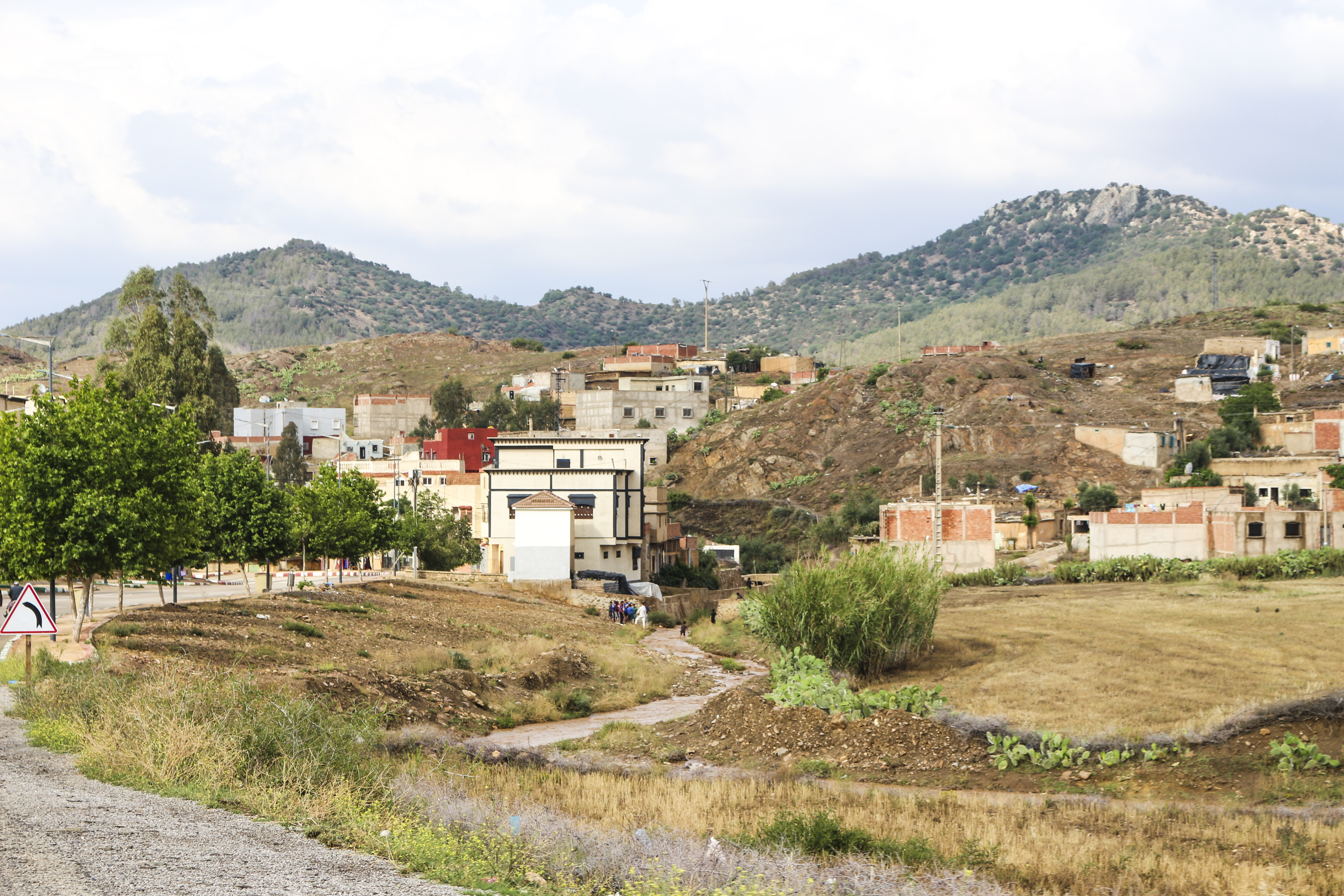
- Souk El Had, The Center of Oued Ifrane Commune in Ifrane Province, Morocco
- Interactive map of Had Oued Ifrane
- Country: Morocco
- Region: Fès-Meknès
- Province: Ifrane

Population (2004)
  - Total: 2,488
- Time zone: UTC+0 (GMT)

Had Oued Ifrane is a town in Ifrane Province, Fès-Meknès, Morocco. According to the 2004 census it had a population of 2,488.
