= Sidi Addi =

Coordinates: 31.5°N 8.1°W

Sidi Addi Sidi El Makhfi
- Town
- Interactive map of Sidi Addi
- Country: Morocco
- Region: Fès-Meknès
- Province: Ifrane

Population (2004)
  - Total: 2,896
- Time zone: UTC+0 (GMT)

Sidi Addi is a town in Ifrane Province, Fès-Meknès, Morocco. it the administrative center of the Sidi El Makhfi commune. According to the 2004 census, it has a population of 2895.
