= Lake Dayet-Aoua =

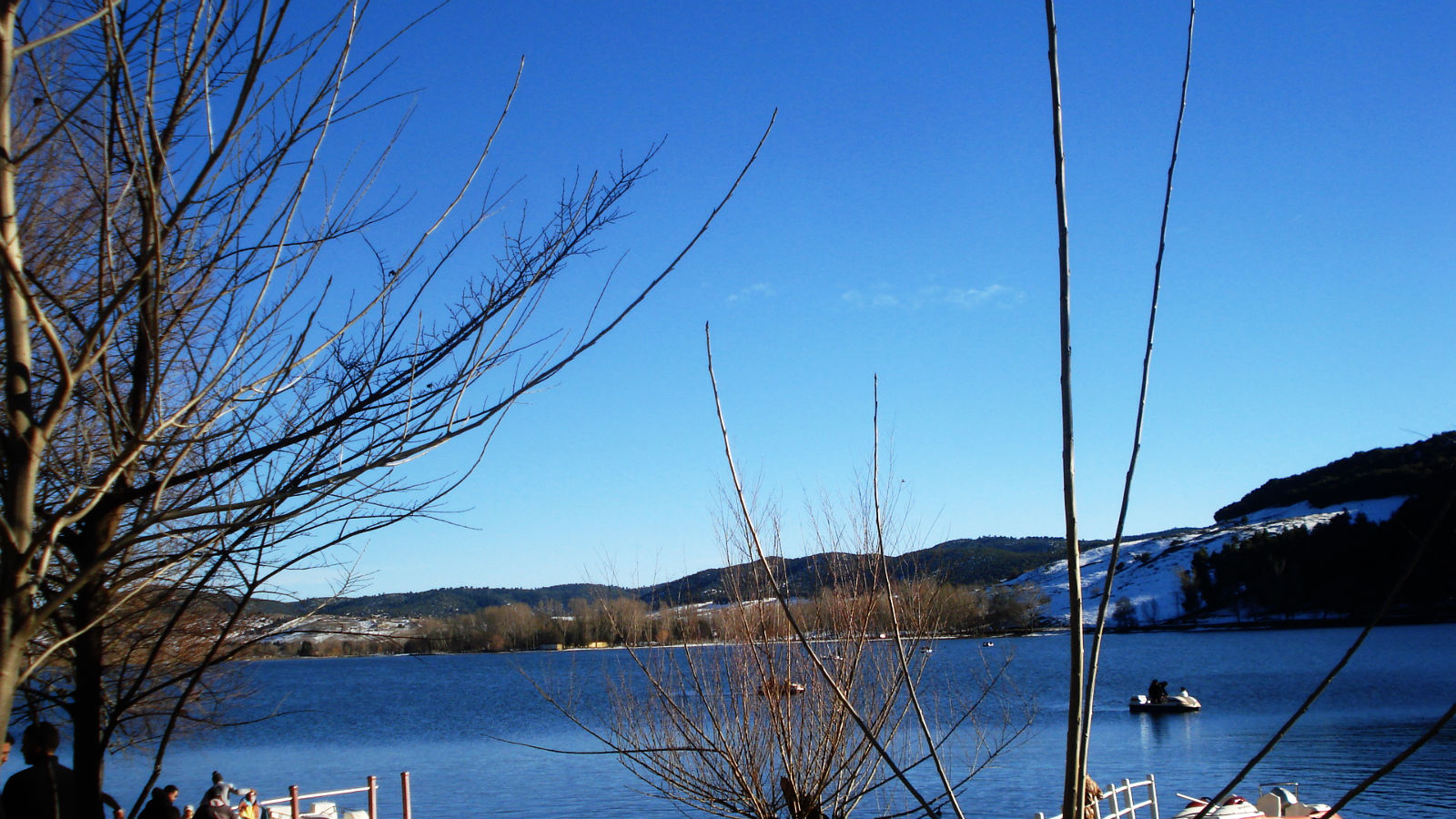
- Lake Dayet-Aoua

- Location within Morocco
- Location: Northern Morocco
- Coordinates: 33°39′05″N 5°01′50″W
- Type: Natural lake
- Basin countries: Morocco
- Surface area: 140 km^{2} (54 sq mi)
- Average depth: 4–5 m (13–16 ft)
- Max. depth: 5 m (16 ft)
- Surface elevation: 1,460 m (4,790 ft)
- Islands: none
- Settlements: Ifrane Province

Lake Dayet-Aoua is a lake, in northern Morocco, in the Middle Atlas at an altitude of 1,460 metres (4,790 ft). It belongs to the Ifrane Province within the Fès-Meknès region.

After many years of the drought, the lake dried up, despite showing some signs of recovery in early 2026.

== Location ==
Its access is very easy, located 15 kilometres (9.3 mi) north of Ifrane by the RN 24 Ifrane-Fès, rural commune of Ifrane, which directly overlooks the 140-hectare (350-acre) lake, its surface area varies according to different times of the seasons. Lake's depth remains low, 4–5 metres (13–16 ft) upstream (west) and a downstream part (east) silted up, marshy in appearance, exondable in summer.

The lake is surrounded by a low wet meadow and forests of holm oaks (Quercus rotundifolia) and cedrus: Cedrus atlantica. A belt of poplars and a few willows surround the lake on its immediate edges. It is one of the few mountainous wetlands with a wide variety of habitats (shallow water, wet meadow, emergent marsh, mudflats and forest).The submerged and emerged flora is abundant and very diverse; presence of Myriophyllum spicatum, Juncus bufonius, carex sp, Persicaria amphibia, Ranunculus millifoliatus, Schoenoplectus lacustris, Phragmites australis and Typha sp.

This lake contributes to the revitalization of the economic activity of the region. Tourist activity is one main source of income for the region. In 2018, the lake dried up and became an infertile land. In 2023, the framework agreement for the 2023-2024 partnership was signed for the ecological rehabilitation of Lake Dayet Aoua.

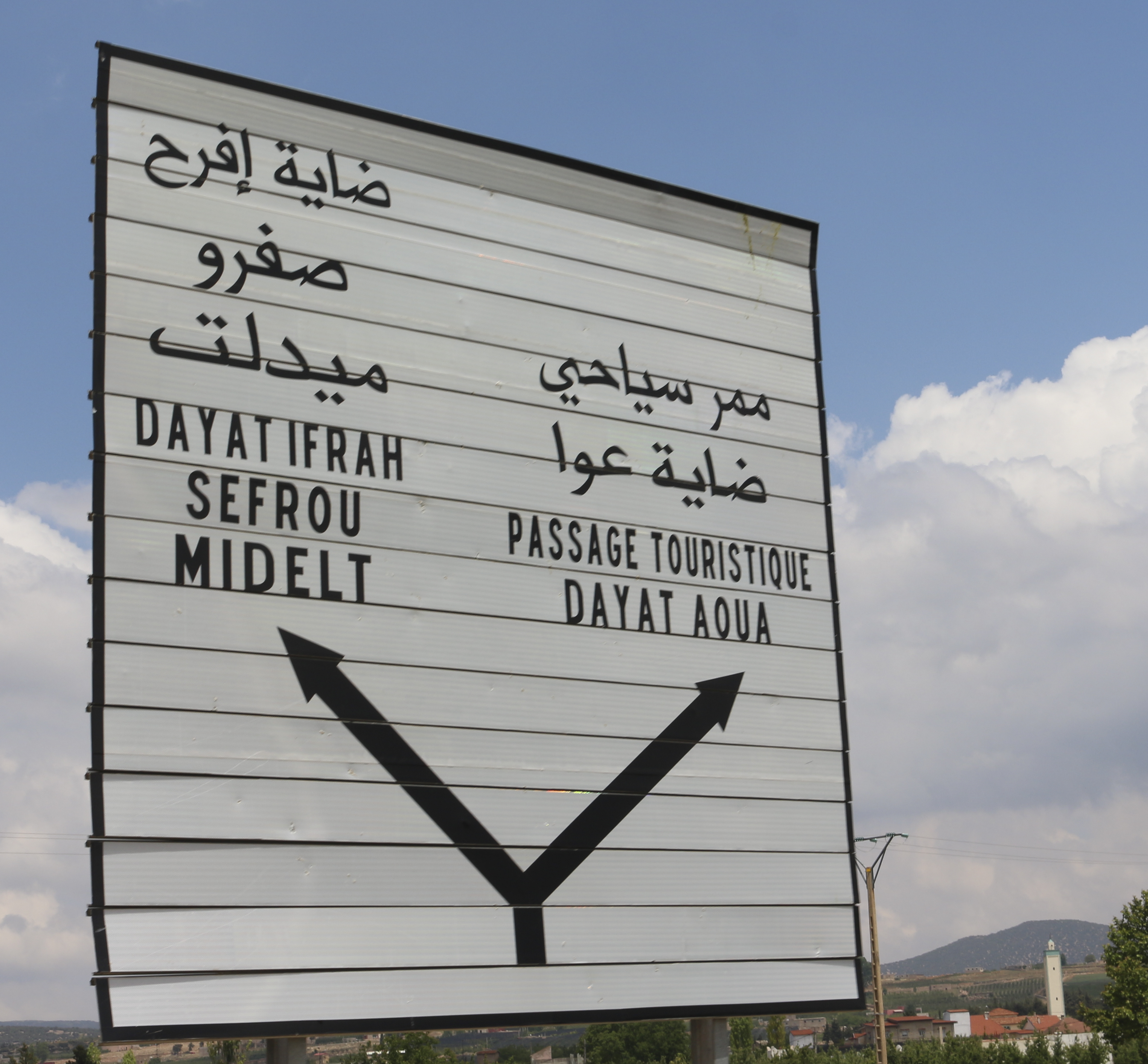
Dayet Aoua Lake in 2023

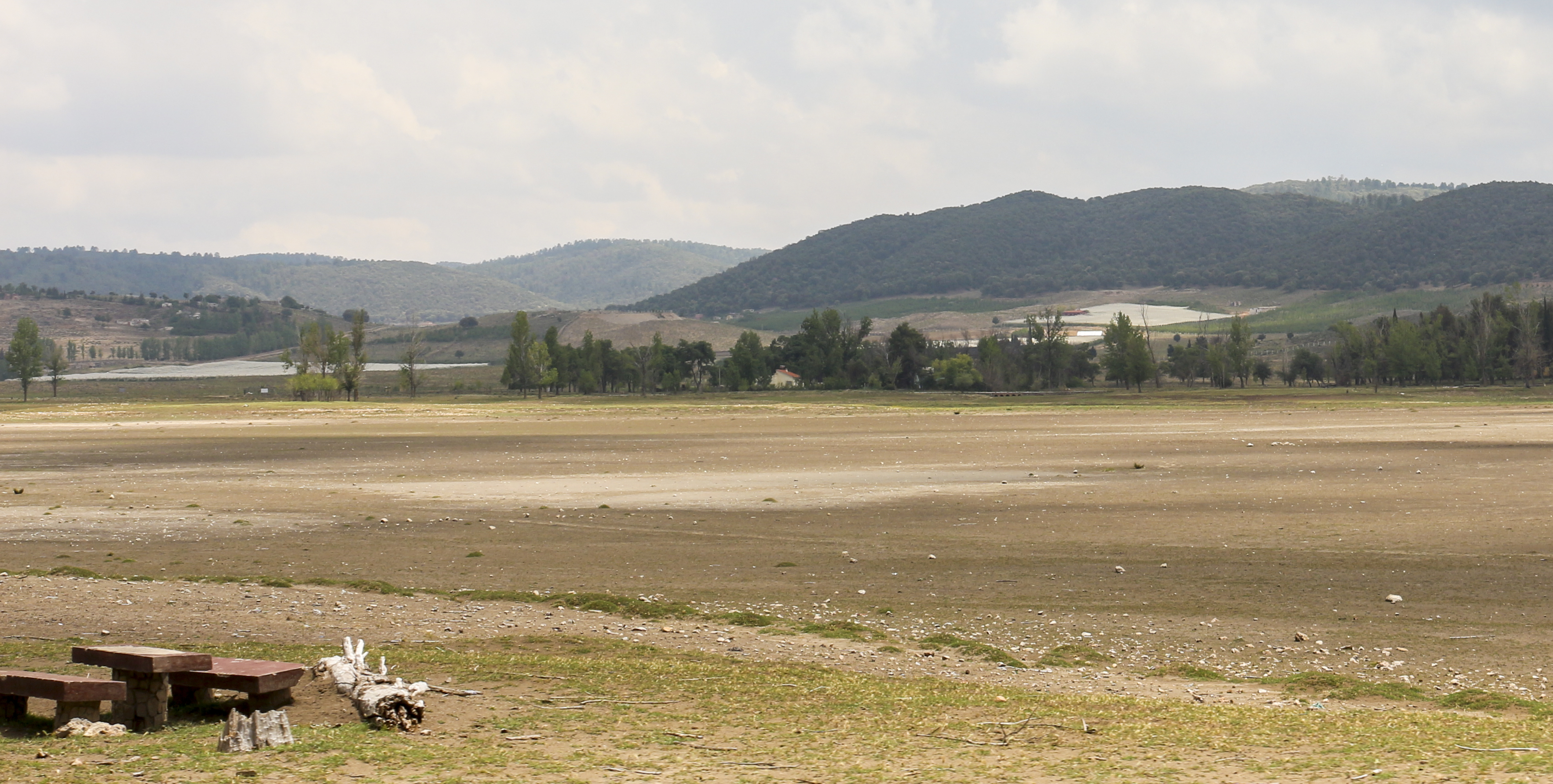
Dayet Aoua Lake in 2023
