= Ain Leuh =

- Town
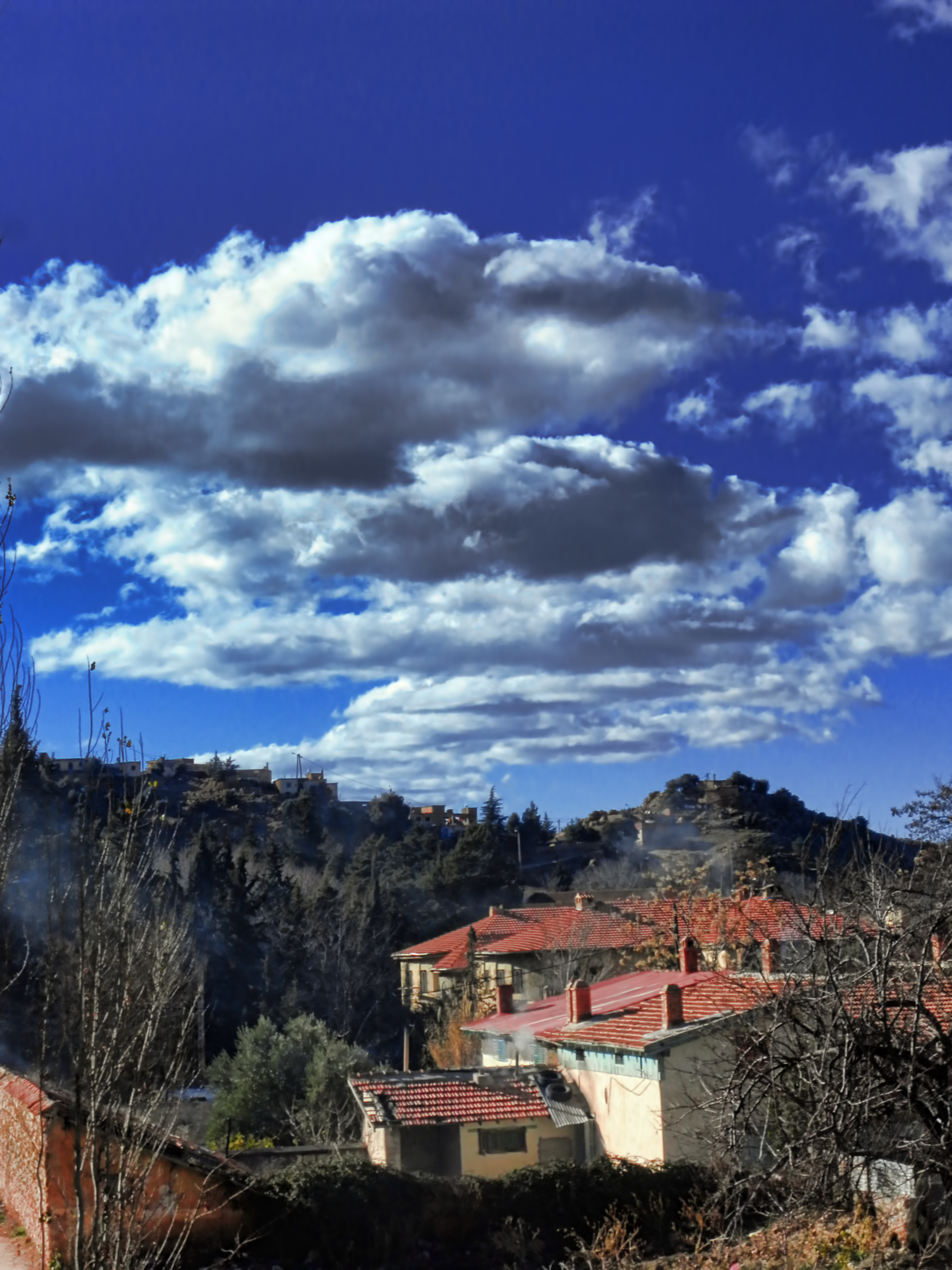
- Interactive map of Ain Leuh
- Coordinates: 33°17′N 5°23′W
- Country: Morocco
- Region: Fès-Meknès
- Province: Ifrane Province

Population (2004)
  - Total: 5,278
- Time zone: UTC+0 (GMT)

Ain Leuh is a town in Ifrane Province, Fès-Meknès, Morocco. According to the 2004 census it has a population of 5278.
