= Timahdite =

Timahdite تيمحضيت ⵜⵉⵎⵄⴹⵉⵜ
- Town
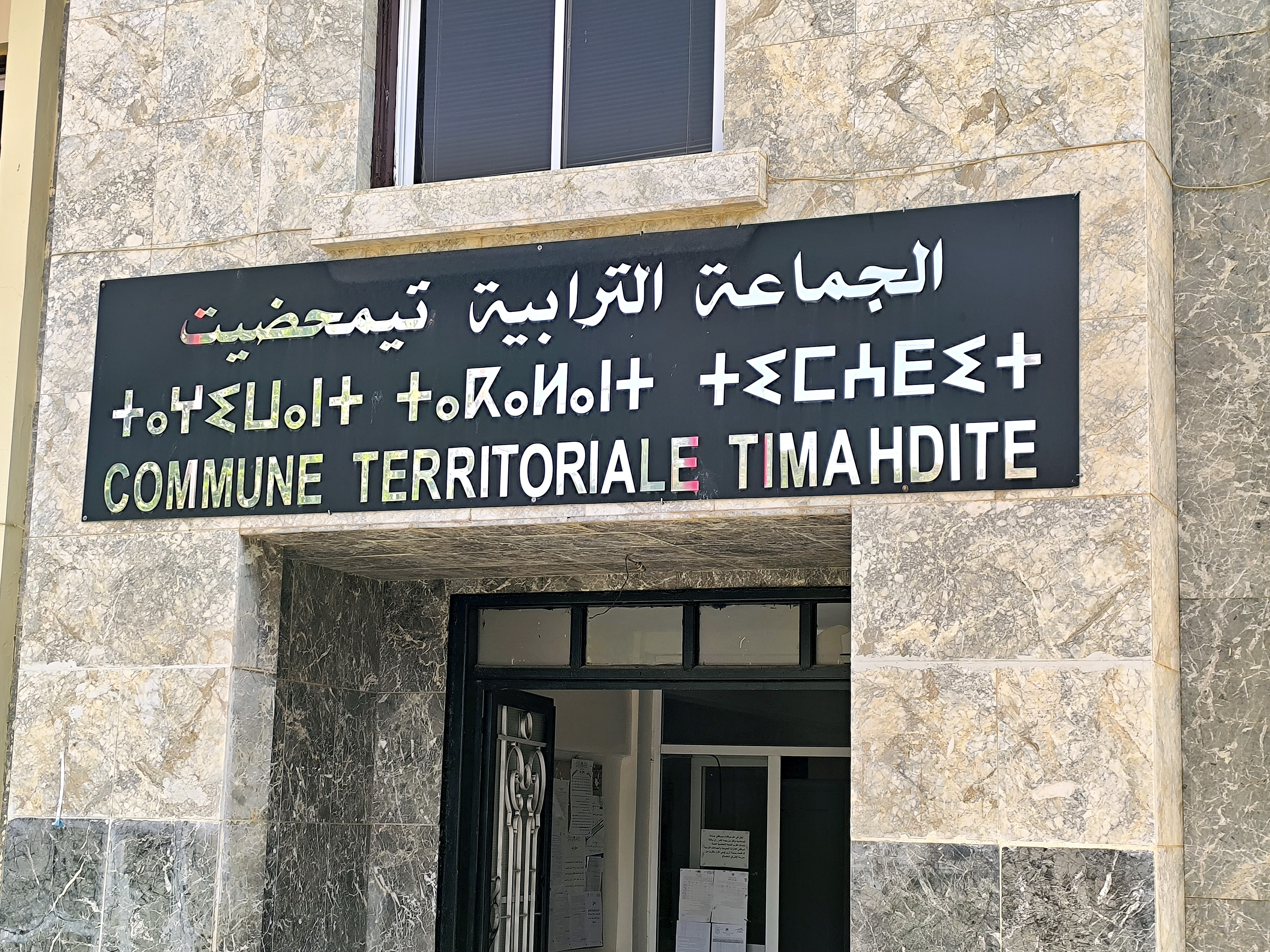
- Interactive map of Timahdite
- Coordinates: 33°14′13″N 5°3′36″W
- Country: Morocco
- Region: Fès-Meknès
- Province: Ifrane

Population (2004)
  - Total: 2,507
- Time zone: UTC+0 (GMT)

Timahdite is a town in Ifrane Province, Fès-Meknès, Morocco. According to the 2004 census it has a population of 2507. Located at an altitude of 1800 metres, it lies in the heart of Middle Atlas Mountains, in an area with a harsh climate.

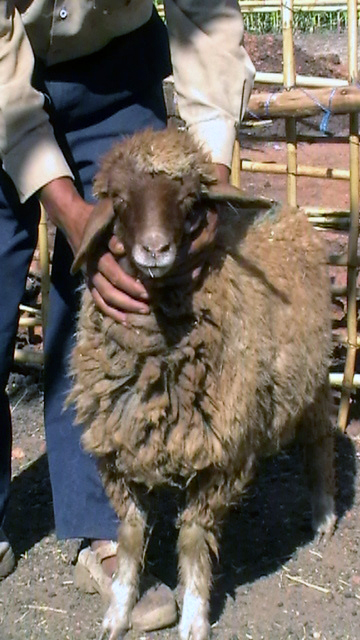
Timahdite sheep

The local breed of Timahdite sheep is one of the major Moroccan sheep breeds.

== Geography ==
Timahdite is located 30 kilometres south of the city of Azrou and 5 kilometres north of Ifrane. The Sebou River, the second longest river in Morocco, has its source not far from the town in a river upstream known as the Wadi Guigou and is fed from melting snow and from springs. Twenty kilometres south of the town is Lake Aguelmame Sidi Ali within Khénifra Province at an altitude of 2100 metres. Timahdite has a very cold climate with some of the lowest temperatures in Africa.
