= Mahlasela Pass =

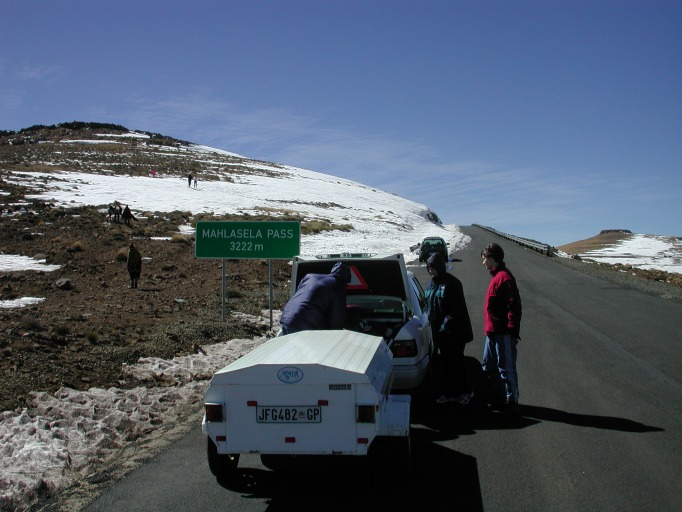

- Location within Lesotho
- Elevation: 3,222 m (10,571 ft)

Location
- Location: Lesotho
- Coordinates: 28°48′56″S 28°43′10″E

The Mahlasela pass is a tarred pass in the Maloti mountains of Lesotho, reaching a height of 3222 meters. It is one of two passes that links the town of Butha-Buthe with the diamond mining town of Mokhotlong, the other pass being the Moteng pass. Heavy snowfalls frequently close the pass in winter. The only skiing resort in Lesotho, Afriski is situated here. It is considered to be the highest road pass in Southern Africa.
