= Ifrane Province =

Province in Fès-Meknès, Morocco

Coordinates: 33.381°N 5.247°W

Ifrane Province إقليم إفران ⵜⴰⵙⴳⴰ ⵏ ⵉⴼⵔⴰⵏ
- Province
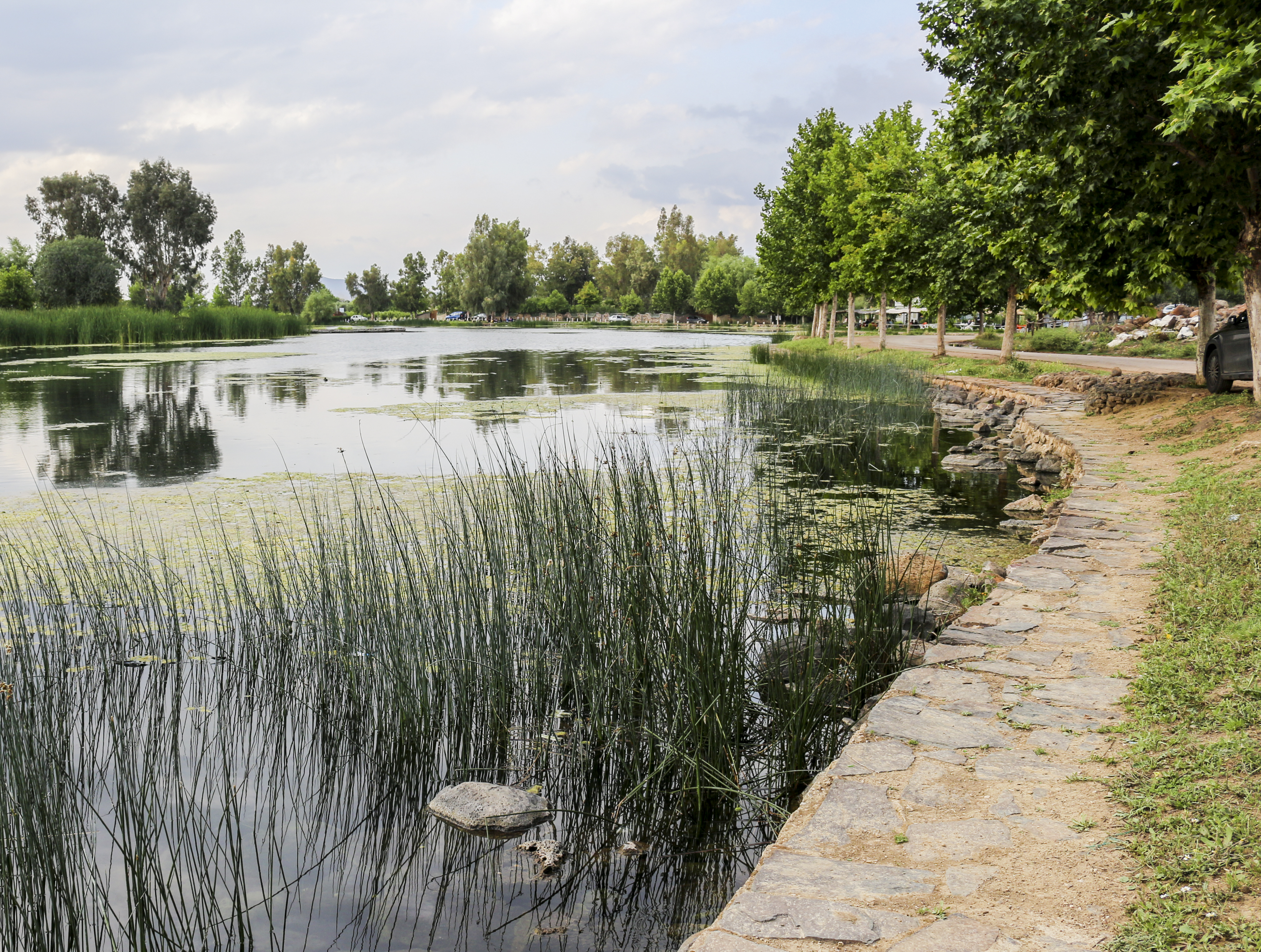
- Zaouiat Ifrane and its waterfalls Lake Amghass, Sidi El Makhfi Michlifen

- Flag
- Interactive map of Ifrane Province
- Country: Morocco
- Region: Fez-Meknes
- Seat: Ifrane

Population (2024)
  - Total: 160,904

Ifrane Province is a province in northern Morocco, located within the Fez-Meknes region. Its administrative center and namesake is the city of Ifrane, known for its distinctive architecture and its role as a tourist destination, while the biggest city is Azrou.

== Geography ==
The province is situated in the central part of the Middle Atlas mountain range. It features a landscape of high plateaus, forested areas, and mountainous terrain. The climate is relatively cool compared to much of Morocco, with cold winters that often bring snowfall and mild summers. The region is known for its extensive cedar forests and natural water bodies.

Several lakes are located within the province, including:

- Dayet Hachlaf
- Dayet Ifrah
- Lake Zerrouka
- Dayet Aoua

These lakes contribute to the ecological diversity of the region and are part of the natural environment associated with Ifrane National Park.

== Economy ==
The province’s economy is based on tourism, forestry, and agriculture. Tourism is a key sector due to the region’s natural environment, ski facilities such as Michlifen, and its appeal as both a summer and winter destination.

Agricultural activity includes cereal cultivation and livestock farming adapted to the mountainous conditions.

== Administrative divisions ==
Communes of Ifrane Province

Ifrane Province is divided into several municipalities and rural communes :

=== Municipalities ===
Name	Geographic code	Households (2024)	Population (2024)
Azrou	271.01.01.	16228	57657
Ifrane	271.01.03.	3814	13964

=== Rural communes ===
Name	Geographic code	Households (2024)	Population (2024)	Notes
Ain Leuh	271.03.01.	2731	8989	Urban centre: Ain Leuh (4,774 inhabitants; 1,486 households)
Ben Smim	271.03.03.	1698	7676	
Dayat Aoua	271.01.05.	2818	12050	
Oued Ifrane	271.03.05.	2821	10267	Urban centre: Souk L'had (2,893 inhabitants; 911 households)
Sidi El Makhfi	271.03.07.	4264	16441	Urban centre: Sidi Addi (5,025 inhabitants; 1,399 households)
Tigrigra	271.03.09.	2543	10085	
Timahdite	271.03.11.	3004	11571	Urban centre: Timahdite (4,582 inhabitants; 1,278 households)
Tizguite	271.01.07.	2763	12204	
