= Michlifen =

Town in Morocco

Coordinates: 33°32′4.85″N 5°6′27.36″W

Tourists in the snow-covered landscape of Michlifen

Michlifen is a mountain town in the Middle Atlas of Morocco at an elevation of 2,100 metres (6,900 ft).

It is located in the commune of Ben Smim, Ifrane Province.

It is considered to be the "Moroccan Aspen" with skiing facilities in the winter..

== Sources ==
- Michlifen Weather Forecast, Snow Report and Resort Information, Snow-Forecast.com.
