= Moteng Pass =

Mountain pass in northern Lesotho

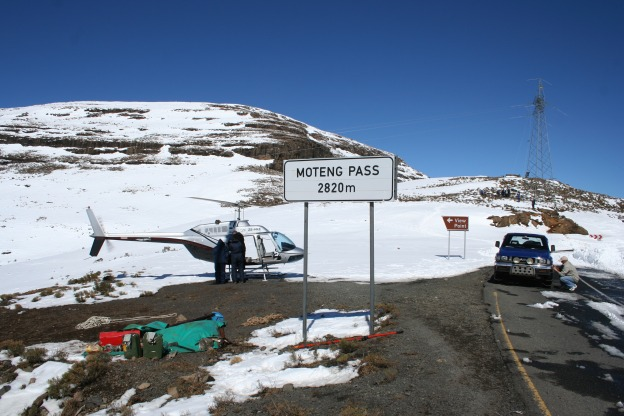
- Top of Moteng Pass

- Location within Lesotho
- Elevation: 2,820 metres (9,250 ft)

Third Approach
- Location: Lesotho
- Range: Maloti mountains
- Coordinates: 28°45′21″S 28°36′01″E

The Moteng pass is a steep tarred pass in the Maloti mountains of Lesotho, reaching a height of 2,820 m (9,250 ft). It is one of two passes that links the town of Butha-Buthe with the diamond mining town of Mokhotlong, the other pass being the Mahlasela pass. Heavy snowfall frequently closes the pass in winter. The pass is 7.9 km long, with the last stage being extremely dangerous in winter due to patches of ice.

== Gallery ==
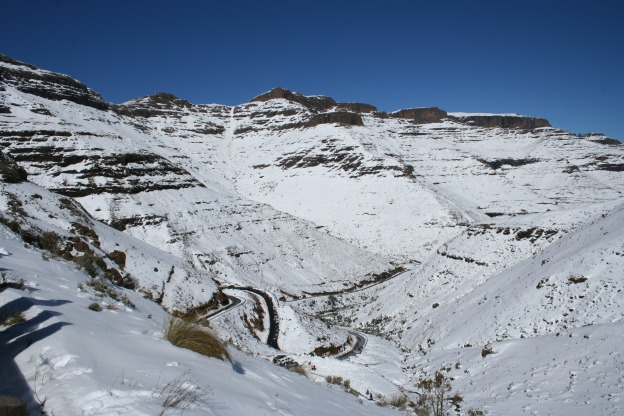
Snow on the Moteng Pass
