= Lake Zerrouka =

Lake in Tizguite, Morocco

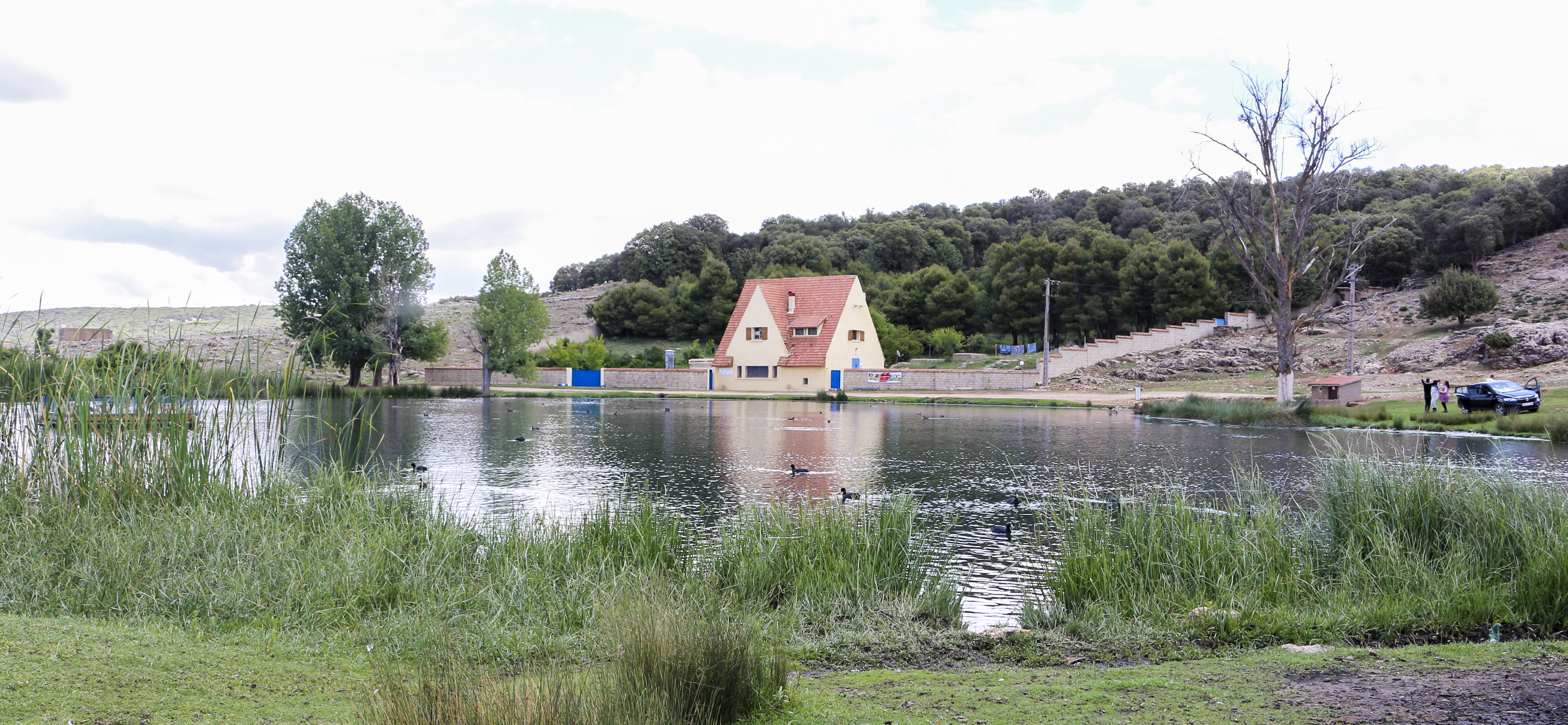
- Interactive map of Lake Zerrouka
- Location: Tizguite
- Coordinates: 33.5461072°N 5.0957533°E
- Type: Lake
- Basin countries: Morocco

Lake Zerrouka is a Moroccan lake situated within the boundaries of the Tizguite commune in Ifrane Province, approximately 1 km (0.62 mi) away from Ifrane. The lake is a popular destination for tourists from various Moroccan towns, offering opportunities for recreation and fishing. The lake is divided into two distinct sections, designated as Lake Zerrouka 1 and Lake Zerrouka 2.

The lake is also a habitat for a variety of bird species, both migratory and resident, including Rock dove, Eurasian collared dove, Common sandpiper, Little egret, Grey heron, Gadwall, Common pochard, Great crested grebe. Additionally, Lake Zerrouka is home to a diverse range of fish species, such as carp, common roach, pike, and rainbow trout. Due to the lake's biodiversity, it is considered a protected area, though since 2023 it has been host to an invasive species Ferrissia californica.

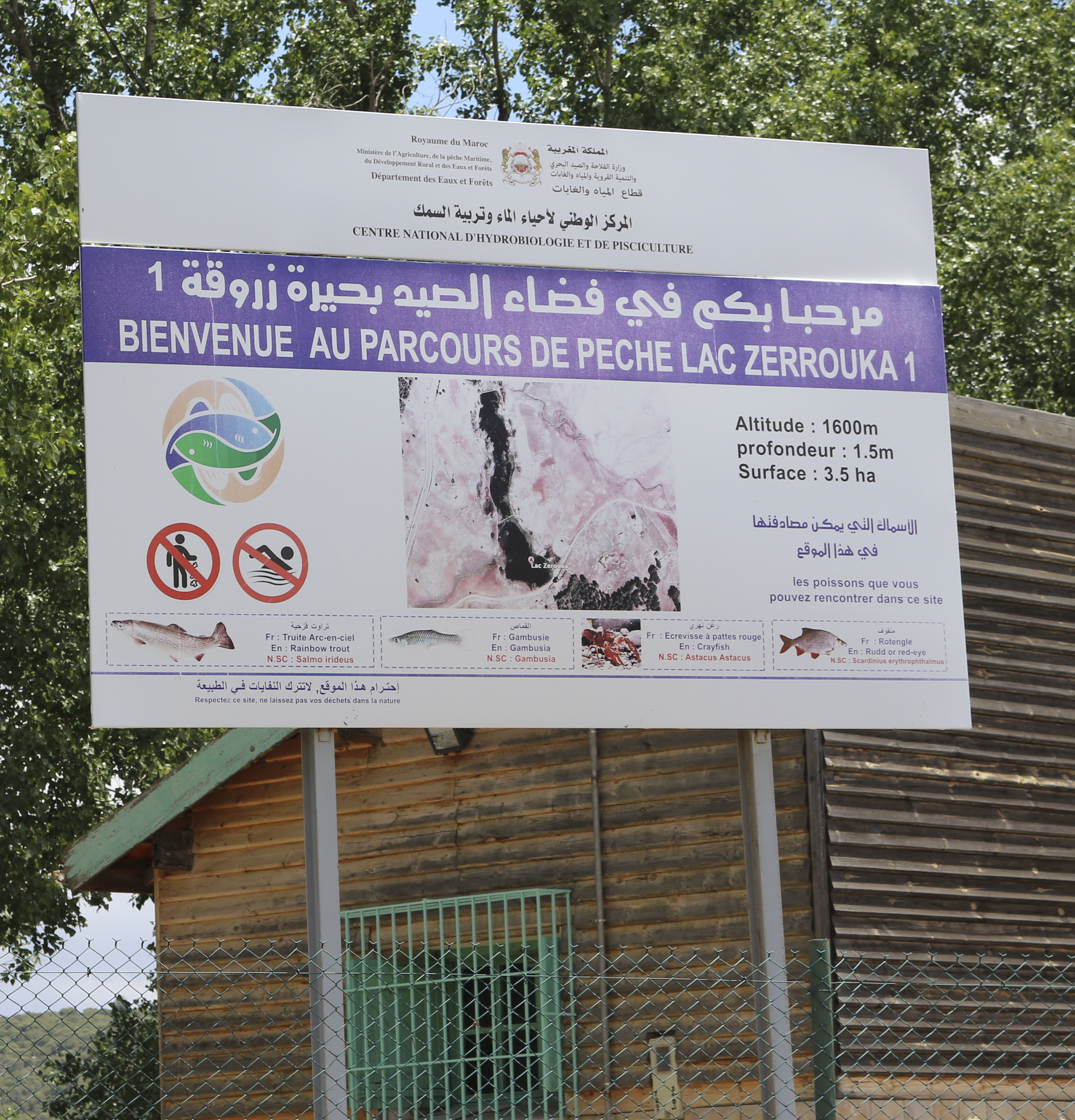
Lake Zerouka

== Ecological Nature ==
Lake Zerrouka is situated at an altitude of 1,600 m (5,200 ft) with a maximum depth of 1.5 m (4 ft 11 in) and an area of 3.5 ha (8.6 acres).

== Photo gallery ==
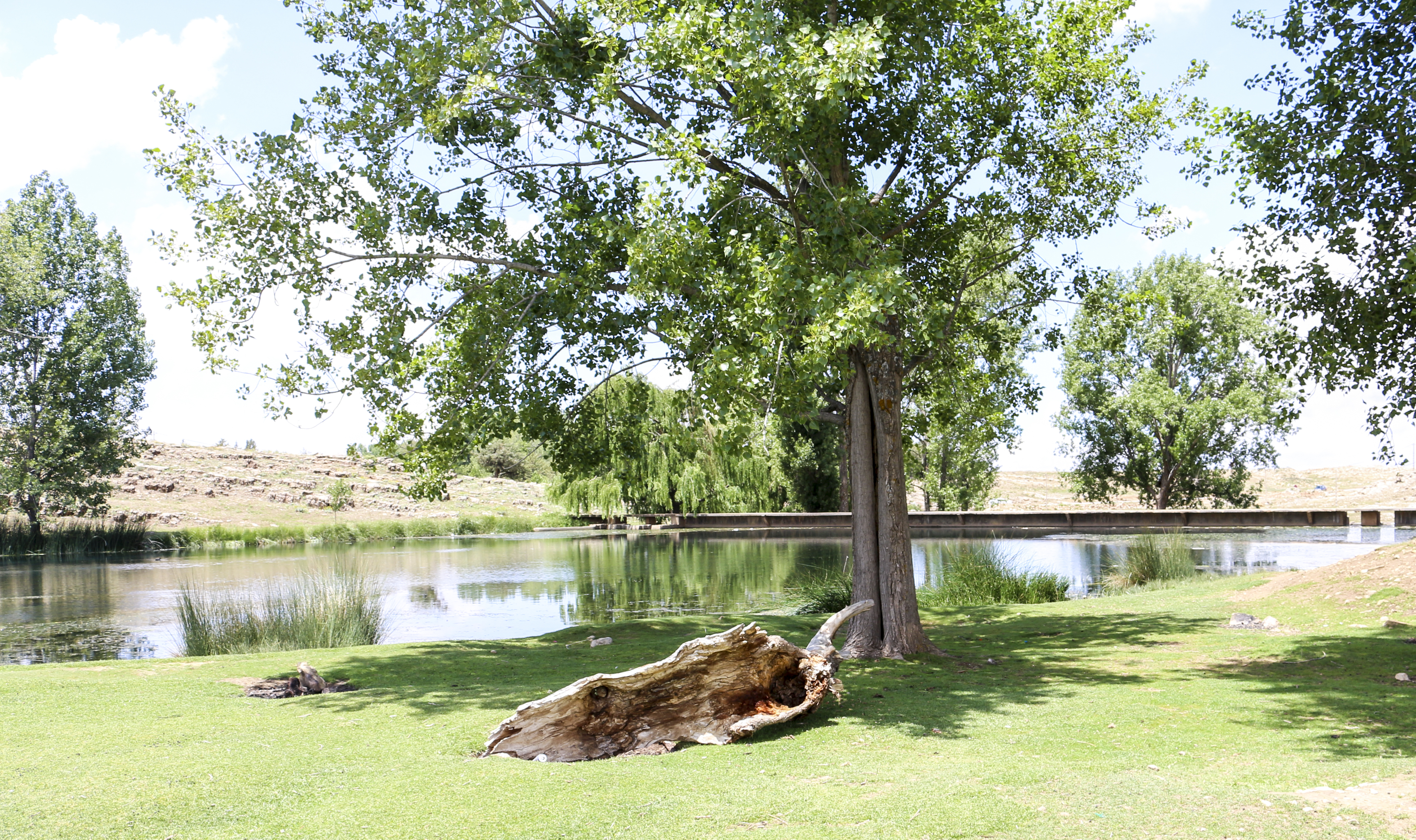

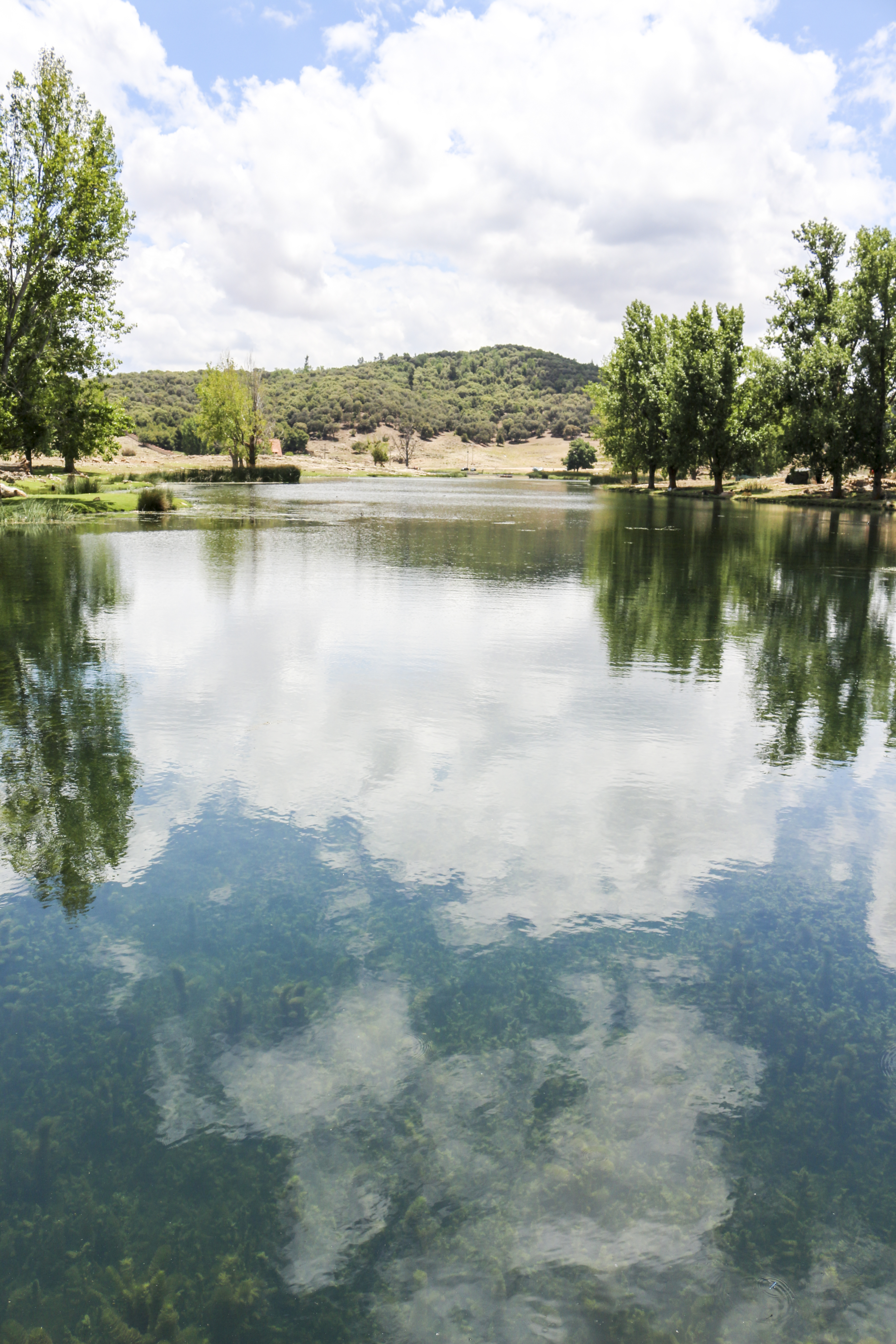

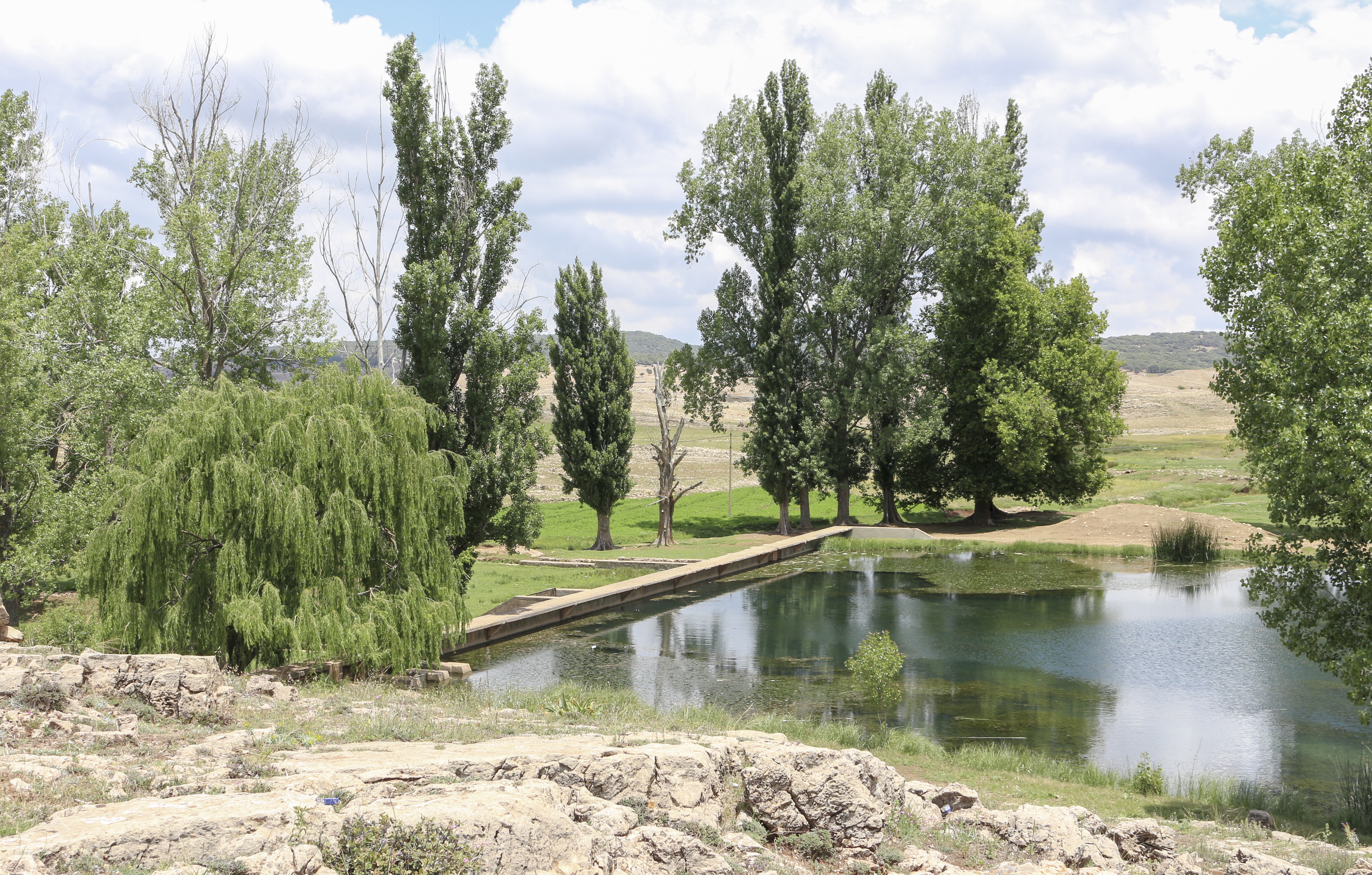

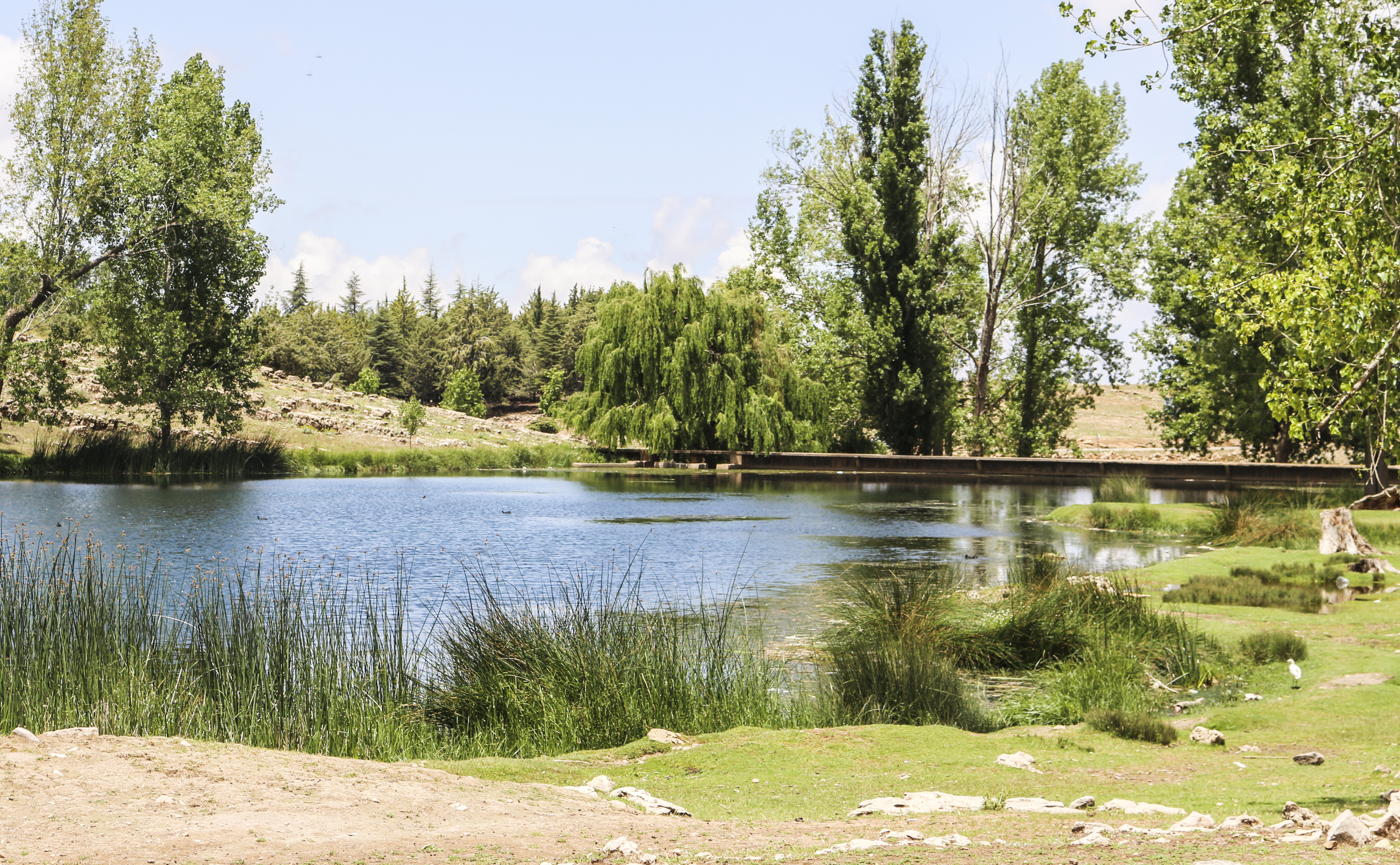

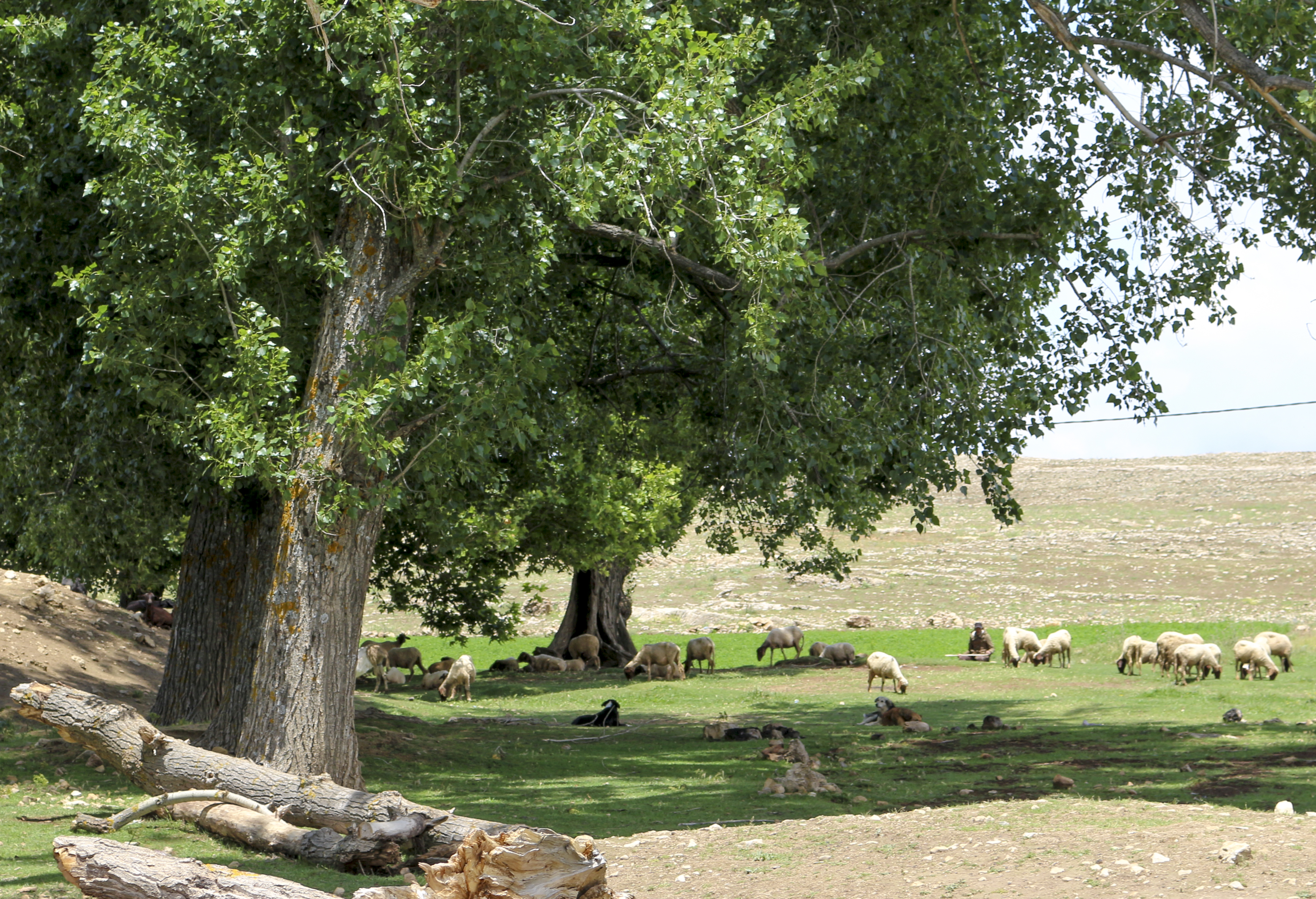

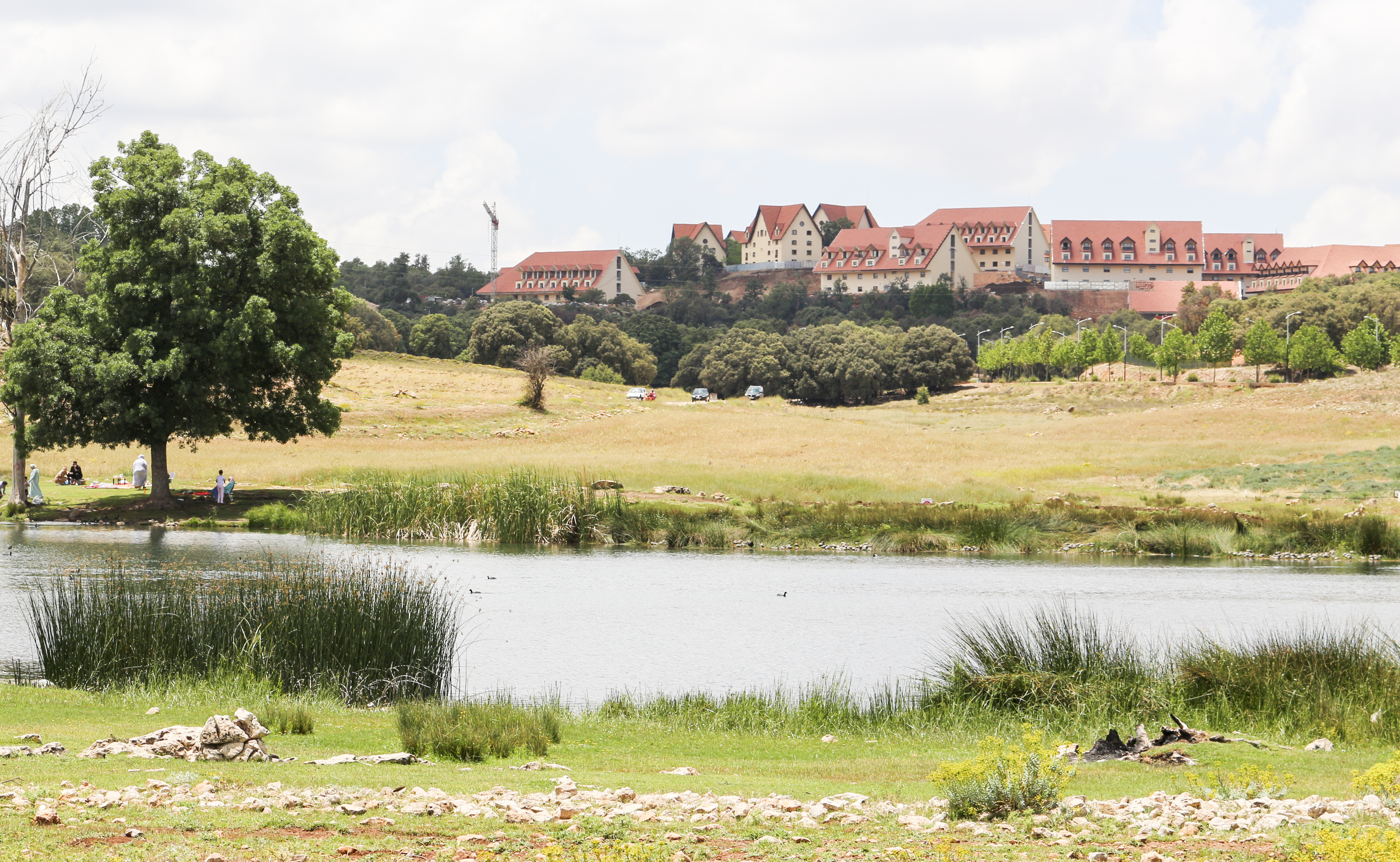

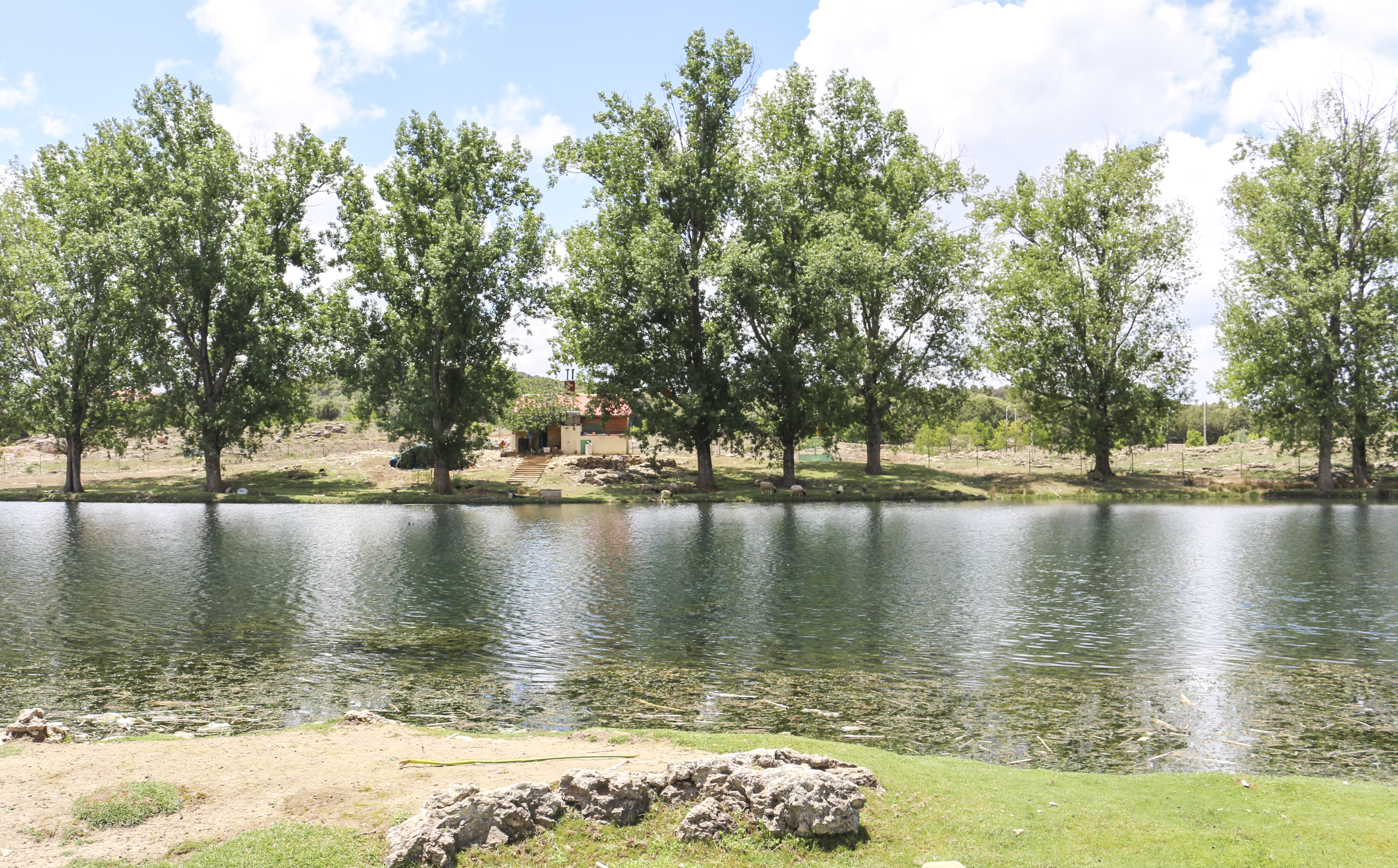

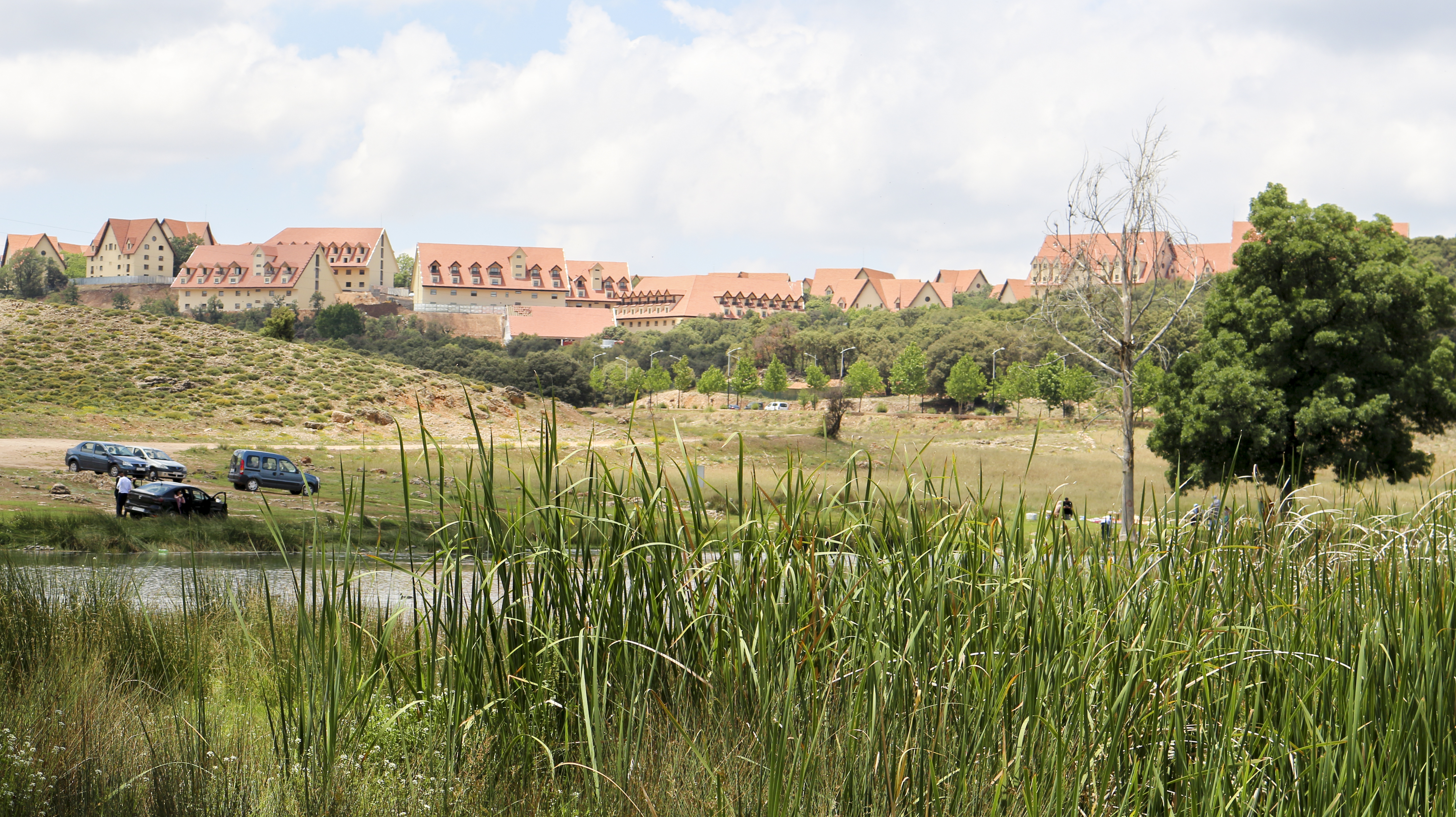

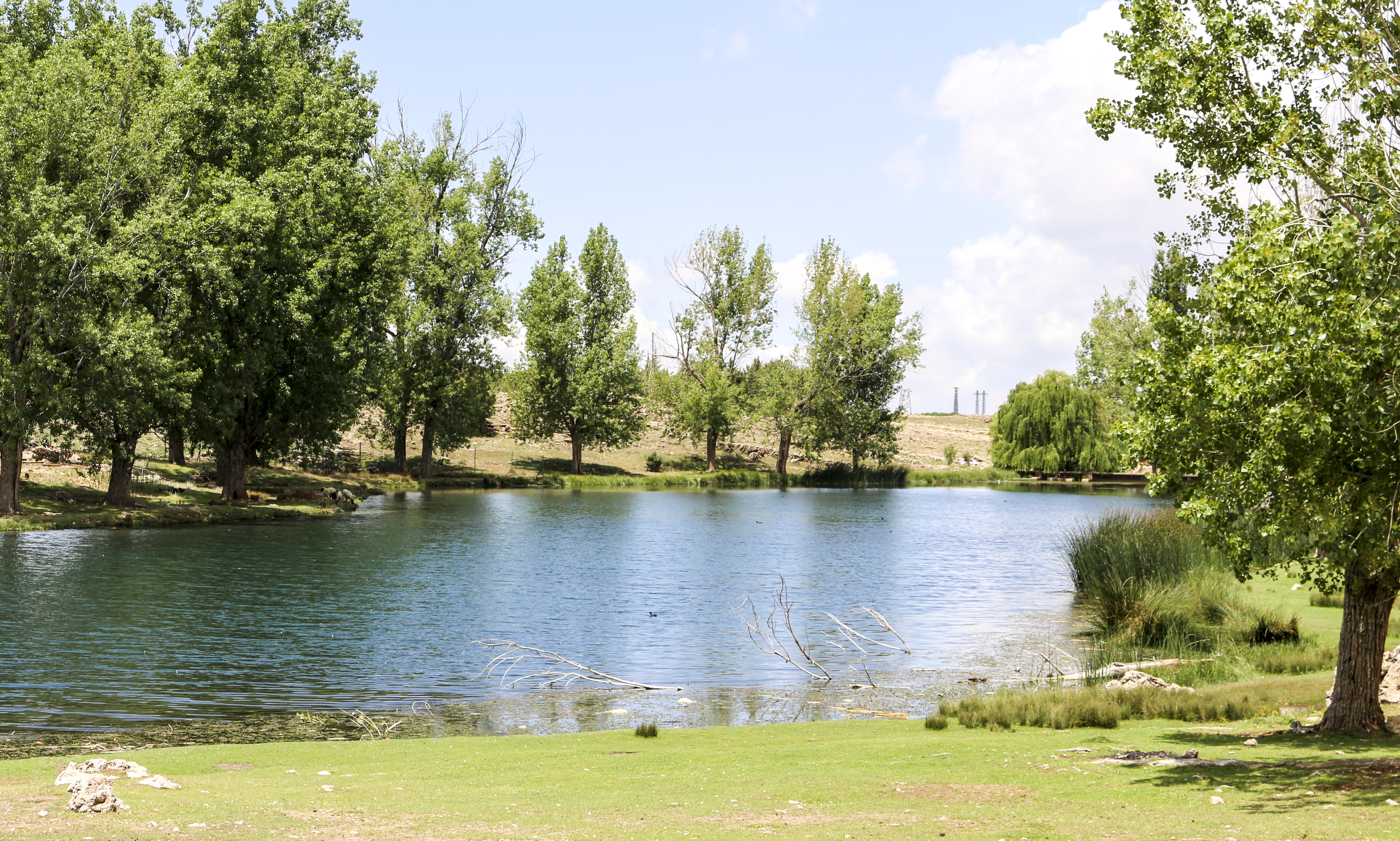

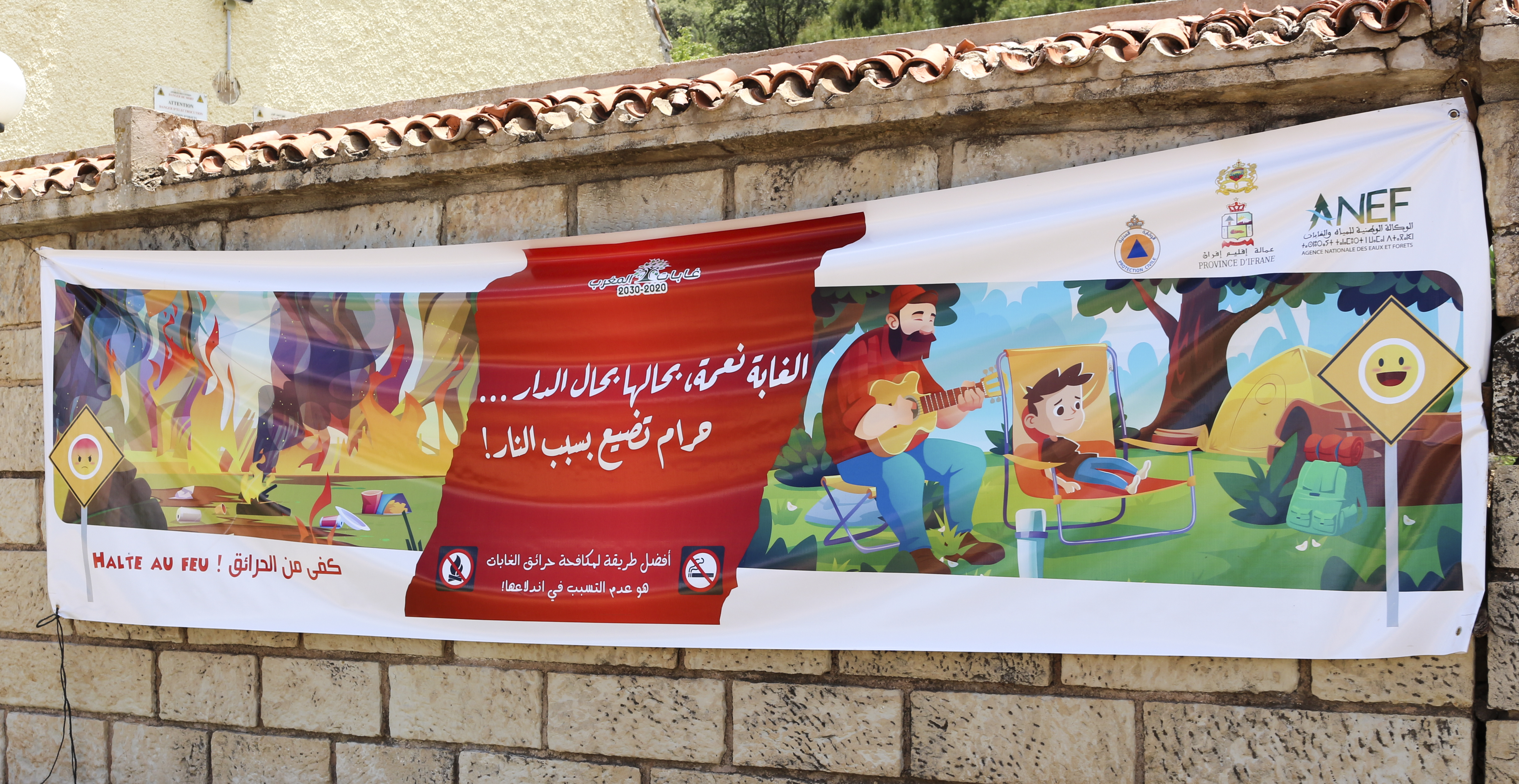

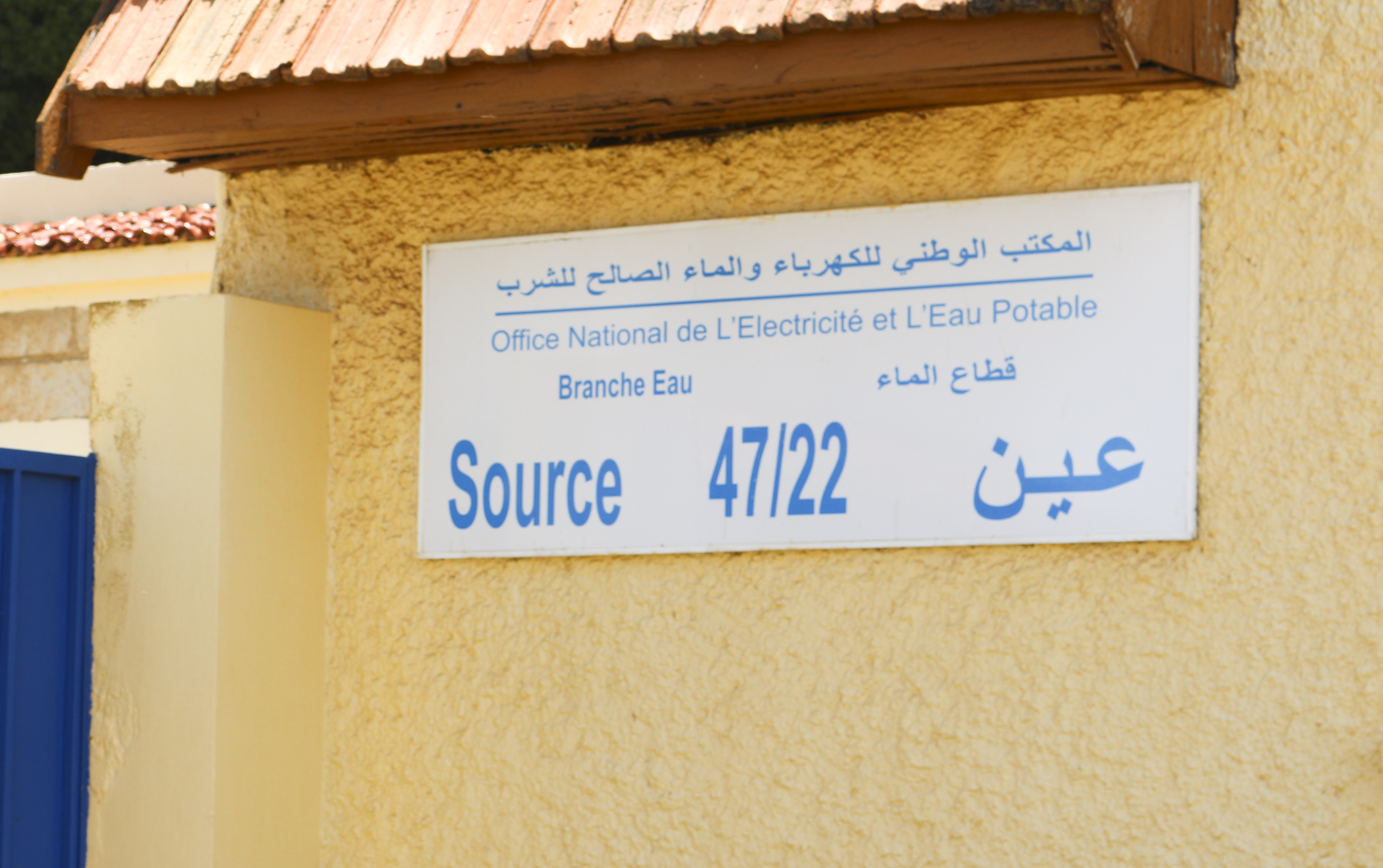

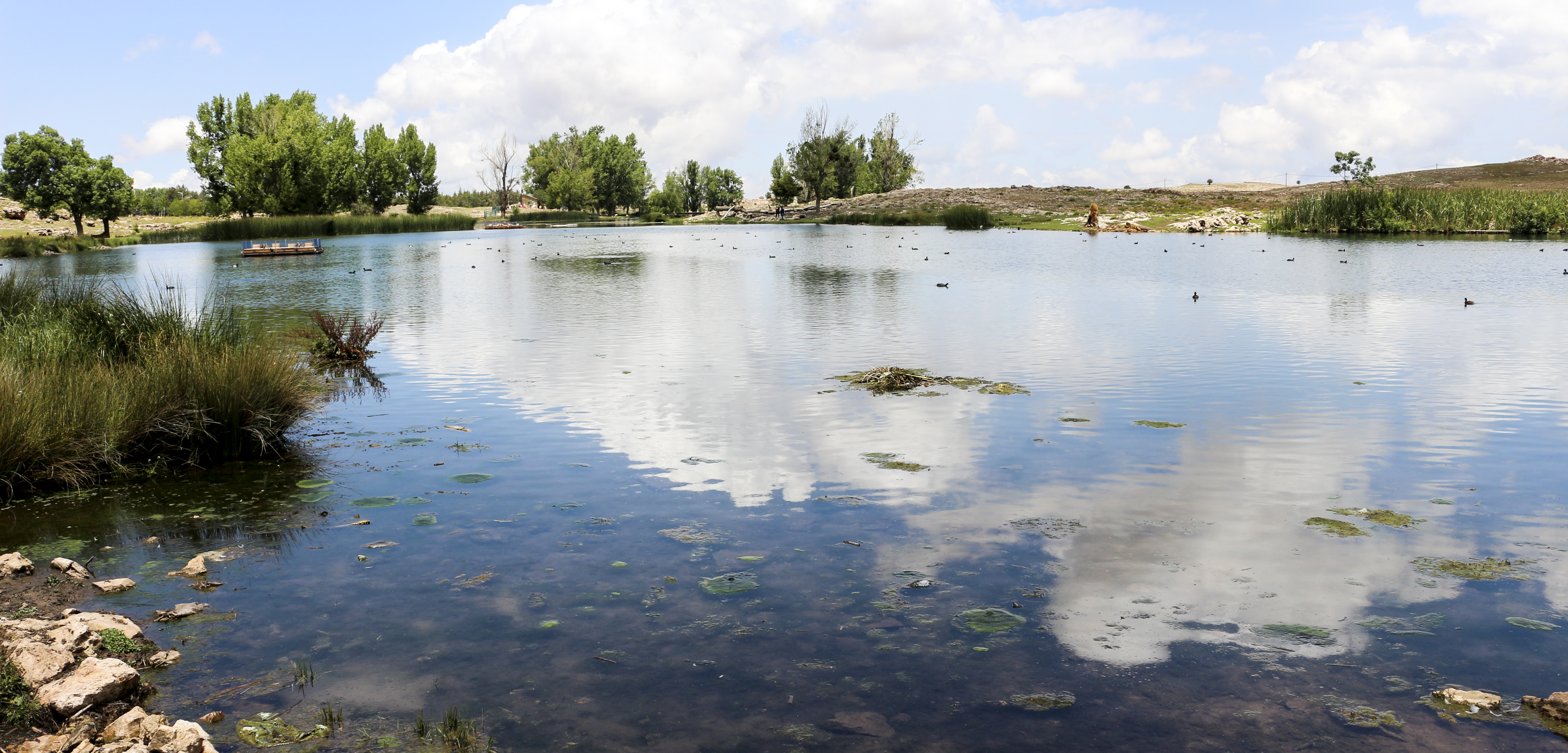

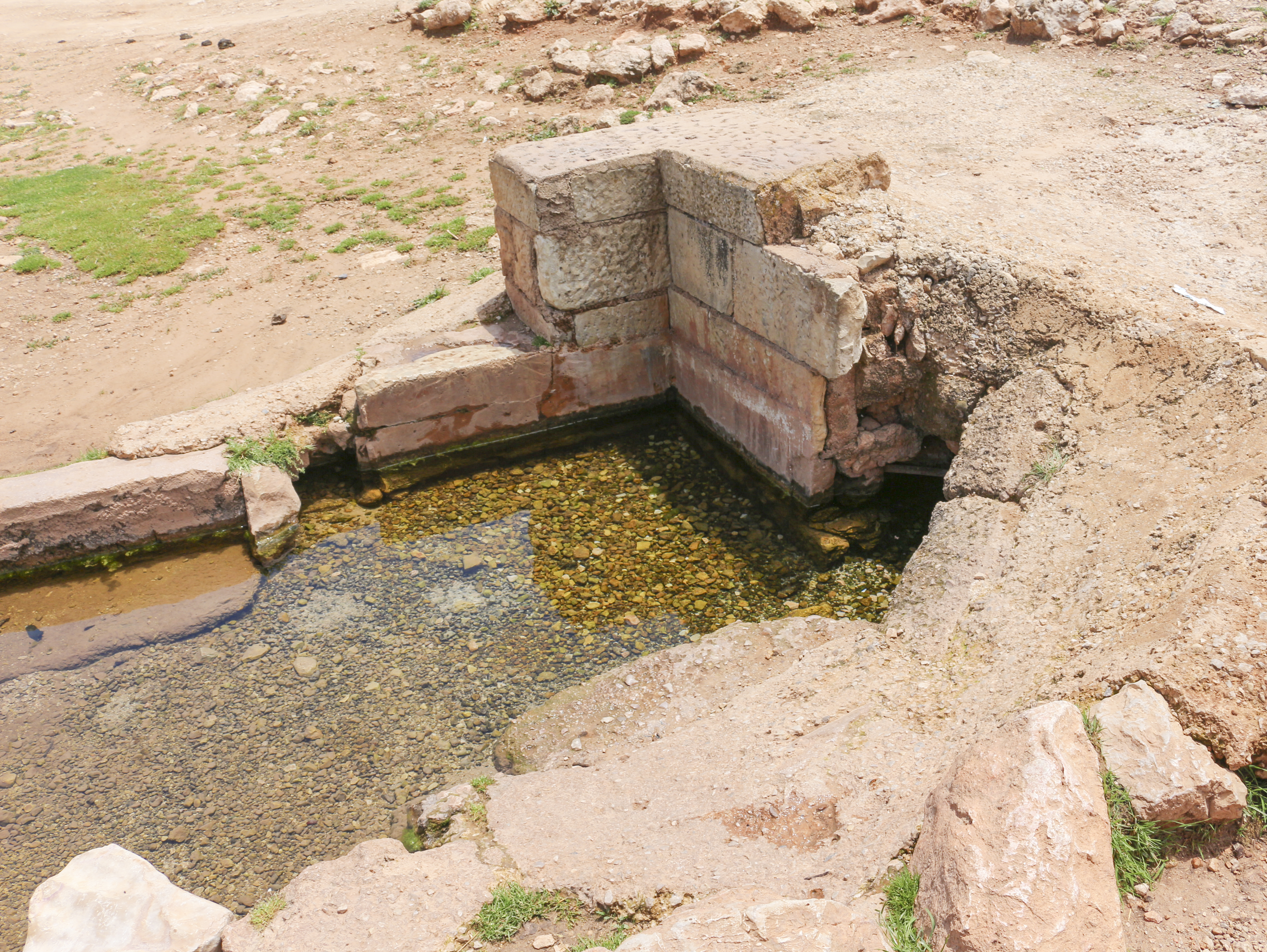

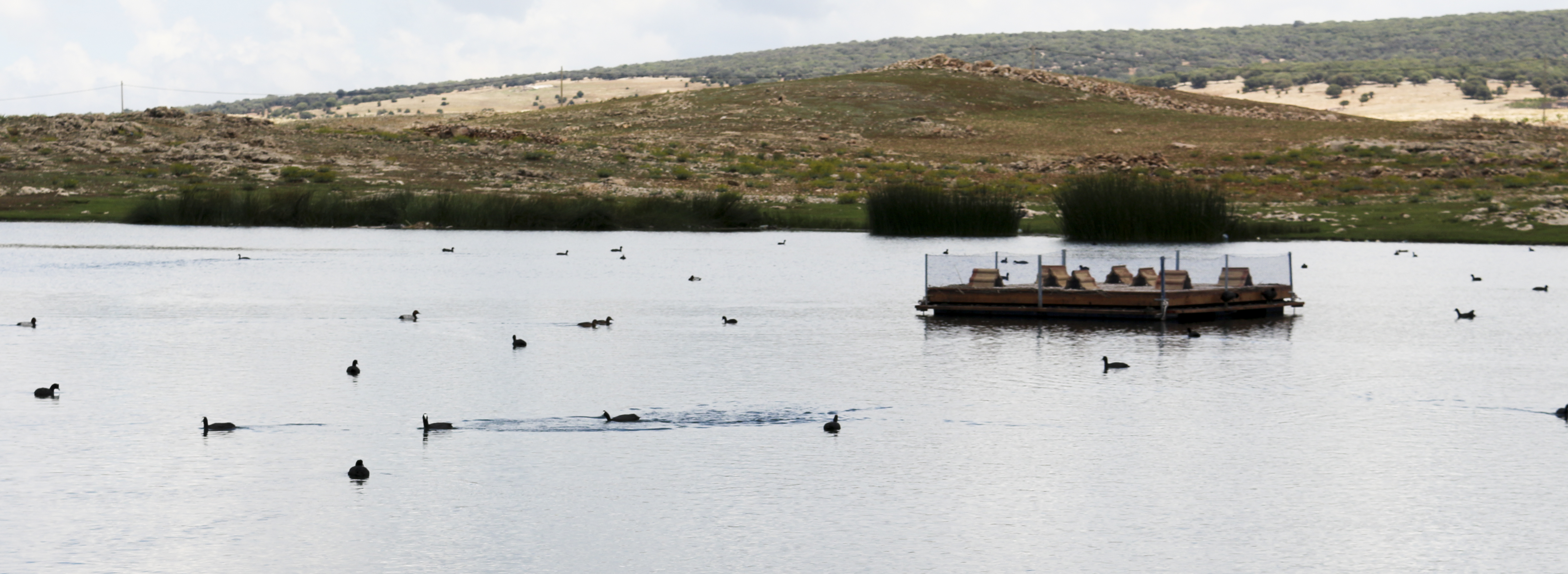

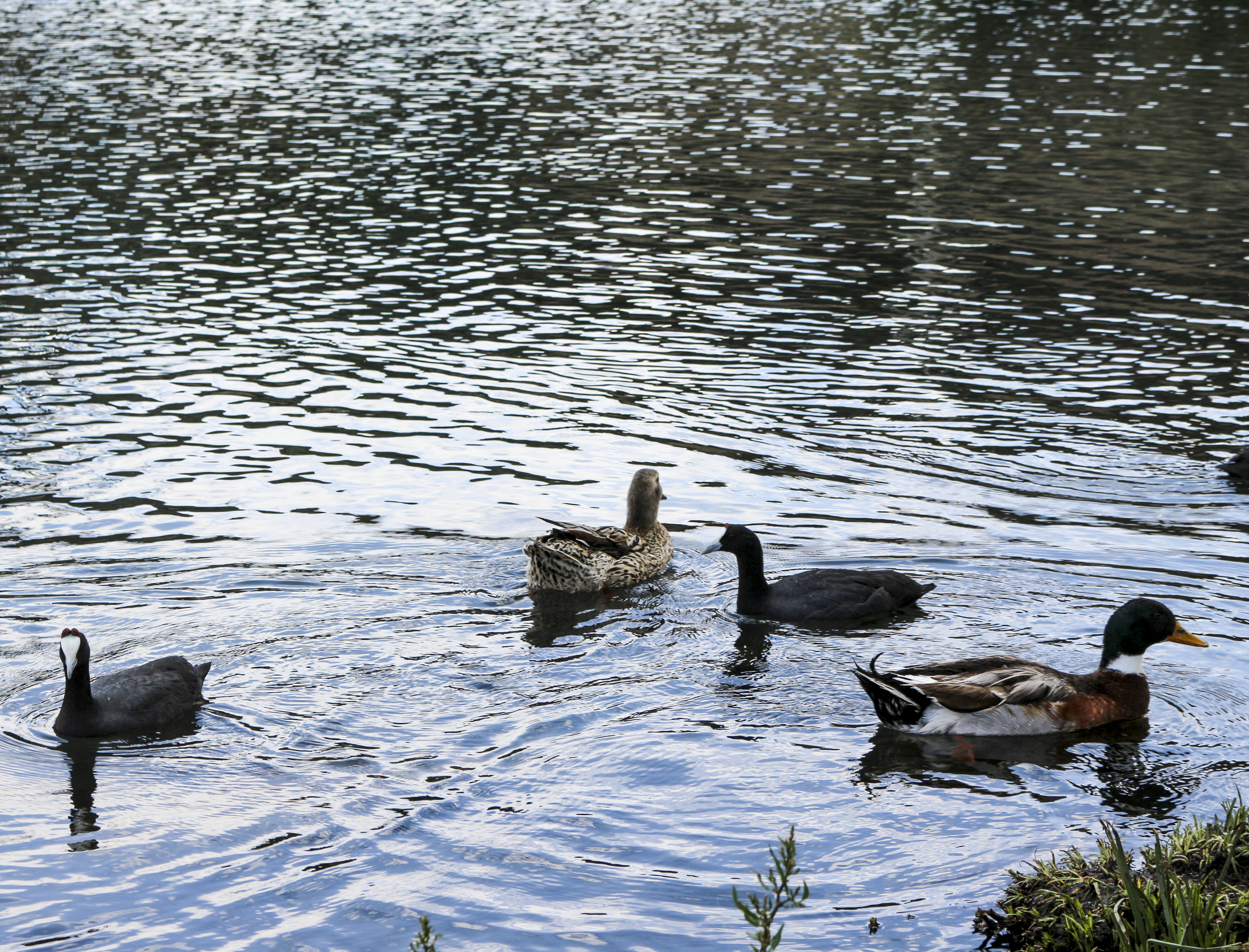
