= Inaouen River =

River in Morocco

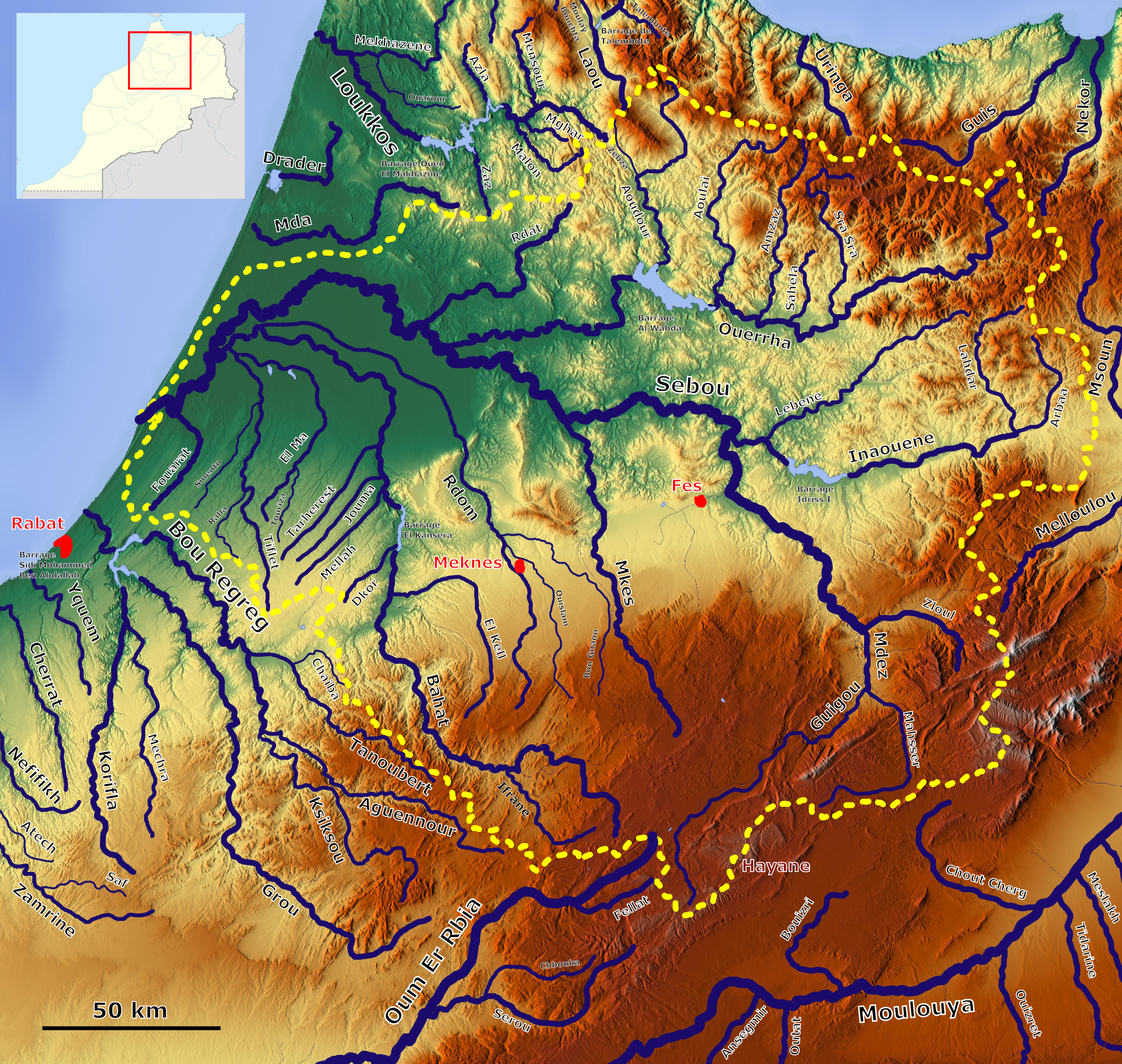
The Sebou River watershed with the oued Inaouen (right center)

The Inaouen River is a watercourse in Morocco. It is a tributary of the Sebou River. The river rises in the Middle Atlas mountain range. A major dam, the Idriss I, was constructed on the Inaouen in 1973.

== Natural history ==
In the upper parts of the watershed within the Middle Atlas is the prehistoric range of the endangered primate Barbary macaque, which prehistorically had a much larger range in North Africa.

== See also ==
- Baht River
- Ouergha River
