= Fez Offensive =

- Part of the Rif War
Date	April–July 1925
Location	Fes and Taza, Morocco
Result	Initial Riffian victory

Belligerents
Republic of the Rif	(France) French Empire

Commanders and leaders
Abd el-Krim	Hubert Lyautey; Marshall Pétain

Strength
Several thousands	April/May:12,000–20,000 reinforcements July: 80,000 reinforcements Total: 300,000 troops

Casualties and losses
Unknown	(France) 6,000 casualties

The Fez offensive was a major military campaign during the later phase of the Rif War between the forces of the Republic of the Rif , led by Abd el-Krim, and the French colonial army in northern Morocco. Beginning in April 1925, Riffian forces crossed into French colonial territory and launched coordinated attacks against a line of French outposts north of fez along the Ouergha River. The offensive initially achieved significant success, overrunning numeours French positions and inflicting heavy casualties while threatening the important cities of Fes and Taza.

== Background ==
The Rif War began in 1921 as an uprising of Berber tribes in northern Morocco against Spanish colonial rule under the leadership of Abd el-Krim. Following several major victories over Spanish forces, including the collapse of Spanish positions in northern Morocco, the Rifian movement consolidated control over much of the Rif region and proclaimed the Republic of the Rif. By the mid-1920s, Abd el-Krim sought to secure supply routes and prevent French authorities in the neighboring French protectorate from restricting trade and material support to the Rifian state. French authorities had begun establishing fortified positions and outposts north of the Ouergha River to contain the Rifian movement. These measures, along with increasing French interference in tribal regions bordering the Spanish zone, heightened tensions between the Rif Republic and the French protectorate. In April 1925, Abd el-Krim ordered a large-scale offensive into the French protectorate, aiming to disrupt French military positions and encourage local tribes to join the rebellion. The operation marked a major escalation of the conflict and expanded the war beyond the Spanish zone into French Morocco.

== Battle ==
The offensive began on 12 April 1925, when several thousand Rifian fighters attacked the French defensive line along the Ouergha River. French positions were caught off guard by the scale and coordination of the attacks. Within weeks, Rifian forces had overrun dozens of French outposts and forced French troops to withdraw from several forward positions. Rifian fighters employed mobile tactics and coordinated assaults on isolated garrisons, often supported by local tribal forces that joined the uprising. In many areas the French defensive network collapsed as isolated posts were captured or abandoned. During the first phase of the offensive, more than forty French positions were reportedly destroyed or evacuated. The advance pushed French forces back toward the interior and brought Rifian fighters close to the strategic cities of Fez and Taza, both major administrative and military centers. Fighting occurred along a broad front as the French attempted to stabilize their lines and prevent the collapse of their defensive system in northern Morocco.

== Aftermath ==
The Fez offensive marked a turning point in the Rif War. Although it demonstrated the military strength of the Rifian forces and threatened French control of Morocco, the attack also forced France to fully commit to the conflict. In response to the crisis, France deployed large reinforcements to Morocco and coordinated military operations with Spain, which had been fighting the Rif Republic since 1921. Later in 1925 the two colonial powers launched a major joint offensive, including a large Spanish amphibious landing at Alhucemas Bay and a simultaneous French advance from the south.
