= El Kansera Dam =

Dam in Morocco

EL Kansera
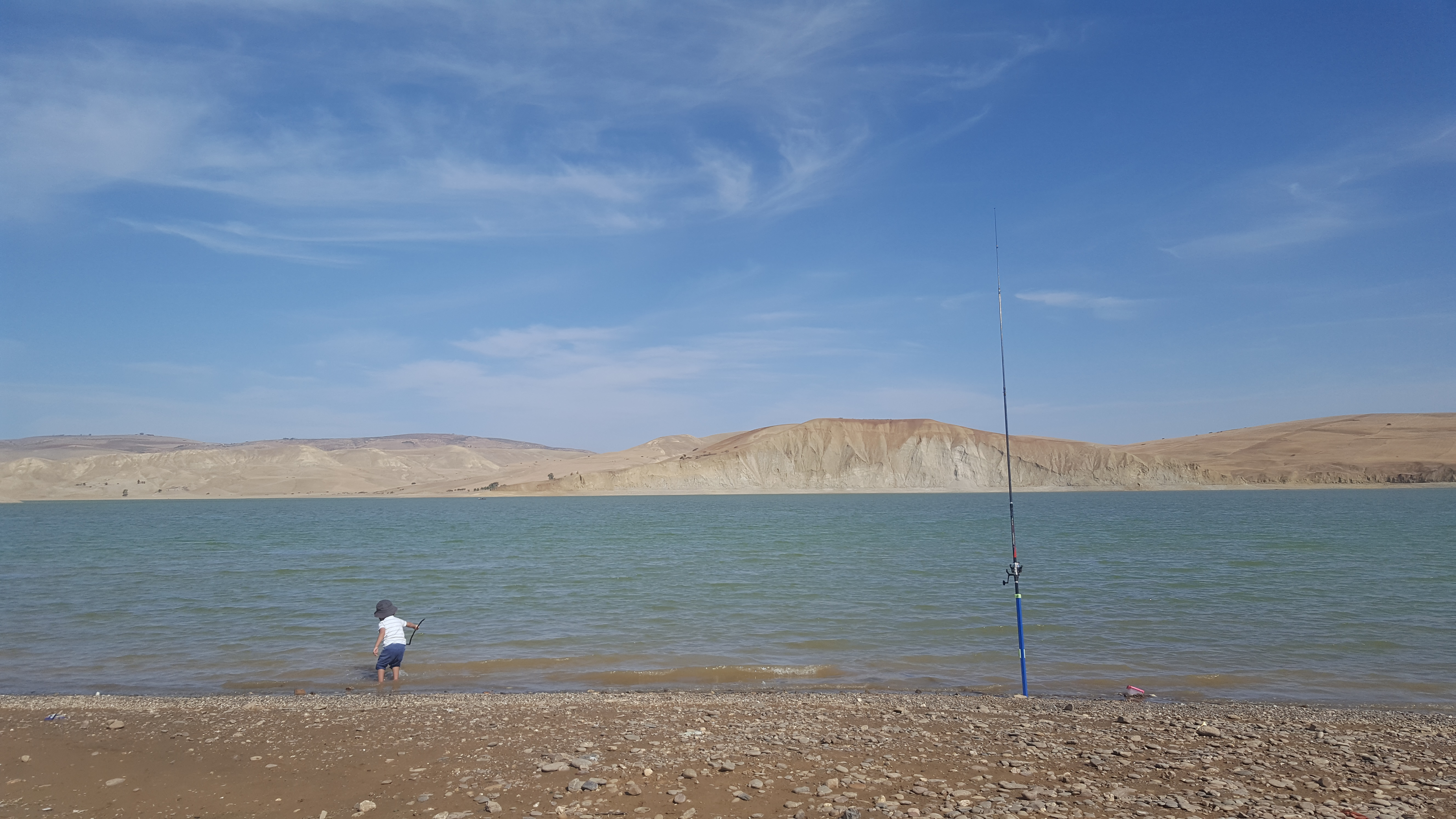
- Reservoir al Kansara
- Interactive map of EL Kansera
- Country: Morocco
- Coordinates: 34.041583°N 5.907346°W
- Purpose: Irrigation water storage
- Construction began: 1927
- Opening date: 1935

Dam and spillways
- Height: 68 m (223 ft)

Reservoir
- Total capacity: 227×10^{6} m^{3} (184,000 acre⋅ft)
- Catchment area: 4,500 km^{2} (1,700 sq mi)

Power Station
- Operator: Office National de L'Electricite (ONE)
- Commission date: 1946
- Turbines: 1 x 8.3 MW (11,100 hp) Francis-type
- Installed capacity: 8.3 MW

EL Kansera is an irrigation storage dam in Morocco.

== Location ==
El Kansera is the oldest irrigation storage dam in Morocco. It lies northwest of the city of Meknes and about 20 kilometres (12 mi) south of Sidi Slimane, upstream from Dar bel Amri. The dam impounds the Oued Beht (or Beth), the last major tributary of the Sebou River before its mouth. The watershed that supplies the dam has an area of 4,500 square kilometres (1,700 sq mi). The climate is temperate, and average annual rainfall is 620 millimetres (24 in).

The site of the dam was a deep, narrow gorge that the Beth had cut through the limestone bordering on the lowlands. Winter floods of the Beth had created large merdjas on the Sebou's left bank, which would be ideal for cultivation once irrigation water was available.

== Construction ==
At first the colonial agriculture and public works administrations opposed construction of this and other dams, but the main settlers, led by Gaston Lebault, pushed the project forward. When governor-general Théodore Steeg arrived in 1925, known as the "water governor", the pace accelerated. El Kansera was built between 1927 and 1935. In 1928 Steeg's administration created a new colonization zone ("perimeter") located between Petitjean and Sidi Slimane. The land was taken from the Cherardas, who were moved to less productive areas. The new perimeter was sited where water from the dam could be used in irrigation.

The main construction work was undertaken between 1931 and 1934. The dam was built by Société Générale d'Enterprises, a French company. François de Pierrefeu was the prime contractor. Henri Prost (1874-1959) was the architect for the power station, which was completed in 1934. The dam was 51 metres (167 ft) high, with a storage capacity of 225,000,000 cubic metres (7.9×10^{9} cu ft). It would control flooding of the Beht and irrigate 30,000 hectares (74,000 acres) of fertile land in the Rharb plain. The hydroelectric plant at the base would generate 13 million KWh annually. The concrete structure was built on calcareous marl, which caused great difficulty in construction.

== Later development ==
The government did not plan ahead for the way the irrigation water would be used. World War II (1939-1945) caused further delays in development. As of 1953 only 10,000 hectares (25,000 acres) of land was in fact being irrigated since the distribution system was still incomplete. This lack of planning is a serious problem in a region where silting imposes a finite lifespan on any storage dam. The irrigated region was almost entirely in the hands of the colonists. By 1969 28,000 hectares (69,000 acres) were being irrigated.

The dam was raised by 6 metres (20 ft) in 1968, which increased the volume of the reservoir to 297,000,000 cubic metres (1.05×10^{10} cu ft). This compensated for silting, improved flood control, increased the irrigated area by 2,700 hectares (6,700 acres) and allowed for an increase in electricity production to 33 million kWh annually. The job was complicated by the difficulty of conducting deep excavation near the foundation and problems with making the new concrete bond to the old. The design included addition of 77 steel cables under a tension of 240 tonnes each. Soon after completion, in February 1969 it withstood a major flood and a simultaneous earthquake.

== See also ==
- List of power stations in Morocco
