= Sebou =

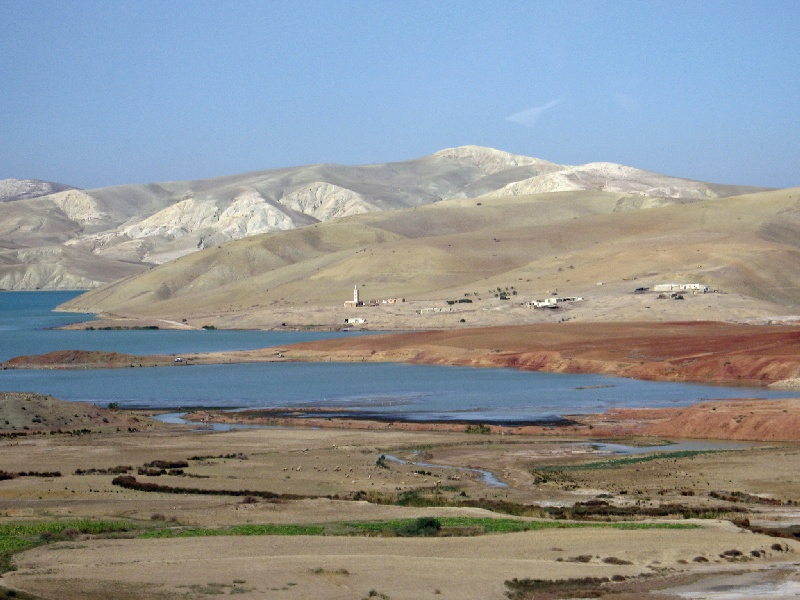

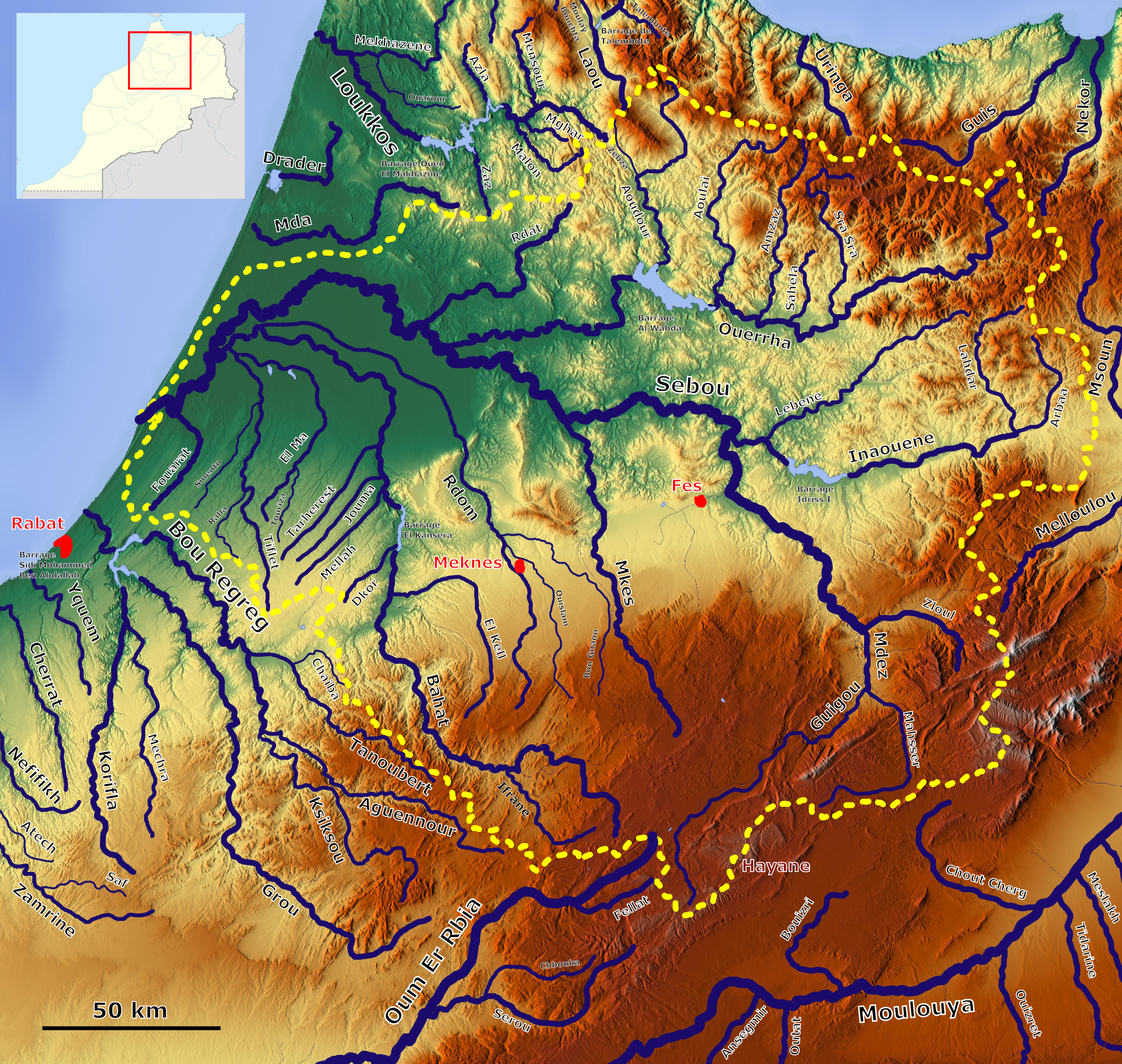
- Sebou River course and major tributaries, with the Basin within the yellow dotted line
- Native name: Arabic: واد سبو; Standard Moroccan Tamazight: ⴰⵙⵉⴼ ⵏ ⵙⴱⵓ

Location
- Country: Morocco

Physical characteristics
- Source
  - location: Middle Atlas
- Mouth
  - location: Atlantic Ocean
- Length: 496 km (308 mi)
- Discharge
  - average: 137 m^{3}/s (4,800 cu ft/s)

The Sebou (Standard Moroccan Tamazight: ⴰⵙⵉⴼ ⵏ ⵙⴱⵓ; Arabic: واد سبو) is a river in northern Morocco. At its source in the Middle Atlas mountains it is known as the Guigou river (Central Atlas Tamazight: ⴰⵙⵉⴼ ⵏ ⴳⵉⴳⵓ). The river is 496 kilometers long and has an average water flow of 137 m^{3}/s, which makes it the 2nd largest North African river by volume.

It passes near Fes, and discharges to the Atlantic Ocean at Mehdya. Sebou is navigable for only 16 km as far as the city of Kenitra, which has the only river port in Morocco.

Its most important tributaries are the Ouergha River, Baht River and Inaouen River. The river supports irrigation in Morocco's most fertile region: the Gharb.

== History ==
Sebou was known in antiquity as Sububus. Pliny the Elder states that it was "magnificus et navigabilis" (grand and navigable), flowing near the towns of Banasa (near the city of Mechra Bel Ksiri) and Thamusida.

There is scant historical reference to the Sebou being used for navigation after the Islamic conquest; nevertheless, its river mouth was an important harbor and shipyard in the Almohad period.

In 1669–1670, the Alaouite sultan Moulay Rashid built a bridge over the river near Fes which has been preserved today.

During the precolonial period, the Sebou was renowned for its Twait shad which was highly prized by the people of Fez, but due to pollution the shad became extinct on the Sebou.

In the first years of the French protectorate an expedition successfully navigated the Sebou from Sidi Ali Ben Sliman to the city of Fez on a small steam boat Le Dantec.

=== Water Highway project ===
In response to regional water stress and prolonged drought, Morocco constructed a major $728 million initiative known as the "Water Highway" to redirect surplus water from the Sebou River basin toward the country's central and southern urban centers. As part of this project, a diversion dam and key pumping facilities were established north of Kenitra. The installation captures the surplus flow of the Sebou River before it empties into the Atlantic Ocean, the water is subsequently treated before being transported through a 67 kilometres (42 mi) underground canal to supply Rabat and Casablanca. Inaugurated August 2024, The system successfully averted a major drinking water crisis for the roughly 12 million residents of the Rabat-Salé-Kénitra and Casablanca-Settat regions that had faced shortages when local reservoirs neared depletion. by early March 2025, the project had already supplied over 700 million cubic meters of drinking water to these urban areas.

== Environmental issues ==
A number of water pollutants enter the Sebou River, notably including pesticides and fertilisers from agricultural runoff and untreated sewage from towns along the river.

== See also ==
- Idriss I (dam)
