= Idriss I Dam =

Dam in Taza, Morocco

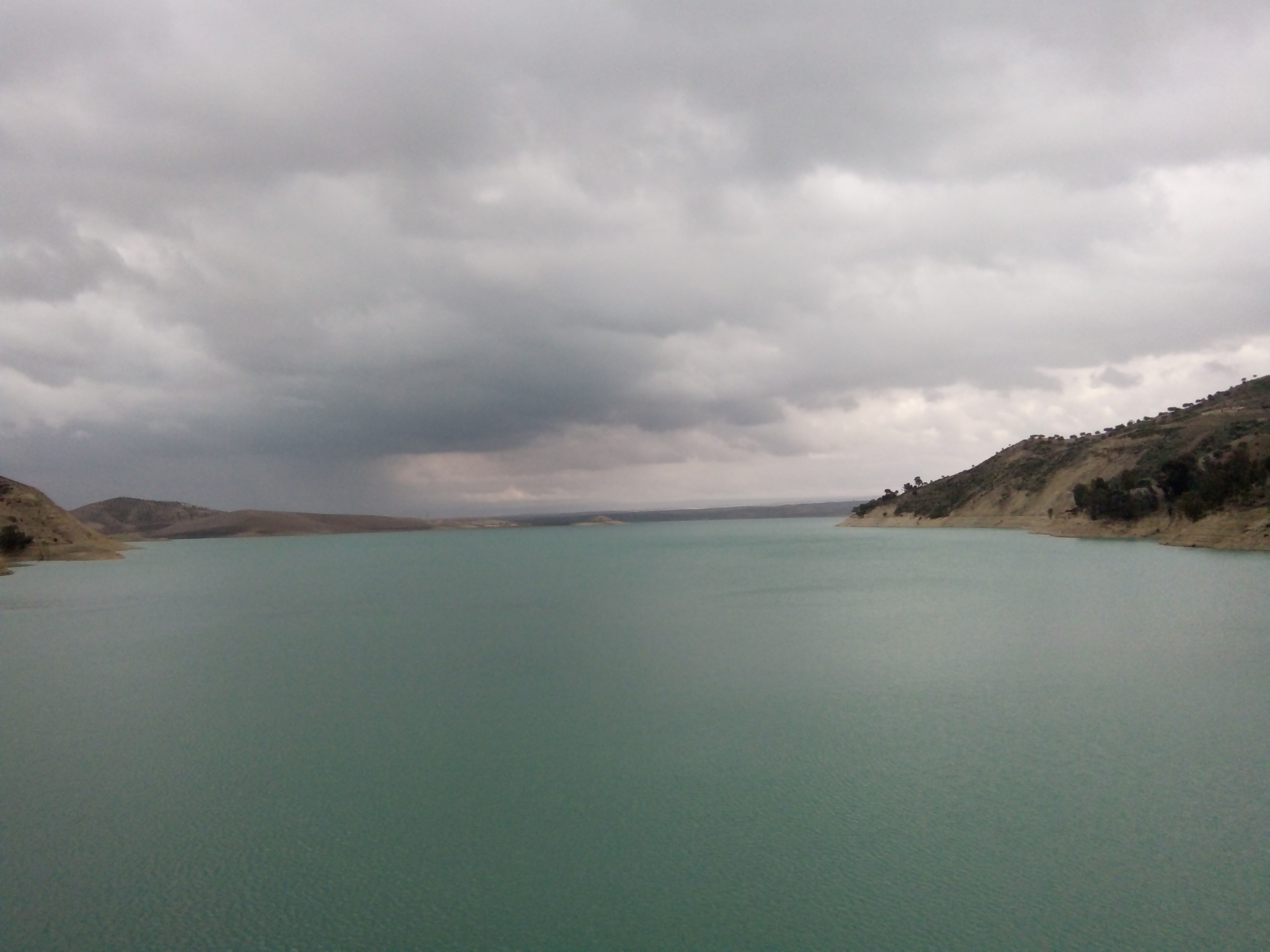
- Reservoir
- Interactive map of Idriss I Dam
- Official name: Barrage Idriss I
- Country: Morocco
- Location: Taounate Province
- Coordinates: 34°09′41″N 04°44′57″W
- Status: Operational
- Opening date: 1973
- Owner: Office National de L'Electricite (ONE)

Dam and spillways
- Type of dam: Gravity
- Impounds: Inaouen River
- Height: 72 m (236 ft)
- Length: 447 m (1,467 ft)
- Dam volume: 450,000 m^{3} (16,000,000 cu ft)

Reservoir
- Total capacity: 1,186×10^{6} m^{3} (962,000 acre⋅ft)
- Catchment area: 3,300 km^{2} (1,300 sq mi)

Power Station
- Commission date: 1978
- Turbines: 2 x 20 MW (27,000 hp) Kaplan-type
- Installed capacity: 40 MW (54,000 hp)
- Annual generation: 66 GWh (240 TJ)

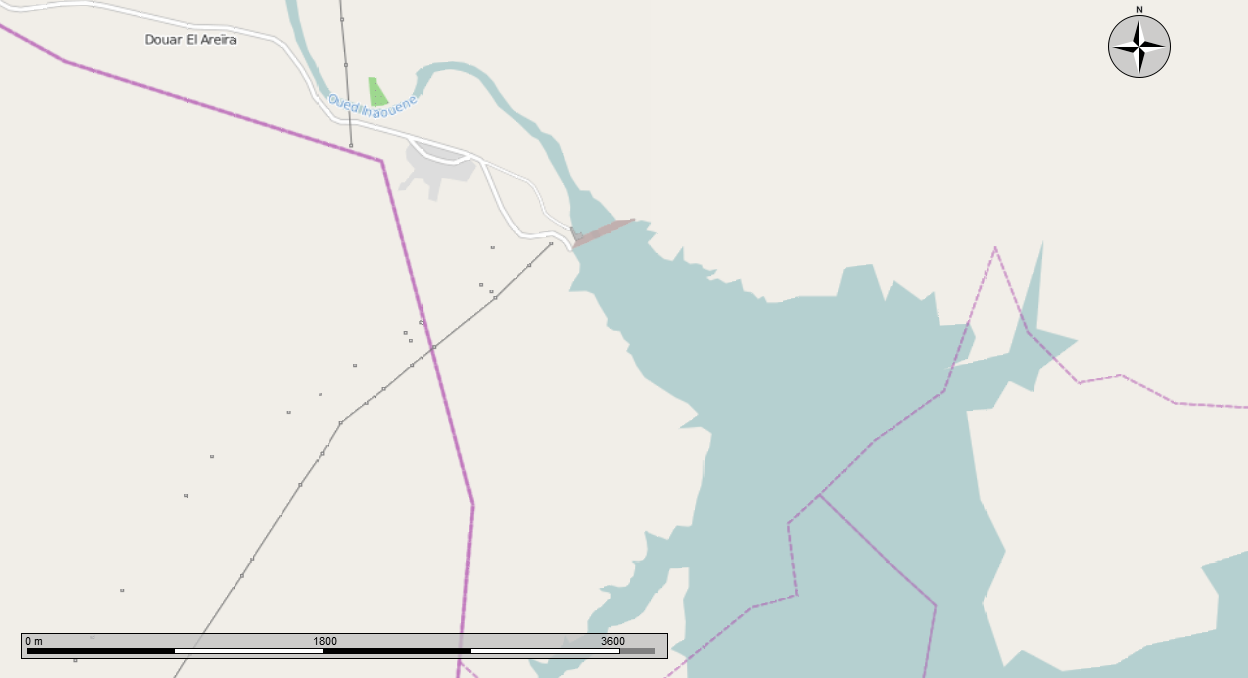
Map of the dam, located at the upper left.

The Idriss I Dam, also known as the Idriss the First Dam, is a gravity dam on the Inaouen River, a tributary of the Sebou River. The dam is situated in the Gharb Basin and is located 27 kilometres (17 mi) northeast of Fes in Taza and Taounate Province, Morocco. The dam serves to provide irrigation water for 72,300 hectares (179,000 acres) of land and its power plant generates 66 GWh of electricity annually. It is named after Idriss I. It has faced criticism since it failed to deliver irrigation to the projected number of acres and it has also denied water use to historical downstream agricultural and residential users.

== Environmental issues ==
A number of water pollutants enter the Sebou River and its tributaries, notably including pesticides and fertilisers from agricultural runoff and untreated sewage from towns along the river. In the upper parts of the watershed within the Middle Atlas is the prehistoric range of the endangered primate Barbary macaque, which animal prehistorically had a much larger range in North Africa.

== See also ==
- List of power stations in Morocco

== Bibliography ==
- Allan M. Findlay. 1994. The Arab world
- C. Michael Hogan. 2008. Barbary Macaque: Macaca sylvanus, GlobalTwitcher.com
- Michele L. Thieme. 2005. Freshwater ecoregions of Africa and Madagascar: a conservation assessment 431 pages
