= Water crisis in the Democratic Republic of the Congo =

Water crisis

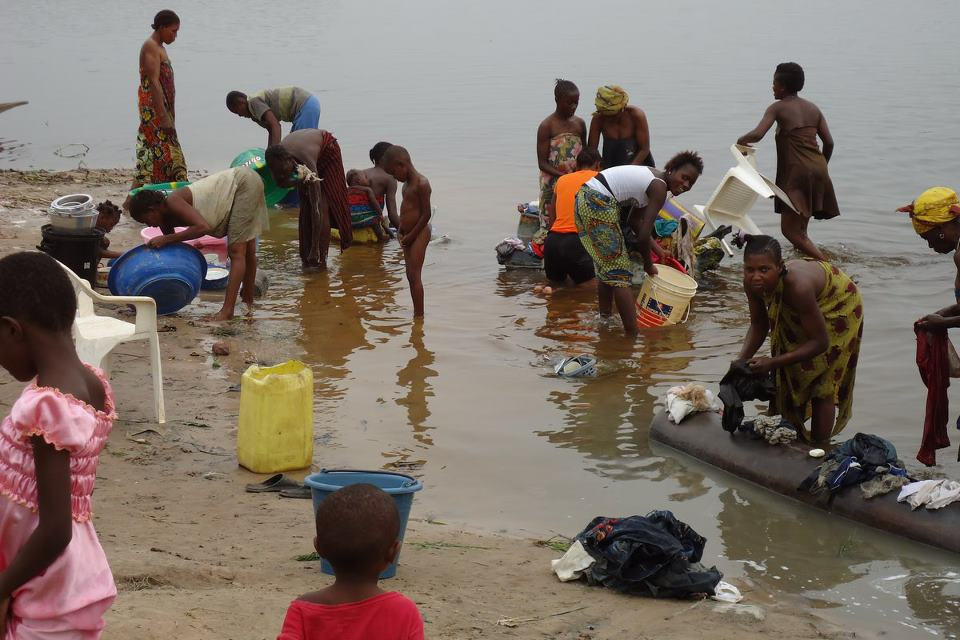
Congo River - source of drinking water, but also threat to public health

Although the Democratic Republic of the Congo (DRC) has Africa's largest freshwater resources, it is suffering from an acute drinking water supply crisis. The DRC has one of the lowest rates of access to clean drinking water in Sub-Saharan Africa and the world. Only 46 percent of the population had access to an improved drinking water source in 2012. Furthermore, the sanitation coverage was estimated at only 31 percent in 2012. Up to date and accurate information on water supply and sanitation services in the DRC is scarce. As a result of inadequate water supply and sanitation services, many inhabitants are suffering from waterborne diseases, including diarrhoea, typhoid, and cholera.

Location of the Democratic Republic of the Congo in Africa

The current water crisis is a result of the deteriorated state of the water infrastructure due to underinvestment in the water sector and conflict-related destruction as well as the rapid growth of the population, which was estimated at 4 percent in urban areas and 2.5 percent in rural areas by the World Bank in 2009. Overall, the DRC's water supply and sanitation sector is characterized by several overlapping and conflicting institutional jurisdictions. Therefore, the water crisis in the DRC can be categorized as an economic water scarcity problem, hindering development in the country. Article 48 of the 2006 Constitution of the DRC recognizes the human right to water. The rehabilitation and development of the water sector is a priority to which the national government committed itself in the Growth and Poverty Reduction Strategies and to which it agreed as part of the international framework of the UN Millennium Development Goals.

== Freshwater resources and water supply ==
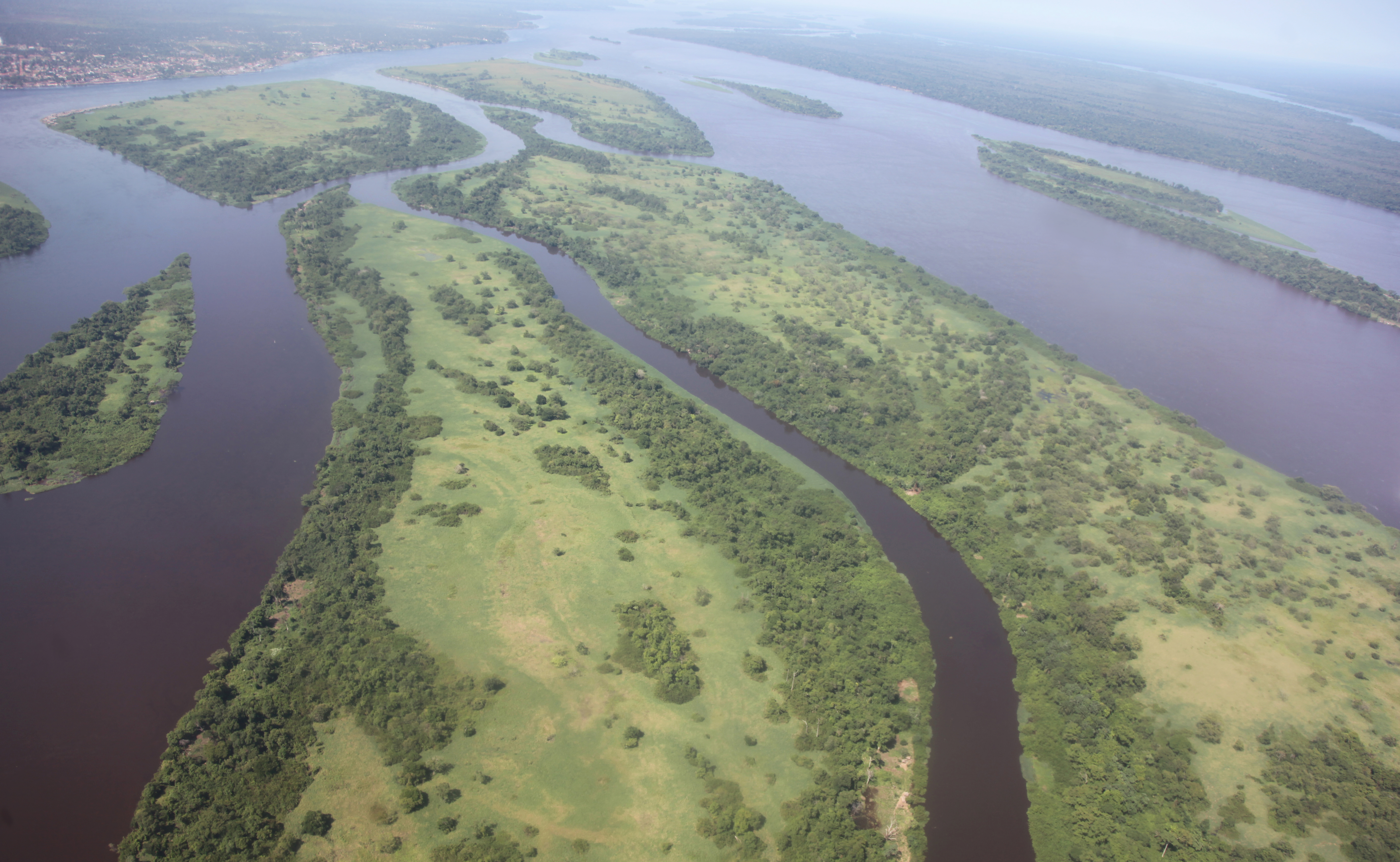
Aerial view of the Congo River

The DRC is the most water-rich country in Africa. It accounts for approximately 52 percent of Africa's surface water reserves and 23 percent of Africa's internal renewable water resources. The internal renewable freshwater resources per capita were estimated at 14,406 m^{3}/person/year in 2008. This value is significantly higher than the internationally recognized water sufficiency limit of 1,700 m^{3}/person/year. The DRC has an average annual precipitation of around 1,543 mm/year, varying in space and time (800–1,800 mm/year). Furthermore, the DRC possesses considerable water autonomy since 70 percent of its total renewable water resources are generated internally from precipitation. The abundant water resources in the DRC are linked to the vast forest coverage, which extends over 155.5 million ha.

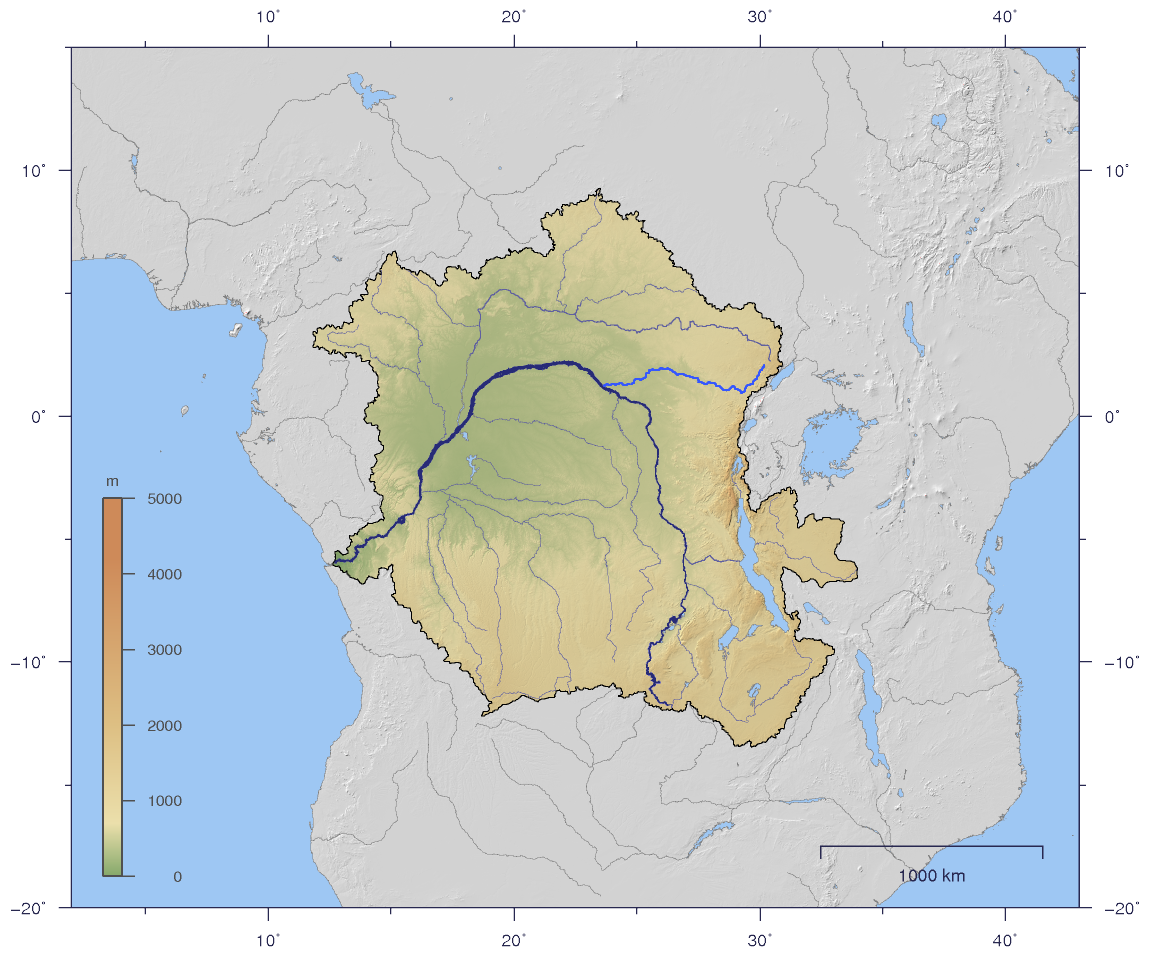
Congo River drainage basin

Rivers and lakes comprise approximately 3.5 percent of the DRC's surface area. The surface water resources of the DRC are dominated by the Congo River and its tributaries. With a mean flow of around 41,000 m^{3}/s, the Congo River has the second largest discharge volume in the world. The Congo River basin accounts for 98 percent of the country's surface area and provides the country with one of the most extensive river networks in the world. The quality of surface waters is generally very good, with the exception of localized pollution hotspots in urban centres and near mining operations. The high water quality is mostly a result of the high dilution capacity of the river network, the low population density and the dominance of human activities that belong to the subsistence type, having only a minor impact on the environment.

Groundwater is estimated to account for approximately 47 percent of the DRC's internal renewable water resources. Springs located in dense forests are the main source of water supply for the majority of the population. However, information on extent and quality of groundwater resources and springs in the DRC is scarce. Simple, capped springheads are commonly used for water supply in dispersed villages and peri-urban areas. Large-scale water supply from springs through distribution networks is used in many cities, including Beni, Bunia, Lisala, Lubumbashi, Kisangani and Mbuji-Mayi. Water supply from deep-drilled wells is limited to a small percentage of the population. Most of the approximately 1,000 wells were constructed between the 1960s and 1990s and have yields between 15 and 80 m^{3}/h. Hand and mechanical pump wells and dug wells account for around 10 percent of the drinking water supply.

In 2015, there were still around 1 million people without access to "improved" water. In 2015, 76% of the population had access to an "improved" water source, 96% and 40% in urban and rural areas, respectively.

== Water use ==
Water withdrawals per person were estimated at 7 m^{3}/person/year in 2014, which indicate only a small level of water resource mobilization (less than 1 percent). Water use per capita in the DRC is considerably lower than in many arid Sahel countries, which experience a physical water scarcity problem. Water is mainly utilized for domestic purposes, comprising 52 percent of total water withdrawals in the DRC. Agriculture accounts for 32 percent of total water withdrawals, followed by industry with 16 percent. Fisheries, hydropower generation and navigation are other important water uses in the DRC, which are typically not included in water use statistics.

Water withdrawal in the DRC is projected to increase significantly by 2025. Domestic use, agriculture and industry are expected to grow by 470 percent, 375 percent and 225 percent, respectively. However, water consumption by 2025 would still comprise only 0.16 percent of DRC's internal renewable freshwater resources.

== Water sector structure ==
The development and rehabilitation of the water sector is a priority to which the national government committed itself in the Growth and Poverty Reduction Strategy Papers (DSCRP I and DSCRP II) and to which it agreed as part of the international framework of the UN Millennium Development Goals. Water sector governance in the DRC is structurally weak and characterized by overlapping and conflicting institutional mandates. Implementation capacity is the major limiting factor for development in the water sector. Large aid flows have been mobilized for the rehabilitation of water supply infrastructure, but due to institutional and administrative dysfunction, weak capacity as well as lacking supporting infrastructure, logistics and economic services, the use of funds has been significantly slowed down. In public projects, utilization of investments is generally less than 50 percent. Moreover, further financial investments are necessary for a comprehensive reform of the water sector.

=== Institutional Framework ===
Management of the water sector in the DRC are divided among several ministries and organizations. The Ministry of Planning has the responsibility for the elaboration and monitoring of the defined Growth and Poverty Reduction Strategies. Under the National Water and Sanitation Committee (CNAEA), it has the authority for policy development and monitoring, coordination of ministries and cooperation with development partners in the water sector. The state-owned cooperation REGIDESO is responsible for providing water supply services in urban areas. It operates under the administrative and financial supervision of the Ministry of State Portfolio and under the technical supervision of the Ministry of Energy. The national rural waterworks service, SNHR, reports to the Ministry of Rural Development and is responsible for the development of rural and peri-urban drinking water supply services. The Ministry of Public Health is also involved in the rural water sector through the Villages Assainis and Écoles Assainies programs, which are supported by UNICEF and designed to engage rural communities in the development of improved drinking water and sanitation services.

=== International assistance and NGOs ===
International assistance plays an important role in the development of the DRC's water sector. International aid is estimated at $62 million per year which corresponds to approximately 95 percent of total investments. Funded projects are mostly directed towards reaching the UN Millennium Development Goals and the national Poverty Reduction Strategies. International investments are targeted equally at the urban and rural water sectors. In peri-urban and rural areas, international assistance comprises nearly all of the total investments.

As part of the humanitarian and emergency relief efforts during the conflict time span, international and national NGOs established a multitude of water supply service projects in the DRC. NGOs provide essential water supply services in remote areas neglected by governmental efforts. However, they are often poorly coordinated and focus on activities that are designed to immediately improve local water supply, but lacking sufficient management structures to maintain the infrastructure in the future.

=== Water sector reform ===
The water sector is subject to ongoing reorganization by a government reform initialized with the help of international development partners in 2006, especially the German GIZ water reform project. In 2010, a comprehensive Water Code geared towards national development goals was adopted by the government of the DRC, which provides a national legislative framework for sustainable water management. Integrated Water Resource Management (IWRM) is a fundamental principle stated in the Water Code, which aims at the establishment of a structured process to reconcile the interests of the different stakeholders. Key concepts include a land zoning system to ensure protection of strategic drinking water resources and their watersheds, user pays principle, polluter pays principle, precautionary principle, subsidiary principle and public dialogue and consultation.

The government of the DRC also released an action plan for the further development of the drinking water sector by 2020. The aim of the action plan is to ensure the implementation of the water sector reform. Therefore, it also serves to harmonise interventions by international donors and to safeguard the orientation of their activities around the national agenda.

Structural transformation of the water sector is a key aspect of the water reform. It includes the replacement of the CNAEA by a National Water Council, which will have the mandate to lead the whole water sector based on an IWRM approach, the establishment of Provincial Water Councils, Local Water Committees and Water User Associations as part of the decentralization approach, and the creation of agencies which are responsible for management of water resources at drainage basin and sub-basin levels. Furthermore, REGIDESO is subject to transformation to a commercial public enterprise.

== Key issues in the water sector ==
Only 46 percent of the DRC's population had access to an improved drinking water source in 2012, compared to an average of 60 percent in Sub-Saharan Africa. Sanitation coverage was estimated at only 31 percent in 2012. The lack of safe drinking water and poor sanitary conditions pose a major risk to public health. The mortality of children under the age of five was estimated at 11.9 percent in 2015, compared to 9.2 percent in Sub-Saharan Africa, with a high prevalence of waterborne diseases like diarrhea, cholera, dysentery and typhoid fever.

There is a major geographic discrepancy in drinking water availability, with 79 percent of the urban population having access to drinking water against 29 percent of the rural and peri-urban population. However, in many areas of the DRC, access to safe drinking water was less than 5 percent in 2011. The level of access to improved sanitation facilities is very low, but comparable in urban (33 percent) and rural areas (29 percent). Financial investments are significantly skewed towards urban areas, with 85 percent of total funding designated for development of the urban water sector, although the rural population still comprised 58 percent of the total population in 2014.

=== Urban and peri-urban water sector ===
Although access to safe drinking water is significantly lower in rural areas than in urban areas in the DRC, the actual number of people without water access is increasing at a significantly higher rate in urban areas because of faster population growth. The average annual growth rate of the urban population over the time period from 2010 to 2015 was estimated at 4 percent, compared to a population growth rate of 1.9 percent in rural areas. The population living in urban areas is estimated at 42 percent. The rapid population growth in urban areas is associated with the expansion of the urban sprawl and poses major difficulties in establishing adequate water infrastructure. Many peri-urban watersheds are being impacted through uncontrolled expansion for housing construction, agriculture and firewood supply.

REGIDESO's water supply services suffer from the degradation of its infrastructure due to lack of electricity, absence of new investments and maintenance. Years of armed conflict, poor leadership, weak governance, depleted finances mostly due to nonpayment of water bills by the government and non-profitable tariff policy, as well as lagging operational performance of REGIDESO have led to the deteriorated state of urban water supply services.

Urban water coverage is significantly heterogeneous. Over 85 percent of the urban water connections are located in four provinces: Kinshasa, Bas Congo, Katanga and South Kivu. Furthermore, funding is heavily skewed towards the city of Kinshasa, receiving almost 40 percent of total investments in the urban water sector.

=== Rural water sector ===
The majority of the DRC's population without access to safe drinking water lives in rural areas. The rural water sector of the DRC has been neglected for many years and is characterized by a deteriorated infrastructure due to lack of maintenance and spare parts. Furthermore, many water systems are of poor construction quality. The major source of rural water supply are springs, accounting for approximately 90 percent of the total rural water supply. Springs have the advantage that they require only minimal investment to install and maintain. However, springs are often exploited without adequate protection and development. Another important source of water supply in rural areas are shallow wells, using hand and machine pumps. Other rural water supply sources include boreholes, small piped distribution systems and rainwater harvesting systems. Generally, charges for rural water systems do not cover operational costs. Furthermore, almost no water quality testing is conducted.

Current investments in the rural water sector aim at the expansion of borehole drilling and small piped networks in large villages, which each serve between 2,000 and 5,000 people and are managed by autonomous community-based associations and local private firms. Furthermore, the Villages Assainis and Écoles Assainies programs target the systematic development of the rural water sector in small dispersed villages of typically 500 to 1,000 people. The key concept of the program is the improvement of drinking water quality by tapping springs and installing shallow wells with the help of the local communities. Small villages with a population of less than 100 people, which account for 37 percent of the rural population, are not captured by the program and, hence, represent a gap in the development plans for the water sector.

=== Social impacts ===
The water crisis in the DRC is impacting especially the most vulnerable groups of society, namely women and children living in poor, unplanned peri-urban areas and remote rural areas. In crowded urban centres, households often have to purchase their water at inflated prices due to high demand and supply scarcity, while unimproved water sources are used for drinking water supply in rural areas, posing significant health risks.

Typically, women and children assume the main responsibility of providing water supplies for their families. Water supply scarcity transforms this process into a highly laborious and time-consuming activity, which decreases the amount of time available for education.

=== Degradation of water resources ===
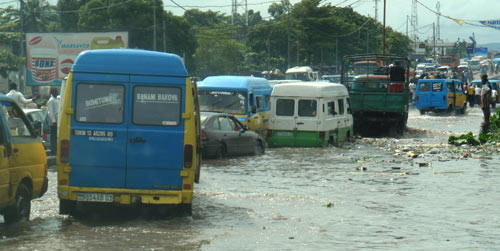
Flooding in Kinshasa

In many areas of the DRC, land use changes are associated with degradation of drinking water sources. The main threat to drinking water sources poses the unregulated growth of urban and rural areas. The nonexistence of drinking water protection zones results in the exposure of vulnerable source areas to pollution and land degradation. Springs, river intake zones, wellheads, priority lake and reservoir segments as well as aquifer recharge areas comprise the most endangered water source areas, which typically lack any form of identifiable demarcation and protection. Modification of runoff patterns, increased erosion and environmental degradation are the consequences of unregulated expansion of inhabited and agricultural areas. Development of housing, poor road construction, pit latrines, septic tanks, mining operations, and tailings are important contributors to pollution of water sources. In urban areas, industry, fuel stations, garages, abattoirs and storm water runoff are further sources of contamination. Biological contamination from sewage and solid waste disposal and increased suspended sediment loads are the two main sources of pollution.

The underlying cause of the degradation of water resources is the lack of organized land use planning and management. Furthermore, nationwide water quality monitoring is lacking.

== Solving the water crisis: UN recommendations ==
In order to reach the water targets stated in the Growth and Poverty Reduction Strategy Papers and the UN Millennium Development Goals, UNEP published several recommendations for tackling the water issues in the DRC in its technical report in 2011. These recommendations are centred around three key aspects: Support of the water sector governance reform, technical and institutional capacity-building and establishing a scientific information base.

Recommendations highlighted as "key interventions" include: a) the development of a national water policy, sectoral water strategies and statutory regulations; b) the establishment of a comprehensive national water information system; c) implementation of autonomous, community-based management of microscale water infrastructure; d) establishment of a capacity-building program for decentralized water institutions; e) development and implementation of watershed-based source protection plans.

The UN recommendations on water issues in the DRC had a target date of 2015, in line with the UN Millennium Development Goals. The global UN Millennium Development Goals Report 2015 is already available. However, a detailed evaluation of the current situation of the water sector in the Democratic Republic of Congo has not been published yet. In January 2016, the World Bank commissioned a study to characterize levels of poverty in the DRC, including the evaluation of the quality of access to water and sanitation services.

== See also ==
- Atmospheric water generator
- Democratic Republic of the Congo
- Desalination
- Water scarcity in Africa
- Water issues in developing countries
- Water scarcity
- Water politics
- Integrated water resources management
- UN Millennium Development Goals
- Economic water scarcity
