= Oued Beht (archaeological site) =

- Interactive map of Oued Beht
- ~33°53′01″N 5°56′02″W
- Type: Agricultural Complex
- Location: Khémisset Province, Morocco
- Region: Maghreb

Oued Beht is an archaeological site located in Morocco. It is a neolithic site dated from 3400-2900 BCE. Because Oued Beht is one of the largest and oldest agricultural complexes outside the Nile Corridor, it gives researchers insight into the significance and nature of the historical relationship between the Maghreb and the rest of the Mediterranean. Oued Beht in particular has several parallels with the southern Iberian Peninsula.

== Geography ==
The site overlooks the Baht River in the Zemmour Plateau between the Rabat and the Meknés Mountains. Today the site sits roughly 100 kilometers inland but could have been closer to the coast during its original occupation. It's location gives the site a semi-arid Mediterranean climate that is well suited to cereal farming. Since 2013, a tree planting initiative has been enacted in the northern part of the site. Pits dug for these trees can reach the depths of archaeological deposits and, in areas, have likely disturbed artifacts on and below the surface.

== Excavation history ==
Arial Photo of Excavation Site and Baht River

The site was first discovered in the 1930s when construction workers who were working on a project in the area stumbled upon polished stone axes/adzes for which the site would become famous for. The site was then excavated by a french team led by Armand Ruhlmann. This excavation mainly focused on defining linear features found at the site. The site then went under excavations in 2005 and in 2016 and 2017. The findings from these excavations were never formally published, but archaeologists leading these digs collaborated with the team leading the current excavations. Current excavations are being undertaken by the British-Italian-Moroccan Oued Beht Archaeological Project (OBAP) who have been working on the site since 2021 and just recently published their findings from their 2024 season.

== Periods of use/occupation ==
=== Neolithic ===
This time period at the site is dated from the mid 4th to early 3rd millennium BC. The society active in the area at the time was dependent on agriculture and silos found at the sight provide evidence for potential large-scale storage of crops. Thousands of polished stone axes/adzes were found at the site, leading to the site becoming associated with the artifacts. There were not many axes/adzes found during the most recent excavations of the site, this is likely due to so many of them being removed already. Distinctive painted pottery from this period points to connections with the Southern Iberian Peninsula.

=== Bronze Age (Provisional) ===
The discovery of two copper artifacts suggests the possibility of a Bronze Age at Oued Beht. However, neither artifact was able to produce a reliable date and there is no other evidence pointing to a Bronze Age at the settlement. These facts led archaeologists to only provisionally name a Bronze Age until they are able to conduct further research.

=== Historic (~1,000–1900AD) ===
On a ridge in the northwest corner of the site, a concentration of pottery points to a potential rural medieval settlement. Plain and decorated (glazed) potter were both found, with one decorated in cobalt blue paint that was likely imported from Fez. A variety of vessels were found including containers, stemmed lamps, and potential storage and/or transport containers. Archaeologists theorize that this was likely an agricultural hamlet or small village. These types of settlements were common in the area at the time, however rural archaeology in Morocco is under researched. One burial and two potential burials provide potential evidence for a medieval Islamic settlement or influence. However, this hypothesis is not certain and archaeologists stress that other considerations must not be abandoned.

=== Modern (20th & 21st Centuries) ===
Modern activity at the site largely consists of various archaeological excavations, starting in the 1930s. In 2013, there was a tree planting innitative implemented in the area that ended up disturbing some of the archaeological context.

== Important finds ==
=== Agricultural complex ===
Oued Beht was a vast agricultural complex during the Final Neolithic (3,400-2,900 BCE) spanning 10 hectares. Excavations revealed a variety of artifacts providing evidence for this including botanical and faunal remains, pottery, and macroliths. Various bell-shaped pits were found throughout the site. These pits are theorized to have been used as storage silos largely due to their shape. Various plant remains were found in the pits, including mostly domesticated naked barley but also wheat, peas, wild legumes, and wild pistachios. Archaeologists believe that these seeds were likely cooked then deposited into the pit rather than stored there. Animal remains are another find providing evidence of the site being used as an agricultural complex. Analysis of these remains provide evidence for domesticated goats, sheep, and possibly cattle and pigs, though the possibility of there being wild boar and aurochs at the complex cannot be ruled out. Macroliths including grinding tools, pestles, and mortars provide evidence for the processing of food at the site. Pottery related to cooking and storing of food was also discovered.

=== Dating ===
A key find of the OBAP excavations was their ability to obtain 37 radiocarbon dates. These dates allowed for more substantial insight into the chronology of the site than what was available before their excavations. The original 13 dates found in their 2021-2022 field season provided an overall date range of 3800-2700 BCE. They did not find evidence for continual occupation and theorized that the site may have been occupied in periodic intervals. The 24 new radiocarbon dates found during the 2023 field season allowed OBAP archaeologists to hypothesize 4 site-wide phases; The Final Neolithic, Bronze Age (provisional), Historic (roughly 1000-1900 CE), and Modern (20-21st centuries).

Linear Features

=== Linear Features ===
The Oued Beht archaeological site contains four walls that, in combination with embankments and existing terrain, provide ample protection against potential attacks by closing off exposed approaches. The archaeologist who originally excavated the site, Armand Ruhlmann, theorized that Oued Beht was used for temporary protection Neolithic groups living in the area could retreat to when under attack. OBAP's excavations revealed that the walls were build in phases. The original construction started shortly after the Final Neolithic and the walls were reused and modified during the Medieval phases. The defensive theories of the walls have not been ruled out.

=== Burials ===
Excavated Grave Cut

One definite and three potential burials were found in the northern area of the site. Only the definite burial was fully excavated. The individual buried was determined to be a sub-adult and a molar from the individual was dated to the 13th century CE. There was no cultural material discovered, but most of the potential graves were oriented east-west with the heads facing west. This does not align with modern Islamic burials but hints to cultural significance and Medieval Islamic practices cannot be ruled out.

=== Axes/Adzes ===
Many polished stone axes/adzes were found a Oued Beht. The site became known for these artifacts with some collections having over 1,000 of them being studied. Looting and trade has led to many of these tools being sold and lost to the archaeological and historical records.

=== Copper ===
Two copper artifacts were found at Oued Beht. The first was a copper-based shaft and the second was a small fragment of a copper-based artifact. Neither of these finds were able to be dated so a definitive Bronze Age at the site was not able to be established. However, their existence speaks to the possibility of such a phase existing.

== Greater mediterranean context ==
Oued Beht's location and scale provides insight into the practices of people in Mediterranean Africa during the Final Neolithic. It shows that complex farming societies were around and provides potential evidence for trading or cultural exchange between the Maghreb and Southern Iberia. While connections between North Africa and Southern Iberia have been made through maritime routes, pottery found at Oued Beht with a distinctive painted pattern shared with Southern Iberia, along with new dating from the site has expanded the knowledge of the timeline and trade between the two regions. Other parallels between Oued Beht and Southern Iberia include similar bell-shaped silos and sickle blades. This multitude of parallels between the two areas suggests a continued cultural exchange. The findings of Oued Beht aid in broadening the picture of this relationship, but more research needs to be done to see a fuller picture.
