= François de Pierrefeu =

French engineer and urban planner

- Born: François-Marie-Joseph Malcor Deydier de Pierrefeu; 3 March 1891; Aix-en-Provence, Bouches-du-Rhône
- Died: 1959 (aged 67–68); Cuers, Var
- Occupations: Engineer and urban planner
- Known for: co-author of La Maison des hommes together with Le Corbusier

François de Pierrefeu (3 March 1891 – 1959) was a French engineer and urban planner.

== Early years ==
François-Marie-Joseph Malcor Deydier de Pierrefeu was born on 3 March 1891 in Aix-en-Provence, Bouches-du-Rhône. His parents were Louis-Marie-Victor-Henri Malcor Deydier de Pierrefeu, who had independent means, and Thérèse de Villeneuve-Escaplon. He was a brilliant secondary student and won the first prize for Philosophy. He was admitted to the École Polytechnique in 1911. During World War I (1914-1918) he served in Naval Aviation. He was made a knight of the Legion of Honour in 1918.

== Career ==
After leaving the navy de Pierrefeu devoted himself in part to applied science and technology, in particular to urban planning, and in part to intellectual speculation inspired by the symbolism of numbers and forms. In August 1924 he married Fanita d'Onthcorn. As an engineer, de Pierrefeu was prime contractor for the Oued-Beth Dam in the region of Meknes, Morocco. He then became director of the company Grands travaux hydrauliques de Marseille (Great Hydraulic Works of Marseille).

In January 1931 Philippe Lamour founded Plans with a group of syndicalists that included Dr. Pierre Winter, François de Pierrefeu, Hubert Lagardelle and Le Corbusier. Plans was an avant-garde journal that covered urban planning. The magazine moved leftward in the spring of 1932, and ceased publication in the fall of 1932. In the fall of 1933 Le Corbusier founded its successor, Prélude with Winter, de Pierrefeu. and Lagardelle, who acted as co-editors. De Pierrefeu also contributed to journals such as L'Homme réel and Voici la France de ce mois.

Le Corbusier invited de Pierrefeu to purchase an apartment in the block at 24 Rue Nungesser et Coli in Paris which Le Corbusier and Pierre Jeanneret had built in 1931-1934. He was in the original list of occupants of 14 April 1934, as was Winter. Before the Vichy government took power, de Pierrefeu worked with Le Corbusier and the playwright Jean Giraudoux on a government study commission on housing. Using the results of this study, in 1942 de Pierrefeu and Le Corbusier published La Maison des hommes, which they had co-authored. On 27 May 1941 Le Corbusier, de Pierrefeu and André Boll were assigned by the Vichy government to a commission to study developing a national construction policy. They were to make inquiries wherever they thought would be useful in France, the empire and other countries. On 14 July 1941 the government cancelled the project.

François de Pierrefeu's second wife was Maria de Hantoin, a widow with a passion for spiritualism and catharism. In the aftermath of the Second World War, de Pierrefeu took up residence at the Ritz, where he maintained relations and correspondence with mathematicians and philosophers of his time including René Guénon, Raymond Abellio and F. Vassilenko of the Collège de France. François de Pierrefeu died in 1959 at the chateau of Gairoird in Cuers, Var.

== Publications ==
- Pierrefeu, François de (1932). Le Corbusier et Pierre Jeannerett: illustré de 32 reproductions en héliogravure. éd. G. Crès et Cie.
- Pierrefeu, François de (1939). Les confessions de Tatibouet. Plon.
- Nocher, Jean; Pierrefeu, François de (1941). Gueules noires: dix poèmes libres... dix-sept estampes. Impressions Modernes.
- Pierrefeu, François de; Le Corbusier (1942). The Home of Man. Architectural Press.
- Le Corbusier; Entwhistle, Clive Ernest; Pierrefeu, François de (1948). La Maison Des Hommes. The Home of Man. By Le Corbusier and François de Pierrefeu ... Translated by Clive Entwistle and ... Gordon Holt, Etc. With Illustrations. London.
