= Water scarcity in Africa =

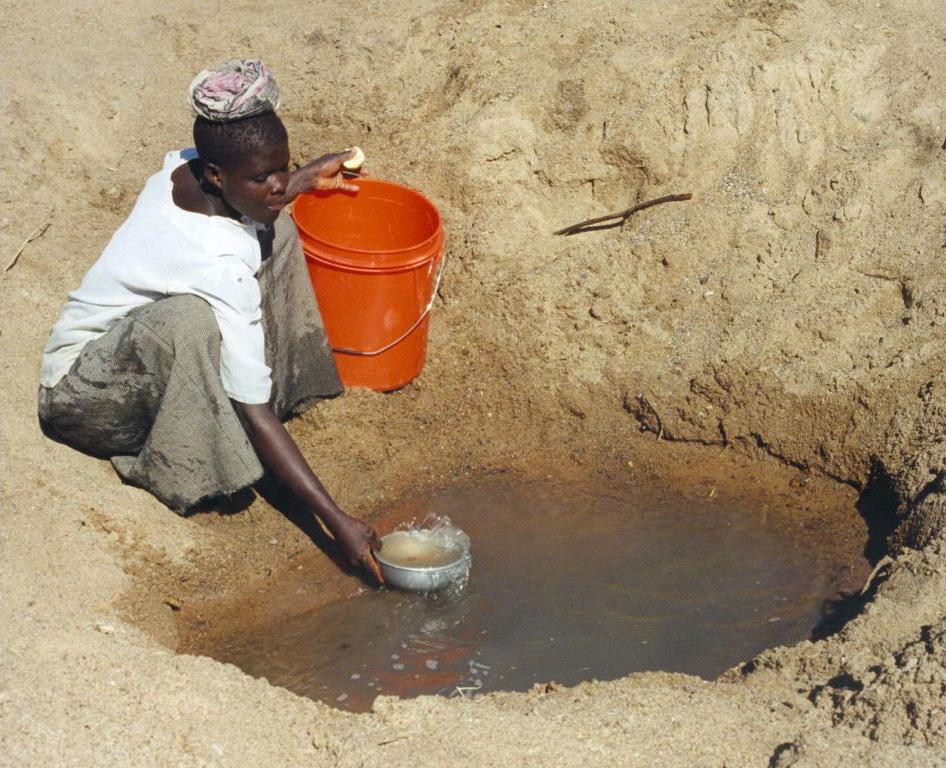
Mwamanogu Village water source, Tanzania. In Meatu District, Shinyanga Region, water most often comes from open holes dug in the sand of dry riverbeds, and it is invariably contaminated.

The main causes of water scarcity in Africa are physical and economic water scarcity, rapid population growth, and the effects of climate change on the water cycle. Water scarcity is the lack of fresh water resources to meet the standard water demand. The rainfall in sub-Saharan Africa is highly seasonal and unevenly distributed, leading to frequent floods and droughts.

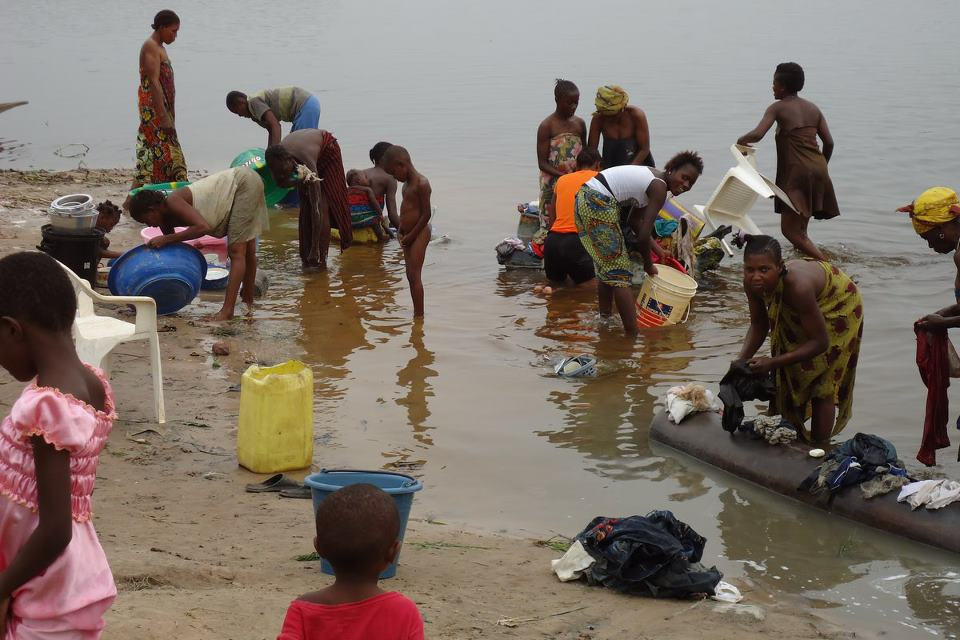
Water challenges in Africa

The Food and Agriculture Organization of the United Nations reported in 2012 that growing water scarcity is now one of the leading challenges for sustainable development. This is because an increasing number of river basins have reached conditions of water scarcity. The reasons for this are the combined demands of agriculture and other sectors. Water scarcity in Africa has several impacts. They range from health, particularly affecting women and children, to education, agricultural productivity and sustainable development. It can also lead to more water conflicts.

To adequately address the issue of water scarcity in Africa, the United Nations Economic Commission for Africa emphasizes the need to invest in the development of Africa's potential water resources. This would improve food security and water security, and protect economic gains by effectively managing droughts, floods and desertification.

== Causes ==
=== Physical and economic scarcity ===
Water scarcity is both a natural and human-made phenomenon, which can be divided into two broad categories: economic scarcity and physical scarcity. Economic scarcity refers to the fact that finding a reliable source of safe water is time-consuming and expensive; physical scarcity is refers to an insufficient amount of water within a given region based on the present needs of the population.

The 2006 United Nations Economic Commission for Africa estimates that 300 million out of the 800 million who live on the African continent live in a water-scarce environment. Specifically in the very north of Africa, as well the very south of Africa, the rising global temperatures accompanying climate change have intensified the hydrological cycle that leads to drier dry seasons, thus increasing the risk of more extreme and frequent droughts. This significantly impacts the availability, quality and quantity of water due to reduced river flows and reservoir storage, lowering of water tables and drying up of aquifers in the northern and southern regions of Africa.

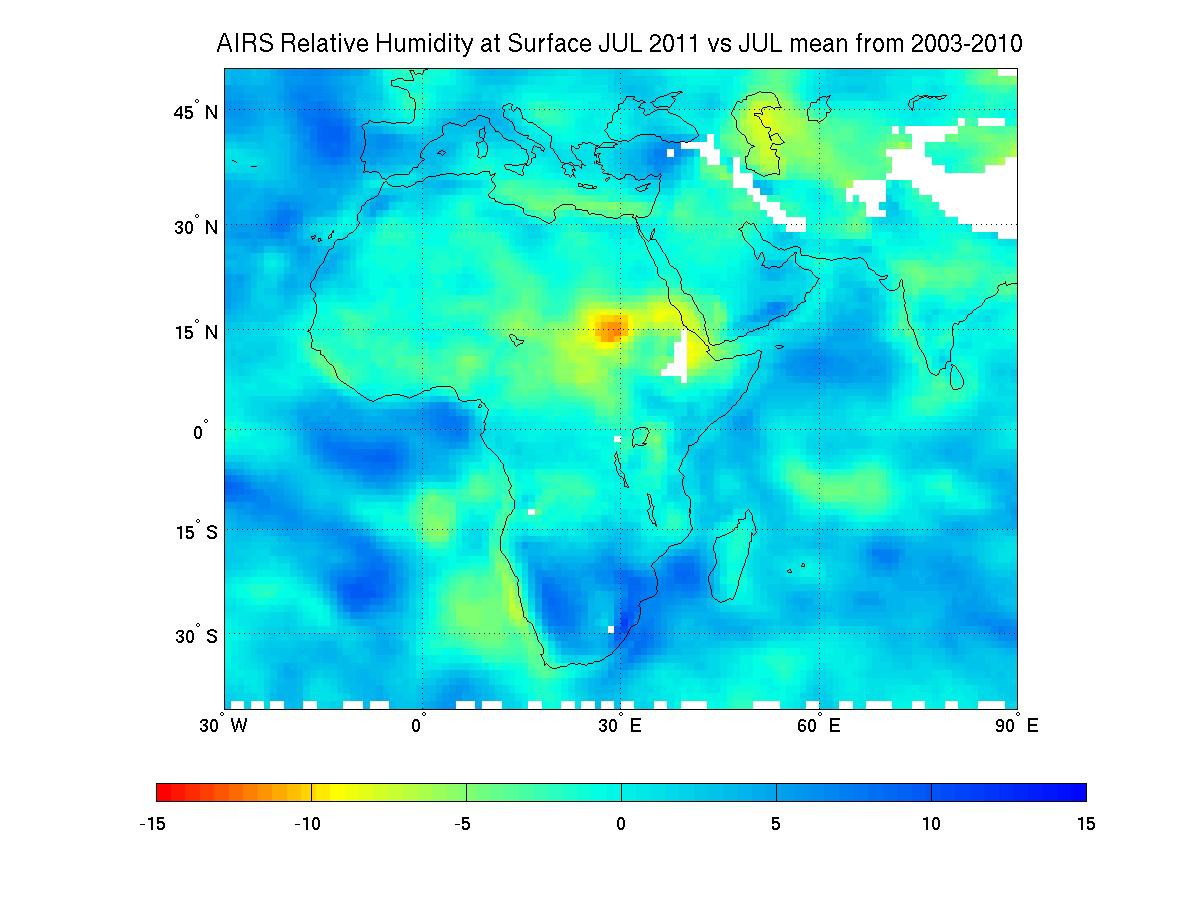
The severity of African drought explained in different geographical areas

Included in the category of physical scarcity is the issue of overexploitation. This is contributing to the shrinking of many of Africa's great lakes, including the Nakivale, Nakuru and Lake Chad, which has shrunk to 10% of its former volume. In terms of policy, the incentives for overuse are among the most damaging, especially concerning ground water extraction. For ground water, once the pump is installed, the policy of many countries is to only constrain removal based on the cost of electricity, and in many cases subsidize electricity costs for agricultural uses, which damages incentives to conserve such resources. Additionally, many countries within Africa set the cost of water well below cost-recovery levels, thus discouraging efficient usage and threatening sustainability.

=== Population growth ===
Over the past century, the global population has more than doubled. Africa's population is notably the fastest growing in the world. It is expected to increase by roughly 50% over the next 18 years, growing from 1.58 billion people today(2026) to over 2.36 billion in 2035. In fact, Africa will account for nearly half of global population growth over the next two decades. There is also a simple but appreciable equation that, as population increases, so does water demand. At the same time, the water resources in African region are gradually diminishing due to the habitation in places that were previously water sources. As the population increases rapidly, there is urgent demands for improved health, quality of life, food security and 'lubrication' of industrial growth, which also place severe constraints on the water available to achieve these goals.

The growing population will only exacerbate the water scarcity crisis as more pressure is placed on the availability and access of water resources. According to the World Wide Fund for Nature, today, 41% of the world's population lives in river basins that are under water stress. This raises a major concern as many regions are reaching the limit at which water services can be sustainably delivered. Globally, about 55 percent of the world's population live in urban areas, and by 2030, there might be a 5 percent increase in this ratio. This is the same experience in Africa. Big cities like Lagos, Kinshasa and Nairobi have doubled their population within a fifteen years period. Although people are migrating into these urban cities, the availability of fresh water has stayed the same, or in some cases reduced. The rising population in African cities creates a link to the imbalance between the supply of water and the demands in those cities.

Aside urbanization contributing to the imbalance between the demand and supply of water, urbanization also causes an increase in water pollution. As a result of more people moving into cities, there is increased deposit of sewage and waste into water bodies. In developing countries, over 90 percent of the sewage generated are disposed into water bodies and left untreated. Also, sewage system are inefficiently run, such that leaks from sewage pipes are left unattended to, which eventually leak into the soil and causes further pollution of underground water.

=== Climate change ===
According to the Africa Partnership Forum, "Although Africa is continent least responsible for climate change, it is particularly vulnerable to the effects," and the long-term impacts include, "changing rainfall patterns affecting agriculture and reducing food security; worsening water security; decreasing fish resources in large lakes due to rising temperature; shifting vector-borne diseases; rising sea level affecting low-lying coastal areas with large populations; and rising water stress". Such impacts can drastically affect the quantity and quality of water that children need to survive.

Studies predict that by the year 2050 the rainfall in Sub-Saharan Africa could drop by 10%, which will cause a major water shortage. This 10% decrease in precipitation would reduce drainage by 17% and the regions which are receiving 500–600 mm/year rainfall will experience a reduction by 50–30% respectively in the surface drainage. Additionally, the Human Development Report predicts warming paired with 10% less rainfall in interior regions of Africa, which will be amplified by water loss due to water loss increase from rising temperature. Droughts and floods are considered to be the most dangerous threat to physical water scarcity. This warming will be greatest over the semi-arid regions of the Sahara, along the Sahel, and interior areas of southern Africa.

The Intergovernmental Panel on Climate Change reports that climate change in Africa has manifested itself in more intense and longer droughts in the subtropics and tropics, while arid or semi-arid areas in northern, western, eastern, and parts of southern Africa are becoming drier and more susceptible to variability of precipitation and storms. Climate change has contributed immensely to the already exacerbating water crisis situation in Africa and globally, making the World Health organization declare climate change as the greatest threat to global health in the 21st century.

The Human Development Report goes on to explain that because of Africa's dependence on rain-fed agriculture, widespread poverty and weak capacity, the water issues caused by climate change impact the continent much more violently compared to developed nations that have the resources and economic diversity to deal with such global changes. This heightened potential for drought and falling crop yields will most likely lead to increased poverty, lower incomes, less secure livelihoods, and an increased threat of chronic hunger for the poorest people in sub-Saharan Africa. Overall this means that water stress caused by changing amounts of precipitation is particularly damaging to Africa and thus climate change is one of the major obstacles the continent must face when trying to secure reliable and clean sources of water.

== Impacts ==
=== Health ===
People living in water-deprived regions turn to unsafe water resources, which contributes to the spread of waterborne diseases including typhoid fever, cholera, dysentery and diarrhea. Additionally, water scarcity causes many people to store water within the household, which increases the risk of household water contamination and incidents of malaria and dengue fever spread by mosquitoes. These waterborne diseases are not usually found in developed countries because of sophisticated water treatment systems that filter and chlorinate water, but for those living with less developed or non-existent water infrastructure, natural, untreated water sources often contain tiny disease-carrying worms and bacteria. Although many of these waterborne sicknesses are treatable and preventable, they are nonetheless one of the leading causes of disease and death in the world. Globally, 2.2 million people die each year from diarrhea-related disease, and at any given time fifty percent of all hospital beds in the world are occupied by patients with water-related diseases. Infants and children are especially susceptible to these diseases because of their young immune systems, which lends to elevated infant mortality rates in many regions of Africa.

When infected with these waterborne diseases, those living in African communities suffering from water scarcity cannot contribute to the community's productivity and development because of a simple lack of strength. Additionally, individual, community and governmental economic resources are sapped by the cost of medicine to treat waterborne diseases, which takes away from resources that might have potentially been allocated in support of food supply or school fees. Also, some farmers in developing countries use these contaminated water to irrigate their crops which breeds diseases such as, parasitic infection caused by intestinal worms, hepatitis A and E, and dysentery due to the consumption of these crops.

=== Women and girls ===
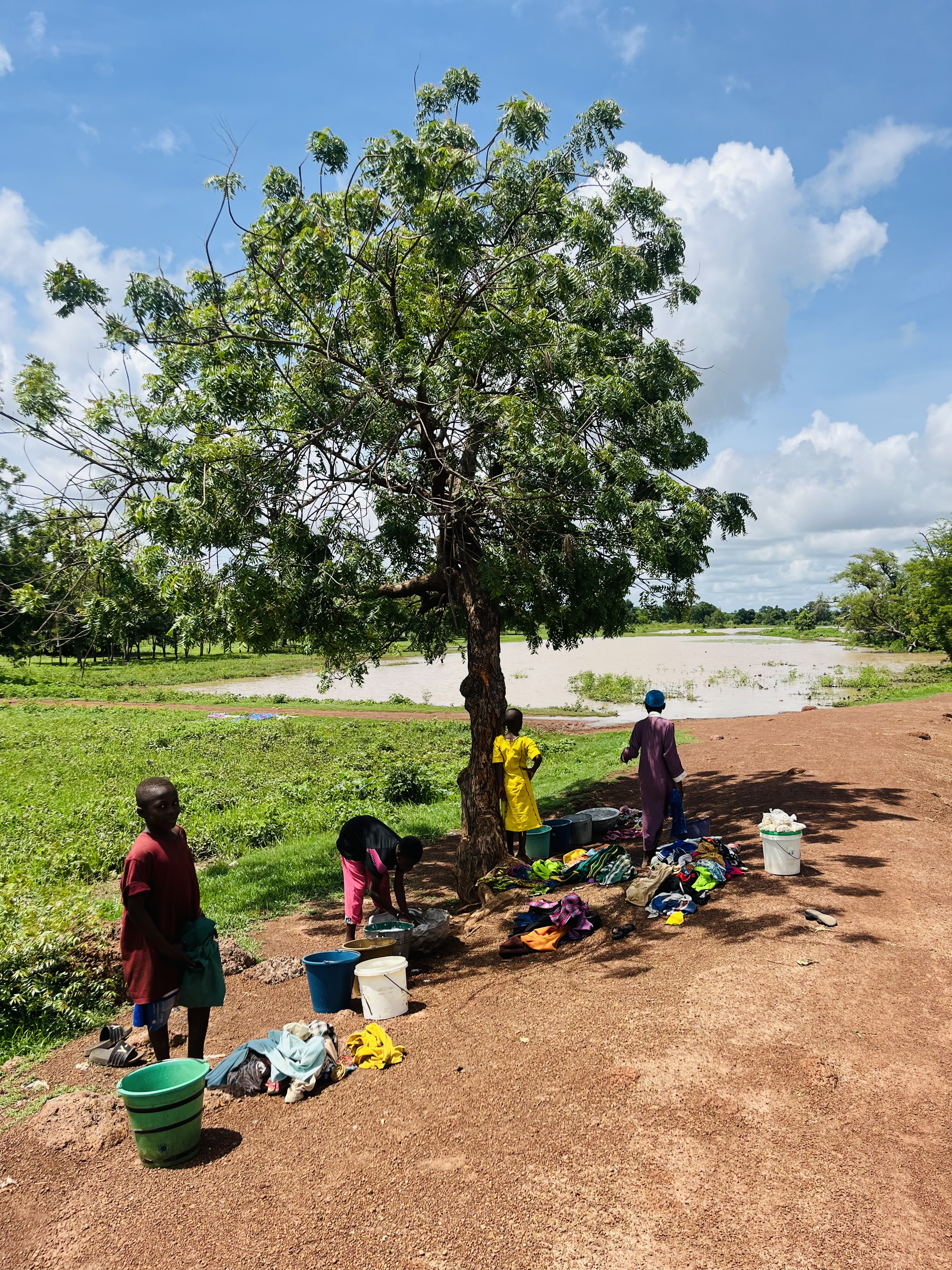
Young girls doing laundry at a dam

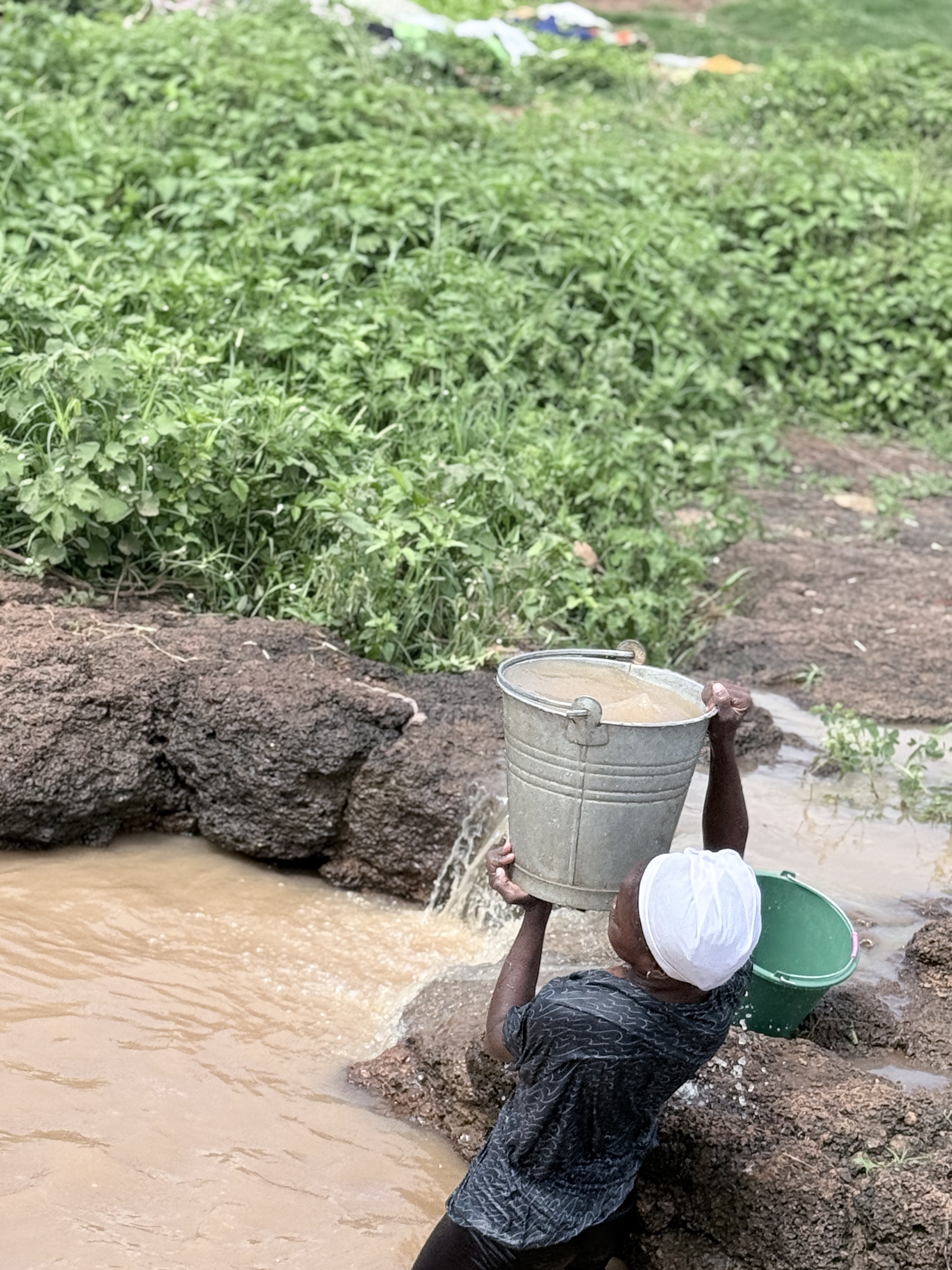
Woman lifting water bucket in Karaga, Ghana

African women and men's divergent social positions lead to differences in water responsibilities, rights and access, and so African women are disproportionally burdened by the scarcity of clean drinking water. In most African societies, women are seen as the collectors, managers and guardians of water, especially within the domestic sphere that includes household chores, cooking, washing and child rearing. Because of these traditional gender roles, many women spend up to sixty percent of each day collecting water, which translates to approximately 200 million collective work hours by women globally per day and a decrease in the amount of time available for education.

Another issue is a lack of support and hygiene products for girls who have their period; when schools do not provide supplies or a clean, hygienic place for girls to use the bathroom, girls are more likely to drop out of school before or soon after reaching puberty. Water scarcity exacerbates this issue, as indicated by the correlation of decrease in access to water with a decrease in combined primary, secondary and tertiary enrollment of women.

For African women, their daily role in clean water retrieval often means carrying the typical jerrycan that can weigh over 40 pounds (18 kg) when full for an average of six kilometers (3.7 mi) each day. This has health consequences such as permanent skeletal damage from carrying heavy loads of water over long distances each day, which translates to a physical strain that contributes to increased stress, increased time spent in health recovery, and decreased ability to not only physically attend educational facilities, but also mentally absorb education due to the effect of stress on decision-making and memory skills. Also, in terms of health, access to safe and clean drinking water leads to greater protection from water-borne illnesses and diseases which increases all students' capabilities to attend school.

=== Agriculture ===
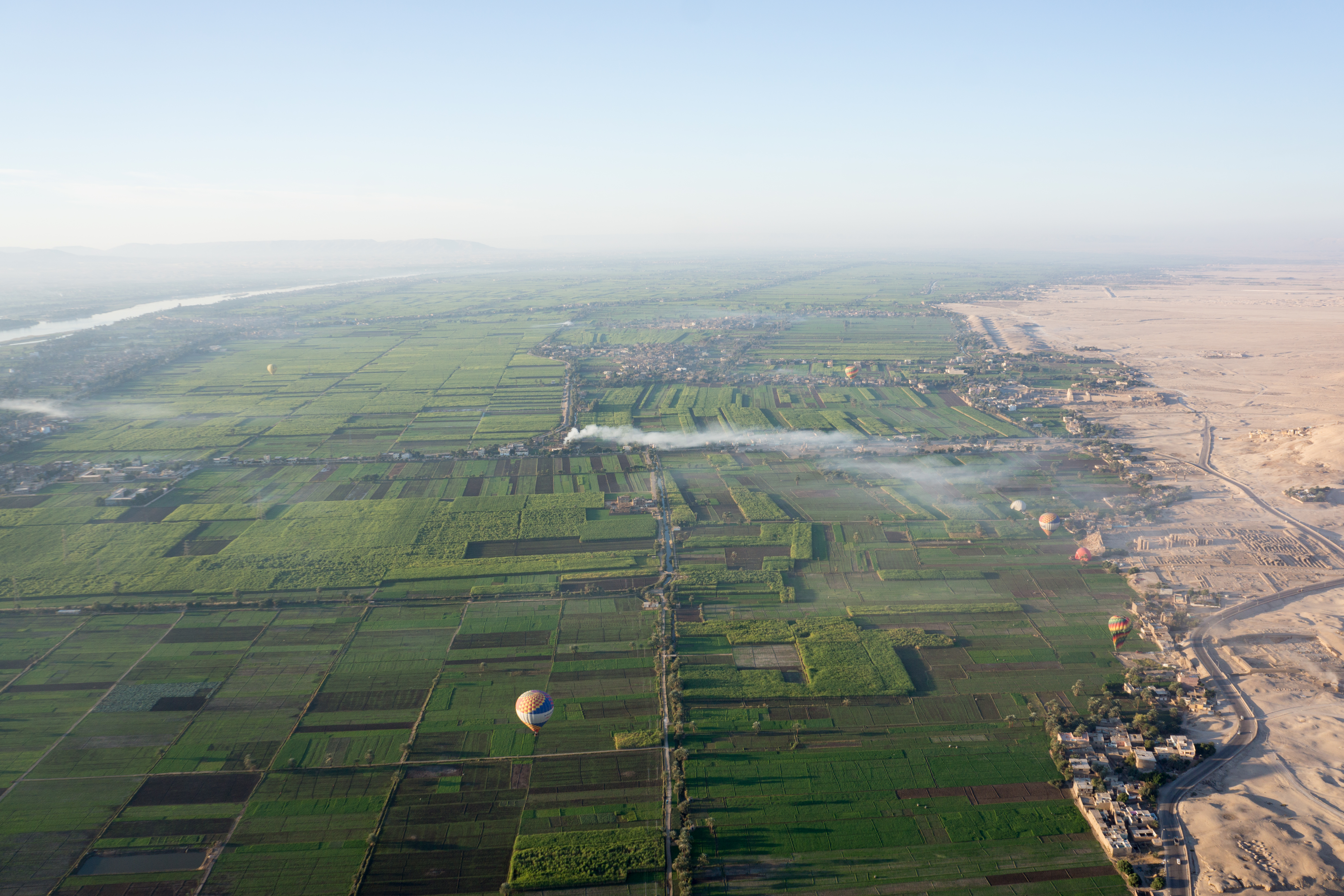
Ethiopia's move to fill the Grand Ethiopian Renaissance Dam's reservoir could reduce Nile flows by as much as 25% and devastate Egyptian farmlands.

Because the majority of Africa remains dependent on an agricultural lifestyle and 80% to 90% of all families in rural Africa rely upon producing their own food, water scarcity translates to a loss of food security. More than 70% of agriculture practiced in Sub-Saharan Africa is rainfed agriculture. With the increasing variability of current weather patterns the crops and harvests are more prone to being affected by droughts and floods.

According to the UN Economic Commission for Africa and New Partnership for Africa's Development, "irrigation is key to achieving increased agricultural production that is important for economic development and for attaining food security". Most of the rural African communities are currently not tapping into their irrigation potential. Irrigation agriculture only accounts for 20% of agriculture types globally. In Sub-Saharan Africa the governments have historically played a large part in irrigation development. Starting in the 1960s donors like the World Bank supported these African governments in the development of irrigations systems. However, in the years since, irrigation agriculture has produced a lower than expected crop yield. According to the World Bank the agriculture production in Sub-Saharan Africa could nearly triple by 2050.

Sustainable Development Goal 2 aims to end hunger and promote sustainable agriculture to achieve food and nutrition security. In order to meet the goal, there would need to be a shift from high-yield crop production to a more diversified cropping system, including underutilized nutritious crops that will contribute to dietary diversity and achieve daily nutrient goals.

But for many regions, there is a lack of financial and human resources to support infrastructure and technology required for proper crop irrigation. Because of this, the impact of droughts, floods, and desertification is greater in terms of both African economic loss and human life loss due to crop failure and starvation. In a study conducted by the World Bank, they found that, on average, individuals who suffer from malnutrition lose 10% of their potential lifetime earnings. They also found that countries lose 2 to 3% of their GDP due to undernutrition.

Additionally, lack of water causes many Africans to use wastewater for crop growth, causing a large number of people to consume foods that can contain chemicals or disease-causing organisms transferred by the wastewater. Greywater constructed wetlands and modified sand filters are two methods of greywater filtration that have been proposed. These methods allow for greywater to be purified or filtered to remove biological hazards from the water that would not be safe to use in agriculture. Thus, for the extremely high number of African areas suffering from water scarcity issues, investing in development means sustainably withdrawing from clean freshwater sources, ensuring food security by expanding irrigation areas, and effectively managing the effects of climate change. The sustainable development goal report aims at increasing safe wastewater use to contribute to increasing food production and improved nutrition.

== Productivity and development ==
Poverty is directly related to the accessibility of clean drinking water—without it, the chances of breaking out of the poverty trap are extremely slim. This concept of a "water poverty trap" was developed by economists specifically observing sub-Saharan Africa and refers to a cycle of financial poverty, low agricultural production, and increasing environmental degradation. In this negative feedback loop, this creates a link between the lack of water resources with the lack of financial resources that affect all societal levels including individual, household, and community. Within this poverty trap, people are subjected to low incomes, high fixed costs of water supply facilities, and lack of credit for water investments, which results in a low level of investment in water and land resources, lack of investment in profit-generating activities, resource degradation and chronic poverty. Compounding on this, in the slums of developing countries, poor people typically pay five to ten times more per unit of water than do people with access to piped water because of issues—including the lack of infrastructure and government corruption—which is estimated to raise the prices of water services by 10% to 30%.

The social and economic consequences of a lack of clean water penetrate into realms of education, opportunities for gainful employment, physical strength and health, agricultural and industrial development, and thus the overall productive potential of a community, nation, and/or region. Because of this, the UN estimates that Sub-Saharan Africa alone loses 40 billion potential work hours per year collecting water.

== Conflict ==
The population growth across the world and the climate change are two factors that together could give rise to water conflicts in many parts of the world. Already, the explosion of populations in developing nations within Africa, combined with climate change, is causing extreme strain within and between nations. In the past, countries have worked to resolve water tensions through negotiation, but there is predicted to be an escalation in aggression over water accessibility.

Africa's susceptibility to potential water-induced conflict can be separated into four regions: the Nile, Niger, Zambezi and Volta basins. Running through Egypt, Ethiopia and Sudan, the Nile's water has the potential to spark conflict and unrest. In the region of the Niger, the river basin extends from Guinea through Mali and down to Nigeria. Especially for Mali—one of the world's poorest countries—the river is vital for food, water and transportation, and its over-usage is contributing to an increasingly polluted and unusable water source. In southern Africa, the Zambezi river basin is one of the world's most over-used river systems, and so Zambia and Zimbabwe compete fiercely over it. In 2000, Zimbabwe caused the region to experience the worst flooding in recent history when the country opened the Kariba Dam gates. Finally, within the Volta river basin, Ghana is dependent on its hydroelectric output but plagued by regular droughts which affect the production of electricity from the Akosombo Dam and limit Ghana's ability to sustain economic growth. Paired with the constraints this also puts on Ghana's ability to provide power for the area, this could potentially contribute to regional instability.

At this point, federal intelligence agencies have issued the joint judgment that in the next ten years, water issues are not likely to cause internal and external tensions that lead to the intensification war. But if current rates of consumption paired with climatic stress continue, levels of water scarcity in Africa are predicted by UNECA to reach dangerously high levels by 2025. This means that by 2022 there is the potential for a shift in water scarcity's potential to contribute to armed conflict. Based on the classified National Intelligence Estimate on water security, requested by Secretary of State Hillary Clinton and completed in Fall 2011, after 2022 water will be more likely to be used as a weapon of war and potential tool for terrorism, especially in North Africa. On World Water Day, the State Department stated that water stress, "will likely increase the risk of instability and state failure, exacerbate regional tensions and distract countries from working with the United States on important policy objectives." Specifically referring to the Nile in Egypt, Sudan and nations further south, the report predicts that upstream nations will limit access to water for political reasons and that terrorists may target water-related infrastructures, such as reservoirs and dams, more frequently. Because of this, the World Economic Forum's 2011 Global Risk Report has included water scarcity as one of the world's top five risks for the first time.

== Approaches for managing scarcity ==
A Water.org video about addressing water scarcity in Ethiopia

=== Water permit systems ===
Some regions in African countries, like Tanzania, have attempted to address issues with water scarcity by instituting a water permit system. Under such a system, local rules are used to grant users access to a certain amount of water at certain locations. However, such systems often result in additional conflict, as water rights can be monopolized by large-scale irrigators at the expense of smallholder farmers in the region.

=== Desalination ===
Desalination is a process that aims to make sea salt water into fresh water by removing the salts in it. Many African countries, such as Algeria, Morocco and South Africa, use this technology to battle water scarcity. Nevertheless, running desalination plants has its challenges; it requires a substantial amount of electricity, chemicals and a good infrastructure, making it hard for developing countries to own one.

== International and non-governmental organizations' efforts ==
To adequately address the issue of water scarcity in Africa, the United Nations Economic Commission for Africa emphasizes the need to invest in the development of Africa's potential water resources to reduce unnecessary suffering, ensure food security, and protect economic gains by effectively managing droughts, floods and desertification. Some suggested and ongoing efforts to achieve this include an emphasis on infrastructural implementations and improvements of wells, rainwater catchment systems, and clean-water storage tanks.

Efforts made by the United Nations in compliance with the Millennium Development Goals have targeted water scarcity not just for Africa, but globally. The compiled list includes eight international development goals, seven of which are directly impacted by water scarcity. Access to water affects poverty, food scarcity, educational attainment, social and economic capital of women, livelihood security, disease, and human and environmental health. Because addressing the issue of water is so integral to reaching the MDGs, one of the sub-goals includes halving the proportion of the globe's population without sustainable access to safe drinking water by 2015. In March 2012, the UN announced that this goal has been met almost four years in advance, suggesting that global efforts to reduce water scarcity are on a successful trend.

As one of the five permanent members of the United Nations Security Council, the United States plays an integral role in promoting solutions to aid with clean water scarcity. One of many efforts include USAID's WASH—the WASH for Life partnership with the Gates Foundation—that works to promote water, sanitation and hygiene. With this, the U.S. "will identify, test, and scale up evidence-based approaches for delivering these services to people in some of the poorest regions". Additionally, in March 2012, Hillary Clinton announced the U.S. Water Partnership, which will bring together people from the private sector, the philanthropic community, non-governmental organizations, academics, experts and the government in an attempt to look for system-wide solutions. The technologies and ability to tackle the issue of water scarcity and cleanliness are present, but it is highly a matter of accessibility. Thus, the partnership will aim at making these solutions available and obtainable at a local level.

In addition to the role the United States, the United Nations, and other international governmental bodies, a number of charitable organizations work to provide clean water in Africa and elsewhere around the world. These charities are based on individual and group donations, which are then invested in a variety of methods and technologies to provide clean water. For example, Water to Thrive is a non-profit organization that works to bring clean water to East Africa. Founded in 2008, Water to Thrive has built more than 2,000 wells in Ethiopia, Tanzania and Uganda.

In 2015, safe drinking water and sanitation sources have been provided to 90% of the world's inhabitants because of the efforts that had been made to achieve the MDGs. In continuation of this progress the UN have been recognized to include "Clean water and Sanitation" as the goal number six to "Ensure access to water and sanitation for all". The goal depends on the availability of enough fresh water of the world to achieve universal access to drinking and clean water for sanitation, but the lack of planning and shortage of investment is what the world needs to focus on. The main targets of the six SDG is that by 2030, the world will ensure water access for all, provide sanitary resources especially for people at risk, increase waste treatment and decrease the rate of water pollution. In addition to establishing new collaborative efforts on the international and local levels to improve water management systems.

== Limitations ==
Africa is home to both the largest number of water-scarce countries out of any region, as well as home to the most difficult countries to reach in terms of water aid. The prevalence of rural villages traps many areas in what the UN Economic Commission for Africa refers to as the "Harvesting Stage", which makes water-scarce regions difficult to aid because of a lack of industrial technology to make solutions sustainable. In addition to the geographic and developmental limiting factors, a number of political, economic reasons also stand in the way of ensuring adequate aid for Africa. Politically, tensions between local governments versus foreign non-governmental organizations impact the ability to successfully bring in money and aid-workers. Economically, urban areas suffer from extreme wealth gaps in which the overwhelming poor often pay four to ten times more for sanitary water than the elite, hindering the poor from gaining access to clean water technologies and efforts. As a result of all these factors, it is estimated that fifty percent of all water projects fail, fewer than five percent of projects are visited, and fewer than one percent have any long-term monitoring.

== Rainwater harvesting ==
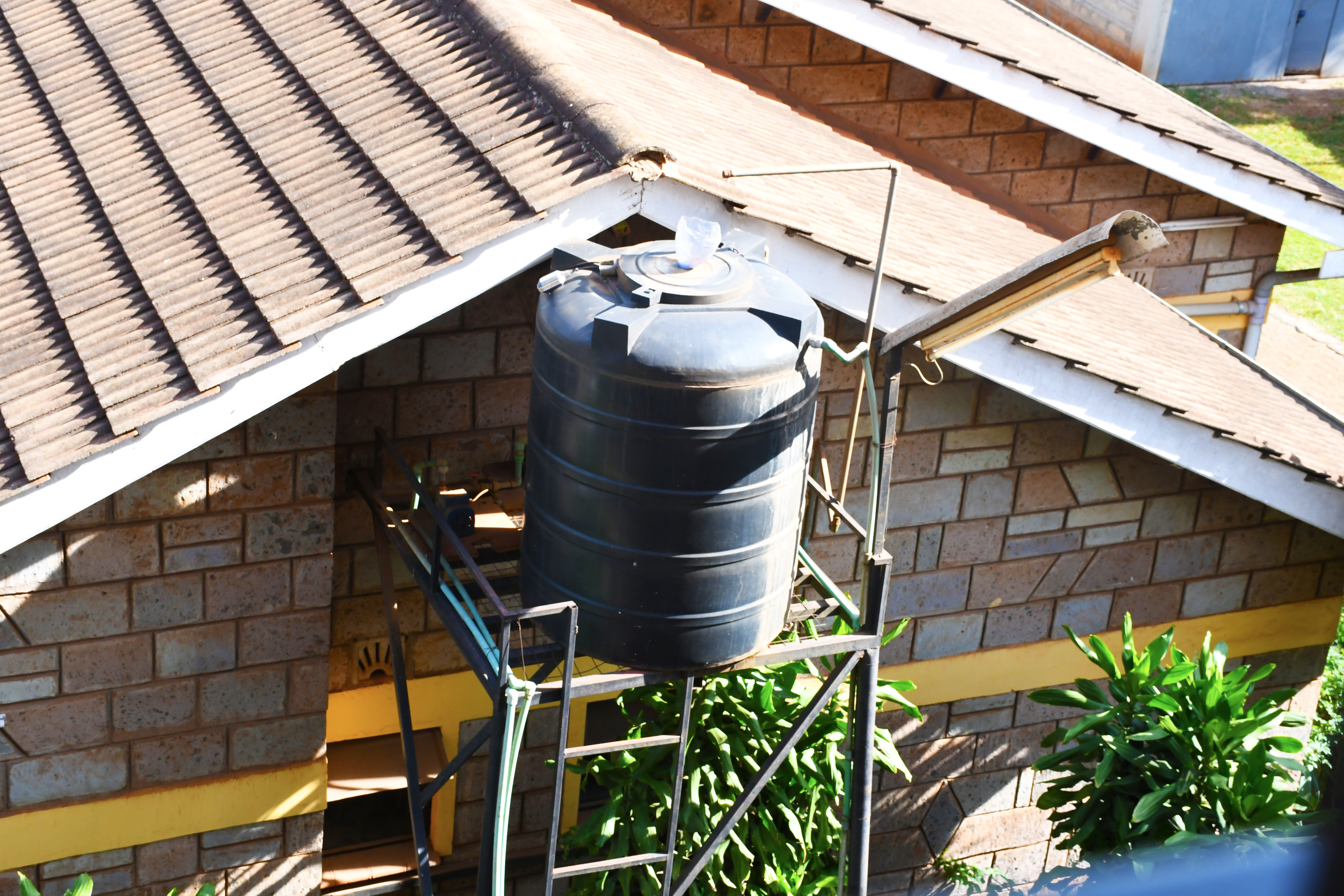
Rain water harvesting-Kenya

Rainwater harvesting (RWH) is the process of gathering and storing rain as opposed to letting it flow off. Rainfall falls on a surfaces such as roof and is directed to replenish the ground water table by seeping down into a tank, cistern, deep pit (well, shaft, or borehole), aquifer, or reservoir using percolation. which is stored and later use for productive purposes. In recognition of the need for improved access to potable water supplies in the developing world, as part of the Millennium Development Goals is to halve the number of people who lack access to potable water by 2015. This led to the adoption and utilization of rainwater harvesting to increase portable water supply. RWH is an option which has historically been adopted in areas where conventional water supply systems have failed to meet the needs of the people.

== Regional variance ==
Northern Africa and Sub-Saharan Africa are progressing towards the Millennium Development Goal on water at different paces. While Northern Africa has 92% safe water coverage, Sub-Saharan Africa remains at a low 60% of coverage—leaving 40% of the 783 million people in that region without access to clean drinking water.

Some of these differences in clean water availability can be attributed to Africa's extreme climates. Although Sub-Saharan Africa has a plentiful supply of rainwater, it is seasonal and unevenly distributed, leading to frequent floods and droughts. Additionally, prevalent economic development and poverty issues, compounded with rapid population growth and rural-urban migration have rendered Sub-Saharan Africa as the world's poorest and least developed region. Thus, this poverty constrains deprive many cities in this region from providing clean water and sanitation services as well as preventing the further deterioration of water quality even when opportunities exist to address these water issues. Additionally, the rapid population growth leads to an increased number of African settlements on flood-prone and high-risk land.

The latest report of the SDG goal 6 has mentioned various facts about water status in sub-Saharan Africa including the lack of hygiene and its impact on the nutritional status especially among children due to increased rate of infectious diseases. Also, almost 1/3 of the sub-Saharan population are in danger of hunger due to lack of access to food. Furthermore, sub-Saharan Africa lacks access to safe drinking water by 76% while only 6% of Europe and Northern America is not covered.

== Examples ==
=== Cape Town, South Africa ===
A city facing a water crisis is Cape Town, South Africa. The government and scientists in the area were preparing for "day zero", meaning that the area was almost completely out of water. The government was hopeful that voluntary conservation efforts and environmental factors would increase the water supply in the reservoirs, but these things did not happen which increased the likelihood of the city running out of potable water. Scientists at the University of Cape Town are concerned because without a water source they are not able to conduct medical research or clinical studies. Day Zero was avoided and restrictions were lifted for residents, but conservation efforts are still in place with uncertainty in rainfall amounts.

=== Madagascar ===
On Madagascar's highland plateau, a massive transformation occurred that eliminated virtually all the heavily forested vegetation in the period 1970 to 2000. Slash-and-burn agriculture eliminated about ten percent of the total country's native biomass and converted it to a barren wasteland. These effects were from overpopulation and the necessity to feed poor indigenous peoples, but the adverse effects included widespread gully erosion that in turn produced heavily silted rivers that "run red" decades after the deforestation. This eliminated a large amount of usable fresh water and also destroyed much of the riverine ecosystems of several large west-flowing rivers. Several fish species have been driven to the edge of extinction and some, such as the disturbed coral reef formations in the Indian Ocean, are effectively lost.

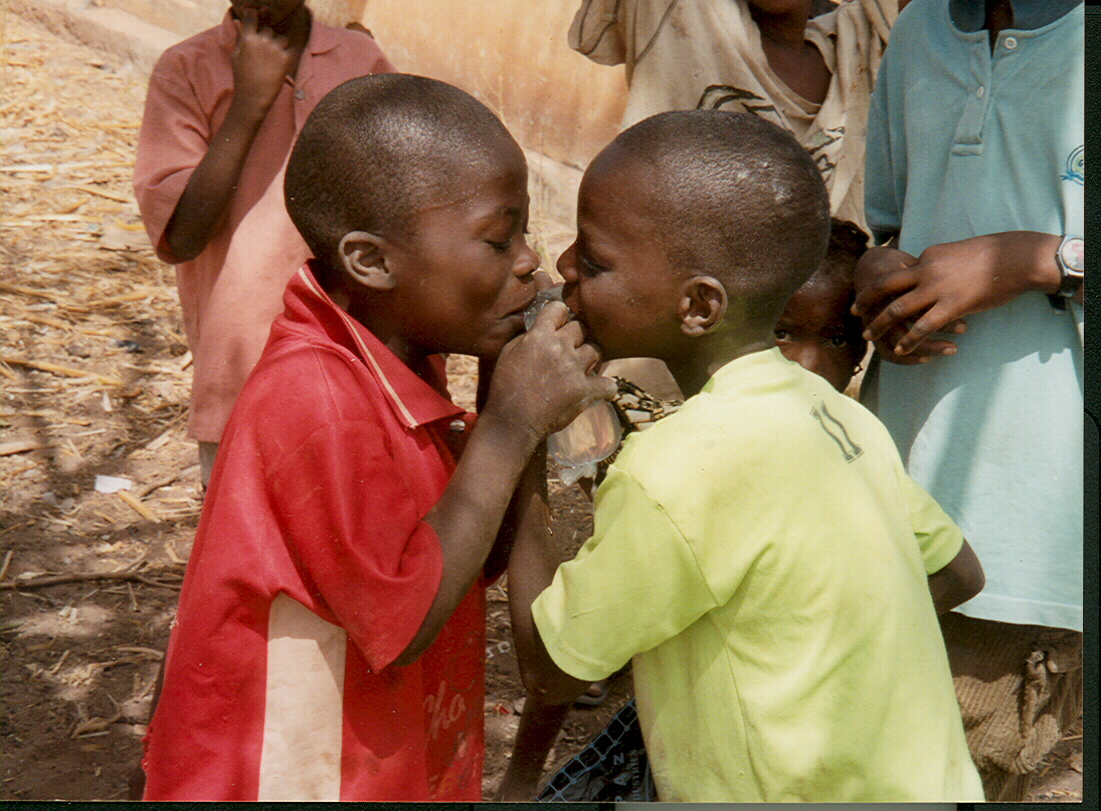
Two children drinking sachet water

=== Nigeria ===
With approximately 199 million people, 33% of Nigerians do not have access to a safe source of drinking water. UNICEF reports that over half of the basic water services for 70% of Nigerians are contaminated. Lack of infrastructure throughout Nigeria prevents most communities from having clean water; a typical Nigerian gets only 9 liters of water on average each day. Because of this, many Nigerians depend on commercially available water such as sachet water or bottled water. Polluted and contaminated groundwater supplies contribute to water scarcity in Nigeria. Some major categories of pollutants include fertilizer and agricultural runoff, poor sewage management systems, industrial waste, oil and gas contaminants, mineral mining by-products and abattoir effluent.

=== Egypt ===
Egypt's growing population and the corresponding rise in water's demand are factors greatly contributing to the nation's water poverty. With the Nile River providing approximately 95% of Egypt's water supply, continuing agricultural projects along the river are further escalating the shortage. Water, Sanitation and Hygiene (WASH) systems are being targeted by UNICEF with goals of reducing water wastage and greenhouse gas emissions. Egypt's government, on the other hand, has put forward the National Water Resources Plan to incorporate agreed upon resource management principles.

=== Morocco ===
Morocco faces severe water scarcity due to climate change, population growth, and increasing agricultural demands. Over the past few decades, rainfall has decreased by about 20%, creating significant challenges, especially in rural areas where around 2.2 million people lack reliable access to clean drinking water. In response, the Moroccan government is building dams, promoting efficient irrigation practices, and investing in desalination plants to diversify water sources. However, climate variability and resource management issues continue to pose significant obstacles to achieving sustainable water access for all.

=== Algeria ===
Ninety-five percent of the population in Algeria has access to drinking water with a majority of 71% of the population having access to safely managed drinkable water, whilst in sub-Saharan countries, such as Ethiopia, the situation differs as only 13.24% of its population has access to clean drinkable water and Central African Republic where that figure is at 6.13%. As of 2018, Algeria possessed 80 barrages, 11 desalination stations, 100 water treatment stations and more than 14,000 water storage stations across the country. As a result, the country has one of the highest rates of access to clean drinking water in Africa, along with the highest percentage of wastewater being safely treated in Africa (76%). However, as the population of the country increases, Algeria has put forth a few projects to ensure that water scarcity does not increase in the future. One of the projects is the construction of seven new desalination plants between 2025 and 2030. The launch of these stations will make it possible to increase the rate of use of desalinated sea water to 42% of the total volume of drinking water compared to the current rate estimated at 18%.

== See also ==
- 2007 African floods
- 2009 West Africa floods
- Atmospheric water generator
- Water crisis in the Democratic Republic of the Congo
- Water issues in developing countries
- Water politics
- Water security
- Rainwater harvesting in the Sahel
