= Baht River =

River in Morocco

Coordinates: 34°21′57.3″N 5°58′44.7″W

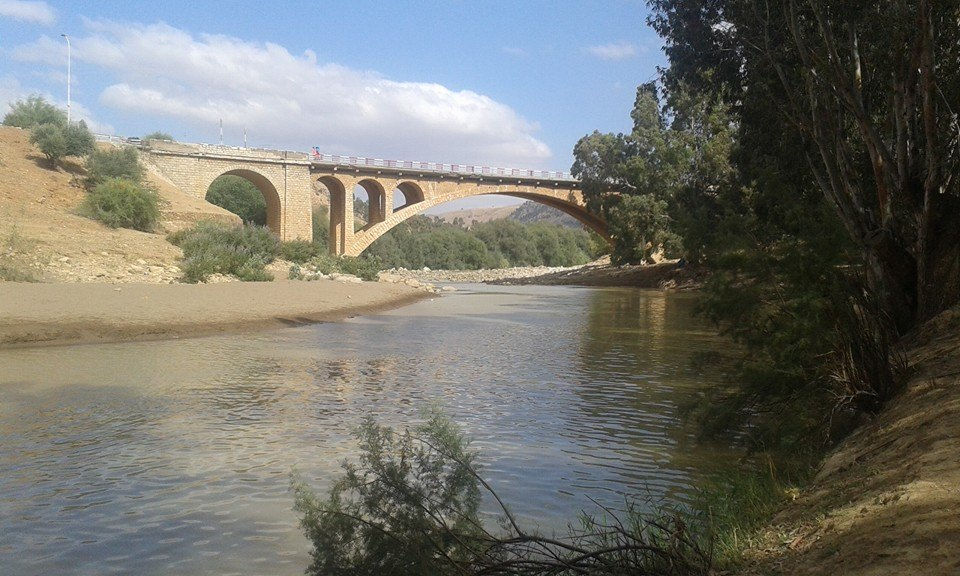
Baht River

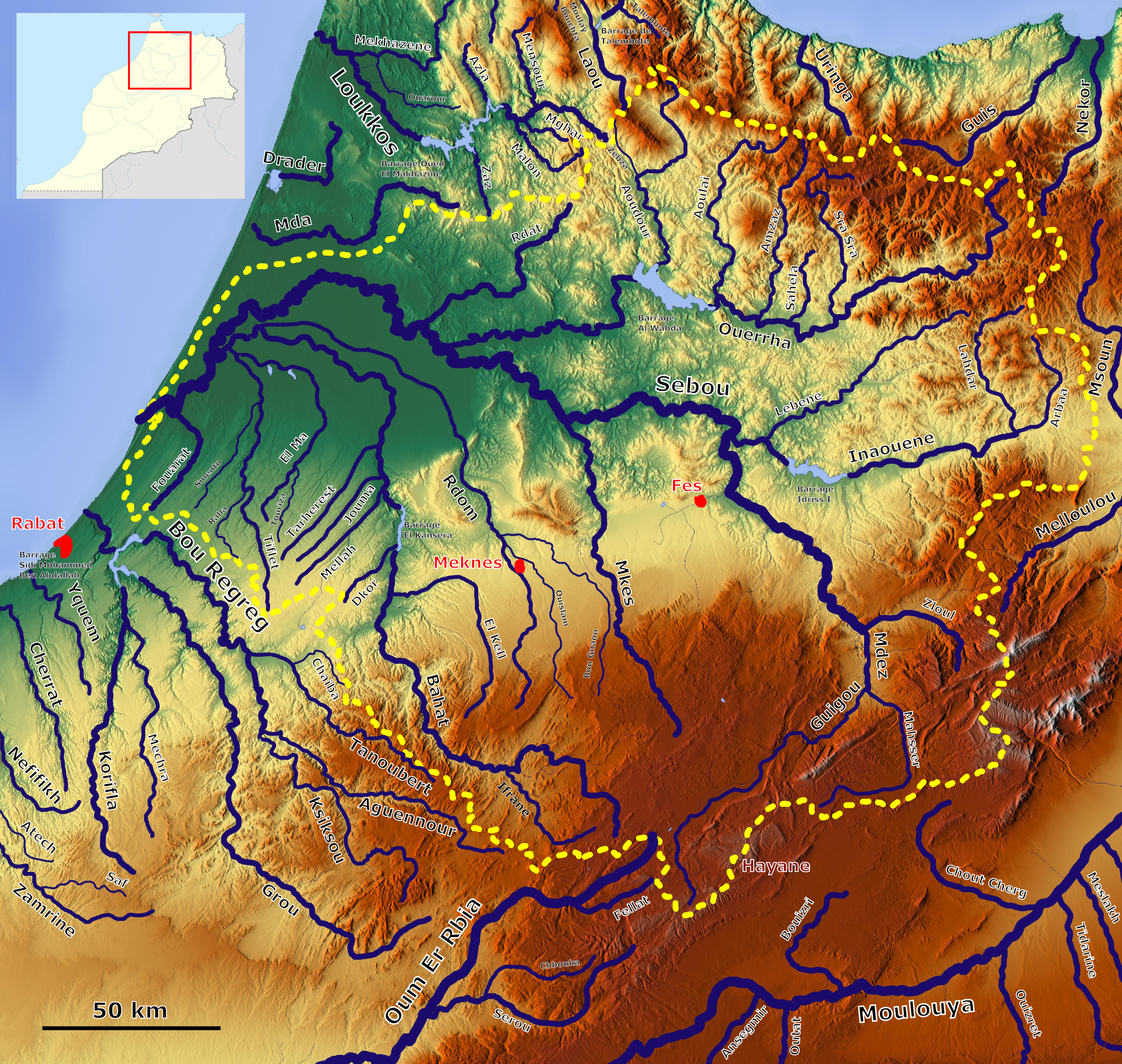
The Sebou River watershed with the oued baht, labeled "Bahat", in the lower left center

The Baht River is a watercourse in Morocco that is a tributary to the Sebou River. Also known as the Oued Beht, this river rises in the Middle Atlas mountain range. The Baht is impounded by the El Kansera irrigation dam about 20 kilometres (12 mi) south of Sidi Slimane.

== Natural history ==
In the upper parts of the watershed within the Middle Atlas is the prehistoric range of the endangered primate Barbary macaque, which prehistorically had a much larger range in North Africa.

== Oued Beht Archaeological Project ==
The Oued Beht Archaeological Project (OBAP) is a multi-national archaeological survey of the Oued Beht archaeological site on the edge of the Baht River, led by Youssef Bokbot (INSAP), Cyprian Broodbank (Cambridge University), and Giulio Lucarini (CNR-ISPC and ISMEO). The investigation identified a Final Neolithic Period (3400 to 2900 BC) site extending up to 10 hectares; "the largest agricultural complex from this period in Africa outside of the Nile region". The site had first been discovered in the 1930s by colonial French, who had found a number of polished stone axes. Since 2021, the OBAP has undertaken investigations at the site.

Evidence uncovered by the archaeologists includes storage pits containing cultivated barley, wheat, peas and legumes, in addition to wild olives and wild pistachios. There was also evidence of domesticated animals such as cattle, sheep, goats and pigs. In addition to macrolithics such as polished axes and grinding implements, almost 1300 prehistoric pottery sherds were collected; this included decorated pieces, with c. 25% slipped and burnished, and up to 7% was "dark-on-light painted pottery".

In 2025, the OBAP was awarded the "Field Discovery Award" at the 6th Shanghai World Archaeology Forum. The Oued Beht, Morocco: a complex early farming society in north-west Africa and its implications for western Mediterranean interaction during later prehistory article won the 2025 Antiquity prize.

== See also ==
- Ouergha River
