= Ouergha River =

River in Morocco

Coordinates: 34°29′10″N 5°21′47″E

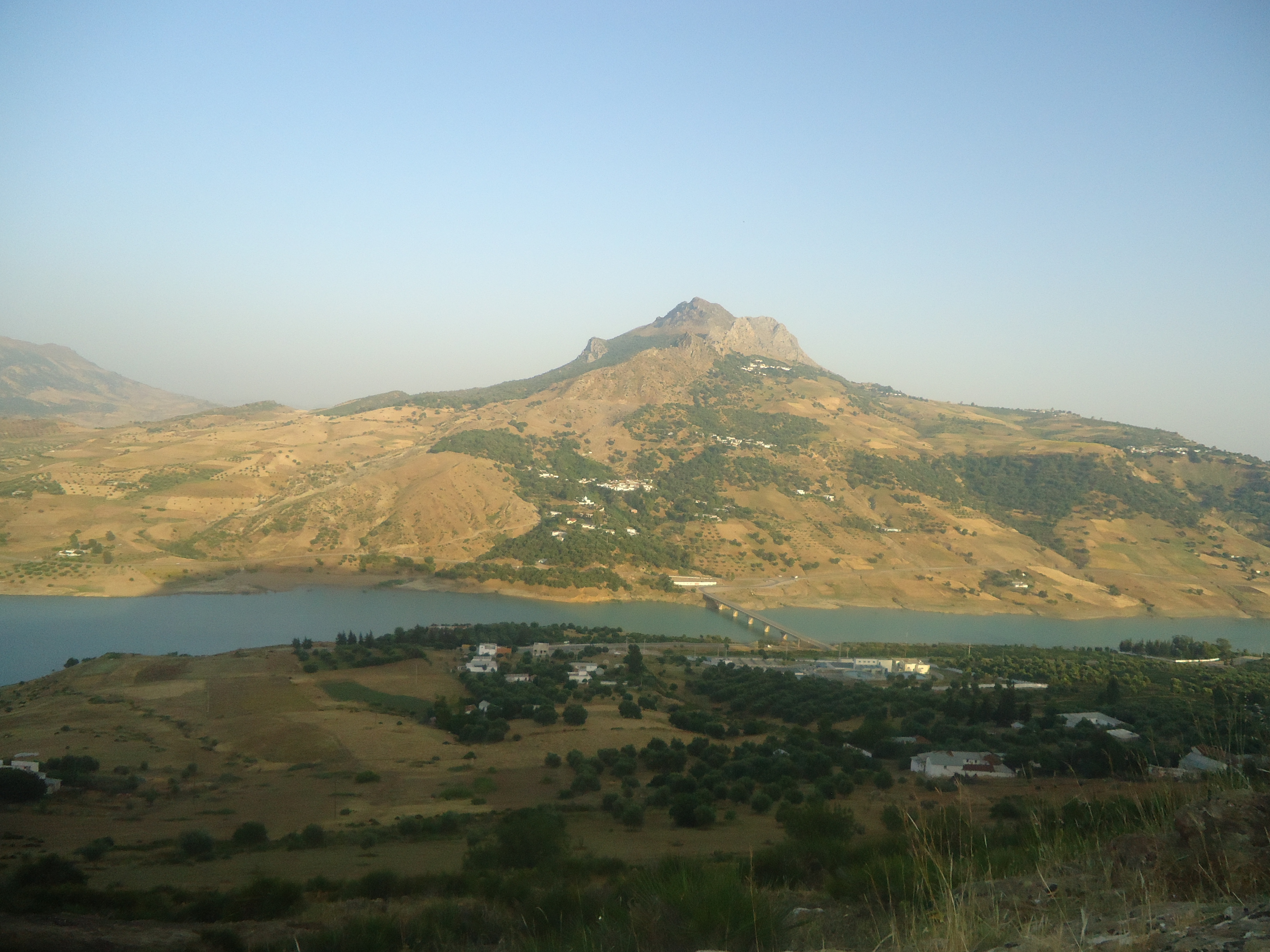
Ouergha River

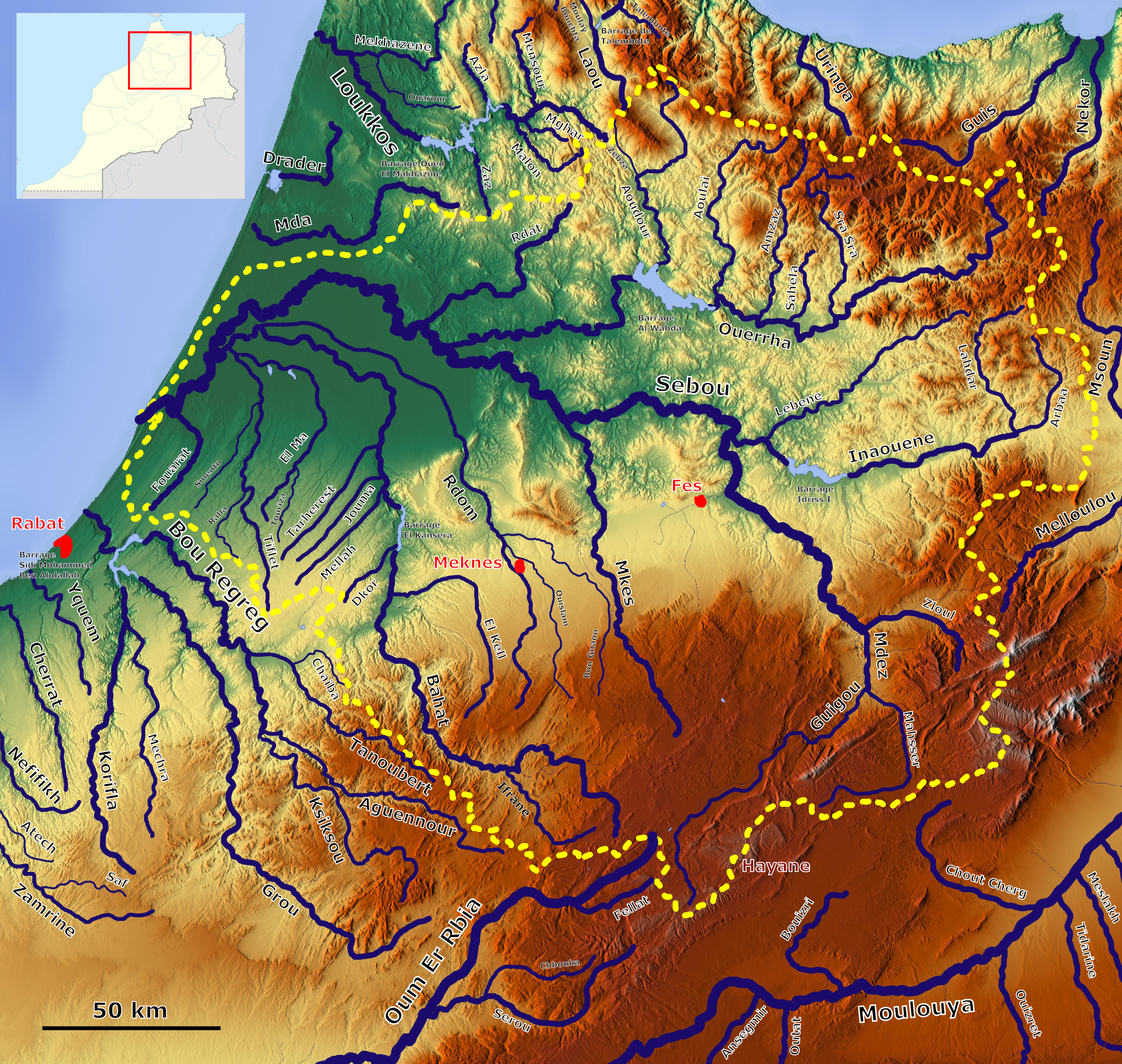
The Sebou River watershed with the oued Ouergha (upper center)

The Ouergha River or Oued Ouerrha (Berber: Asif n Wergha; Arabic:واد ورغة) is a watercourse in Morocco that is a tributary to the Sebou River.

== History ==
The Ouergha River was the site of a key battle in 1925, in which the French attempted to invade the Rif. However despite its significant military power, the French troops could not defeat the Rifian Berber tribal coalition.

== Natural history ==
In the upper parts of the watershed within the Middle Atlas is the prehistoric range of the endangered primate Barbary macaque, which prehistorically had a much larger range in North Africa.

== See also ==
- Baht River
- Middle Atlas
