= Ait Touzine =

Coordinates: 35°07′N 3°38′W

Ait Touzine Ayt Tuzin Beni Touzine
- Tribe
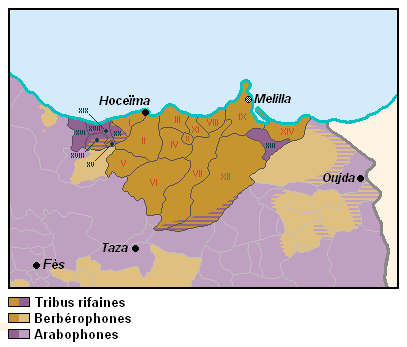
- The Ait Touzine are indicated with IV
- Interactive map of Ait Touzine
- Country: Morocco
- Region: Oriental
- Province: Driouch
- Time zone: UTC+0 (GMT)

The Ait Touzine (Variant forms Beni Touzine, Ayt Tuzin and Beni Tuzin) are one of the biggest Riffian tribes from the central Rif region in Morocco. The name means Children of the half in Berber, possibly implying a mixed origin.

== History ==
=== 13th century ===
In the early 13th century, the Zenata Amazigh Marinids entered the Rif and there they defeated the Almohads in a great battle in 1216. According to Ibn Khaldun, the Marinid leader Abd al-Haqq I married a woman of the Tafersit tribe, but according to Luis del Marmol Carvajal she was of the Ait Touzine tribe. This Riffian woman became the mother of the Marinid sultan Abu Yusuf Yaqub ibn Abd al-Haqq. The Ait Touzine were related to the Marinid rulers of Fes and did not have to pay taxes or tribute.

=== 16th century ===
Leo Africanus mentions in his book "Description of North Africa" (1526) that the Ait Touzine was a fairly prosperous area, where the inhabitants worked their land in complete freedom. Furthermore, one of the king's counselors was a learned man from Ait Touzin. According to Luis del Marmol Carvajal the Ait Touzine are of Zenata origin.

=== 20th century ===
The Ait Touzine tribesmen played an important role during the Rif War in the 1920s. They fought together with the other tribes led by the Riffian resistance fighter Abd el-Krim to fight against the Spanish Invaders. The members of the Ait Touzine tribe went together to Dhar Obaran where they encountered the Riffians of the other tribes: the Ibaqouyen and the Ait Ouriaghel (these two tribes had at the time formed an alliance with the Ait Touzine). This became an important highlight in the Riffian resistance against the Spaniards, namely the Battle of Dhar Obaran. Here the Spaniards were crushed in spectacular fashion. The efforts of all these men had a major influence on the emergence of the Rif Republic. After this great victory of the trio Ait Touzine-Ibeqoyen-Ait Ouriaghel, all the other tribes of the Rif region decided to support the resistance. The tribes gained confidence in the resistance. The number of volunteers kept growing. By all these volunteers from all other tribes, a Riffian unity arose. This united group of Riffians, centered on Ait Ouriaghel and Ait Touzine, once again surprisingly defeated the Spaniards in the Battle of Annual 50 days after the Battle of Dhar Obaran. This battle is better known to the Spaniards as el desastre de Annual. After the Battle of Annual, the Rif Republic was proclaimed through the efforts of all united Riffians.

Nowadays a large number of the Ait Touzine are living in Europe as a result of the migration in the 1970s. Most of them moved to the Netherlands and Belgium.

== Sub tribes ==
The Ait Touzine tribe can be divided into five sub-tribes.

•Igharbiyen (Iferni and Midar and surroundings)

•Ait Akki (from the Nekor valley to the Ighzar Amekrane).

•Ait Beraiez (Ijermaouas and Iwardijen)

•Ait Tsaft (From the Ighzar Nekkur to Kassita)

•Ait Taâban (Surroundings of Tleta Azlaf)

== Geography ==
The territory of the Ait Touzine tribe extends from the Nekour River near Al Hoceima to Driouch and from Temsamane to the Gzenaya tribe.

Beni Touzine is also the name of a caïdat in the cercle of Rif in Driouch Province, Oriental, Morocco.
