= Ait Ourich =

Ait Ourich ⴰⵢⵜ ⵓⵔⵉⵛ Beni Oulichek
- Rif Tribe
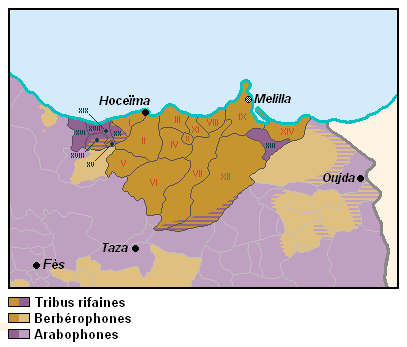
- The Ait Ourich are indicated with XI
- Country: Morocco
- Region: Oriental
- Province: Driouch
- Caidat: Ben Taieb

Ait Ourich (Note: (Also known as; Ait Tourich, Beni Oulichek, Beni Oulichek, Beni Ulichec, Beni Ulishek, Beni Ulishk, Banu Walishak)) (Tarifit: ⴰⵢⵜ ⵓⵔⵉⵛ, Arabic: بني ولشك) is an Amazigh Riffian tribe located in the North-Eastern province of Morocco. Ait (or Aït and Ayt) or Beni is referred to as 'Descendants of' with the latter being the most common form of address of the Oulichek tribe until the recent Arabization in Morocco initiative.

The numerous variations of the written form of Ait Ourich stems from the fact the Rif tribes themselves refer to Ait Ourich in different forms and we can add on to this the written records in Berber, Arabic, French, Spanish and English. What's interesting to note is that the first records of Ait Oulichek in the Rif appear after the Marinid invasion according to Carleton S Coon.

== Language ==
The people of Ait Oulichek speak a dialect of Tarifit (which can also be referred to as "Tamazight"), a northern Berber language.

== Ancestry ==
The fractions and traditional ancestry of the Ait Oulishek are:

Tribe	Faction	Traditional Ancestry
Ait Oulichek	Ben Taieb	Zenata
	Sidi Messaoud	Igharbiyen
	Annual, Dhar Obaran	Indigenous

The Zenatan ancestry seems to be confined to tribes such as Ait Oulichek, Ait Touzine, Tafersit and border groups within the Ait Temsamane and Gzenaya tribe. In fact amongst Riffians the above tribes were called ikharajien, a Tamazight word of Arabic origin meaning "newcomers" or "false promisers".

Igharbiyen (meaning "westerners") are said to be foreigners of Arab origin that have married into the Ait Oulichek tribe. The Igharbiyen are not discriminated against and are allowed equal parts in government. They are few in number.

== Clan Division ==
The Ait Oulichek tribe is composed of 5 clans or factions which are as follows:

1 – Imzilen the descendants of blacksmiths

Imzilen or Imazilen (meaning "the Shameless Ones", singular amazil) are a lower class who in some tribes it is forbidden to marry from them or in others there is social debasement following the Riffian marrying among them. They are considered to be immigrants and of black heritage and they would take on three hereditary of blacksmithing, piping at weddings and acting as public criers, measures and weighers in markets.

2 – Ait Azru the descendants of the rock

3 – Ait Ikhlef (Variant Beni Ijlef) the descendants of those who engage

4 – Ait Jaber (Variant Beni Yebar) the descendants of Jaber

5 – Ait Abdeslam the descendants of Abdeslam

A document released by the Delegation of Indigenous Affairs in 1952 broke the 5 main clans down further.

Factions	Families
Imzilen (17)	Ulad Abderrhman – Tagilast – Iaabdel-laten – Ikeddaren – El Muien – Ijarchichen – Buquedad – Iftaten – Icharkien – Amman Aitzman – Ibenuhen – Laari Uchen – Ibacheríuen – Tanut – Ilbaien – Iscuren – Iuchijen.
Ait Azru (16)	Imdaharíuen – Ulad Mehand U Ahmed – Ait Frasin – Ait Buzian – Ait Abdel-Aali – Idaharien – Imerabten – Isusanen – Talgant – Amháyer – Tarbíaat – Tisbaa – Dar Aarab – Igarraguen – Ifakihen – Ulad Et Táhar.
Ait Ikhlef (14)	Iusfaten – Aadui – Igardoaan – Ait El Jiar – Iharauan – Taztut – Iyar Izmoren – Ijazronen – Tagrut – Izianen – Iyoherien – Izduden – Imaal-laten – Imuchúen.
Ait Jaber (11)	Ait Iarrur – Ait Raho – Ifejaren – Ait Ali – Icaabunen – Ihakkunen – Iaaiaden – Ihiaten – Ulad Mehand U Ali – Iaayuchen – Ikaderíuen.
Ait Abdeslam (10)	Imahmuden – Irandanen – Ulad El Hach Ali – Imalquíuen – Ulad El Hach Mohand – Ifiyusen – Ulad Ben Haddú – Ulad El Hach Ahmed – Iaattaren – Taliuín.

== Spanish Invasion ==
In 1920 the Spanish Army under the orders of General Manuel Fernández Silvestre began a campaign to control all the surrounding regions to Melilla and as a result, were able to subjugate the tribe of Ait Oulichek on 5 December 1920. The Spanish were able to subjugate both the Ait Oulichek and Ait Said tribes by burning their crops and running off their cattle but ultimately chose not to disarm them.

During the Battle of Annual in 1921 the Ait Oulicheck tribe who had aligned themselves with the tribes of Ait Ouriaghel (Abd el-Krim) and Ait Touzin, Temsaman, Ibqqoyn and Tafersit revolted and delivered a major military defeat to the Spanish on 22 July 1921, this battle would almost always be remembered as Disastre de Annual by the Spanish. The exact number of Spanish soldiers present varies from one account to another, some claim it was up to 15,000 and others claim it was 25,000. The number of Riffian's however were as little as 4,000 guerrilla warfare fighters with little to no training and rudimentary weapons. It was said that only 600 Spanish soldiers made it out alive and that most had died during the battle and that General Silvestre had subsequently committed suicide. The Battle of Annual took place on Ait Oulichek territory and the local population of Ait Oulichek had contributed greatly to the Spaniards defeat. With the Spanish now defeated Abd el-krim sought to bring together the tribes of Rif origin and created the short-lived Republic of the Rif (1921 – 1926), they sought independence from Spanish occupation as well as the Moroccan Sultan Yusef ben Hassan.

== Emigration ==
The original members of the Ait Oulichek tribe can now be found mainly in Europe. The years 1964 and 1969 saw the creation of labour agreements for Belgium and the Netherlands respectively, where many people were employed within the Industrial and Mining sectors there. The first wave saw people from the tribes of Temsamane, Ait Oulichek, Ait Touzin, and Ait Said leave mainly for France, many can now be found all over Europe.

== Sources ==
- Coon, Charleton S. (1931). Tribes of the Rif. Harvard African studies.v. 9. University of Harvard.
