= Temsaman =

Temsaman may refer to:

- Temsaman (region), historical region in the Rif, northern Morocco
- Temsamane a commune in the Driouch Province, Oriental administrative region, Morocco
