= Ouardana =

Coordinates: 35°04′N 3°26′W

Ouardana ⵉⵡⴰⵔⴷⴻⵏⴻⵏ وردانة
- commune
- Location of Ouardana in Driouch Province
- Country: Morocco
- Region: Oriental
- Province: Driouch

Area
  - Total: 42.39 km^{2} (16.37 sq mi)

Population (2024)
  - Total: 7,032
  - Density: 165.9/km^{2} (430/sq mi)
- Time zone: UTC+0 (GMT)

Ouardana (Tarifit: Iwardanen ⵉⵡⴰⵔⴷⴻⵏⴻⵏ; Arabic: وردانة) is a commune in Driouch Province of the Oriental administrative region of Morocco. At the time of the 2024 census, the commune had a total population of 7032 people.
