= Rif =

Geographic and cultural region of Morocco

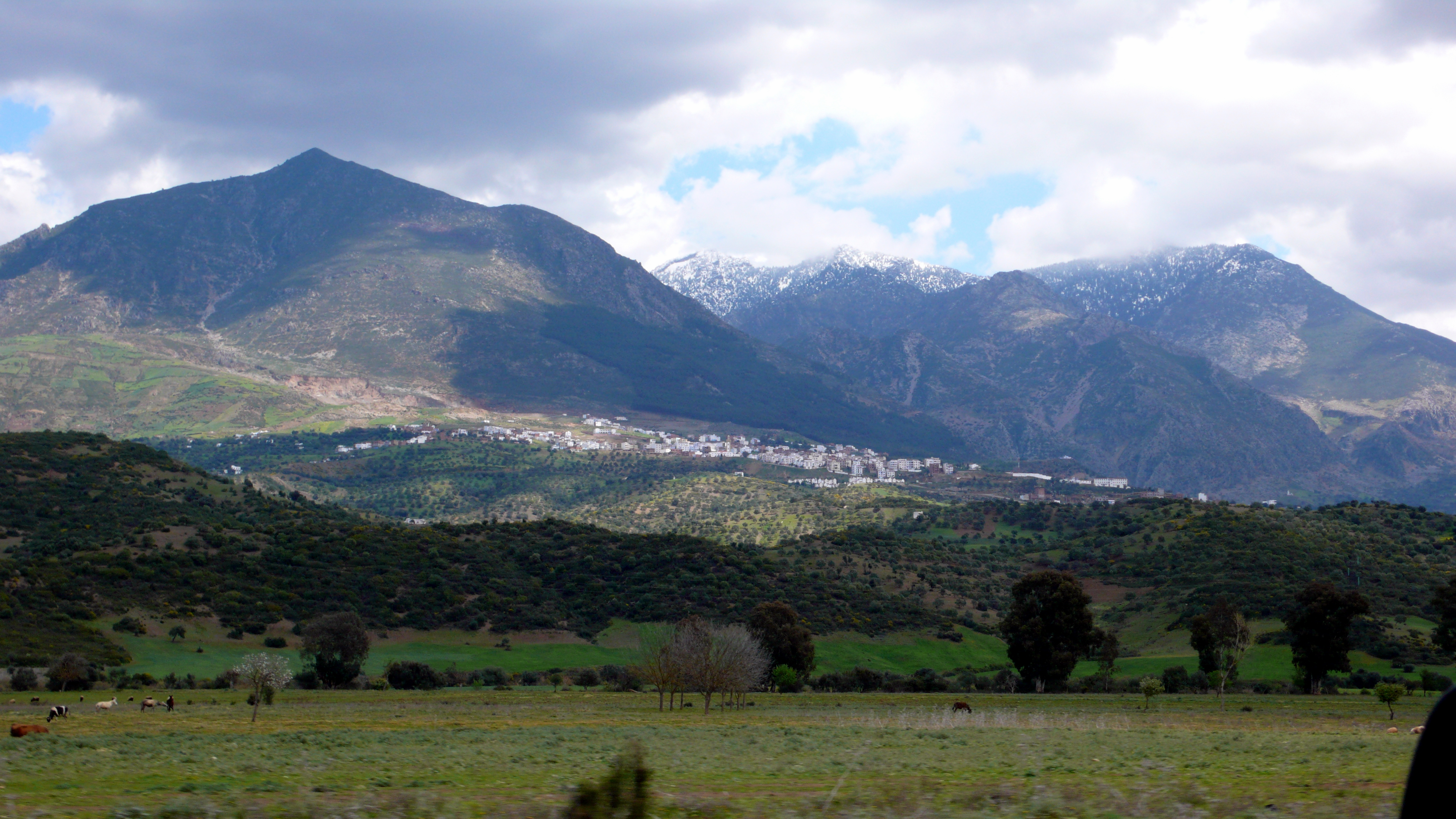
- A view of the Rif mountains around Chefchaouen

Highest point
- Peak: Tidighin
- Elevation: 2,455 m (8,054 ft)

Naming
- Native name: ⴰⵔⵔⵉⴼ (Tarifit); الريف (Arabic)

Geography
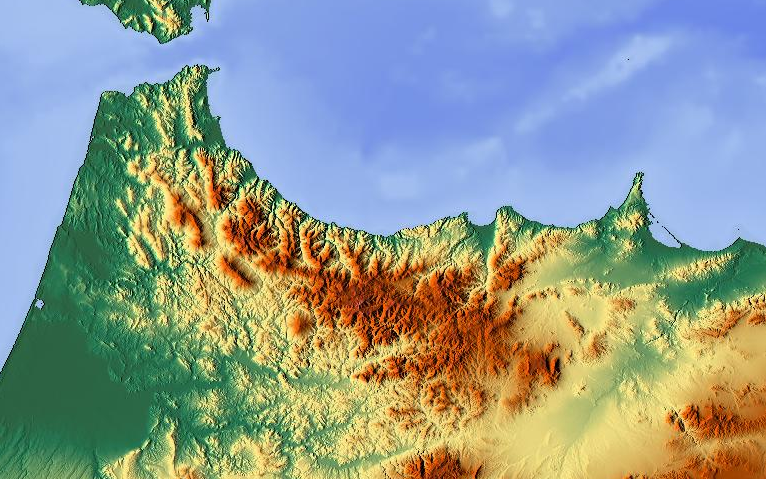
- Map of the Rif in northern Morocco
- Country: Morocco
- Range coordinates: 35°N 4°W

The Rif, (Note: Tarifit: ⴰⵔⵔⵉⴼ, romanized: Arrif, Arabic: الريف) also called the Rif Mountains or Rif Region, is a geographic region in northern Morocco. The region is bounded to the north by the Mediterranean Sea, to the west by the Atlantic Ocean, to the south by the Ouergha River, and to the east by the Moulouya River. The region is the homeland of the Riffians, the Senhaja de Srair, the Jebala, and the Ghomara.

Historically, the Rif was the heart of the Republic of the Rif, led by Abd el-Krim during the Rif War (1920–1927) against Spanish colonial forces. The mountains are divided into the eastern Rif (Nador, Driouch, Al Hoceima) and the western Rif (Tangier, Tétouan, Chefchaouen, Taounate). The western part is often called the Jebala, while the eastern part is referred to as the Rif proper.

Linguistically, the western Rif is predominantly Arabized, with Moroccan Arabic as the main language, though the Ghomara people retain their Ghomara Berber language. The eastern Rif is predominantly Berber, with Tarifit (Riffian) as the main language. In the central Rif (Ketama, Issaguen, Targuist), a Berber-speaking community of Senhaja de Srair exists.

== Geography ==
Geologically, the Rif Mountains belong to the Gibraltar Arc or Alborán Sea geological region. They are an extension of the Baetic System, which includes the mountains of the southern Iberian Peninsula across the strait. Thus, the Rif Mountains are not part of the Atlas Mountain System.

Major cities in the greater Rif region include Nador, Al Hoceima (also called Villa), Imzouren, Driouch, Ben Taieb, Midar and Al Aaroui and a few (small) towns: Segangan, Selwan, Ajdir and Targuist (Targist). And in the Jebala region: Chefchaouen, Taounate, Tetouan, Ouezzane, Tangier and Ksar El Kebir.

== History ==
Flag of the Republic of the Rif (1921–1926).

The Rif has been inhabited by Berbers since prehistoric times. As early as the 11th century BC, the Phoenicians began to establish trading posts and then cities such as Tetouan, Rusadir (now Melilla) and (in the 5th century BC) Tingi (now Tangier).

After the Third Punic War, the coast of North Africa came under the control of Rome, and the Rif became part of the Kingdom of Mauretania. When Mauretania was divided during the rule of Emperor Claudius, Tangier became the capital of Mauretania Tingitana. In the 5th century AD, Roman rule came to an end, and the region was later conquered and partly controlled by the Byzantine Empire.

In 710, Salih I ibn Mansur founded the Emirate of Nekor in the Rif, and the Berbers started converting to Islam. By the 15th century, many Muslims who had converted to Christianity were expelled from Spain, and most of them settled in the western Rif and brought their culture with them, such as Andalusian music, and established the city of Chefchaouen. Afterwards the Rif was the site of numerous battles with Spain and Portugal. In 1415, Portugal invaded Ceuta, and in 1490 Spain conquered Melilla.

The Hispano-Moroccan War broke out in 1859 in Tetouan, and Morocco was defeated. The Spanish-Moroccan conflicts continued in the 20th century, under the leadership of Abd el-Krim, the Berber guerrilla leader who proclaimed the Republic of the Rif in 1921. The Riffian Berbers won several victories over the Spanish in the Rif War in the 1920s before they were eventually defeated; the war saw extensive use of chemical weapons by Spanish forces. The Spanish region was decolonised and restored to Morocco by Spain in April 1956, a month after the French region gained its independence from France. Shortly afterward, the 1958 Rif riots broke out in the north, led by Riffian insurgents. The Moroccan government suppressed the uprising, an event that foreshadowed the broader state repression of the Years of Lead.

== Economy ==
Farmers in the Rif produce most of Morocco's supply of cannabis. The region is economically underdeveloped.

== Environment ==
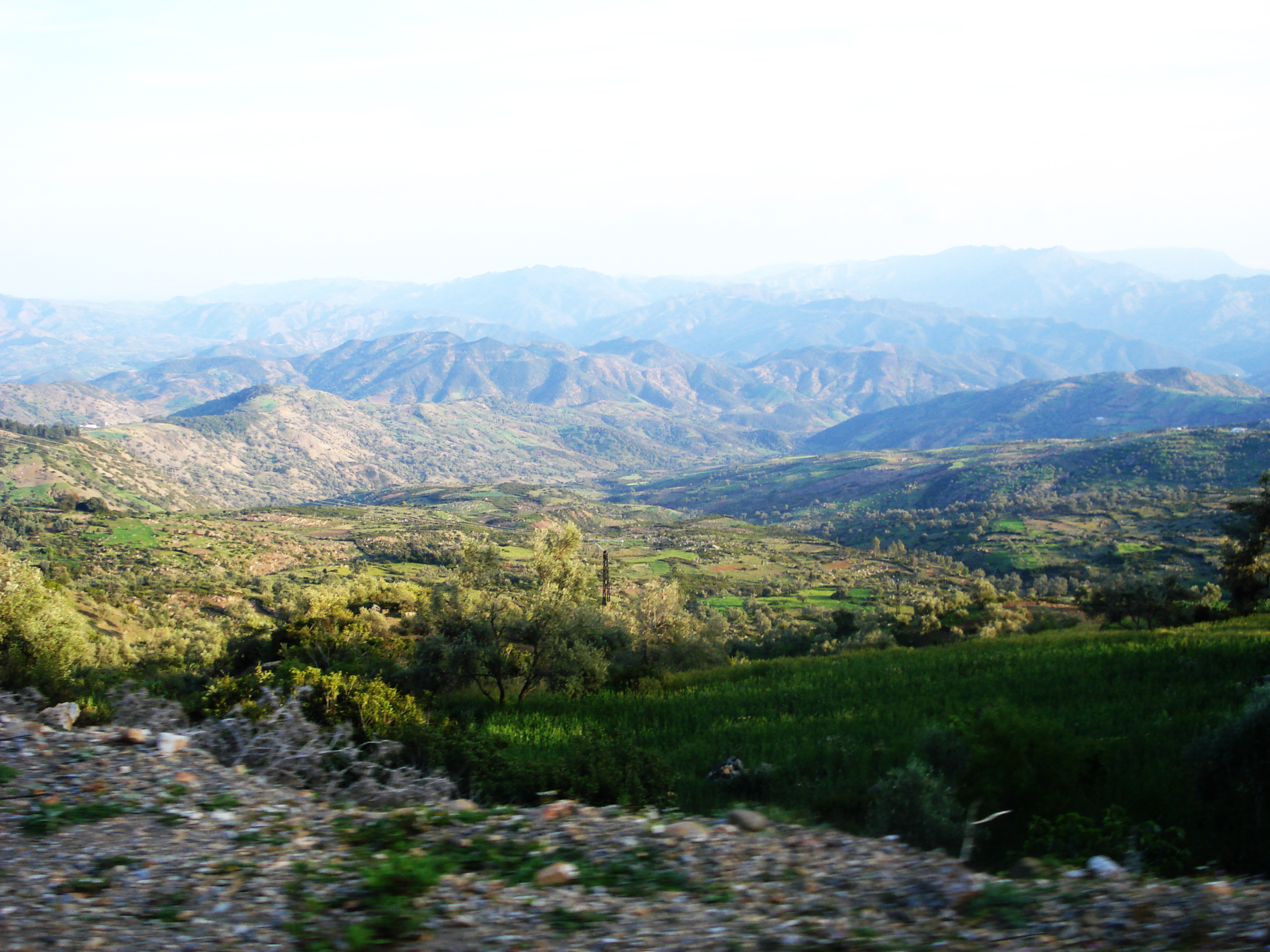
Rif mountains in the province of Ashawen

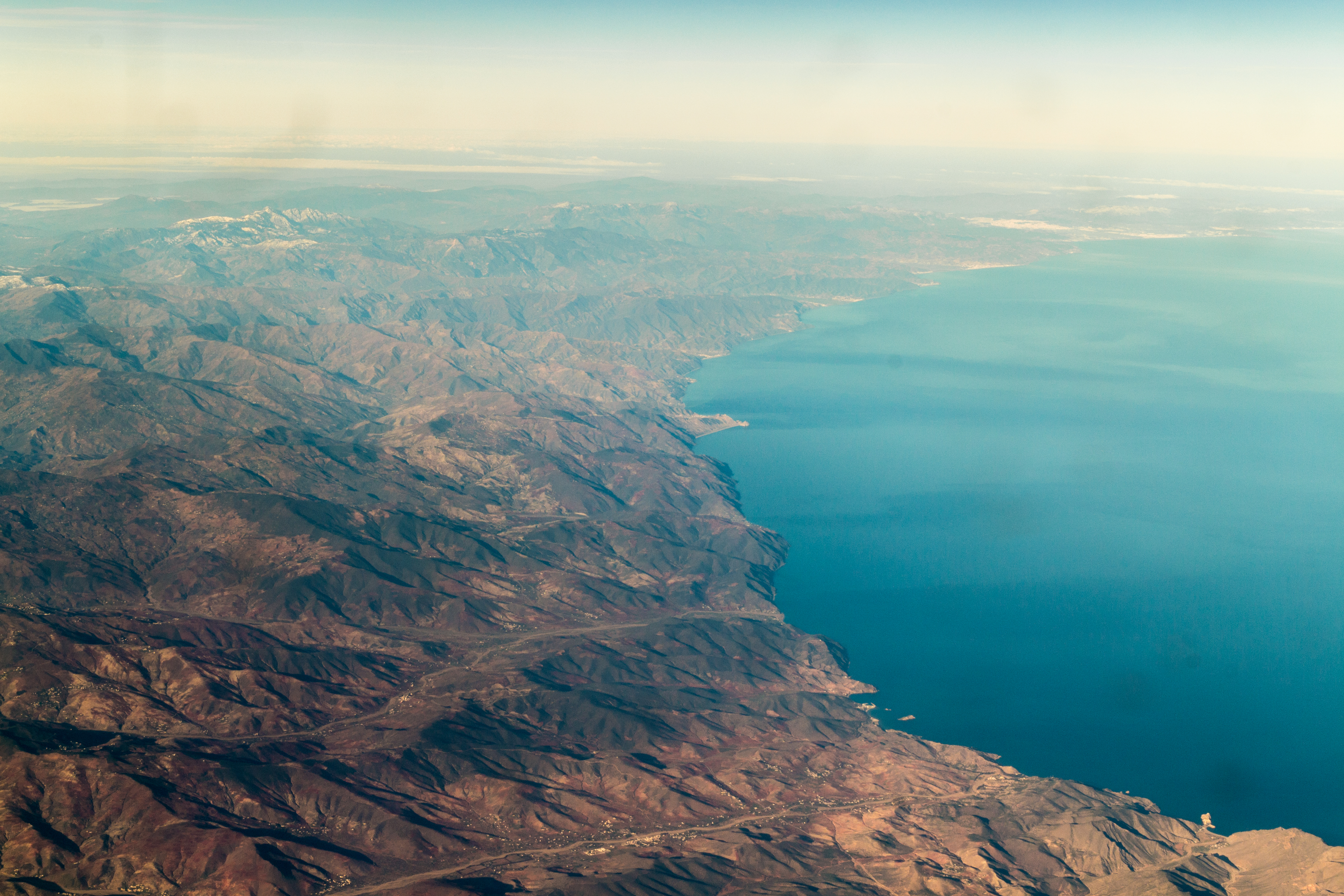
Moroccan Mediterranean coast – aerial view west from Bades over El Jebha to Tétouan with Rif mountains, Tanger-Tetouan-Al Hoceima (2014)

According to C. Michael Hogan, there are between five and eight separate subpopulations of the endangered primate Barbary macaque, Macaca sylvanus. The Rif mountains are also home to the honey bee subspecies Apis mellifera major.

The Rif region receives more rainfall than any other region in Morocco, with some portions receiving upwards of 2,000 millimetres (80 inches) of precipitation a year. The western and central portions are more rainy and are covered in forests of Atlas cedar, cork oak and holm oak, as well as the only remaining forests of Moroccan fir, a subspecies of the Spanish fir. The eastern slopes receive less rainfall, and there forests consist mainly of pines, particularly the Aleppo pine and the maritime pine, as well as tetraclinis.

Massive deforestation due to overgrazing, forest fires, and forest clearing for agriculture, particularly for the creation of cannabis plantations, has taken place since the 1950s. This deforestation has led to soil degradation due to the washing away of topsoil, which has aggravated the process.

== Tribes ==
The Riffians are divided into these tribes and tribal groups:

=== Rif ===
- Gzenaya
- Ait Waryaghar
- Ait Amart
- Ait Touzine
- Ait Temsaman
- Ait Ulishk
- Ait Tafersit
- Ait Said
- Kebdana
- Bokoya
- Ait Itteft
- Ibdarsen
- Galiya

=== Senhaja ===
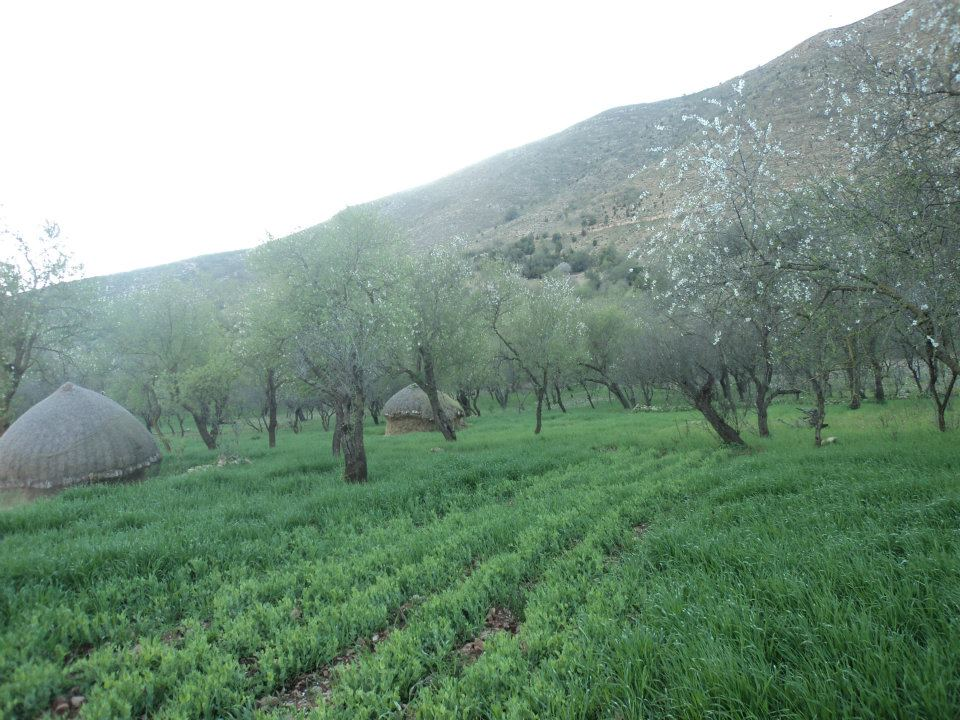
Landscapes in Al Hoceima National Park (Rif).

Northern Senhaja, may be divided into the Senhaja Srair, and the Arabophone Senhaja. The last ones are divided into two groups, The Eastern Arabophone Senhaja & The Western Arabophone Senhaja.

Senhaja Srair:

- Zerqet
- Ait Gmil
- Ait Bunsar
- Ait Khennus
- Ait Seddath
- Ait Ahmed
- Ait Bshir
- Ait Bushibet
- Ait Berber
- Taghzut
- Ketama
- Ait Mezduy
- Targuist

== See also ==
- Ghomaras
- Senhaja Srair
- Hirak Rif
- Iznasen
- Nekor
- Tangier-Tetouan-Al Hoceima
- Oriental (Morocco)
