= Tsaft =

Tsaft ⵜⵙⴰⴼⵜ تسافت
- commune
- Location of Tsaft in Driouch Province
- Coordinates: 34.89°N 3.73°W
- Country: Morocco
- Region: Oriental
- Province: Driouch

Area
  - Total: 150.9 km^{2} (58.3 sq mi)

Population (2024)
  - Total: 8.401
  - Density: 55.69/km^{2} (144.2/sq mi)
- Time zone: UTC+0 (GMT)

Tsaft (Tarifit: ⵜⵙⴰⴼⵜ; Arabic: تسافت) is a commune in Driouch Province of the Oriental administrative region of Morocco. At the time of the 2024 census, the commune had a total population of 8,401 people.
