= Tazaghine =

Coordinates: 35°07′N 4°03′W

Tazaghine ⵜⴰⵣⴰⵖⵉⵏ تزاغين
- commune
- Location of Tazaghine in Driouch Province
- Country: Morocco
- Region: Oriental
- Province: Driouch

Area
  - Total: 56.39 km^{2} (21.77 sq mi)

Population (2024)
  - Total: 3.456
- Time zone: UTC+0 (GMT)

Tazaghine (Tarifit: Tazaɣin, ⵜⴰⵣⴰⵖⵉⵏ; Arabic: تزغين or تزاغين) is a commune in Driouch Province of the Oriental administrative region of Morocco. At the time of the 2024 census, the commune had a total population of 3456 people.
