= Ait Mait =

Ait Mait ⴰⵢⵜ ⵎⴰⵢⵜ آيت مايت
- commune
- Location of Ait Mait in Driouch Province
- Coordinates: 35.09°N 3.38°W
- Country: Morocco
- Region: Oriental
- Province: Driouch

Area
  - Total: 145.7 km^{2} (56.3 sq mi)

Population (2024)
  - Total: 4,721
  - Density: 32.4/km^{2} (84/sq mi)
- Time zone: UTC+0 (GMT)

Ait Mait (Tarifit: ⴰⵢⵜ ⵎⴰⵢⵜ; Arabic: آيت مايت) is a commune in Driouch Province, Oriental, Morocco. At the time of the 2024 census, the commune had a total population of 4721 people.
