= Oulad Amghar =

Coordinates: 35°15′N 3°39′W

Oulad Amghar ⵡⵍⴰⴷ ⴰⵎⵖⴰⵔ أولاد أمغار
- commune
- Location of Oulad Amghar in Driouch Province
- Country: Morocco
- Region: Oriental
- Province: Driouch

Area
  - Total: 63.13 km^{2} (24.37 sq mi)

Population (2024)
  - Total: 5,755
  - Density: 91.16/km^{2} (236.1/sq mi)
- Time zone: UTC+0 (GMT)

Oulad Amghar (Tarifit: ⵡⵍⴰⴷ ⴰⵎⵖⴰⵔ; Arabic: أولاد أمغار) is a commune in the Driouch Province of the Oriental administrative region of Morocco. At the time of the 2024 census, the commune had a total population of 5755 people.
