= M'Hajer =

M'Hajer ⵎⵀⴰⵊⴻⵔ امهاجر
- commune
- Location of M'hajer in Driouch Province
- Coordinates: 35.12°N 3.49°W
- Country: Morocco
- Region: Oriental
- Province: Driouch

Area
  - Total: 105.4 km^{2} (40.7 sq mi)

Population (2024)
  - Total: 8,008
  - Density: 75.98/km^{2} (196.8/sq mi)
- Time zone: UTC+0 (GMT)

M'Hajer (Tarifit: ⵎⵀⴰⵊⴻⵔ; Arabic: امهاجر) is a commune in Driouch Province of the Oriental administrative region of Morocco. At the time of the 2024 census, the commune had a total population of 8008 people.
