= Trougout =

Trougout ⵜⵔⵓⴳⴳⵓⵜ تروكوت
- commune
- Location of Trougout in Driouch Province
- Coordinates: 35.18°N 3.77°W
- Country: Morocco
- Region: Oriental
- Province: Driouch

Area
  - Total: 111.2 km^{2} (42.9 sq mi)

Population (2024)
  - Total: 11,348
  - Density: 102.1/km^{2} (264/sq mi)
- Time zone: UTC+0 (GMT)

Trougout (Tarifit: ⵜⵔⵓⴳⴳⵓⵜ; Arabic: تروكوت) is a commune in Driouch Province, Oriental, Morocco. At the time of the 2024 census, the commune had a total population of 11,348 people.
