= Oulad Boubker =

Oulad Boubker ⵡⵍⴰⴷ ⴱⵓⴱⴽⴻⵔ أولاد بوبكر
- commune
- Location of Oulad Boubker in Driouch Province
- Coordinates: 34.85°N 3.39°W
- Country: Morocco
- Region: Oriental
- Province: Driouch

Area
  - Total: 281.6 km^{2} (108.7 sq mi)

Population (2024)
  - Total: 3,703
  - Density: 13.15/km^{2} (34.1/sq mi)
- Time zone: UTC+0 (GMT)

Oulad Boubker or Ait Boubker (Tarifit: ⵡⵍⴰⴷ ⴱⵓⴱⴽⴻⵔ; Arabic: اولاد بوبكر) is a commune in the Driouch Province of the Oriental administrative region of Morocco. At the time of the 2024 census, the commune had a total population of 3703 people.
