= Boudinar =

Coordinates: 35°09′N 3°38′W

Boudinar ⴱⵓⴷⵉⵏⴰⵔ بودينار
- commune
- Location of Boudinar in Driouch Province
- Country: Morocco
- Region: Oriental
- Province: Driouch

Area
  - Total: 87.03 km^{2} (33.60 sq mi)

Population (2024)
  - Total: 7.996
  - Density: 91.88/km^{2} (238.0/sq mi)
- Time zone: UTC+0 (GMT)

Boudinar (Tarifit: ⴱⵓⴷⵉⵏⴰⵔ; Arabic: بودينار) is a commune in Driouch Province of the Oriental administrative region of Morocco. At the time of the 2024 census, the commune had a total population of 7996 people.
