= Riffians =

Berber ethnic group

Irifiyen / ⵉⵔⵉⴼⵉⵢⵏ الريفيون
- Flag of the Republic of the Rif Accociated by Riffians and the Riffian National Party

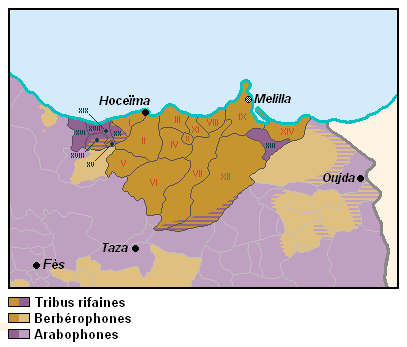

Total population
- Around 1.2 million (3.2% of Moroccan population; 2024 census)

Languages
- Native: Tarifit; Other: Arabic (Moroccan)

Religion
- Sunni Islam

Related ethnic groups
- Other Berber people

Riffians or Rifians (Tarifit: Irifiyen; Arabic: الريفيون, colloquially pronounced Rifyon) are a Berber ethnic group indigenous to the Rif region of northeastern Morocco and the Spanish enclave of Melilla. Communities of Riffians are also found in southern Spain, France, the Netherlands, and Belgium, as well as elsewhere in Western Europe. Riffians are predominantly Sunni Muslims and primarily speak Tarifit.

== Name and etymology ==
The term Rīf (الريف) is an Arabic term that literally means "cultivated land" or "countryside". After independence younger Riffians increasingly opted to use the name Irifiyen over tribal identification, as they became more aware of other groups in the country. Anthropologist David Montgomery Hart suggested that before sustained contact with the European world, the term Imazighen may have been the exclusive self-designation.

In contemporary usage Irifiyen typically denotes all Berber speakers in northeastern Morocco, with the possible exception of the western Senhaja de Srair and the eastern Beni Snassen. Historically the term had a more limited scope and did not include the Iqer'iyen around Nador. Nowadays both the wider and the narrower meaning of the term are current in the region.

== History ==
=== Riffians ===
According to Carleton S. Coon the earliest written reference that may possibly refer to the Riffians is found in an inscription from a tomb of the Eighteenth Dynasty of ancient Egypt. It reports an invasion of Egypt by a Libyan group called the Mashausha. Before this, the Mashausha had subjugated the Tehenu, until then the only Libyan population group known to the Egyptians, and had incorporated them into the campaign against Egypt. The Mashausha are described as coming from the west. This account may be connected with the name of the Mazuza, a subgroup of the present-day Iqer'iyen, who are counted among the Riffians. However, it cannot be ruled out that several groups bore the name Mazuza at that time. Perhaps the only positive reference to the Riffians in the classical Roman period shows them not only unsubjugated by Rome, but actually, in the time of Marcus Aurelius, attacking the Romans and carrying the war into Spain.

=== Early and medieval history ===
In 710 Salih I ibn Mansur founded the emirate of Nekor with its capital nekor, close to modern-day Temsamane.

In the 1526 Cosmographia et geographia de Affrica Leo Africanus, lists 'er Rif' as one of the regions of the Kingdom of Fez.

=== Ripublik ===
Ripublik is a term of European origin denoting the period of Riffian history preceding the establishment of the Rif Republic.

=== Rif War and Rif Republic ===
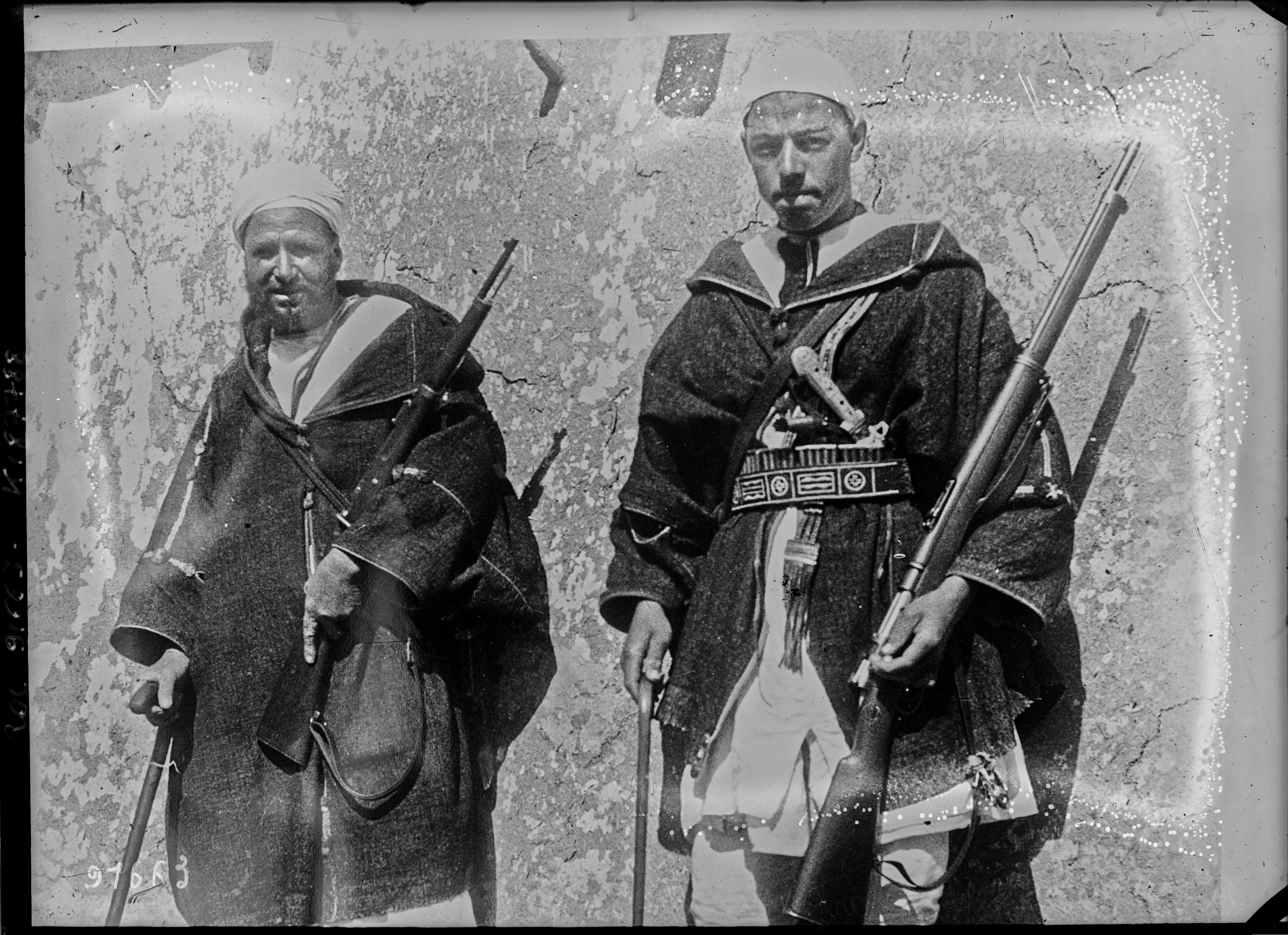
Riffian leader Caid Sarkash and his son with weapons taken from Spanish soldiers, c. 1924

Riffians have fought in numerous wars throughout their history. During the Rif War (1921–1926), Riffian forces inflicted heavy losses on the Royal Spanish army, while also sustaining severe casualties, particularly after the French intervention and Spain's use of chemical weapons, among the first such uses in modern warfare.

=== Post-independence ===
During the 1960s, poverty rates and infant mortality rates among Riffians were high. This was largely a consequence of the 1958 Rif riots, which led to the region being subjected to military rule for several years, as well as its official neglect and marginalization by Moroccan authorities for decades, pressuring its population to emigrate to Europe. The Rif remains one of the poorest areas in Morocco.

In the decades following the 1958 riots, the Rif region has witnessed popular demonstrations demanding better education, healthcare and job opportunities, most notably in the 1984 Bread Uprising. A resurgent Riffian popular movement in 2010, protests in 2013 and protests in 2017 against hogra – a humiliating treatment by an abusive state – have drawn public attention, as well as claims of brutal suppression by Moroccan authorities.

== Culture ==
=== Clothing ===
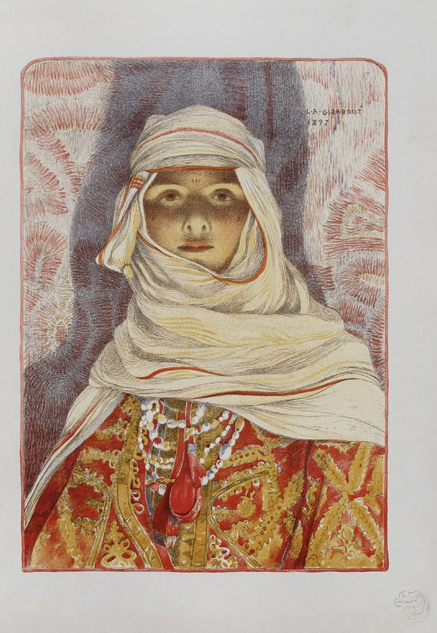
Woman of the Rif by Louis-Auguste Girardot

Historically, the djellaba of the Riffians differed from that of the Jebala and the Ghomara. Although similarly short, it had narrower sleeves and hoods and was unlined. Today, Riffian men wear a white cotton turban (ariziṯ) that is tightly wrapped around the head covering all of it.

Up until the end of the nineteenth century, the main garment worn by Riffian women was the haik. The haiks of the Rif were plain or had a few simple cotton stripes at the end. They were worn with belts that were often decorated with tie-dye designs.

=== Language ===
Riffians speak Tarifit, which belongs to the Zenati group of Berber languages. Many Riffians additionally speak Moroccan Arabic and Spanish. Nineteen Riffian social units are known: five in the west along the Mediterranean coast which speak Riffian and Moroccan Arabic; in the central area, seven groups exist, of which one speaks mainly Moroccan Arabic and the rest speak Riffian; five in the east and two in the southeastern desert area also speak Riffian.

== Religion ==
Modern-day Riffians are predominantly Muslim. However, some pre-Islamic beliefs and practices survived among Riffian communities until relatively recently. In the early 20th century, some Riffians traditionally distinguished nine types of supernatural beings:

1. Malakin: Angels of the Abrahamic religions.
2. Jnun: Jinn.
3. Khier: Ghosts believed to be tall and thin and to travel through cemeteries at night.
4. Thasadunt imthran: A man-eating female mule believed to pass through cemeteries at night.
5. Er riah: A baleful hot summer whirlwind.
6. Thamza: Also called Stut, a man-eating ogress believed to be capable of changing her form.
7. Amziw: A man-eating ogre and the husband of Thamza.
8. Bu sibba ijitjen: The father of the seven heads, a fire-breathing, mule-sized beast with seven human heads.
9. Hajuj u Majuj: See Ya'juj and Ma'juj. They were described as dwarfs living in underground caves who sought to reach the surface and cause destruction. Each day they attempted to break through the ground, but gave up at night. According to the belief, they would eventually succeed after saying "Inshallah" before attempting to break through.

During the 1920s, some Riffians reportedly believed that Thamza, Amziw, and Bu sibba ijitjen had once existed but had died long ago and could no longer be found.

== Society ==
According to Irina Casado i Aijon, Riffians have historically organized themselves under "patrilineality and patrilocality principles." The oldest man in the household commands authority and responsibility for decisions, while women jointly care for the young and sick without discrimination. Like other Berber groups, temporary migration is a traditional practice. The Riffians have been a significant source of Moroccan emigrants to European countries such as the Netherlands, Belgium, Spain, and Germany.

The Riffians have lived a largely settled, agricultural lifestyle, using hand tools, oxen and cattle to plow the steeply terraced land in their valleys. Horticultural produce, along with sheep and goat meat, cheese, and milk have provided their traditional sustenance. Some Riffians have practiced sardine seining along the Mediterranean coast.

== Tribes and tribal groups ==
The Riffians are divided into the following tribes and tribal groups:

- Ait Ammart
- Ait Boufrah
- Ait Bouyahyi
- Ait Itteft
- Ait Ourich
- Ait Said
- Ait Tafersit
- Ait Temsamane
- Ait Touzine
- Ait Waryaghar
- Ibaqouyen
- Ibdarsen
- Igzenayen
- Ikebdanen
- Iqer'iyen
- Mestassa

== Notable people ==
- Abd el-Krim, Moroccan political and military leader.
- Ibrahim Afellay, Dutch former footballer of Moroccan origins.
- Sofyan Amrabat, Moroccan footballer.
- Nordin Amrabat, Moroccan footballer.
- Mohammed Ameziane, Moroccan Qaid and military leader.
- Farid Bang, German Musician.
- Hakim Benchamach, Moroccan politician.
- Jamal Ben Saddik, Belgian Moroccan kickboxer.
- Mohamed Choukri, Moroccan author.
- Brahim Diaz, Moroccan footballer
- Munir El Haddadi, Moroccan footballer.
- Ilyas El Omari, Moroccan author.
- Youssef Mokhtari, Moroccan footballer.
- Namika, Moroccan German singer.
- Najat Vallaud-Belkacem, Moroccan French politician.
- Ahmed Aboutaleb, Dutch politician and mayor of Rotterdam.

== See also ==
- Ghomara language
- Senhaja de Srair language
- Senhaja de Srair in the Central Rif
- Beni Iznasen in the Eastern Rif
- Beni Snous Tlemcen, Western Algeria

== Sources ==
- Hart, David M. (1976). The Aith Waryaghar of the Moroccan Rif: An Ethnography and History. Wenner-Gren Foundation for Anthropological Research. ISBN 978-0-8165-0452-7.
