= Bni Marghnine =

Bni Marghnine بني مرغنين
- commune
- Location of Bni Marghnine in Driouch Province
- Coordinates: 35.18°N 3.57°W
- Country: Morocco
- Region: Oriental
- Province: Driouch

Area
  - Total: 41.14 km^{2} (15.88 sq mi)

Population (2024)
  - Total: 4,950
  - Density: 119.5/km^{2} (310/sq mi)
- Time zone: UTC+0 (GMT)

Bni Marghnine (Arabic: بني مرغنين) is a commune in Driouch Province of the Oriental administrative region of Morocco. At the time of the 2024 census, the commune had a total population of 4950 people.
