= Ait Waryaghar =

Large Riffian tribe of northeastern Morocco

Ait Waryaghar ⴰⵢⵜ ⵡⴰⵔⵢⴰⵖⴻⵔ
- Tribe
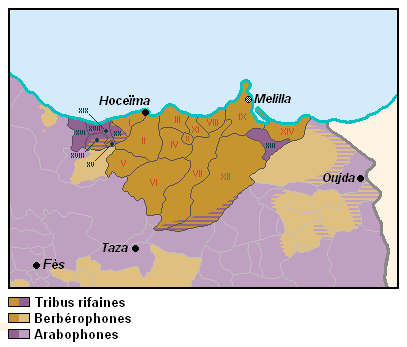
- The Ait Waryaghar are indicated with II
- Country: Morocco
- Region: Tanger-Tetouan-Al Hoceima
- Province: Al Hoceima
- Time zone: UTC+1 (CET)

The Ait Waryaghar or Ait Ouriaghel (Berber: ⴰⵢⵜ ⵡⴰⵔⵢⴰⵖⴻⵔ) is one of the biggest Riffian tribes of the Rif region of the north-eastern part of Morocco and one of the most populous. They inhabit most of the territory around the city of Al Hoceima. The Ait Waryaghar speak the "Western-Tarifit" dialect of the Riffian language.

The Ait Waryaghar were the main group which participated in the Rif wars (see Republic of the Rif) against the Spanish Protectorate in Morocco at the beginning of 20th century. The Spanish authorities considered it the nucleus of insumisión to the colonial authority in the Eastern zone of the protectorate (see Battle of Annual).

During the Rif War of 1921-1926, the leadership of the Ait Waryaghar was concentrated in the Al-Khattabi family and, in particular, in Muhammad bin Abd el-Krim al-Khattabi. Its centre was the small locality of Ajdir in the bay of Al Hoceima. Muhammad bin Abd el-Krim al-Khattabi made an alliance with the tribesmen of the Ait Touzine tribe to stop the Spaniards at the Nekor river in Temsamane.

== Etymology ==
The word Ait or Aith means "people of" or "inhabitant of" referring to a place. In Moroccan Arabic, it was translated as Bni. According to anthropologist David Montgomery Hart, Waryaghar derives from the Tamazight adjective awragh which refers to the colour yellow.

== History ==
Before modern times, few information was available concerning the tribe. Mr. Abd-el-krim Al Khattabi, leader of the confederation of the united tribes of the rif during the colonisation, was born in this tribe in the town of Ajdir. In account of the tribe, the Spanish military army has overgone its hardest defeat during the Anoual battle, causing the death of more than thousands people. The Ait Ouriaghel/Aït Wayagher tribe was the biggest and the more powerful one of the Rif.

In 1958, during the Rif uprising asking for better living conditions, better health care and paved roads, the Ait Ouriaghel tribe has rebelled and was severely punished by the Morocco King Hassan II who sent the army to the Rif and ordered them to massacre as much as possible riffians.

Since 1950s, the Al Hoceima province in which belongs the Ait Ouriaghel, have supplied an important continguent of emigrante worker for the Netherlands, France, Belgium and Spain as well as the town of Tanger.

== Khmas system ==
The Ait Waryaghar like other large Berber tribes in Morocco were traditionally segmented into khams khmas ("five fifths"):

Khoms I:

- Ait Yusif w-'Ari
  - Ait Ughir Izan
- Ait 'Ari
  - Isrihan

Khoms II:

- Ait 'Abdallah
  - Ait 'Aru Musa
  - Ait Tmajurth

Khoms III:

- Ait Bu 'Ayyash
  - Ait Bu 'Ayyash
  - Ait 'Adhiya

Khoms IV:

- Ait Hadhifa
  - Ait Bu Jdat
  - Iraqraqen
  - Ait 'Arus
  - I'Akiyyen

Khoms V:

- Imrabdhen (Intrusive group)
  - Imrabdhen n-Dara (Upper Imrabdhen)
  - Imrabdhen n-Waddai (Lower Imrabdhen)

After the independence of Morocco in 1956 there was a national board regime implemented, while the previously applicable khmas system became discontinued.

== Geography ==
The tribe of the Ait Waryaghar covers a large area in the center of the Rif. The Ait Waryaghar borders on the following tribes:

- western: Targuist, Ait Mezdoui and Ait Itteft.
- eastern: Temsamane and Ait Touzine.
- northern: Ibaqouyen.
- southern: Igzenayen and Ait Ammart.

These are the biggest cities that belong to the tribe of the Ait Waryaghar:

- Al Hoceima (57.000 residents), southern part of this city is situated on Ait Waryagher territory.
- Imzouren (34.000 residents)
- Bni Bouayach (18.000 residents)
- Ait Youssef Ou Ali
- Ajdir (5.000 residents)

== Famous people from the Ait Wayagher ==
- Abd el-Krim, military leader and president of the anti-colonial Rif Republic
- Nasser Zefzafi, Political activist who was sentenced to 20 years in prison
- Omar Khattabi, surgeon and political leader tortured during the 1970s.
- Mohammed Ziane, Politician and lawyer
- Mohamed Mrabet, storyteller
- Abdelkader Ouaraghli, former international goalkeeper
- Mounir El Hamdaoui, Dutch-born Moroccan football player

== Bibliography ==
- Hart, David Montgomery (1976). The Aith Waryaghar of the Moroccan Rif: An Ethnography and History. U. of Arizona P. ISBN 978-0-8357-5290-9.
