= Ain Zohra =

Ain Zohra عين الزهرة
- commune
- Location of Ain Zohra in Driouch Province
- Coordinates: 34.66°N 3.53°W
- Country: Morocco
- Region: Oriental
- Province: Driouch

Area
  - Total: 311.8 km^{2} (120.4 sq mi)

Population (2024)
  - Total: 8,705
  - Density: 27.92/km^{2} (72.3/sq mi)
- Time zone: UTC+0 (GMT)

Ain Zohra (Arabic: عين الزهرة) is a commune in Driouch Province, Oriental, Morocco. At the time of the 2024 census, the commune had a total population of 8705 people.
