= Iferni =

Iferni ⵉⴼⴻⵔⵏⵉ إفرني
- commune
- Location of Iferni in Driouch Province
- Coordinates: 35.00°N 3.66°W
- Country: Morocco
- Region: Oriental
- Province: Driouch

Area
  - Total: 146.9 km^{2} (56.7 sq mi)

Population (2024)
  - Total: 4,873
  - Density: 33.17/km^{2} (85.9/sq mi)
- Time zone: UTC+0 (GMT)

Iferni (Tarifit: ⵉⴼⴻⵔⵏⵉ; Arabic: إفرني) is a commune in Driouch Province of the Oriental administrative region of Morocco. At the time of the 2024 census, the commune had a total population of 4873 people.

== Towns and villages ==
Name	Type	Population (2014)	Area(km^{2})
Iferni	Town	6 365	4 km^{2}
Tlat	Village		
Ait Melloul (Driouch)	Village		
Thimedrarth	Village		
Igardouhan	Village		0,6 km^{2}
Ait Aazziman	Village		
Ibouchrathen	Village		
Imnouhan	Village		
Souf (Driouch)	Village		
Ihammoudan	Hamlet		
