= Annual, Morocco =

Annual
- Interactive map of Annual
- Coordinates: 35°08′N 3°35′W
- Country: Morocco
- Region: Oriental
- Province: Driouch
- Commune: Talilit
- Time zone: UTC+0 (GMT)

Annual or Anoual (Berber language: ⴰⵏⵡⴰⵍ, Anwal) is a small town in northeastern Morocco about 60 km west of Nador, it a part of the Talilit commune, Driouch Province.

During the Rif War or War of Melilla, on July 22, 1921, the Spanish army suffered a grave military defeat against the Rifian Berber army, known as the Battle of Annual.
