= Talilit =

Talilit ⵜⴰⵍⵉⵍⵉⵜ تليليت
- commune
- Location of Talilit in Driouch Province
- Coordinates: 35.15°N 3.55°W
- Country: Morocco
- Region: Oriental
- Province: Driouch

Area
  - Total: 48.52 km^{2} (18.73 sq mi)

Population (2024)
  - Total: 3,881
  - Density: 79.99/km^{2} (207.2/sq mi)
- Time zone: UTC+0 (GMT)

Talilit or Taririt (Tarifit: ⵜⴰⵍⵉⵍⵉⵜ; Arabic: تليليت) is a commune in Driouch Province of the Oriental administrative region of Morocco. At the time of the 2024 census, the commune had a total population of 3881 people

== Etymology ==
The name Talilit most likely came from the Berber word 'Alili' (from Ilili), in Riffian-Berber referred to as Ariri, which is the word for the Nerium Oleander plant.
