= Azlaf =

Azlaf ⴰⵣⵍⴰⴼ ازلاف
- commune
- Location of Azlaf in Driouch Province
- Coordinates: 34.89°N 3.67°W
- Country: Morocco
- Region: Oriental
- Province: Driouch

Area
  - Total: 82.87 km^{2} (32.00 sq mi)

Population (2024)
  - Total: 4,132
  - Density: 49.86/km^{2} (129.1/sq mi)
- Time zone: UTC+0 (GMT)

Azlaf (Tarifit: ⴰⵣⵍⴰⴼ; Arabic: ازلاف) is a commune in Driouch Province of the Oriental administrative region of Morocco. At the time of the 2024 census, the commune had a total population of 4132 people.
