= Dar El Kebdani =

Dar El Kebdani ⴷⴰⵔ ⵍⴽⴻⴱⴷⴰⵏⵉ دار الكبداني
- Town
- Location of Dar El Kebdani in Driouch Province

- Location within Morocco
- Coordinates: 35°07′13″N 3°19′56″W
- Country: Morocco
- Region: Oriental
- Province: Driouch

Area
  - Total: 1.689 sq mi (4.375 km^{2})

Population (2024)
  - Total: 8,518
  - Density: 2,131/sq mi (822.7/km^{2})
- Time zone: UTC+0 (WET)
  - Summer (DST): UTC+1 (WEST)

Dar El Kebdani or Kebdani (Tarifit: ⴷⴰⵔ ⵍⴽⴻⴱⴷⴰⵏⵉ; Arabic: دار الكبداني) is a town in Driouch Province, Oriental, Morocco. According to the 2024 census, it has a population of 8518 people.
