= Ijermaouas =

Coordinates: 35.0700°N 3.6786°W

Ijermaouas ⵉⵊⵔⵎⴰⵡⴰⵙ إجرماواس
- commune
- Location of Ijermaouas in Driouch Province
- Country: Morocco
- Region: Oriental
- Province: Driouch

Area
  - Total: 166.5 km^{2} (64.3 sq mi)

Population (2024)
  - Total: 5.303
  - Density: 31.86/km^{2} (82.5/sq mi)
- Time zone: UTC+0 (GMT)

Ijermaouas (Tarifit: ⵉⵊⵔⵎⴰⵡⴰⵙ; Arabic: إجرماواس) is a commune in Driouch Province, Oriental, Morocco. At the time of the 2024 census, the commune had a total population of 5,303 people.
