= Tafersit =

Tafersit ⵜⴰⴼⵔⵙⵉⵜ تفرسيت
- commune
- Location of Tafersit in Driouch Province

- Location within Morocco
- Coordinates: 35°01′N 3°32′W
- Country: Morocco
- Region: Oriental
- Province: Driouch

Area
  - Total: 28.58 sq mi (74.01 km^{2})

Population (2024)
  - Total: 8,202
  - Density: 287/sq mi (110.8/km^{2})
- Time zone: UTC+0 (WET)
  - Summer (DST): UTC+1 (WEST)

Tafersit (Tarifit: ⵜⴰⴼⵔⵙⵉⵜ; Arabic: تفرسيت) is a commune in Driouch Province, Oriental, Morocco. The town is situated in the Rif mountains, not far from the Mediterranean Sea. According to the 2024 census, it has a population of 8202 people.

== Notable people ==
- Abdelouafi Laftit (born 1967), Minister of Interior of Morocco since 5 April 2017.
- Farid Azarkan (born 1971), Dutch politician who was born in Ighmiren, a department of Tafersit.
