= Kebdana =

Kebdana ⵉⴽⴱⴷⴰⵏⴰⵏ Ikebdanen
- Riffian tribe
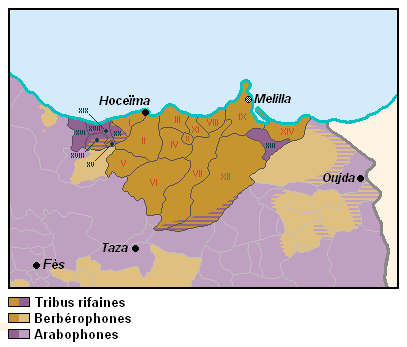
- The Ichebdanen are indicated with XIV
- Interactive map of Kebdana
- Country: Morocco
- Region: Oriental
- Province: Nador
- Time zone: UTC+1 (CET)

The Kebdana or Ichebdanen (Tarifit: ⵉⴽⴱⴷⴰⵏⴰⵏ, romanized: Ikebdanen) are a Riffian-Berber tribe of Zenata origin that lives in the eastern part of the Rif, in northeastern Morocco between Nador and Berkane. They live traditionally in the villages of Kebdana, an area in the Rif region South of Arekmane. Due to migration, many Ichebdanen live now in the cities of the region and in Europe. The main cities of the Ichebdanen are Zaio, Arekmane and Ras Kebdana. In Nador, Berkane and Selouane live many Ichebdanen because of their jobs. In the Rif region are Ichebdanen famous for their use of the consonant „l“ in many words. For example: Timelalin (eggs)

== History ==
One of the earliest historical references to the Ichebdanen is found in the work of al-Hasan ibn Muhammad al-Wazzan. According to his account, the territory of the Ichebdanen extended from the Moulouya River in the east to approximately Melilla in the west.

According to El Bakri they were the eastern most tribe of the Emirate of Nekor.
