= Kassita =

Kassita Kasita كاسيطا
- municipality
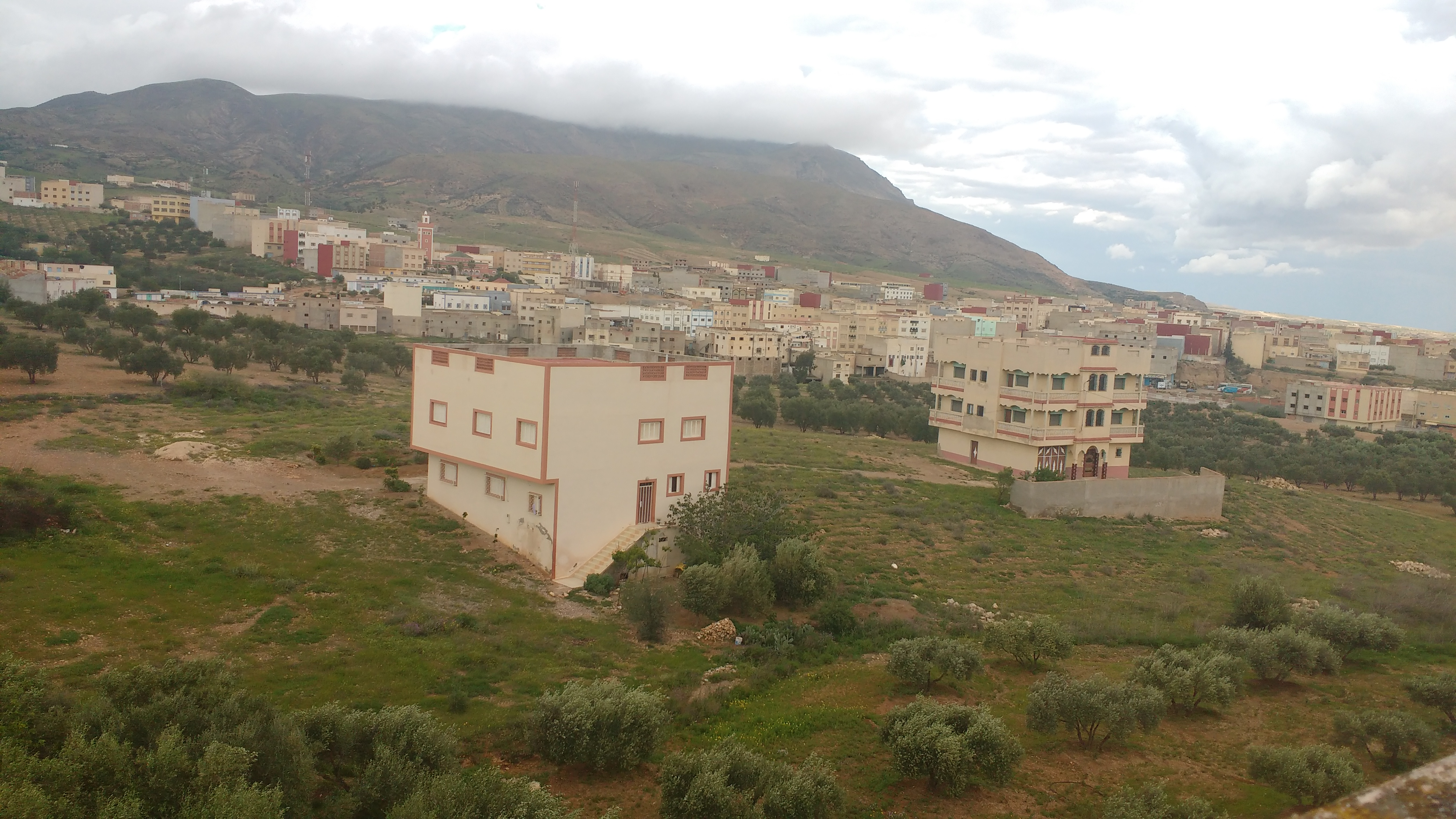

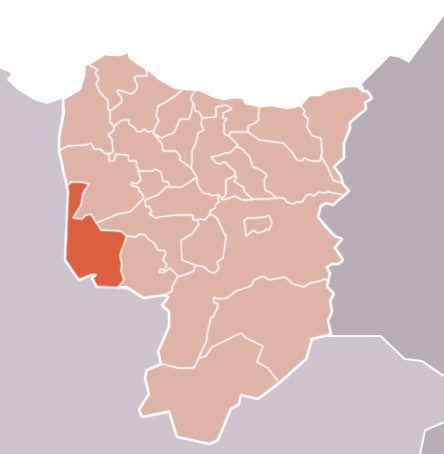
- Location of kassita in Driouch Province
- Coordinates: 34.890°N 3.728°W
- Country: Morocco
- Region: Oriental
- Province: Driouch Province

Population (2014)
  - Total: 2,675
- Time zone: UTC+0 (GMT)

Kassita (Tarifit: Kasita, ⴽⴰⵙⵉⵜⴰ; Arabic: كاسيطا) is a small town in the Driouch Province in northeastern Morocco, in the Oriental administrative region. According to the 2014 census, it has a population of 2,675.
