= Amejjaou =

Coordinates: 35°10′25.93″N 3°15′2.71″W

Amejjaou ⴰⵎⴻⵊⵊⴰⵡ ا مجو
- commune
- Location of Amejjaou in Driouch Province
- Country: Morocco
- Region: Oriental
- Province: Driouch

Population (2004)
  - Total: 5,977
- Time zone: UTC+0 (GMT)

Amejjaou (Amazigh: Amejjaw, ⴰⵎⴻⵊⵊⴰⵡ, Arabic: ا مجو) is a commune in Driouch Province, Oriental, Morocco. At the time of the 2004 census, the commune had a total population of 5977 people living in 1038 households.
