= Gzenaya =

Coordinates: 34°44′N 3°57′W

Igzennayen ⵉⴳⵣⴻⵏⵏⴰⵢⴻⵏ
- Tribe
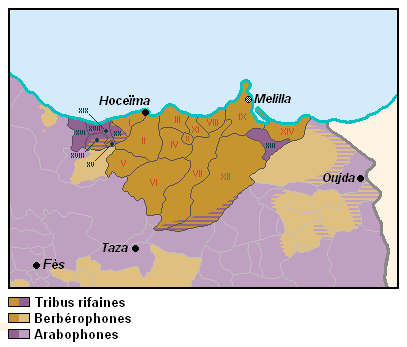
- The Igzennayen are indicated with VI
- Interactive map of Igzennayen
- Country: Morocco
- Region: Oriental
- Province: Taza, Driouch
- Time zone: UTC+1 (CET)

Gzenaya or Igzennayen (Tarifit: ⵉⴳⵣⴻⵏⵏⴰⵢⴻⵏ, romanized: Igzennayen) is the name of a Riffian tribe of the Rif region in the north-eastern part of Morocco. Towns such as Aknoul, Ajdir Gzenaya and Ain Hamra belong to this tribe. Many Igzennayen can also be found in cities such as Tangier, Taza and Meknes.

== Etymology ==
The word Gzenaya is the Arabic version of the Berber name "Igzennayen". It is believed their name comes from izinnayen (lit. 'libertines, fornicators'). Like other Riffian groups, they are believed to descend from Goliath so their neighbours, the Ait Waryaghar, jokingly refer to them as r- 'adhawth n-Sidna Dawud (lit. 'the enemy of our lord David').

== History ==
Gzenaya has an important place in the history of Morocco. It is the birthplace of many heroes; as well as being the birth tribe of Jaich ittahrir, the army of independence.

=== War with France ===
During the protectorate era, the Gzenaya tribe defeated France in the “Triangle of Death”, a nickname given to the area between Aknoul, Boured and Tizi Ouasli, in October 1955, for the country's independence and the end of the protectorate.

== Geography ==
Geographically, the Igzennayen historical region extends over the modern Moroccan provinces of Taza, Al-Hoceima, Taounate, and possibly a portion of the Driouch province.

The geography is characterized by its high mountains, some small fertile plains, and by a fresh Mediterranean climate.

The tribal area of the Igzennayen hosts the iron rich water source Tala Tazeggʷaġt, of which the water is known for its healing properties.

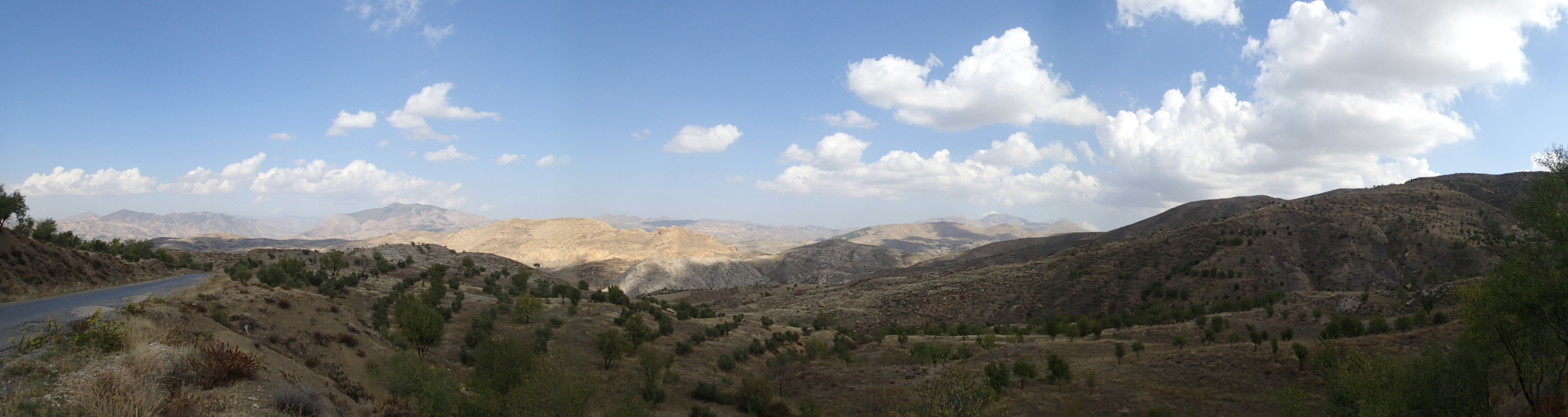
Panorama on the Igzennayen mountain range

Some notable towns and villages, tribes of the Gzeneya include:

- Ait Aissam izem=Ait Eas'im
- Braret
- Buisri
- Burd
- Buankud
- Branda
- Dcar Azrou
- Taghirast
- Duaya
- Aarkub
- Ibakriyen
- Inehecen
- Ixewanen
- Ighbaben
- Iharkliyen
- Iharcliene
- Iharesen
- Ihdayen (Hadria)
- Ihrucen
- Ikabunen
- Ikarwan
- Inehnahen
- Ibuakbathen (sidi ali bourkba)
- Izarwalen
- Jbarna
- Tamjount
- Tastit
- Tarmest
- Tbadiwien
- Tegzratin
- Tizi w-Asri
- Tizi n Dra
- Tizi Ouasli
- Asht Aissa
- Yarwahdud
- Douar Ifzarene (Ifzan)
- Douar tighza
