= Ajdir =

Ajdir ⴰⵊⴷⵉⵔ أجدير
- Town
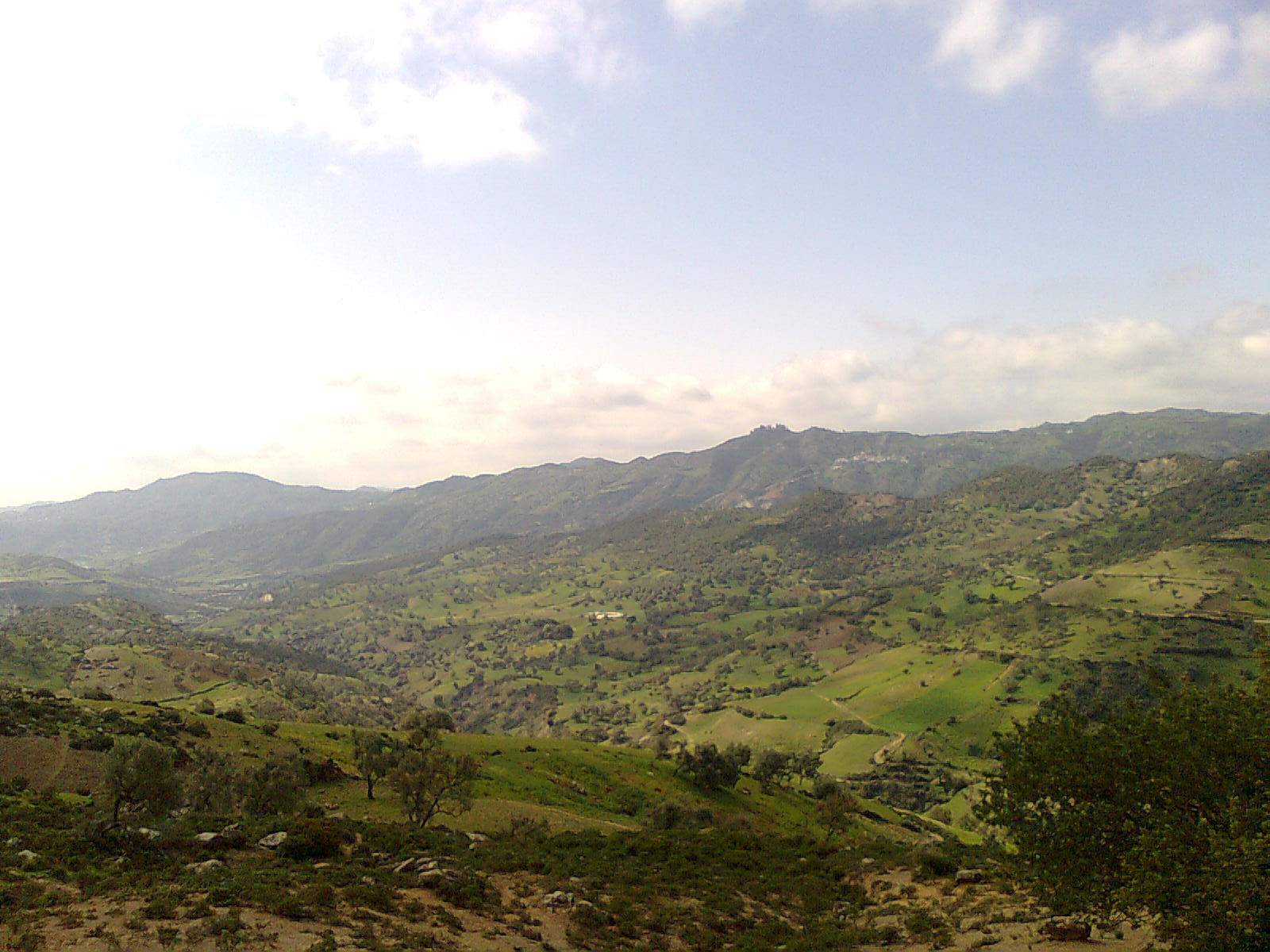
- Interactive map of Ajdir
- Coordinates: 35.200°N 3.917°W
- Country: Morocco
- Region: Tanger-Tetouan-Al Hoceima
- Province: Al Hoceïma Province

Population (2014)
  - Total: 5,314
- Time zone: UTC+0 (GMT)

Ajdir (Arabic: أجدير, romanized: ajdīr; Standard Moroccan Tamazight: ⴰⵊⴷⵉⵔ, romanized: ajdir) is a small town in Morocco near Al Hoceima. It was the capital of the Republic of the Rif from 1922-1926 under the leadership of Abd el-Krim (d.1963). The town lies in the territory of the Ait Waryagher tribe.

== See also ==
- Aith Ouriaghel
