= Temsamane (tribe) =

Riffian tribe of northeastern Morocco

Coordinates: 35°07′20.26″N 3°38′14.40″W

Ait Temsamane Ayeṯ Ṯemsaman أيث ثمسامان
- Tribe
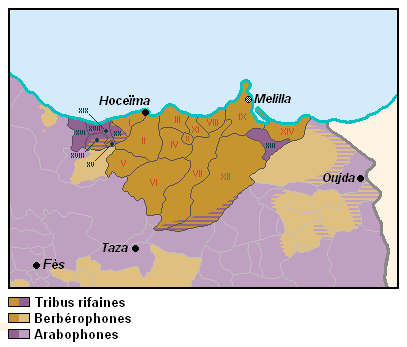
- The Ait Temsamane are indicated with III
- Interactive map of Ait Temsamane
- Country: Morocco
- Region: Oriental
- Province: Driouch
- Time zone: UTC+0 (GMT)

The Ait Temsamane (Amazigh language: Ayeṯ Ṯemsaman, أيث ثمسامان) are a Berber tribe in northeastern Morocco. The main town in their area is Temsamane, with other significant villages including Kerouna and Boudinar.

== History ==
In this region, the Spanish general Silvestre was defeated by the Berber resistance under Abd el-Krim's command. It was also the first seat of the Kingdom of Nekor.
