= Kerouna =

Kerouna كرونا
- Town
- Interactive map of Kerouna
- Coordinates: 35°07′03″N 3°38′36″W
- Country: Morocco
- Region: Oriental
- Province: Nador Province

Population (2004)
  - Total: 2,188
- Time zone: UTC+0 (GMT)

Kerouna is a town in Driouch Province of the Oriental administrative region of Morocco. According to the 2004 census, it has a population of 2,188.
