= Driouch =

Driouch ⴷⵔⵉⵡⵛ (Standard Moroccan Tamazight) الدريوش (Arabic)
- Town
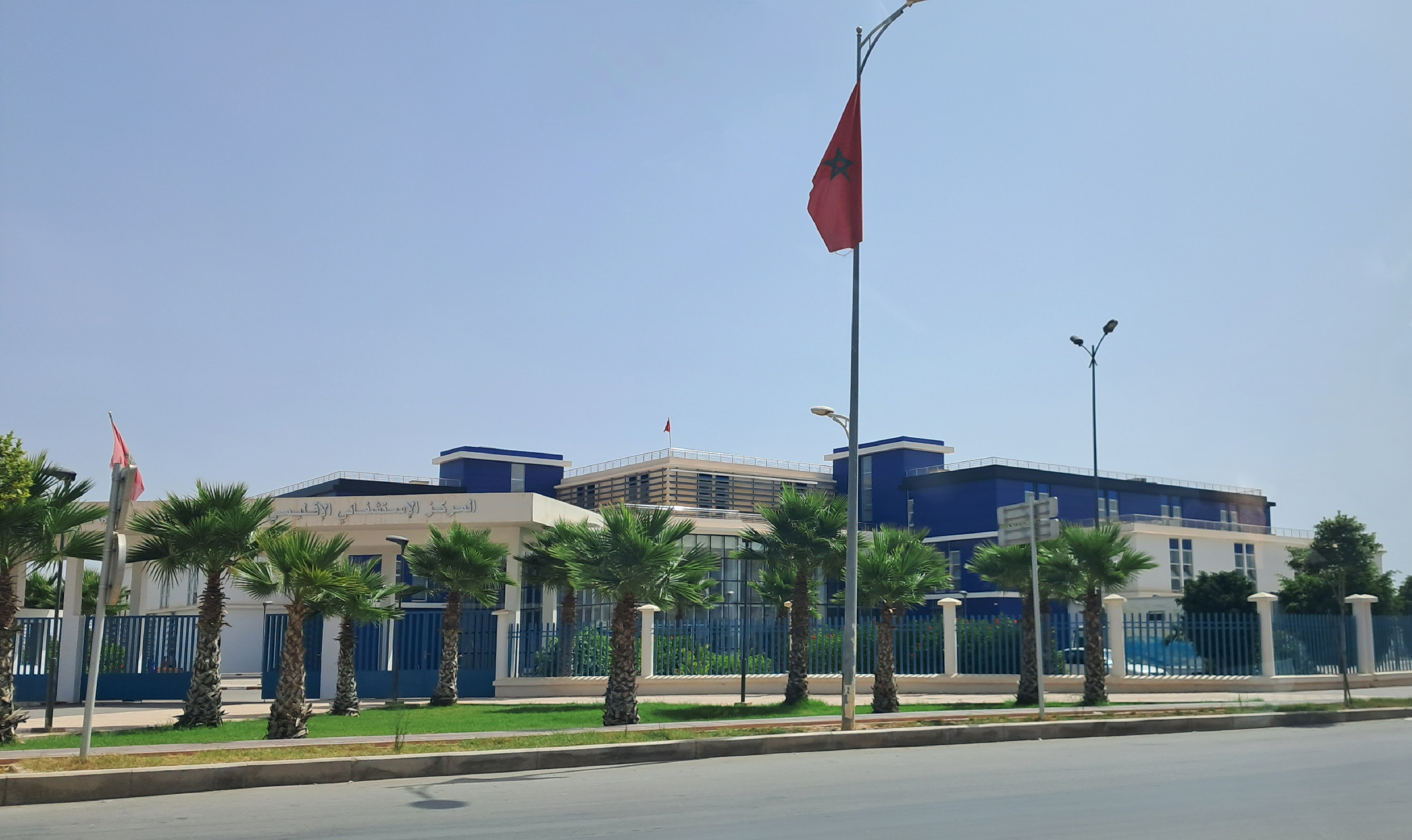
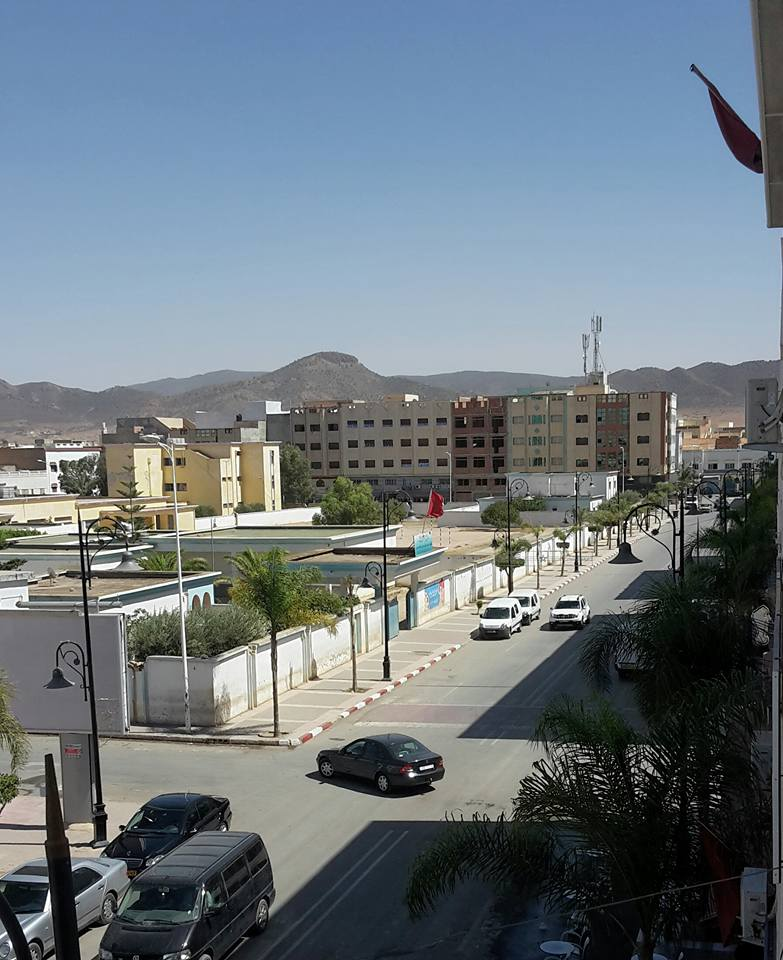
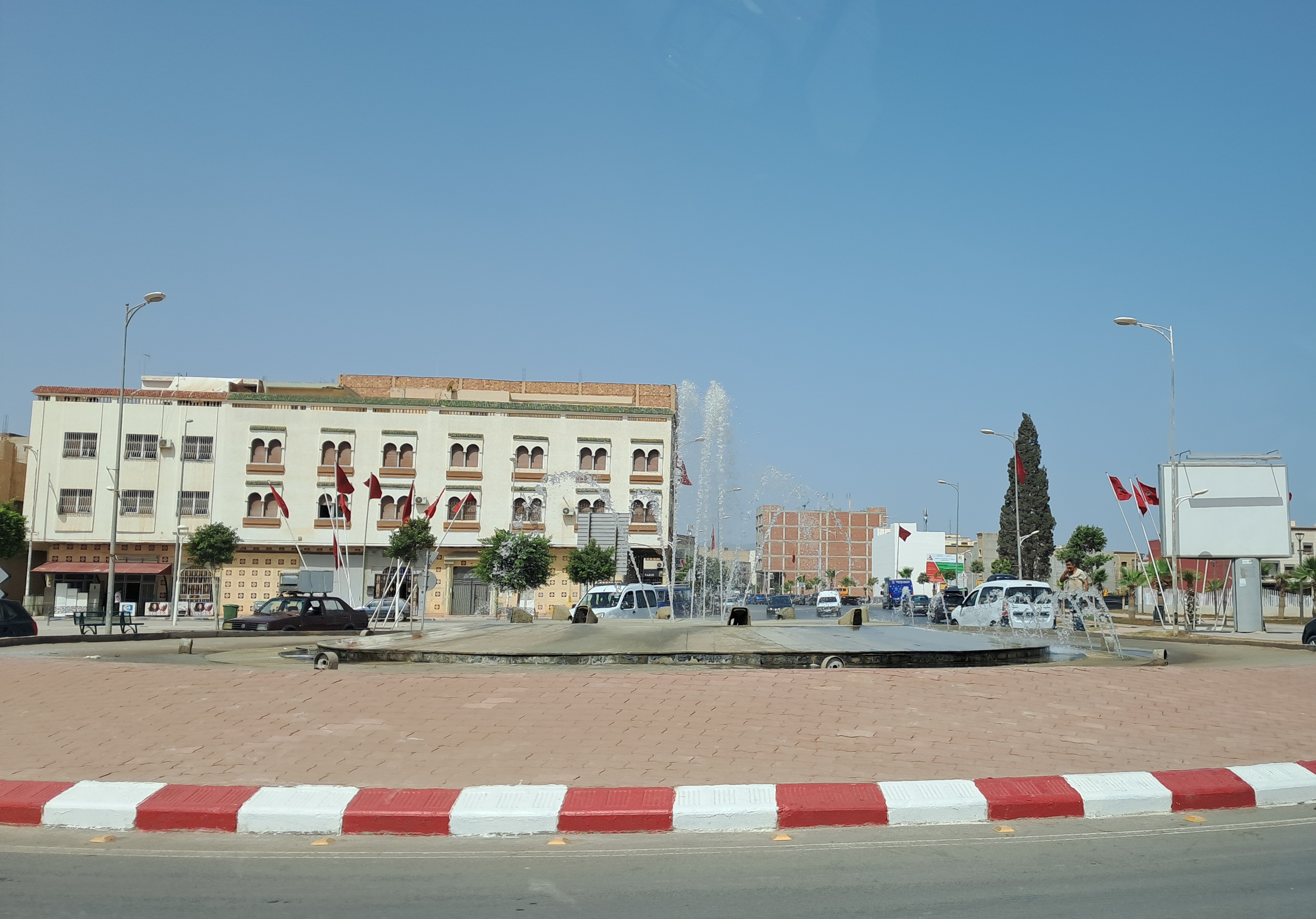
- Clockwise from top: the Driouch Provincial Hospital, the streets of Driouch and the Hassan II Avenue roundabout.

- Location of Driouch in Driouch Province
- Coordinates: 34°59′N 3°23′W
- Country: Morocco
- Region: Oriental
- Province: Driouch Province

Area
  - Total: 2,339 sq mi (6,057 km^{2})

Population (2024)
  - Total: 15.661
  - Density: 6,700/sq mi (2,586/km^{2})
- Time zone: UTC+0 (GMT)

Driouch (Note: Standard Moroccan Tamazight: ⴷⵔⵉⵡⴻⵛ Arabic: الدريوش) is a town in Morocco and the capital of Driouch Province. In 2024, the town had a population of 15,661.
