= Midar =

Coordinates: 34°57′N 3°32′W

Midar ⵎⵉⴹⴰⵔ ميضار
- municipality
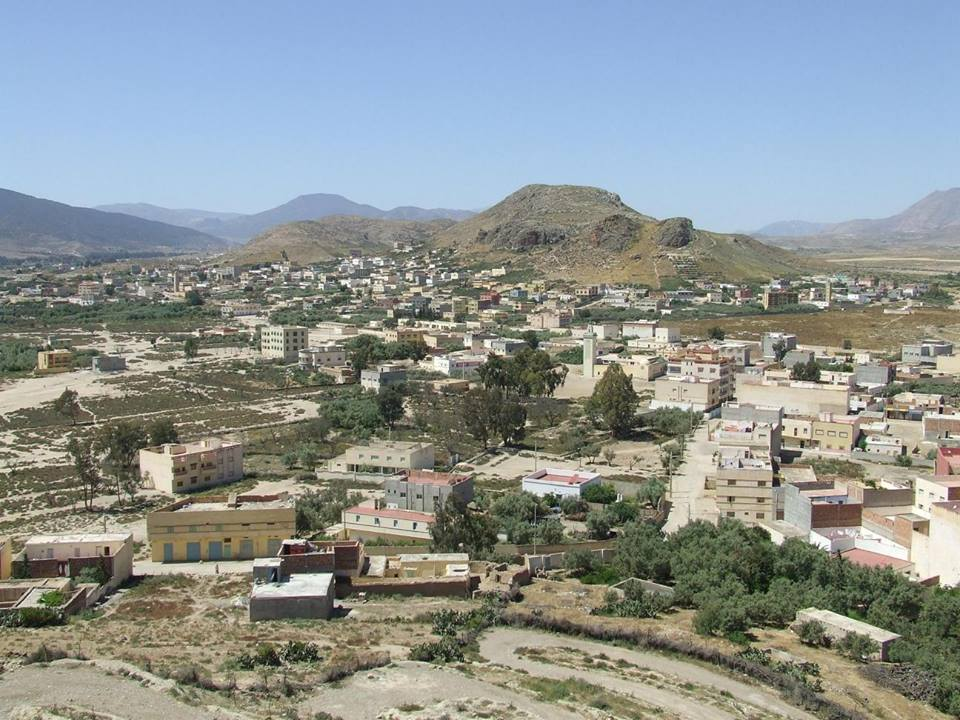
- Skyline of Midar

- Location of Midar in Driouch Province
- Country: Morocco
- Region: Oriental
- Province: Driouch Province

Area
  - Total: 25.60 sq mi (66.30 km^{2})

Population (2024)
  - Total: 15.391
- Time zone: UTC+0 (GMT)

Midar (Arabic: ميضار) is a municipality in Driouch Province, Oriental, Morocco. According to the 2024 census, it has a population of 15.391.
