= Ben Taieb =

Ben Taieb ابن الطيب
- Town
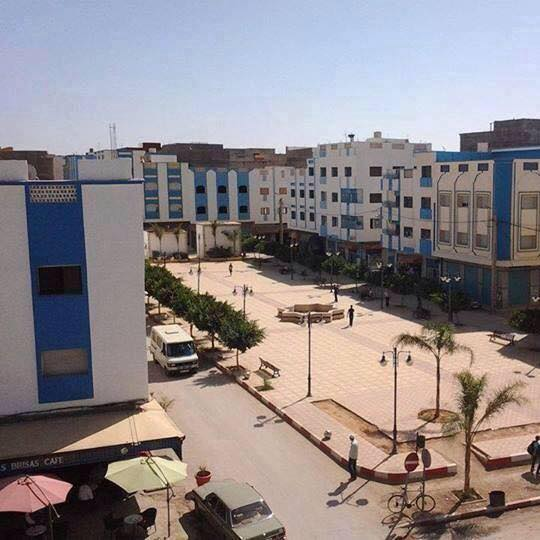
- Downtown Ben Taieb

- Location of Ben Taieb in Driouch Province
- Coordinates: 35.083706°N 3.469555°W
- Country: Morocco
- Region: Oriental
- Province: Driouch

Area
  - Total: 12.75 km^{2} (4.92 sq mi)

Population (2024)
  - Total: 15,002
  - Density: 1,177/km^{2} (3,050/sq mi)
- Time zone: UTC+0 (GMT)

Ben Taieb (ابن الطيب) is a town in Driouch Province, part of the Oriental region of Morocco. The town covers an area of approximately 12.75 km² and, as of 2024, has a population of 15,002, resulting in a population density of 1,177 inhabitants per km².
