= Temsamane =

Coordinates: 35°07′N 3°38′W

Temsamane Ṯemsaman ثمسامان
- commune
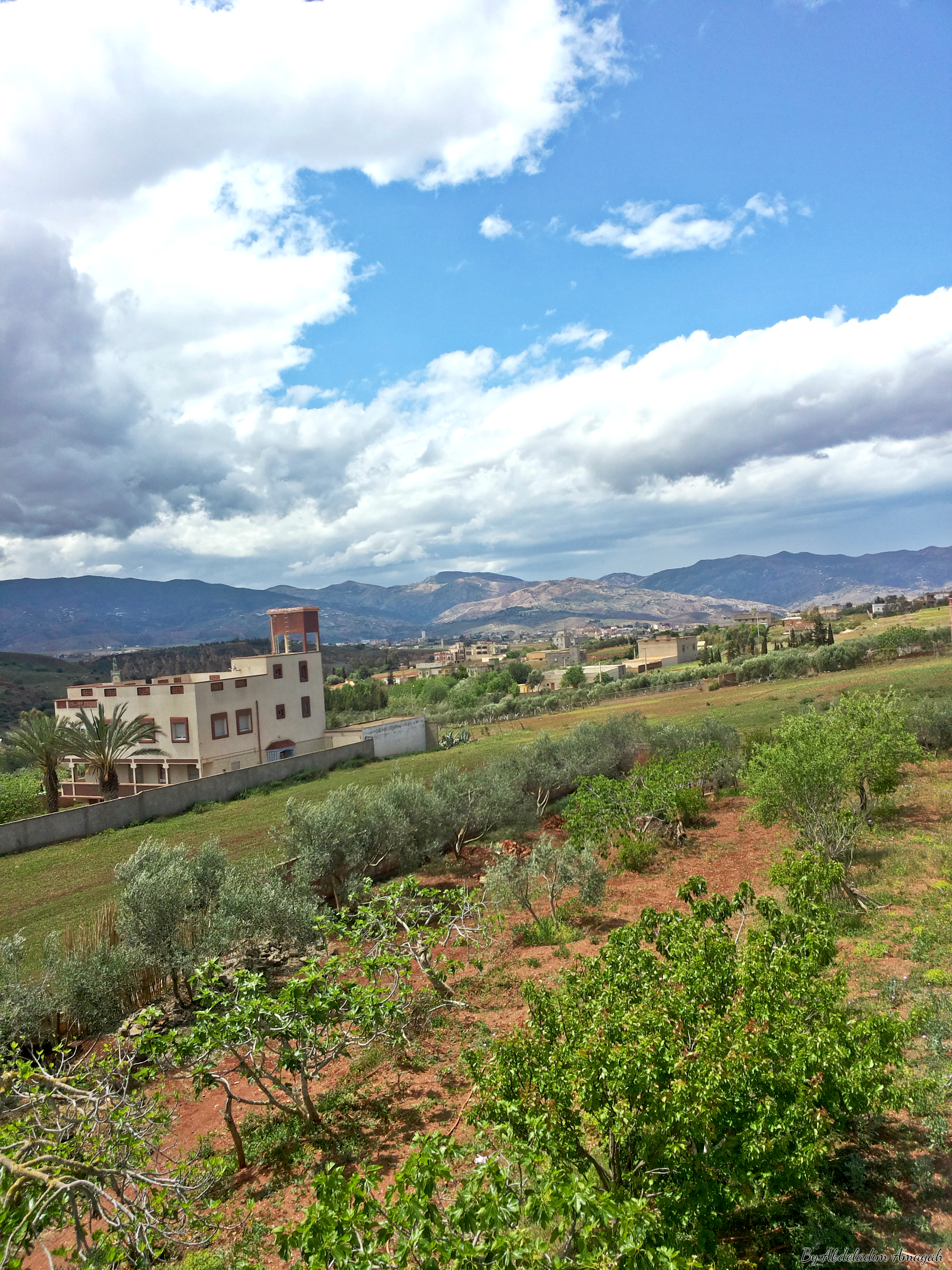

- Location of Temsamane in Driouch Province
- Country: Morocco
- Region: Oriental
- Province: Driouch

Population (2004)
  - Total: 14,937
- Time zone: UTC+0 (GMT)

Temsamane (Amazigh language: Ṯemsaman ثمسامان) is a town and commune in Driouch Province of the Oriental administrative region of Morocco. At the time of the 2024 census, the commune had a total population of 12,198 people.

== See also ==
Temsamane (Tribe)
