= Driouch Province =

Province in northeastern Morocco, formed in 2009

Coordinates: 34.9833°N 3.3833°W

Driouch Province إقليم الدريوش ⵜⴰⵙⴳⴰ ⵏ ⴷⴷⵔⵉⵡⵛ
- Province
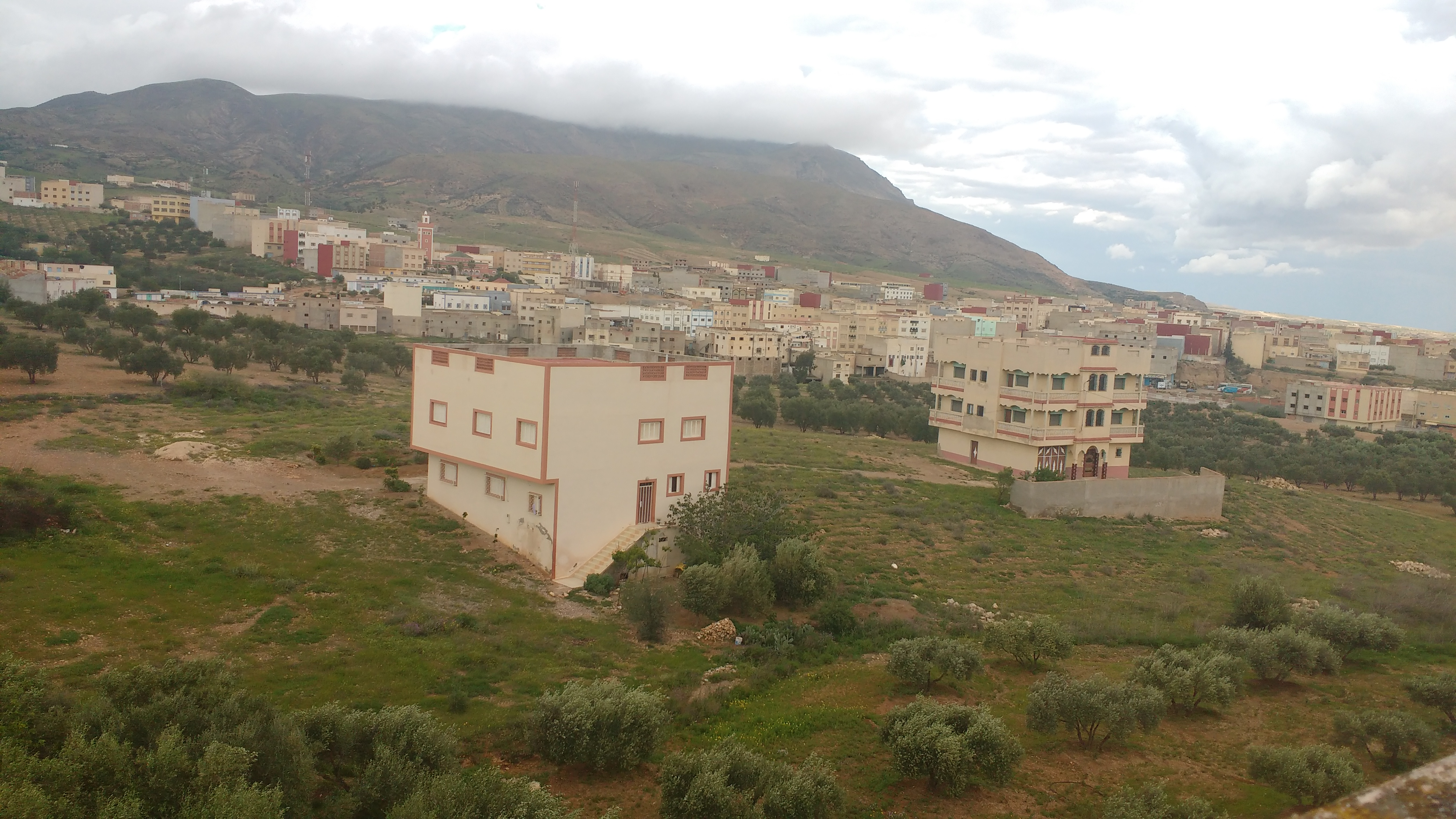
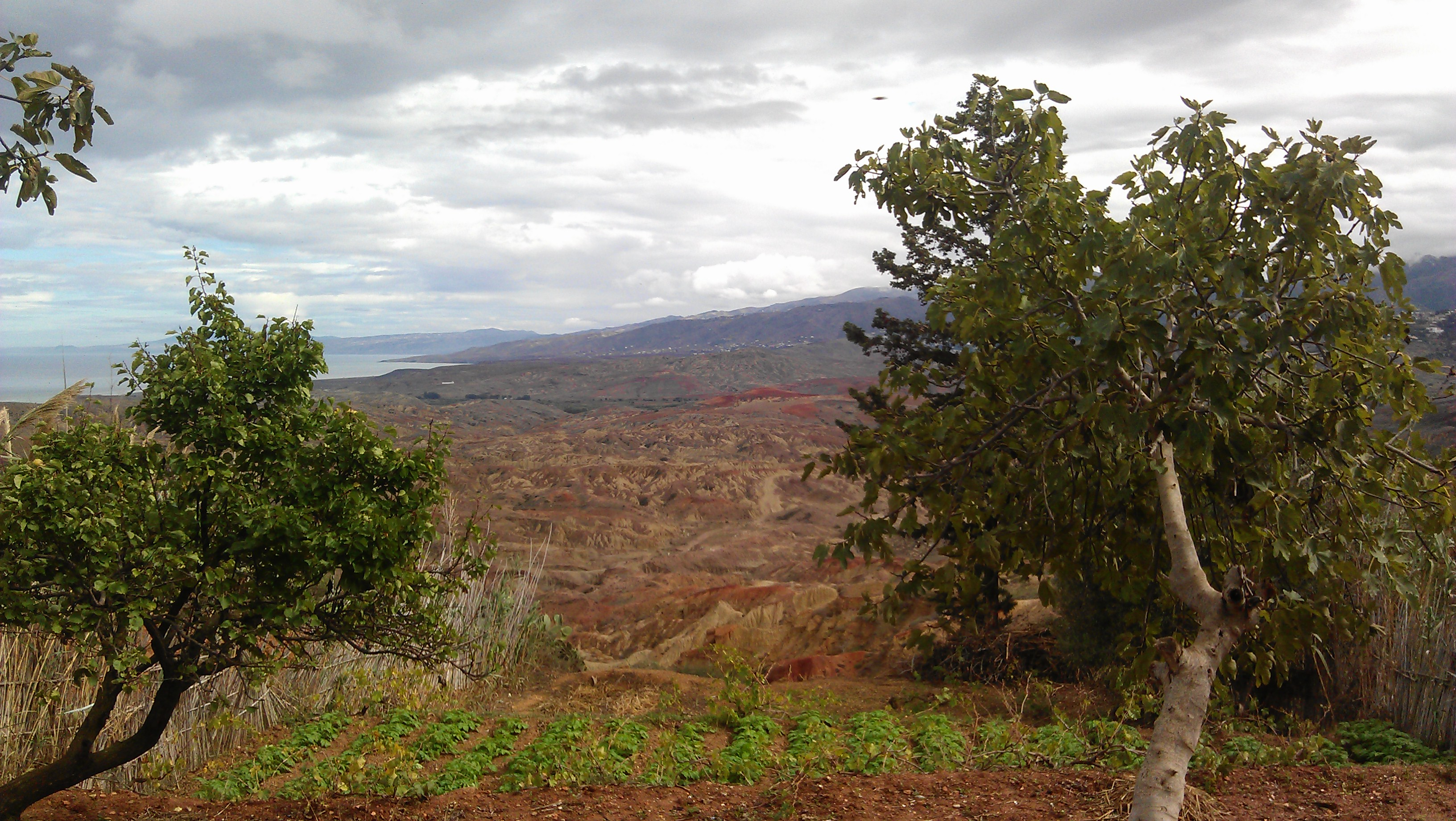

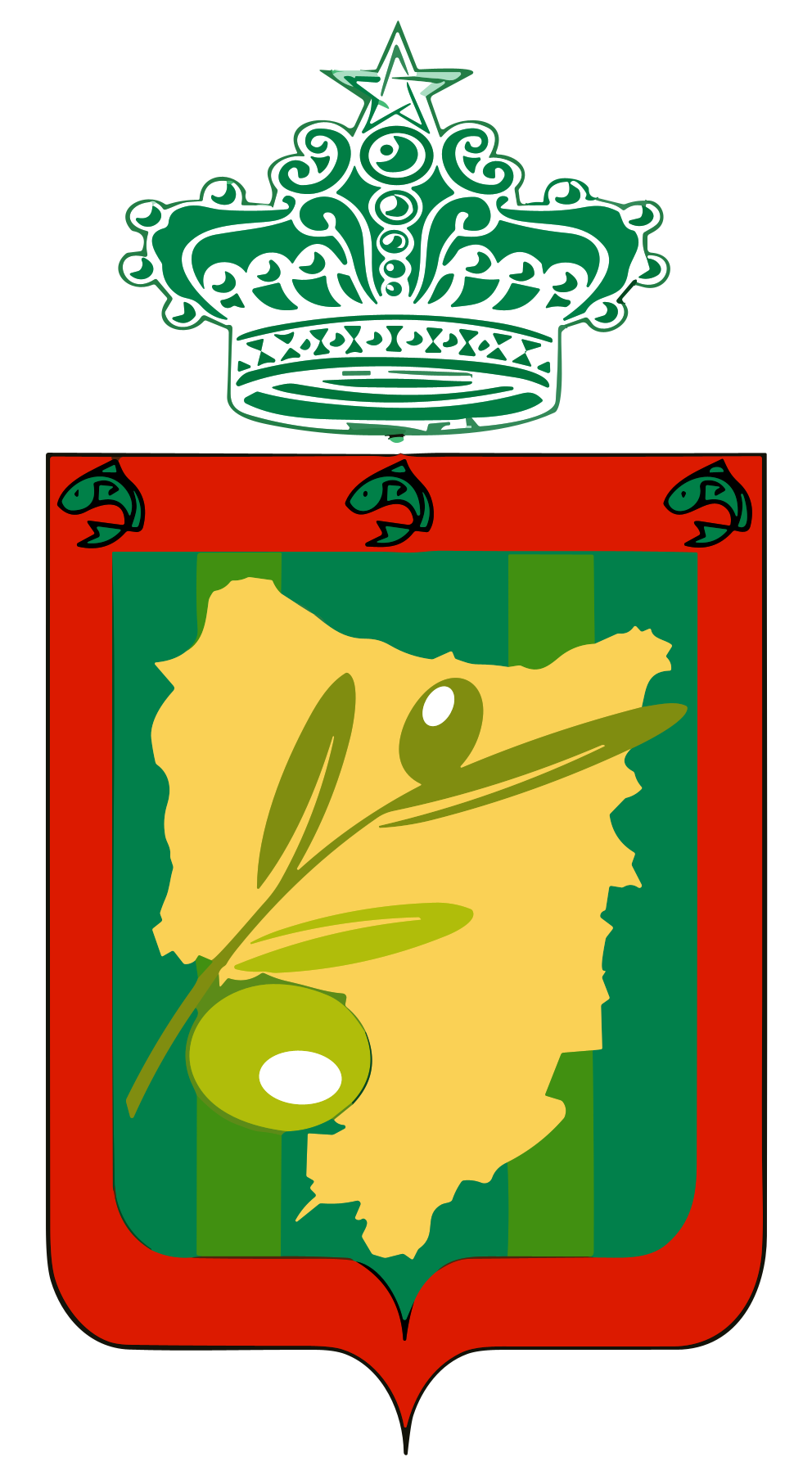
- Seal
- Interactive map of Driouch Province
- Country: Morocco
- Region: Oriental
- Capital: Driouch

Area
  - Total: 2,869 km^{2} (1,108 sq mi)

Population (2024)
  - Total: 188,191
  - Density: 65.69/km^{2} (170.1/sq mi)

Driouch Province (Arabic: إقليم الدريوش; Standard Moroccan Tamazight: ⵜⴰⵙⴳⴰ ⵏ ⴷⴷⵔⵉⵡⵛ) is a province in the Oriental region of northeastern Morocco. It was established in 2009 by the division of the former Nador Province. Its capital is Driouch.

According to the 2024 national census, the province has a population of 188,191 inhabitants.

The province borders Nador Province to the north, Al Hoceima Province to the west, Guercif Province to the southwest, and Taza Province to the south.

== Geography ==
Driouch Province is located in the eastern Rif area of Morocco. Its territory includes both mountainous zones and inland plains. The region is characterized by a Mediterranean climate with continental influences, with hot summers and relatively cool winters.

== Demographics ==
The population of the province has declined in recent decades. It decreased from 222,987 inhabitants in 2004 to 188,191 in 2024.

Between 2014 and 2024, the population decreased by approximately 22,868 inhabitants (−10.8%), with a more pronounced decline in rural areas than in urban areas.

== Administrative divisions ==
Communes of Driouch Province

According to the administrative division established in 2009, the province is composed of 23 municipalities, including 3 urban municipalities (Driouch, Ben Taïeb and Midar) and 20 rural communes distributed across several caïdats and circles.

Five localities are classified as cities: the municipalities of Driouch, Ben Taïeb and Midar, as well as the urban centres of Tafersit and Dar El Kebdani.

The province is divided administratively into the following:

Name	Geographic code	Type	Population (2024)	Notes
Driouch	02.167.01.09	Municipality	15,661	
Midar	02.167.01.13	Municipality	15,391	
Ben Taieb	02.167.01.03	Municipality	15,002	
Bni Marghnine	02.167.11.05	Rural commune	4,950	
Boudinar	02.167.11.07	Rural commune	7,996	
Ijermaouas	02.167.11.11	Rural commune	5,303	
Oulad Amghar	02.167.11.19	Rural commune	5,755	
Temsamane	02.167.11.25	Rural commune	12,198	2,858 residents live in the center, called Kerouna; 9,340 residents live in rural areas.
Trougout	02.167.11.27	Rural commune	11,348	
Azlaf	02.167.13.01	Rural commune	4,132	
Iferni	02.167.13.09	Rural commune	4,873	
M'Hajer	02.167.13.15	Rural commune	8,008	
Ouardana	02.167.13.17	Rural commune	7,032	
Tafersit	02.167.13.21	Rural commune	8,202	2,964 residents live in the center, called Tafersit; 5,238 residents live in rural areas.
Talilit	02.167.13.23	Rural commune	3,881	
Tsaft	02.167.13.29	Rural commune	8,401	2,876 residents live in the center, called Kassita; 5,525 residents live in rural areas.
Ait Mait	02.167.15.03	Rural commune	4,721	
Amejjaou	02.167.15.05	Rural commune	4,177	
Dar El Kebdani	02.167.15.07	Rural commune	8,518	3,595 residents live in the center, called Dar El Kebdani; 4,923 residents live in rural areas.
Tazaghine	02.167.15.13	Rural commune	3,456	
Ain Zohra	02.167.17.01	Rural commune	8,705	
Mtalssa	02.167.17.09	Rural commune	16,778	
Oulad Boubker	02.167.17.11	Rural commune	3,703	
