= Tarifit =

Zenati Berber language of northern Morocco

- Riffian, Tarifiyt
- Tmaziɣt; Tarifit/Tarifect
- Native to: Morocco, Spain (Melilla)
- Region: Rif
- Ethnicity: Riffians
- Native speakers: 1.2 million (2024)
- Language family: Afro-Asiatic: Berber; Northern; Zenati; Tarifit
- Writing system: Latin, Tifinagh, Arabic

Language codes
- ISO 639-3: rif
- Glottolog: tari1263
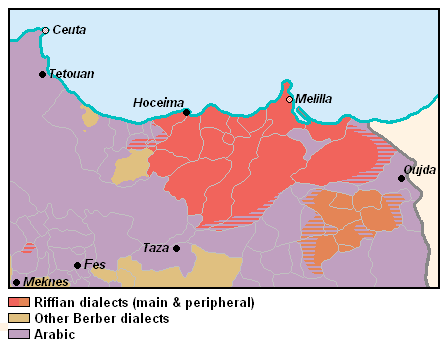

Tarifit (also known as Riffian; endonym: Tmaziɣt or Tarifit/Tarifect) (Note: Pronunciations: Tmaziɣt [θmæzɪˑχt] ~ [θmɛzɪˑχt] or [θmæzɪˑʁθ] ~ [θmɛzɪˑʁθ]; Tarifit [θæɾɪfɪˑθ] ~ [θɛɾɪfɪˑθ] or [θaɾɪfɪˑθ]; Tarifect [θaɾɪfəʃt]) is a Zenati Berber language from the Afroasiatic language family spoken in the Rif region in northern Morocco. It is spoken natively by some 1,200,000 Riffians, comprising 3.2% of the population of Morocco, primarily in the Rif provinces of Nador, Al Hoceima, Driouch, and Berkane. It is also the second most spoken language in Melilla, an autonomous Spanish city, after Spanish.

== Name ==
The traditional autonym of the language is Tmaziɣt (Tamazight), a term that is widely used, albeit in different forms, among Berber speaking groups all over northern Africa. Tarifit/Tarifect, as a linguistic term, is a new coinage, developed when it became more relevant to distinguish it from other Berber varieties.

== Classification ==
Young man speaking Riffian Berber, recorded in Cuba.

Tarifit is a Zenati Berber language, consisting of various sub-dialects specific to each clan. It is spoken primarily in the Rif, a mountainous region of northern Morocco.

== Geographic distribution ==
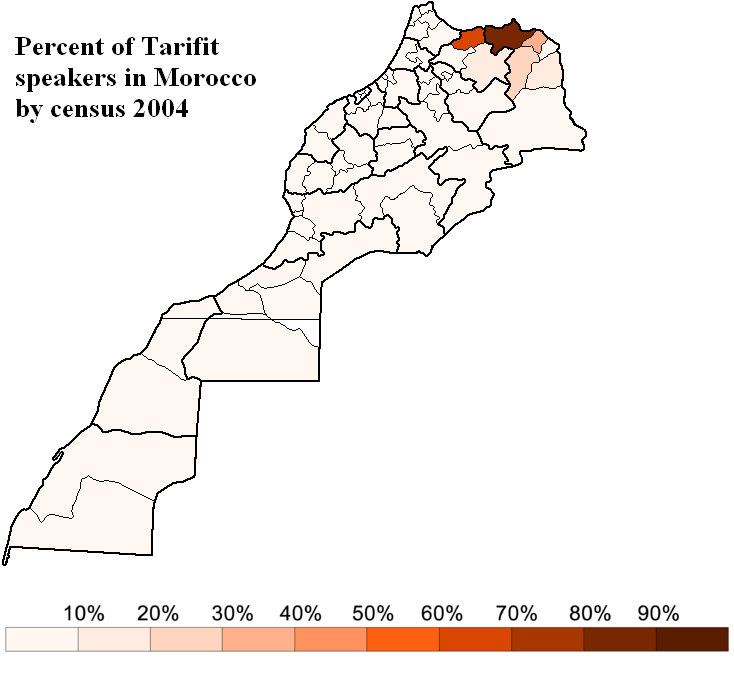
Percent of Rif-Berber speakers in Morocco by census 2004 Based on data found Here

Tarifit is spoken primarily in the Rif region of northern Morocco, including the Mediterranean coast and the Rif mountains, as well as in the Spanish enclave of Melilla, which has a large Tarifit-speaking minority. Smaller Tarifit-speaking communities are found in other Moroccan cities, in neighboring Algeria, and in Europe, notably the Netherlands and Belgium.

=== Morocco ===
Tarifit has significant dialectal variation, as shown in the dialect atlas by Lafkioui (1997). The majority of Tarifit varieties are spoken in northern Morocco, including those of Al Hoceima, Temsamane, Nador, Ikebdanen, and the more southern variety in Taza province. Two smaller Berber languages are spoken in North Morocco: the Sanhaja de Srair and the Ghomara languages. They are only distantly related to Tarifit and are not mutually intelligible with it.

=== Spain ===
Tarifit is spoken in the Spanish autonomous city of Melilla, which is also located within the Rif region. It is protected in Spain under the European Charter for Regional or Minority Languages, although it has been subjected to calls for the government to accord it further protection as a recognized regional language.

=== Algeria ===
Linguistic map of western Algeria showing Berber-speaking areas

A few Tarifit dialects are spoken, or used to be spoken, in western Algeria, particularly in settlements established by Riffian emigrants from the 19th century onward, such as Bethioua.

== Dialects ==
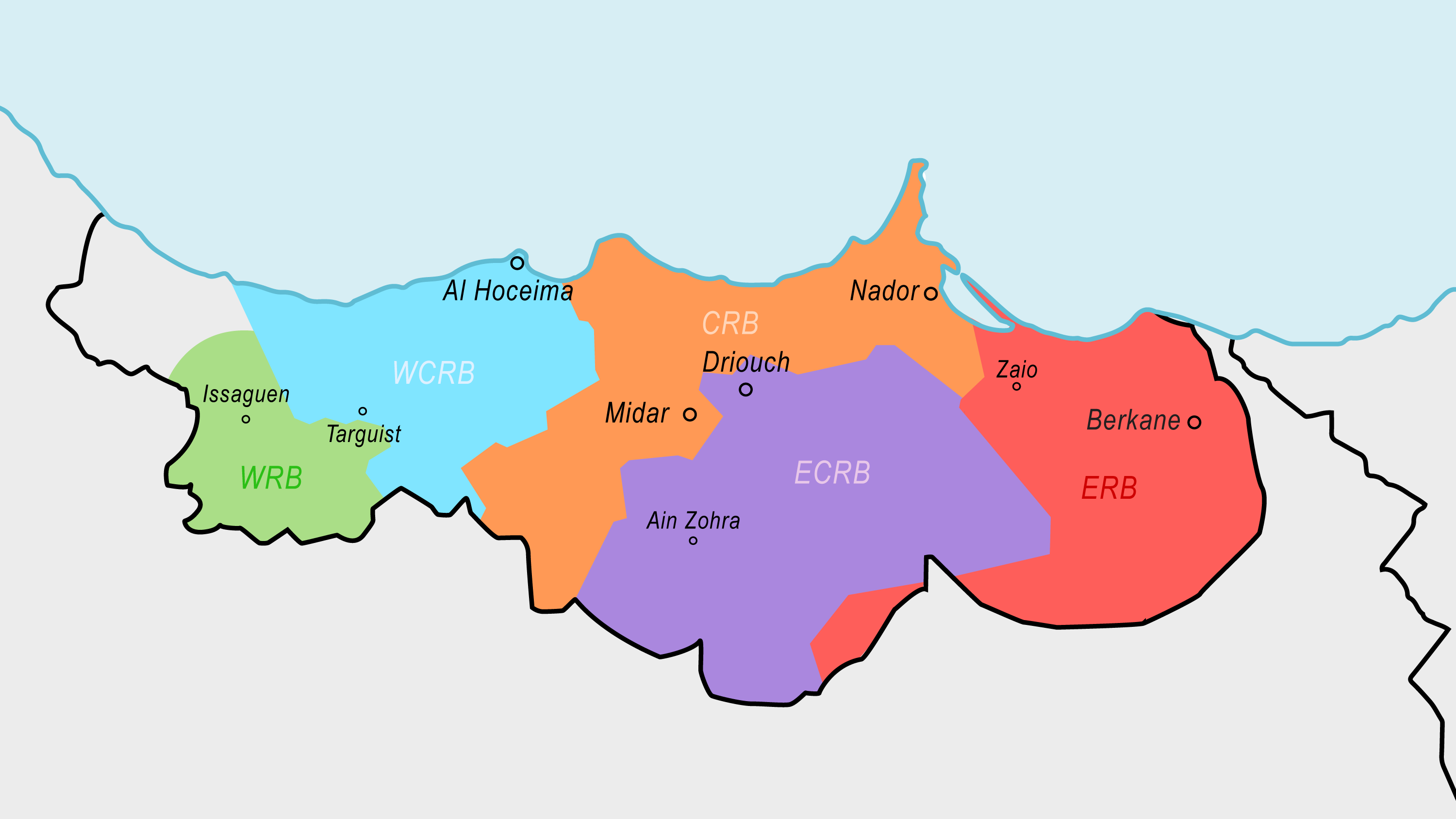
Riffian dialectal groups according to Mena B. Lafkioui

There is no consensus on what varieties are considered Tarifit. Disagreement mainly concerns the easternmost dialects of the Iznasen and the westernmost dialects of Senhaja de Sraïr. Iznasen is counted as a dialect in Kossman (1999), but Blench (2006) classifies it as one of the closely related Mzab–Wargla languages.

Lafkioui (2020) argues that the Berber varieties of the Rif area – including the varieties of the Senhaja and of the Iznasen – form a language continuum with five stable core aggregates:

- Western Rif Berber: cities such as Ketama and Taghzout.
- West-Central Rif Berber: cities such as Al Hoceima, Targuist, Imzouren.
- Central Rif Berber: cities such as Nador, Midar and Kassita.
- East-Central Rif Berber: cities such as Al Aaroui, Driouch and Ain Zohra.
- Eastern Rif Berber: cities such as Berkane and Ras Kebdana.

According to Lafkioui, these groupings cut across the traditionally used groupings (Senhaja, Rif, Iznasen), which she argues hold no classification value and do not reflect the actual complexity of the Rif area's sociolinguistic landscape.

Lexical differences
	Western (Senhaja)	West-Central	Central	East-Central	Eastern
Cat	amcic	amcic	mucc	miccew	mucc
Chick	asiwsiw, afullus	afiǧus, fiǧus	fiǧus	iceḵʷcew, icewcew	iceḵʷcew, icewcew
Ram	abeɛɛac	abeɛɛac, iḵerri, iḵaari	icaari, acaari, acraa	iḵaari, aḵraa	iḵerri
Land	tamazirt	tamurt, tamuat	tammuat	tammuat, tamuat	tammurt
Woman	tameṭut, tamɣart	tamɣart, tamɣaat	tamɣaat, tameṭṭut, tameṭut	tamɣaat, tameṭut	tamɣart, tameṭṭut, tameṭut

== Phonology ==
=== Vowels ===
	Front	Central	Back
High	i		u
Mid		(ə)	
Low		a	

- A mid-central vowel /ə/ can occur in lax positions.
- Lax allophones of /i, a, u/ are heard as [ɪ, æ, ʊ].
- In the vicinity of pharyngealized consonants, /i, a, u/ are heard as [ɪˤ, ɑˤ, ʊˤ].
- Vowels lengthen in closed final syllables, e.g. tisit [θɪsɪˑθ] 'mirror'.

==== Vocalized r ====
Vocalization		Example		
Phonemically	Phonetically	IPA	Originally	Translation
/iɾ/	[ɛa]	[sːɛað]	ssird	to wash
/uɾ/	[ɔa]	[ʊjɔa]	uyur	to walk
/aɾ/	[a ~ æ]	[zəmːa ~ æ]	zemmar	to be able to
/iɾˤ/	[ɪˤɑ]	[ɪˤɑðˤ]	iṛḍ	to dress
/uɾˤ/	[ʊˤa]	[ʃːʊˤa]	ccuṛ	to fill
/aɾˤ/	[ɑˤ]	[θɑˤmɣɑˤθ]	tamɣaṛt	woman

=== Consonants ===
All consonants except for /ŋ/, /tʃ/ and /ʔ/ have a geminate counterpart. Most of the time, a geminate is only different from its plain counterpart because of its length. Spirantized consonants have long stops as their geminate counterparts, e.g. yezḏeɣ [jəzðəʁ] 'he lives' vs. izeddeɣ [ɪzədːəʁ] 'he always lives'. There are only a few phonotactic exceptions to this, e.g. in verb suffixes before vowel-initial clitics, ṯessfehmeḏḏ-as [θəsːfəɦməðːæs]. A few consonants have divergent geminated counterparts; ḍ (/dˤ/ and /ðˤ/) to ṭṭ (/tˤː/), w (/w/) to kkʷ (/kːʷ/), ɣ (/ʁ/) to qq (/qː/), and ř (/r/) to ǧ (/dʒː/). There are some exceptions to this. This is most common with ww, e.g. acewwaf [æʃəwːæf] 'hair', and rarely occurs with ɣɣ and ḍḍ e.g. iɣɣed [ɪʁːəð] 'ashes', weḍḍaạ [wədˤːɑˤ] 'to be lost'. /dʒ/ and /dʒː/ are allophonic realizations of the same phoneme, both are common.

Consonants (Iqeřɛiyen variety)
		Labial		Dental		Alveolar		Post- alveolar		Palatal	Velar		Uvular	Pharyngeal	Glottal
		plain	phar.	plain	phar.	plain	phar.	plain	phar.	Palatal	plain	lab.	Uvular	Pharyngeal	Glottal
Nasal		m				n					ŋ				
Plosive	voiceless	p	pˤ			t	tˤ	tʃ			k	kːʷ	q		ʔ
Plosive	voiced	b				d	dˤ	dʒ			g	gːʷ			
Fricative	voiceless	f		θ		s	sˤ	ʃ	ʃˤ	ç	x ~ χ			ħ	
Fricative	voiced	β		ð	ðˤ	z	zˤ	ʒ		(ʝ)	ɣ ~ ʁ			ʕ	ɦ
Approximant						l	lˤ			j		w			
Flap						ɾ	ɾˤ								
Trill						r	rˤ								

Notes:

- /ʝ/ has become /j/ in most of Central Tarifit e.g. ayenduz [æjəndʊz] instead of aɡ̠enduz [æʝəndʊz] 'calf'.
- /ç/ has mostly become /ʃ/ in Central Tarifit and only occurs in a few words, e.g. seḵsu [səçsʊ] 'couscous'.
- Pharyngealization is a spreading feature, it may spread to a whole word.
- The only pharyngealized consonants common in Berber roots are /dˤ/, /ðˤ/, /zˤ/ and /rˤ/; the others seem to mainly occur in words of Arabic and Spanish origin.
- /ʃˤ/ seems to only occur in the nouns ucca [ʊˤʃˤ:ɑˤ] 'greyhound' and mucc [mʊˤʃˤ:] 'cat'.
- /ŋ/ occurs exclusively before the consonant /w/, it may be an assimilatory variant of n.
- Labialization only occurs with the geminates /kːʷ/ and /gːʷ/.

==== Assimilations ====
There are quite a few assimilations that occur with the feminine suffixes t and ṯ.

ḇ + ṯ = fṯ/ft (e.g. tajeǧeft < tajeǧeḇṯ 'gown/djellaba')
z + ṯ = sṯ/st (e.g. talwist < talwizṯ 'gold coin')
ẓ + ṯ = ṣṯ/ṣt (e.g. tayạạẓiṣt < tayạạẓiẓṯ 'hare')
j + ṯ = cṯ/ct (e.g. taɛejjact < taɛejjajṯ 'dust')
ɣ + ṯ = xṯ/xt (e.g. tmazixt < tmaziɣt 'Berber language')
ɛ + ṯ = ḥṯ/ḥt (e.g. tqubeḥt < tqubeɛṯ 'little bird')

There are also other assimilations.

ḏ + ṯ = tt (e.g. tabritt < tabriḏṯ 'path')
d + ṯ = tt (e.g. a t-tawi < a d-ṯawi 'she will bring here')
ḍ + ṯ = ṭṭ (e.g. tyaẓiṭṭ < tyaẓiḍṯ 'hen')
m + ṯ = nt (e.g. taxxant < taxxamṯ 'small room')
ř + ṯ = č (e.g. tameǧač < tameǧařṯ 'egg')

Spirantized consonants become stops after the consonant 'n', this occurs between words as well.

qqimen da < qqimen ḏa 'they sit here'
tilifun tameqqṛant < tilifun ṯameqqṛant 'the big phone'

=== Sound shifts ===
==== Zenati sound shifts ====
The initial masculine a- prefix is dropped in certain words, e.g., afus 'hand' becomes fus, and afiɣaṛ 'snake' becomes fiɣạạ. This change, characteristic of Zenati Berber varieties, distances Tarifit from neighbouring dialects such as Atlas-Tamazight and Shilha.

==== *l, *r and *ǧ ====
In the history of Tarifit, *l has shifted to a rhotic in many varieties. The shift is already present in the now-extinct variety of Arzew (Algeria), which was brought there by Riffian migrants in the mid-18th century, providing a terminus ante quem for the change. It triggered a chain of further changes: in most of these varieties it caused original *r to vocalize, while geminate *ll became the affricate ǧ ([d͡ʒ(ː)]), pushing original *ǧ to the fricative jj ([ʒː]). Four groups can be distinguished with respect to the reflexes of *l and *r:

- Group 1, the easternmost varieties, those of the Iznasen and Kebdana. These preserve the original consonants:
  - *l → [l]
  - *r → [ɾ]
- Group 2, the varieties of the Metalsa, Boqqoya and Temsamane:
  - *l → [rʲ]
  - *r → [ɾ]
- Group 3, the varieties of the Beni Saïd, Beni Oulichek, Temsamane, Beni Touzine and Beni Ouariaghel:
  - *l → [r]
  - *r → [ɾ]
- Group 4, the varieties of the Guelaya and the city of Al Hoceima:
  - *l → [ɾ]
  - *r → [ɾ]

The reflexes of *ll and *ǧ follow almost the same boundaries:

- Group 1, the Iznasen and Kebdana:
  - *ll → [lː]
  - *ǧ → [d͡ʒ(ː)]
- Group 2, the Metalsa and Beni Bou Yhi:
  - *ll → [dʲː]
  - *ǧ → [d͡ʒ(ː)]
- Group 3, most other varieties:
  - *ll → [d͡ʒ(ː)]
  - *ǧ → [ʒː]

Vocalized *r also affects a preceding vowel: some studies report a difference in vowel length between vowels adjacent to vocalized *r and other vowels, while others report only a heightening effect, e.g. aři [æɾɪ] vs ari [aɾɪ].

==== R vocalization ====
Postvocalic /r/ preceding a consonantal coda is vocalized, as in taddart > taddaat 'house/home'. Thus in tamara 'hard work/misery' the /r/ is conserved because it precedes a vowel. These sound shifts do not occur in the easternmost Tarifit dialects of Icebdanen and Iznasen and the westernmost dialects beyond Ayt Waayaɣeř.

== Writing system ==
Like other Berber languages, Tarifit has been written with several different systems over the years. Unlike the nearby Tashelhit, Riffian Berber has little written literature before the twentieth century. The first written examples of Tarifit start appearing just before the colonial period. Texts like R. Basset (1897) and S. Biarnay (1917) are transcribed in the Latin alphabet but they are transcribed in a rather deficient way. Most recently (since 2003), Tifinagh has become official throughout Morocco. The Berber Latin alphabet continues to be the most used writing system online and in most publications in Morocco and abroad.

== Grammar ==
=== Nouns ===
Tarifiyt has two genders, masculine and feminine. In countable nouns with Berber affixes, gender is derivative: in principle, every masculine noun has a feminine counterpart. Gender derivation is relatively straightforward. The feminine is derived from the masculine form by adding an element /t-/ to the prefix, and a suffix /-t/, as in most Berber languages. With humans and higher animals, masculine and feminine mark natural gender, e.g.

aḥenjia (M) 'boy' → taḥenjiat (F) 'girl'
ayyaw (M) 'grandson' → tayyawt (F) 'granddaughter'
asaadun (M) 'male mule' → tasaadunt (F) 'female mule'
afunas (M) 'ox' → tafunast (F) 'cow'

For a few basic items there exist suppletive pairs, e.g.

aayaz (M) 'man' → tamɣaat (F) 'woman'
amyan (M) 'he-goat' → tɣaṭṭ (F) 'she-goat'
icarri (M) 'ram' → tixsi (F) 'ewe'
yis (M) 'horse' → řɛawda (F) 'mare'

Tarifiyt countable nouns distinguish a singular from a plural. Masculine plurals generally take the prefix /i-/, feminines /ti-/, and take the suffix /-en/ in the masculine and /-in/ in the feminine, e.g.

axxam (SG) 'room' → ixxamen (PL) 'rooms'
tafunast (SG) 'cow' → tifunasin (PL) 'cows'

A few nouns have suppletive plurals:

uma (SG) 'my brother' → ayetma (PL) 'my brothers'
učma (SG) 'my sister' → issma (PL) 'my sisters'

Nouns with Berber affixes distinguish two forms, which are related to the syntactic context and function of the noun, "Free State" and "Annexed State". The Annexed State is used for subjects placed after the verb, after all prepositions except ař and břa, as a posttopic put in extraposition to the central clause and after a few prenominal elements. The Annexed State is formed as follows: in masculines, initial /a/ becomes /we/ and initial /i/ becomes /ye/. In feminines, initial /ta/ usually becomes /te/ and initial /ti/ also usually becomes /te/, e.g.

asnus → wesnus 'donkey foal (M)'
tasnust → tesnust 'donkey foal (F)'
isnas → yesnas 'donkey foals (M)'
tisnas → tesnas 'donkey foal (F)'

In the Annexed State of the masculine, the high vowels u and i are used instead of the semivowels w and y when the noun stem starts with a consonant followed by a vowel (including schwa). The feminine AS prefix does not have schwa under this condition. This has to do with the constraint on schwa in open syllables, e.g.

afunas → ufunas 'bull'
tafunast → tfunast 'cow'
ifunasen → ifunasen 'bulls'
tifunasin → tfunasin 'cows'

== Lexicon ==
=== Basic vocabulary ===
1	water	aman (plurale tantum)	[æ.mæn]
2	nose	tinzaa (plurale tantum)	[θɪn.za]
3	to run	azzeř	[æz.zəɾ]
4	fire	timessi	[θɪ.məs.sɪ]
5	mouth	aqemmum, imi	[a.qɐm.mʊm], [ɪ.mɪ]
6	tongue	iřes	[ɪ.ɾəs]
7	meat	aysum ~ aksum	[æj.sʊm] ~ [æç.sʊm]
8	bone	iɣess	[ɪ.ʁɐsː]
9	clothes	aṛṛud	[ɑɾˤ.ɾˤʊðˤ]
10	word	awař	[æ.wæɾ]
11	neck	iri	[ɪ.ɾɪ]
12	people	iwdan	[ɪw.ðæn]
13	why?	mayemmi, maɣaa	[mæ.jəm.mɪ], [ma.ʁa]
14	to eat	cc	[ʃː]
15	to cut	qess ~ qqes	[qɐsː] ~ [qːɐs]
15	to be scared	ggʷed	[ɡʷːəð]
16	cold	aṣemmaḍ	[ɑ.sˤɐmˤ.mˤɑðˤ]
17	room	axxam	[aχ.χam]
18	to write	ari	[a.ɾɪ]
19	dog	aqzin, aydi	[aq.zɪn], [æj.ðɪ]
20	when?	meřmi	[məɾ.mɪ]
21	to speak	siweř	[sɪ.wəɾ]
22	cow	afunas	[ɛ.fʊ.nɛs]

=== Loanwords ===
Tarifit has loaned a fair amount of its vocabulary from Arabic, Spanish and French. Around 51.7% of the vocabulary of Tarifit is estimated to have been borrowed (56.1% of nouns and 44.1% of verbs). All loaned verbs follow Tarifit conjugations, and some loaned nouns are Berberized as well. A lot of loans are not recognizable because of sound shifts that have undergone, e.g. ǧiřet [dʒːɪrəθ] 'night' (Arabic: al-layla), hřec [ɦrəʃ] 'sick' (Arabic: halaka).

==== Examples of words loaned from Classical/Moroccan Arabic ====
- ddenya: 'world' (orig. al-dunyā الدنيا)
- tayezzaat: 'island' (orig. jazīra جزيرة)
- řebḥaa: 'ocean' (orig. al-baḥr البحر)
- lwalidin: 'parents' (orig. al-wālidayn الوالدين)
- ḥseb: 'to count' (orig. ḥasaba حسب)

==== Examples of words loaned from Spanish ====
- familiya: 'family' (orig. familia)
- tpabut: 'duck' (orig. pavo)
- ṣpiṭạạ: 'hospital' (orig. hospital)
- pṛubaa: 'to try' (orig. probar)
- arrimaa: 'to land' (orig. arrimar)

==== Examples of words loaned from French ====
- maamiṭa: 'pot' (orig. marmite)
- furciṭa: 'fork' (orig. fourchette)
- ṣuṣis: 'sausage' (orig. saucisse)
- fumaḍa: 'cream' (orig. pommade)
- jjarḍa: 'garden' (orig. jardin)

==== Examples of words loaned from Latin ====
- faacu: 'eagle' (orig. falco)
- aqninni: 'rabbit' (orig. cuniculus)
- fiřu: 'thread' (orig. filum)
- aɣaṛṛabu: 'boat' (orig. carabus)
- asnus: 'donkey foal' (orig. asinus)

== Sample text ==
From 'An introduction to Tarifiyt Berber (Nador, Morocco)' by Khalid Mourigh and Maarten Kossmann: Sirkuḷasyun (trafic)

A: Ssalamuɛlikum.
A‍: peace.upon.you(PL)
A: Hello.

B: Waɛlikumssalam.
B‍: and.upon.you(PL).peace
B: Hello.

A: Teẓṛid lakṣiḍa-nni yewqɛen?
A‍: you(SG).saw accident-that happening
A: Did you see the (car) crash that happened?

B: Lla, sřiɣ xas waha.
B‍: no i.heard on.it only
B: No, I only heard about it.

A: Tewqeɛ deggʷ brid n Wezɣenɣan.
A‍: it(F).happened in road(AS) of zeghanghane(AS)
A: It happened on the Zeghanghane road.

B: Wah, lakṣiḍa d tameqqṛant.
B‍: yes accident PRED big(F:SG:FS)
B: Yeah, it was a big (car) crash.

A: Abrid ibelleɛ maṛṛa.
A‍: road(FS) it.is.closed all
A: The whole road is closed.

B: Immut din ca n yijjen?
B‍: he.died there some of one(M:AS)
B: Did anybody die there?

A: Wah, yemmut ijjen waayaz d mmi-s, msakin.
A‍: yes he.died one man(AS) and son-his poor.guys
A: Yes, one man and his son died, the poor guys.

B: Mamec temsaa?
B‍: how it(F).happened
B: How did it happen?

A: Yesḥạạq ssṭupp uca tudef daysen ijjen ṭṭumubin.
A‍: he.burned traffic.light then it(F).entered in.them(M) one car
A: He crossed the red light and then a car hit them.

B: Tuɣa itazzeř ɛini. Iwa, a ten-yạạḥem sid-ạạbbi.
B‍: PAST he.runs probably well AD them(M:DO)-he.has.mercy sir-lord
B: He was probably speeding. Well, may them rest in peace.

A: Ttḥawař waha, din aṭṭas n ṭṭumubinat.
A‍: be.careful! only there much(FS) of cars
A: Just be careful. There are many cars.

B: A wah, yewseɣ uqedduḥ.
B‍: o yes it(M).is.many tin.can(AS)
B: Yes, there are many tin cans (i.e. cars).

== Sources ==
- Biarnay, Samuel (1911). Étude sur le dialecte des Bet't'ioua du Vieil-Arzeu. Alger: A. Jourdan. OCLC 458532850.
- Biarnay, Samuel (1917). Étude sur les dialectes berbères du Rif: Lexique, textes et notes de phonétique (in French). Paris: Leroux.
- Cadi, Kaddour (1987). Système verbal rifain: forme et sens; linguistique tamaziqht (Nord Marocain). Études ethno-linguistiques Maghreb-Sahara. Paris: Peeters. ISBN 978-2-85297-195-0.
- Colin, Georges Séraphin (1929). "Le parler berbère des Gmara" (PDF). Hespéris. 9: 43–58.
- Kossmann, Maarten (2000). Esquisse grammaticale du rifain oriental. M. S. - Ussun amazigh. Paris: Peeters. ISBN 978-90-429-0892-5.
- Lafkioui, Mena (2007). Atlas linguistique des variétés berbères du Rif (in French). Köln: Rüdiger Köppe. ISBN 978-3-89645-395-2.
- McClelland, Clive (1996). "Interrelations of Prosody, Clause Structure and Discourse Pragmatics in Tarifit Berber". Faculty Dissertations.
- McClelland, Clive W. (2000). The Interrelations of Syntax, Narrative Structure, and Prosody in a Berber Language. Edwin Mellen Press. ISBN 978-0-7734-7740-7.
- Mourigh, Khalid; Kossmann, Maarten (2019). An Introduction to Tarifiyt Berber (Nador, Morocco). Ugarit-Verlag. ISBN 978-3-86835-307-5.
- Renisio, Amédée (1932). Étude sur les dialectes berbères des Beni Iznassen, du Rif, et des Senhaja de Sraïr: grammaire, textes et lexique (in French). Paris: E. Leroux.
- Abarrou, Jamâl (2023). Dictionnaire rifain-français illustré: Le parler d'Ayt Weryaghel (Rif central). Maroc (in French). Editions L'Harmattan. ISBN 978-2-14-032788-9.
