= 2024 Moroccan census =

2024 census of Morocco's population by the Moroccan government

2024 census of Morocco
- September 2024

General information
- Country: Morocco
- Authority: High Commission for Planning
- Website: www.hcp.ma/Plateforme-interactive-du-RGPH-2024_a4026.html

Results
- Total population: 36,828,330 (▲8.80%)

The 2024 Moroccan census was held in Morocco from 1 to 30 September of that year. The census was conducted by the High Planning Commission (HCP). The previous census was in 2014.

== Operation ==
The budget for the census was estimated at 1.46 billion Dirhams. The allocations were 67% for participant compensation, 20% for material and logistical resources, and 13% for technological resources. In-person training for inspectors and investigators were held between August 15 and 27, the site reconnaissance phase was held in August 30 and 31, the data collection phase took place from September 1 to 30. Graduates and students comprised 60% of participants, while 32% were from the education sector.

The census used a 2-part questionnaire to collect data from households. The 1st questionnaire covers demographic structures and topics such as international migration and mortality, while the 2nd, more detailed questionnaire includes these elements alongside questions on new topics such as social protection, the use of information and communication technologies, and the environment. The 2nd questionnaire was addressed to the entire population of communes with fewer than 2,000 households and to a 20% sample of households in municipalities with 2,000 or more households, whereas the short questionnaire was addressed to the remaining 80%.

== Findings ==
The Kingdom's population was counted at 36,828,330, an increase of 2,980,088 inhabitants since the 2014 figure of 33,848,242, representing a rise of 8.80%.

The number of households was counted at 9,275,038, an increase of 1,961,232 from the 2014 figure of 7,313,806, representing a significant rise of 26.82%.

The number of foreign residents increased to 148,152, an increase of 61,946 since the 2014 figure of 86,206, representing a rise of 71.86%.

The average annual growth rate was 0.85% between 2014 and 2024. This demographic slowdown was accompanied by increasing Urbanization, reaching 62.8% of the population, compared to 51.4% in 1994. The seven largest cities concentrate 37.8% of the urban population, Casablanca occupying 1st place with more than 3.23 million inhabitants, followed by Tangier (1.27 million), Fez (1.18 million) and Marrakesh (1.01 million).

Life expectancy rose to 76.4 years in 2024 (from only 47 years in 1960), while the Total fertility rate fell to 1.97 children per woman (from 7.2 children per woman in 1960), a Sub-replacement fertility rate. According to Fouzia Daoudim, an expert in demography and statistics, the country entered into Demographic window, as the shifts in the age structure have led to a significant increase in the potential workforce, projected to rise from 22.1 million in 2024 to nearly 24.8 million by 2040.

== Reactions and controversy ==
=== Execution and incidents ===
The data collection process saw a slight increase in the rate of refusal to participate, which varied from 0.29% at the start (17,676 cases) to 0.4% by the operation's end (3,443 cases), some refusals came from intellectuals and jurists, prompting authorities to engage building wardens and local officials to gather the necessary information. Various reasons for refusal were encountered; from skepticism about the census’s usefulness to fear that gathered information could jeopardize eligibility for social assistance. The census also coincided with the start of the school year, a period of financial stress for many families.

149 incidents involving census workers were recorded in total, with the injured participants receiving necessary care, some 92 electronic tablets were damaged and 22 were stolen, 14 of which were later recovered by law enforcement.

=== Methodological debate on the Amazigh language ===
The HCP addressed the intense public debate over result of the percentage of Tamazight speakers, as the census recorded only 24.8% of the population using Tamazight in daily life. The HCP defended their findings, stating that the census adhered to standards set by the United Nations Statistics Division, explaining that the census measures daily language use, distinguishing it from Language proficiency, meaning individuals who speak Tamazight but do not use it on a daily basis were not included in the percentage. The census found 33.3% of rural residents used Tamazight on a daily basis compared to 19.9% in urban areas, resulting in the overall figure of 24.8%.

This figure represents a slight decrease from 25.8% in 2014 and 27.5% in 2004. The agency attributed the trend to factors such as increased urbanization, Internal migration, and changes in linguistic practices.

=== Socioeconomic analysis ===
Geopolitical analyst Rachid Achachi argued that the combination of dropping fertility rates and rising life expectancy indicates that Morocco has begun a transition toward an aging population profile (often suffering from rapidly declining health) while it is still a Developing country, meanwhile many in the youth population, expected to finance the pension and social security systems, face high Unemployment or are employed in Informal economy, limiting their potential contribution. He argues Morocco must prioritize long-term investment in Human capital alongside physical infrastructure to reduce the demographic risks.
