= October 1958 =

Month of 1958

<<	October 1958					>>
Su	Mo	Tu	We	Th	Fr	Sa
			1	2	3	4
5	6	7	8	9	10	11
12	13	14	15	16	17	18
19	20	21	22	23	24	25
26	27	28	29	30	31

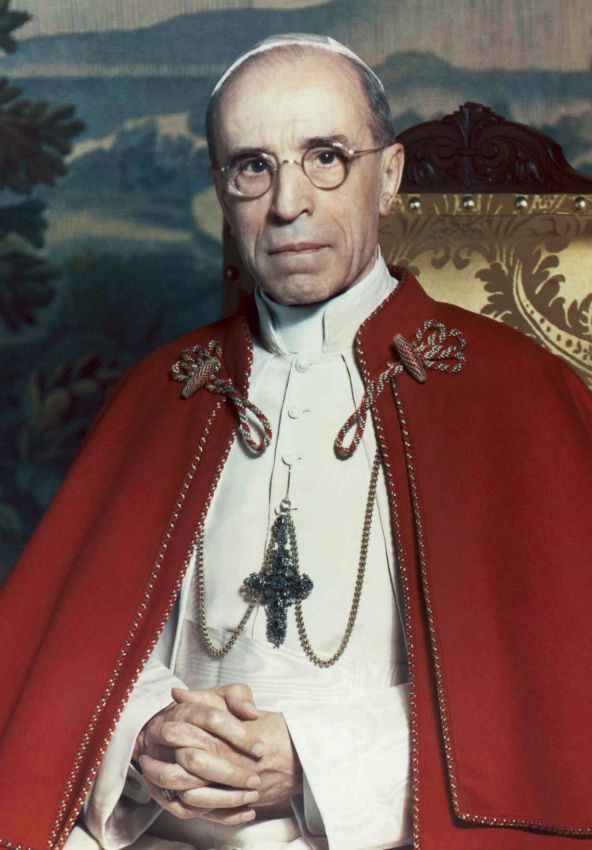
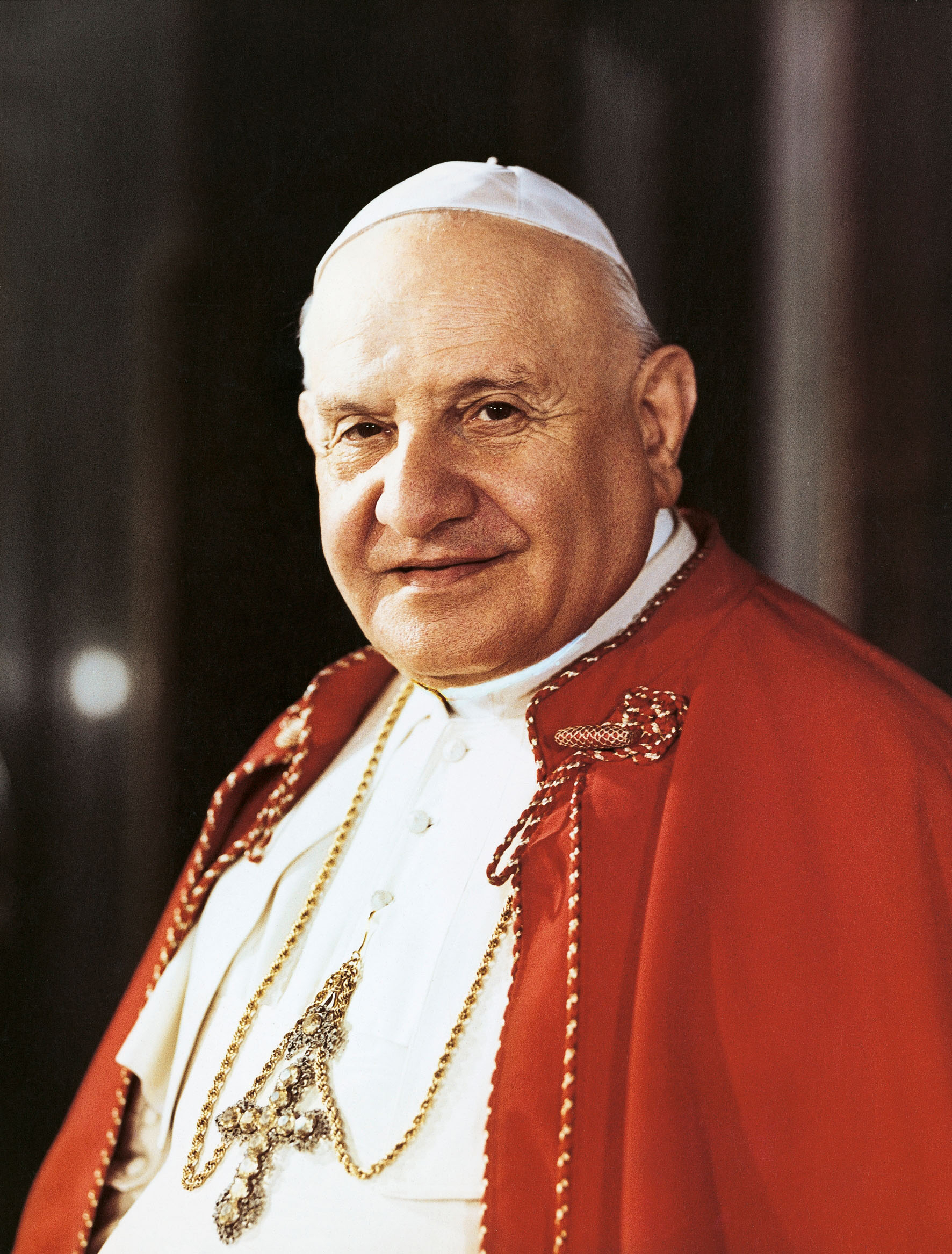
October 9, 1958: Pope Pius XII dies, succeeded by Pope John XXIII on October 28

The following events occurred in October 1958:

== October 1, 1958 (Wednesday) ==
- China inaugurated its second TV broadcaster, Shanghai Television, 29 days after launching Peking Television.
- India adopted the metric system of measurement to replace the Imperial units that had been the standard under British rule.
- Tunisia and Morocco joined the Arab League.
- The United Kingdom transferred sovereignty of Christmas Island from Singapore to Australia.
- L'Union pour la nouvelle République (UNR), a new political party organized by French Prime Minister Charles de Gaulle and many of his supporters who had been part of the Social Republicans (Centre national des républicains sociaux or CNRS), was founded to field candidates for the November 23 parliamentary elections.
- Nigeria Airways began operations as West African Airways Corporation Nigeria (WAAC) with a Boeing 377 Stratocruiser for long range flights between Lagos and London, and several Douglas DC-3 airplanes to fly to Dakar in Senegal.
- The National Aeronautics and Space Administration, NASA, started operations and replaced the National Advisory Committee for Aeronautics (NACA) as the United States space agency. The nonmilitary space projects which had been conducted by the Advanced Research Projects Agency were transferred to the jurisdiction of the NASA.
- Born:
  - Mark Bathum, American paralympic Alpine skier; in Seattle
- Died:
  - Itzikl Kramtweiss, 92, Russian-born American musician who specialized in the klezmer music form
  - Antonijs Springovičs, 81, Latvian Roman Catholic priest and Archbishop of Riga since 1923

== October 2, 1958 (Thursday) ==
Guinea's old flag

Guinea's new flag

- The West African nation of Guinea declared itself independent from France, with colonial prime minister Ahmed Sékou Touré as its first president, by a vote of the colonial legislators of the Assembly of French Guinea. The parliament renamed itself the "Constituent Assembly of the Republic of Guinea", and lowered the French Tricolore flag, but had no flag to raise in its place over the Assembly Building in Conakry (and would not until November 10). In retaliation for Guinea having become the lone French colony to vote against becoming a member of the French Community, the former French colonial administrators began removing all colonial government property, and France halted payment of pensions to Guinean soldiers who had fought for France during World War One and World War Two. According to a 1984 account after Touré's death, "as a warning to other French-speaking territories, the French pulled out of Guinea over a two-month period, taking everything they could with them. They unscrewed light bulbs, removed plans for sewage pipelines in Conakry, the capital, and even burned medicines rather than leave them for the Guineans."
- A Touch of the Poet, a play completed by Eugene O'Neill in 1942 but never staged during his lifetime, was performed for the first time, premiering almost five years after his death. The initial run of 284 performances at The Little Theatre on Broadway starred Helen Hayes and Eric Portman, and featured Betty Field and Kim Stanley in supporting roles. The play would be revived three times on Broadway between 1967 and 2005.
- Born:
  - Dr. Augusto Cury, Brazilian psychiatrist and popular writer who pioneered the Multifocal Theory regarding human cognition; in Colina, São Paulo state
  - Daniel Peacock, English TV comedian; in Hammersmith, Middlesex
- Died: Marie Stopes, 77, British scientist and women's rights activist

== October 3, 1958 (Friday) ==
- Television Iran (TVI) began broadcasting from Tehran, bringing the first TV programming to the Middle Eastern kingdom. Initially, the station, founded by industrialist Habib Sabet, featured locally produced quiz shows, and American TV shows that were re-dubbed into the Persian language, Farsi. The general manager was Vance Hallack, an American TV executive for NBC and later for Baghdad Television in Iraq.
- France's Prime Minister Charles de Gaulle spoke to an audience at the Algerian city of Constantine and unveiled his proposed economic development program to bring the standard of living for Algerians closer to that of Metropolitan France within five years. The Constantine Plan was also intended to weaken support for independence activists and to prevent foreign intervention from the Soviet Union. The plan would fail to prevent Algerian independence, which would happen in 1962. While the crowd applauded de Gaulle, most of them refused to join him in a singing of the French national anthem, "La Marseillaise".
- French explorer Alain Bombard, an expert on survival-at-sea, was one of only five survivors in rough seas off the coast of the French town of Étel, after a wave capsized a rubber dinghy that he and six crew were testing, and a second wave capsized the lifeboat and crew of seven more that came to the rescue. Nine of the 14 people on board were swept away in the waters of the Bay of Biscay. A nearby tugboat saved Dr. Bombard and four men, while another boat located eight of the nine bodies.
- Elections were held in Brazil for the 326 seats of the Câmara dos Deputados and 21 of the 63 seats of the Senado Federal. Candidates from nine different political parties ran for office, with President Juscelino Kubitschek's Partido Social Democrático (PSD) and its coalition candidates winning 37% of the vote.
- The Committee on Space Research (COSPAR) was founded by representatives of the U.S., the Soviet Union and other world powers at a meeting of the General Assembly of the International Council of Scientific Institutions.
- Studies and plans of the American crewed satellite project were presented to the Advanced Research Projects Agency.
- Died: Margarita Morozova, 83, Russian socialite, patron of the arts and philanthropist in Imperial Russia, who later lived in poverty in the Soviet Union after the confiscation of her properties.

== October 4, 1958 (Saturday) ==
- The new Constitution of France was signed into law, establishing the French Fifth Republic with a 576-member Assemblée Nationale elected directly by the people. The upper house of the French Parliament, the 309-member Sénat, was elected later by municipal representatives rather than by popular vote. The parliament's powers were limited, and the President of France had broad authority to promulgate regulations. A nine-member Constitutional Council had the authority to review statutes and executive regulations to determine whether they conformed to the new constitution.
- The first transatlantic jet airplane service flight took place as the British Overseas Airways Corporation (BOAC) began using the new De Havilland Comet 4 aircraft. The first flight took off from London's Heathrow Airport at 9:55 in the morning toward Idlewild (now JFK International) Airport in New York City, where it arrived 10 hours later with 32 passengers, including BOAC Chairman Gerard d'Erlanger. Two hours and six minutes after the BOAC flight departed London, another Comet 4 took off from New York, bound for London, and crossed the Atlantic in only 6 hours and 12 minutes, compared to 11½ hours for the same eastward trip in a piston-driven airliner. The flight came 22 days ahead of Pan American World Airways (Pan Am)'s October 26 flight with the Boeing 707 jet.
- Cooke Air Force Base in southern California was renamed Vandenberg Air Force Base in honor of the late Hoyt Vandenberg, a 4-star general who had served as the second Chief of Staff of the U.S. Air Force from 1948 to 1953.

== October 5, 1958 (Sunday) ==
- Moeslim Taher, a 24-year-old professor, founded Jayabaya University, a private university in Jakarta in Indonesia, which originally had only 11 students. As of 2022, it has more than 4,000 students.
- Two years after U.S. oil prospector James W. Menhall discovered the Karatchok oil field in Syria, the United Arab Republic nationalized the Syrian oil industry and confiscated the Menhall Company's equipment and three drilling rigs without compensation.
- Congolese nationalists from different ethnic groups, seeking independence from Belgium, founded the Mouvement National Congolais (MNC) political party in the Belgian Congo. Patrice Lumumba of Tetela ethnicity, and Cyrille Adoula and Joseph Iléo of Bangala origin, signed the MNC charter. Joseph Kasa-Vubu, a Kongo leader, refused to join the group. Kasa-Vubu would become the first president upon Congolese independence, and Lumumba the first prime minister.
- Clinton High School in the U.S., a formerly all-white school in Clinton, Tennessee that had admitted 12 African-American students in 1956, was heavily damaged by a series of dynamite explosions, apparently placed by opponents of racial desegregation. Nobody was injured in the blast, but the school sustained $300,000 worth of damages, equivalent to three million dollars 60 years later.
- Born:
  - Dr. André Kuipers, Dutch physician and astronaut who spent 203 days in two Soyuz missions to the International Space Station; in Amsterdam
  - Manuel Landeta (stage name for José Manuel Goenaga), Mexican TV actor
  - Raul "Rolly" Quizon, Philippine comedian and TV actor; in Manila (d. 2018)
  - Neil deGrasse Tyson, American astrophysicist, author, and TV host; in New York City
- Died: William F. Buckley Sr., 77, American lawyer and oil magnate

== October 6, 1958 (Monday) ==
- The government of Pakistan suppressed a brief rebellion by Yar Khan of Kalat, who had been ruler of the Khanate of Kalat from 1933 to 1947, when Pakistan had been part of British India and Kalat was one of the princely states. Police in Pakistan's Balochistan province raided the Khan's palace and charged him with sedition.
- Continental Classroom, an educational television program offered in the early morning hours by the NBC television network in the U.S., went on the air as the first widely seen distance learning program that offered college credit. While correspondence courses had been a staple around the world since the 19th century, Continental Classroom was the first distance learning program taught simultaneously to students across the United States. The program, designed to upgrade science education, continued until 1963, providing instruction starting with a physics course and a chemistry course in the first year. The premiere half-hour episode, at 6:30, was conducted by Dr. Harvey Elliott White, professor of physics at the University of California, who had as his guest Professor James R. Killian Jr., president of the Massachusetts Institute of Technology.
- Personnel from the Langley Research Center visited the Army Ballistic Missile Agency to open negotiations for procuring Redstone and Jupiter launch vehicles for crewed satellite projects.
- Died: Lieutenant Colonel Klavdia Fomicheva, 40, Soviet Russian fighter pilot during World War II and Heroine of the Soviet Union, died after a prolonged illness.

== October 7, 1958 (Tuesday) ==
- Pakistan's President Iskander Mirza suspended the Asian nation's constitution, fired Prime Minister Feroz Khan Noon, declared martial law and appointed General Muhammad Ayub Khan to command the Pakistani Armed Forces and to enforce military rule.
- In the mountainous Rif region of northern Morocco, Mohammed Sellam Amezian of the Berbers minority instigated rioting against the French military presence by demanding the eviction of the French population and the return to Morocco of Abd el-Krim, who had briefly governed a breakaway republic before being arrested and sent into exile in 1926. The uprising would last until March 13, 1959.
- U.S. President Dwight D. Eisenhower gave the authorization for "Project Astronaut", to select and train military pilots to become the first Americans to travel into outer space. On the same day, studies and plans of the project were presented to Dr. T. Keith Glennan, NASA Administrator, who approved the project by saying, in effect, "Let's get on with it." Glennan would officially announce the project on December 17 as Project Mercury.
- Born:
  - Timothy Ackroyd, British stage actor; in London
  - Tomio Imamura, Japan Karate Association champion 1988 and 1990, and master of Shotokan karate; in Kagoshima Prefecture

== October 8, 1958 (Wednesday) ==
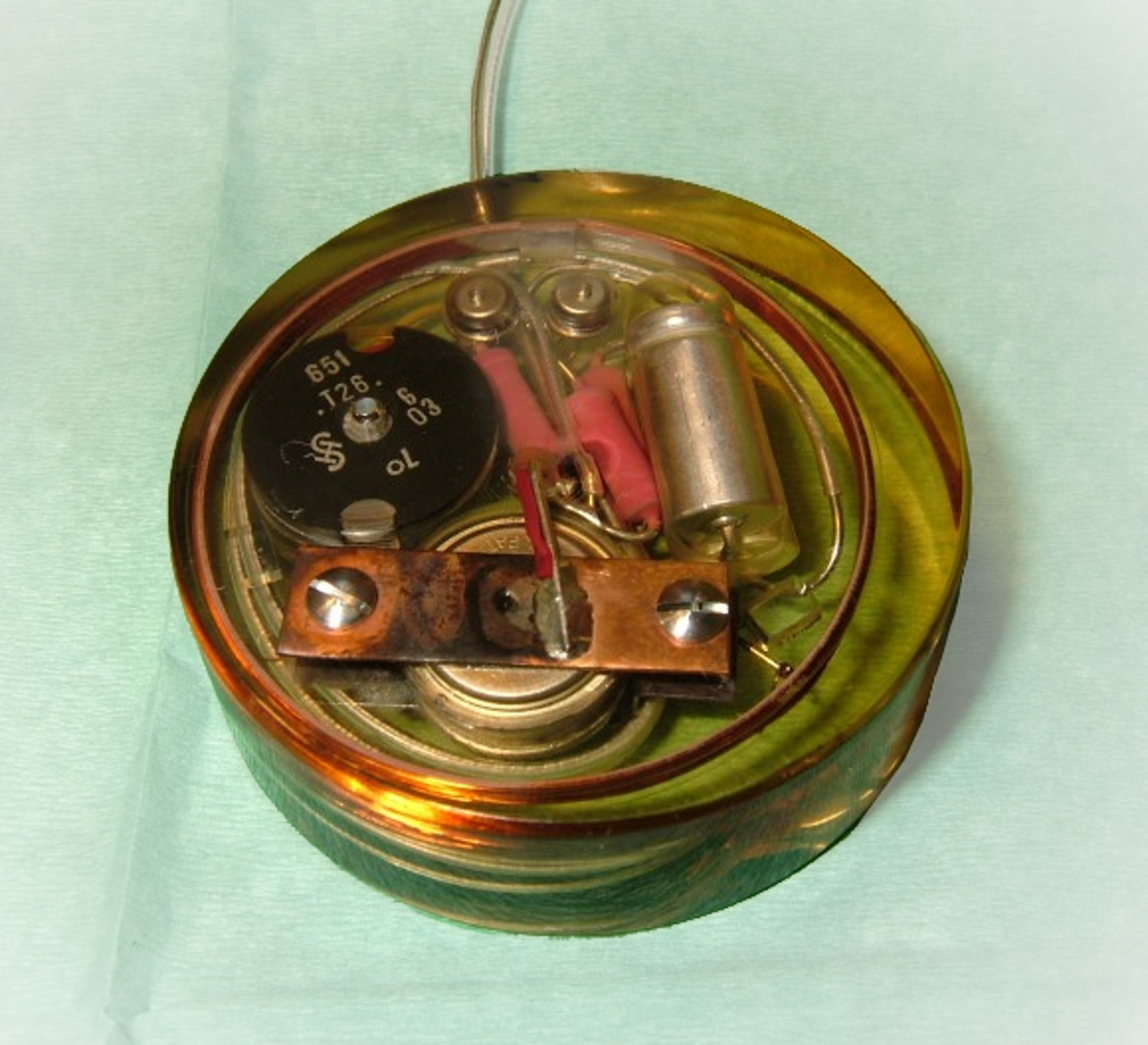
Elmqvist and Senning's pacemaker

- Arne Larsson, a 43-year-old engineer in Sweden, became the first human being to receive a heart pacemaker. A heart surgeon at the Karolinska Institute in Solna, Dr. Åke Senning, implanted the experimental device (which inventor Rune Elmqvist and he had designed), into Mr. Larsson after Mrs. Larsson had pleaded with them to save her husband. The battery of the first implant failed after eight hours and Senning implanted the only other model into Larsson, who would live 43 more years after the first surgery.
- The Space Task Group was unofficially established.
- The New York Yankees, who had lost three of the first four games of the World Series, then won Game 5, forced a seventh game in the best-4-of-7 championship. The Milwaukee Braves, defending champions of Major League Baseball, had a 2 to 1 lead after five innings before the Yankees scored, leaving the score tied, 2 to 2 after nine innings. In the 10th inning, the Yankees scored two runs on Gil McDougald's homer for a 4 to 2 lead. The Braves then scored a run and, with two outs, still had the potential tying run on third base, with another runner on first base. Frank Torre hit to right field "but McDougald, the Yankee second baseman and the hero apparent because of his homer, tore back on the grass. He leaped high in the air and pulled down the ball, which suddenly had lost its height and momentum," for the third out.
- Born: Ursula von der Leyen, Belgian-born German politician and President of the European Commission since 2019; in Ixelles
- Died:
  - Frank Kramer, 78, American bicyclist who won 16 consecutive U.S. championships from 1901 to 1916 and world champion, 1912.
  - Merle L. Youngs, 71, American entrepreneur whose companies, Youngs Rubber Corporation and Holland-Rantos, manufactured and promoted one of the world's most popular condoms, the Trojan brand.

== October 9, 1958 (Thursday) ==
- Pope Pius XII, born as Eugenio Pacelli and Roman Catholic pontiff since 1939, died at the age of 82 after a reign of 19 years. The Pope had suffered a sudden stroke three days earlier. The official announcement from Castel Gandolfo in the Vatican stated, "The Supreme Pontiff, Pope Pius XII, is dead. Pius XII, the most esteemed and venerated man in the world, one of the greatest Pontiffs of the century, with sanctity passed away at 3:52 A.M., October 9, 1958." Cardinal Aloisi Masella was elected by the cardinals present as the Camerlengo, or Chamberlain, to administer church affairs until a new Pope could be elected.
- In behalf of the crewed satellite project, an air drop program for full-scale parachute and landing system development was started at Langley.
- The New York Yankees won the World Series in Game 7 of the best-4-of-7 major league baseball championship, defeating the Milwaukee Braves, 6 to 2, after having almost been eliminated the day before. The game had been tied, 2-2, after seven innings but in the eighth, with two outs, Yogi Berra scored a run for the Yankees.Bill Skowron hit a home run with men on first and second the bases and drove in three more runs.
- All 19 U.S. Air Force personnel on a C-123 transport plane were killed, including five pilots on the U.S. Air Force Thunderbirds air show team, when the aircraft flew into a flock of geese and went down near the town of Payette, Idaho. Most of the other crash victims worked at maintaining the Thunderbirds' aircraft.
- Born: Satoko Fujii, Japanese avant-garde jazz pianist; in Tokyo

== October 10, 1958 (Friday) ==
- Commodore International, known for creating the most popular personal computer of the early 1980s, the Commodore 64, was incorporated by Jack Tramiel and Manfred Kapp in Canada as Commodore Portable Typewriter, Ltd., initially to import and sell Czechoslovak-manufactured portable typewriters.
- The TransCanada pipeline, at 2,300 miles (3,700 km) from Burstall, Saskatchewan to Montreal in Quebec the longest natural gas pipeline in the world at the time, was completed to transport gas from the production fields in Alberta.
- A battle began in the Alto Paraguay Department of the remote Gran Chaco area of northern Paraguay, as hostile members of the indigenous Ayoreo people surrounded 24 American and Paraguayan engineers at a camp managed by the Pure Oil Company. For the next 32 hours, the camp near Fortin Madrejon was under siege by Ayoreo spears and arrows until troops from the Paraguayan Army came to the rescue in the early morning hours of October 12.
- Born: Tanya Tucker, American country music singer; in Seminole, Texas

== October 11, 1958 (Saturday) ==
- The United States and the Soviet Union, taking advantage of the conditions for a launch of a probe to the Moon, launched lunar spacecraft the same day, and both were unsuccessful in reaching their target. Pioneer 1 became the first spacecraft launched by the newly formed agency NASA. Sent from Cape Canaveral as the payload of a Thor-Able missile, the probe went into Earth orbit and stayed up for 43 hours, reaching an apogee of 70,700 miles (113,800 km). A few hours later, the Soviet Luna E-1 No.2 was sent from the Baikonur Cosmodrome as the payload of a Luna 8K72 rocket, but disintegrated two minutes and four seconds after launch. The failed Soviet attempt was not reported by that nation's press, which normally waited until after a success to reveal a launch, although the U.S. liftoff was in the Soviet Union's news with an emphasis on the deviation of the rocket from its intended course.
- Grandstand, one of the United Kingdom's longest-running sports programs (lasting more than 38 years) premiered on BBC1, with Peter Dimmock as the presenter.
- Died:
  - Maurice de Vlaminck, 82, French painter
  - Johannes R. Becher, 67, East German politician who served as the Cultural Minister of East Germany from 1954 to 1958 until his demotion by the ruling SED Party and spent his final months as a critic of Communism

== October 12, 1958 (Sunday) ==
- Alexei Larionov, the General Secretary of the Communist Party Committee for Russia's Ryazan Oblast, met with the Soviet Communist Party's Chairman, Nikita Khrushchev, and convinced the Soviet Premier that the farms of Ryazan could triple the production of meat within a single year. The result was the launching by the Soviet Party of Larionov's pledge, and Larionov's "Ryazan miracle", fulfilled by fraud. A year later, Ryazan would deliver 150,000 tons of meat to the Soviet government, three times the amount delivered at the end of 1958. It would turn out that Larionov had ordered the slaughter of most of the Ryazan farmers' livestock and had used agricultural funds intended for other purposes to purchase meat from neighboring oblasts. After his deceit was exposed, Larionov would commit suicide in 1960.
- A dynamite bomb charge wrecked one of Atlanta's largest synagogues, the Hebrew Benevolent Congregation Temple, after Rabbi Jacob M. Rothschild had lobbied for racial equality in Atlanta. The next day, five suspects were arrested and indicted at the end of the week one of whom confessed and implicated the anti-Semitic and racist National States' Rights Party. The suspect would later retract his confession and be acquitted after two trials, and nobody would ever be convicted of the bombing, which took place days after the bombing of Clinton High School in Tennessee.
- A total eclipse of the Sun became the first to be observed and studied by Earth rockets, as a U.S. Navy ship fired eight Nike-Asp rockets equipped with cameras and other instruments. The area over which the eclipse was visible from Earth was limited to a few islands in the South Pacific Ocean and the South American nation of Chile. The rocket tests confirmed that disruption of earth's ionosphere and radio communications came from x-radiation from the corona of the Sun, and that ultraviolet radiation originated from the chromosphere of the Sun.

== October 13, 1958 (Monday) ==
- France's premier Charles de Gaulle, acting within his emergency rule authority as commander of the nation's armed forces, ordered all members of the French Army to avoid involvement in politics and to permit free legislative elections in French Algeria to take place on November 23. Major General Jacques Massu, who had led the revolution by French Algerians against the government on May 13, quietly obeyed General de Gaulle's order, resigning from the "All-Algeria Committee of Public Safety", along with the other 11 officers who had formed the committee with right-wing civilians. Four other French Army generals (Maurice Challe, Edmond Jouhaud, André Zeller, and Raoul Salan) were angry at the order and would rebel against de Gaulle in 1961.
- The popular children's book character Paddington Bear was introduced with the publication by William Collins, Sons, of the book A Bear Called Paddington, written by Michael Bond, and illustrated by Peggy Fortnum.
- Harold H. Burton, an Associate Justice of the U.S. Supreme Court since being appointed by U.S. President Harry S. Truman in 1945, resigned from his seat "with regret but in accordance with competent medical advice and with a desire to serve the best interest of all concerned." Potter Stewart, a judge of the U.S. Sixth Circuit Court of Appeals in Cincinnati, Ohio, was nominated by President Eisenhower, subject to confirmation by the U.S. Senate, to replace Burton.
- Penny Coelen was crowned Miss World 1958 during the 8th Miss World Pageant, becoming the first South African to win the title.
- Born:
  - Jamal Khashoggi, Saudi Arabian journalist and dissident (murdered 2018)
  - Arne Sorenson, American businessman who was president and CEO of the Marriott hotel chain from 2012 until his death; to American parents in Tokyo, Japan (d. 2021 of pancreatic cancer)
- Died:
  - Waheed el Solh, 57, Lebanon's Minister of Planning, was assassinated by three men outside his office in Beirut.
  - Lorraine Geller, 30, American jazz pianist, died of heart failure
  - Alexander Veprik, 59, Soviet Jewish composer of classical music who spent four years in a Russian gulag after being convicted of "Jewish nationalism"

== October 14, 1958 (Tuesday) ==
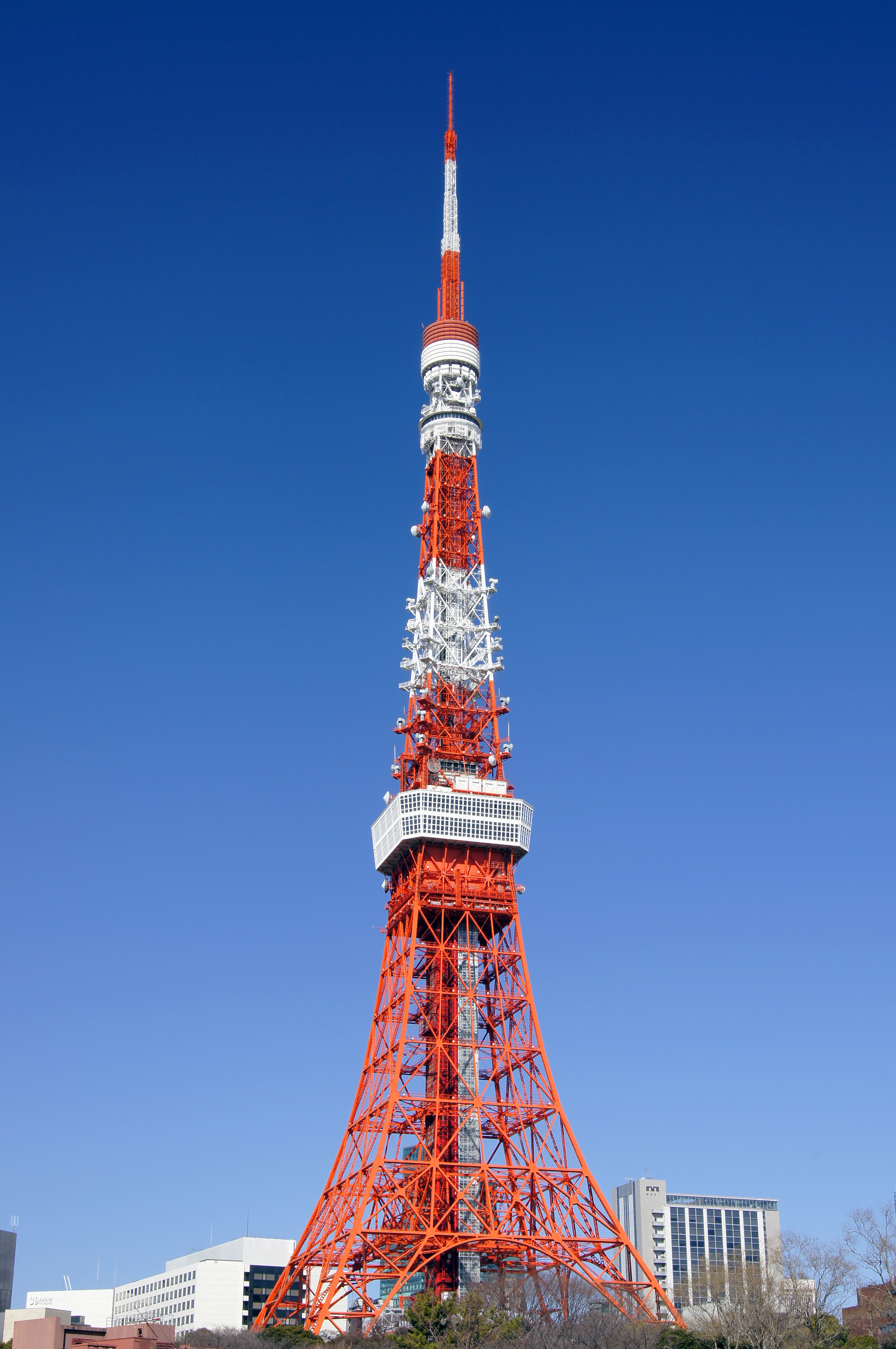
The Tokyo Tower

- Construction of the Tokyo Tower, at 1,092 feet (333 m) the tallest free-standing tower in the world at the time, was completed with the bolting into place of a 295-foot (90 m) broadcast antenna. The structure, to be dedicated on December 23, was designed to look like France's the Eiffel Tower, which it exceeded in height by 76 feet (23 m).
- On the island of Madagascar, the Malagasy Republic was proclaimed as the first autonomous state within the French Community under France's Fifth Republic constitution, and began the transition to full independence, which would be achieved on June 26, 1960. The Malagasy Republic was administered by President Philibert Tsiranana with oversight from a French High Commissioner. Two days after the republic was proclaimed, a constitutional assembly of 90 members was elected to draft the law for the Republic.
- Creation of the United Nations Special Fund (UNSF) was approved in the UN General Assembly by a vote of 77 to 0, with one abstention, for the purpose of assisting economic development in the world's poorer nations.
- Potter Stewart was sworn in as the 92nd Justice of the U.S. Supreme Court, effective immediately, after U.S. President Eisenhower nominated him the day before while the U.S. Senate was not in session. Under existing law, he could act temporarily until the Senate could vote on confirmation of a permanent appointment.
- The World of Suzie Wong, an adaptation by Paul Osborn of the 1957 bestselling Richard Mason novel, opened at the Broadhurst Theatre on Broadway with France Nuyen in the title role.
- Archbishop William O. Brady consecrated the Cathedral of Saint Paul in St. Paul, Minnesota, followed by a solemn high Mass.
- Born: Peter Kloeppel, German journalist and TV anchorman for RTL Television; in Frankfurt am Main, West Germany
- Died: Douglas Mawson, 76, English-born Australian explorer on two Antarctic expeditions in the early 20th century

== October 15, 1958 (Wednesday) ==
- In Yugoslavia, one researcher was fatally injured by radiation, and four others sustained serious injuries that had to be treated with bone marrow transplantation, when a research reactor at the Boris Kidric Nuclear Energy Institute in Vinča sustained a criticality accident with an uncontrolled nuclear chain reaction. Života Vranić died despite receiving treatment from Dr. Georges Mathé, while the others recovered.
- The North American X-15 rocket plane was rolled out from North American Aviation's factory in Los Angeles, with a goal of being able to reach outer space (defined as an altitude of 100 kilometers or 62 miles) and then landing on a runway for reuse. The initial version, scheduled to make its first test flight in February, was designed to make suborbital flights, with future versions capable of going into orbit.
- Born:
  - Chris Smith, South African-born English national cricket team batsman; in Durban
  - Hiromi Hara, Japanese footballer with 75 caps for the Japan national team; in Nasushiobara, Tochigi Prefecture
- Died:
  - Jack Norton (stage name for Mortimer J. Naughton), 76, American stage and film comedian, character actor known for his portrayal of drunk men, although he was a teetotaler in real life. Norton said after his retirement that he thoroughly disliked drinking the simulated alcohol used on stage, consisting of "ginger ale spiked with bicarbonate of soda".
  - John Hamilton, 71, American television actor known for portraying Daily Planet editor Perry White on Adventures of Superman from 1952 to 1958

== October 16, 1958 (Thursday) ==
- The long-running BBC Television children's programme Blue Peter was first broadcast. Intended as an after-school show for children who were 5 to 8 years old, the initial broadcast was presented by actor Christopher Trace and by the 1957 Miss Great Britain winner, Leila Williams. The show was broadcast for 15 minutes from 5:00 to 5:15 in the afternoon.
- The Soviet Union's Council of Ministers passed a resolution canceling the property tax exemptions that had existed for the nation's monasteries, initiating a new campaign against organized religion in the USSR.
- Three weeks into its third season, the TV game show Twenty-One, under investigation by a grand jury, was announced as canceled a few hours before the new episode was to be seen on NBC. A spokesman for Pharmaceuticals said, "Twenty-One was dropped because of a decline in ratings. We must admit that the investigation had something do with this decline," after the October 9 show had the lowest rating in its history.
- Born: Tim Robbins, American film actor known for Mystic River and The Shawshank Redemption; in West Covina, California
- Died: Walter Spence, 57, British Guiana-born Canadian swimmer and 1933 U.S. national champion, was killed when he slipped from a moving train while on his way home from work

== October 17, 1958 (Friday) ==
- All 80 persons aboard died in the crash of an Aeroflot Tupolev Tu-104 jet airliner that was bringing diplomats from the People's Republic of China, Czechoslovakia, East Germany, France, and Hungary from Beijing to Moscow. Because of bad weather, the crew of the chartered Aeroflot plane had diverted to an alternate landing site. The plane was at an altitude of 33,000 feet (10,000 m) when it ran into a powerful updraft that sent it upward and then threw it into a vertical dive. The impact was near the Apnerka railroad station west of Kanash in the Chuvash ASSR within the Russian SFSR.
- In Upper Volta, a French West African colony whose voters had approved joining the French Community, Moro Naba Kougri made an unsuccessful attempt to install a constitutional monarchy with himself as King. Mobri was the King of the Mossi people and had held the title of the Mogho Naba of Ouagadougou since 1957. Kougri, who had the support of the commander of the French Army in Upper Volta, gathered around 3,000 of his supporters around the assembly and attempted to influence the choice of the new president of the council of ministers. Maurice Yaméogo, the acting head of the government, responded quickly to stop the coup and would be chosen as the permanent successor of Ouezzin Coulibaly.
- On October 17 and 18, Langley Research Center personnel visited the Air Force Ballistic Missile Division, Inglewood, California, to open negotiations for procuring Atlas launch vehicles for the crewed satellite project.
- An Evening with Fred Astaire, the first television presentation to be recorded on color videotape (as opposed to film), was broadcast live on NBC in the United States as Astaire's first-ever appearance on live television. The one-hour show was critically acclaimed, with one commentator opining that "Mr. Astaire and his colleagues have set a new standard for musical TV. By this time Western Union should be limp from delivering congratulatory wires."
- Born: Alan Jackson, American country singer; in Newnan, Georgia
- Died:
  - Celso Costantini, 82, Chancellor of the Roman Catholic Church, died eight days after Pope Pius XII and eight days before he was to begin the selection of a new Pope.
  - Cora Hartshorn, 85, American pioneer in birth control
  - Paul Outerbridge, 62, controversial American photographer and artist
  - Charlie Townsend, 81, English national cricket team batsman in 199 first-class matches
  - Zheng Zhenduo, 59, Chinese novelist and journalist, killed in the Aeroflot crash in the Soviet Union

== October 18, 1958 (Saturday) ==
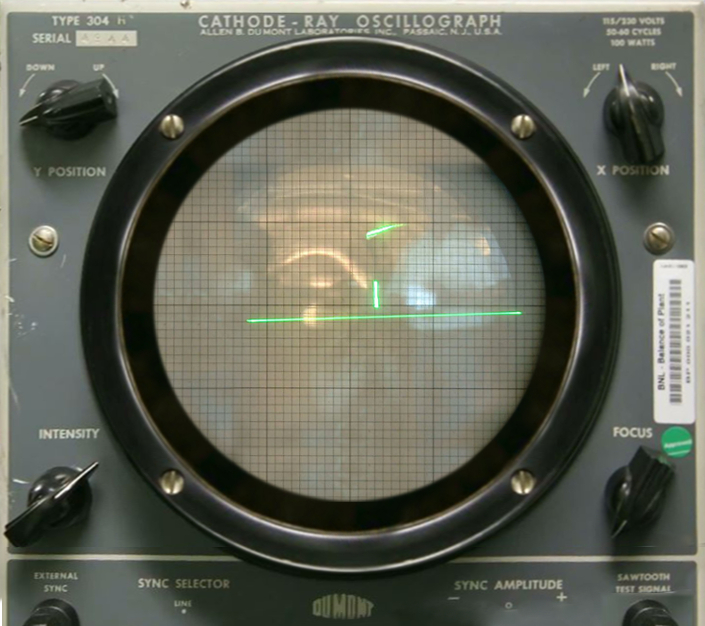
Tennis For Two on an oscilloscope

- Tennis for Two, a game invented by William Higinbotham and considered to be the first video computer game, visible on an oscilloscope and intended solely for entertainment rather than for instructional purposes, was introduced at the Brookhaven National Laboratory, at Brookhaven, New York in the United States, at the annual Visitors' Day Exhibit.
- Ahmadou Ahidjo, the prime minister of the French Cameroons, an overseas territory of France, signed an agreement with Bernard Cornut-Gentille, the Minister of the Overseas, pledging full independence for Cameroon by January 1, 1960.
- Julia Rajk, a participant in the 1956 Hungarian Revolution who had been imprisoned in the Soviet Union for two years, was released and allowed to return to Hungary, along with her 9-year-old son, László Rajk Jr., who had been allowed to stay with her. Their freedom came after publicity from the Robert Ardrey documentary Shadow of Heroes, which had premiered in London on October 7.
- Born: Thomas "The Hitman" Hearns, American professional boxer who was world welterweight champion (1980-1981), light middleweight champion (1982-1984), light heavyweight champion (1987-1988, 1991–1992) and cruiserweight champion (1994-2000); in Grand Junction, Tennessee
- Died: Max Gerlach, 73, German-born American millionaire who had been the inspiration for the character of "Jay Gatsby" in F. Scott Fitzgerald's novel The Great Gatsby

== October 19, 1958 (Sunday) ==
- Mike Hawthorn of Great Britain won the 1958 Formula One season, despite having finished first in only one of the 11 races on the schedule. Hawthorn finished a single point (42 to 41) ahead of fellow Briton Stirling Moss, who had won four races, including that day's Moroccan Grand Prix. Hawthorn won based on having finished first in one race and in second place in five others.
- Skeid Fotball, based in Oslo, defeated Lillestrøm SK, 1 to 0, to win the Norgesmesterskapet, the championship tournament of Norway's soccer football league, the Norges Fotballforbund (NFF).
- Born:
  - Michael Steele, conservative African-American politician, lieutenant governor of Maryland 2003-2007 and Chairman of the Republican National Committee 2009 to 2011; at Andrews Air Force Base hospital near Morningside, Maryland
  - Karen Agustiawan, Indonesian businesswoman and chief executive officer of the government-owned oil and gas company Pertamina from 2009 to 2014; as Galaila Karen Kardinah in Bandung, West Java
  - Hiromi Hara, Japanese soccer football forward with 75 appearances for the national team; in Nasushiobara, Tochigi Prefecture
- Died: Mary F. Hoyt, 100, the first female federal government employee in the U.S. civil service. In 1883, she was appointed as a clerk at the U.S. Treasury Department's Bank Redemption Agency.

== October 20, 1958 (Monday) ==
- Thai Army Field Marshal Sarit Thanarat led a bloodless coup d'état and overthrew the elected government of Prime Minister Thanom Kittikachorn. Thanarat had led a coup in September 1957 and had installed a civilian, Pote Sarasin, as premier. The next morning, all political parties were banned, 10 newspapers were closed, and arrests were made of editors, teachers, writers, students and businessmen suspected to be Communists or sympathizers.
- The Little Rock Private School Corporation, set up by white supporters of racial segregation after Arkansas Governor Orval E. Faubus had ordered the closing of Little Rock's four high schools on September 12, began classes for all 12th grade students at the Arkansas capital's three white high schools (Central High, R. C. Hall High, and Little Rock Tech). The private Little Rock High School, which enrolled 230 students, began classes at a former orphanage with capacity for 475 students. Other students began registration for a private high school, sponsored by several local Baptist churches and the Ouachita Baptist College, with 407 beginning classes at Little Rock Baptist High School. In addition, 45 other students started classes at Hazen High School in nearby Hazen, Arkansas, 42 miles (68 km) east of Little Rock. Classes were not available for African-American students, nor for children of any race from first grade to ninth grade.
- Born:
  - Viggo Mortensen, American film actor known for portraying Aragorn in the Lord of the Rings trilogy; in Watertown, New York
  - Mark King, English bass guitarist known for his slap style; in Cowes, Isle of Wight

== October 21, 1958 (Tuesday) ==
- With the opening of Parliament in the United Kingdom, women took their seats in the House of Lords for the first time as two ladies— Stella Isaacs, Baroness Swanborough and Barbara Wootton, Baroness Wootton of Abinger— were admitted as life peers in an elaborate ceremony. The next day, Baroness Elliot and Baroness Ravensdale were admitted to the Lords.
- The Boeing 707 made its first transatlantic flight, five days ahead of the official introduction of commercial service set for October 26. Carrying a load of 103 passengers, all of them news reporters, the Pan American World Airways jet departed New York on the evening of October 20 at 7:10, and landed in Paris at 10:23 the next morning, after stopping in the Azores for refueling.
- For the first time, the United States joined in voting in favor of a United Nations resolution condemning the South African policy of apartheid, after a longstanding policy of abstaining. The U.N. General Assembly Special Political Committee voted, 68 to 5, for the resolution, with four abstentions. The U.S. would join the full General Assembly in the condemnation in another vote on October 30.
- The Curtiss-Wright Corporation, manufacturer of aircraft, became the first company to purchase the technology for the Wankel engine, commonly called the "rotary engine", to use in a product as an alternative to the piston engine and the turbojet. The company agreed to pay $2.1 million and a 5% commission on all engines sold to become the sole license holder of the rotary engine technology in the United States.

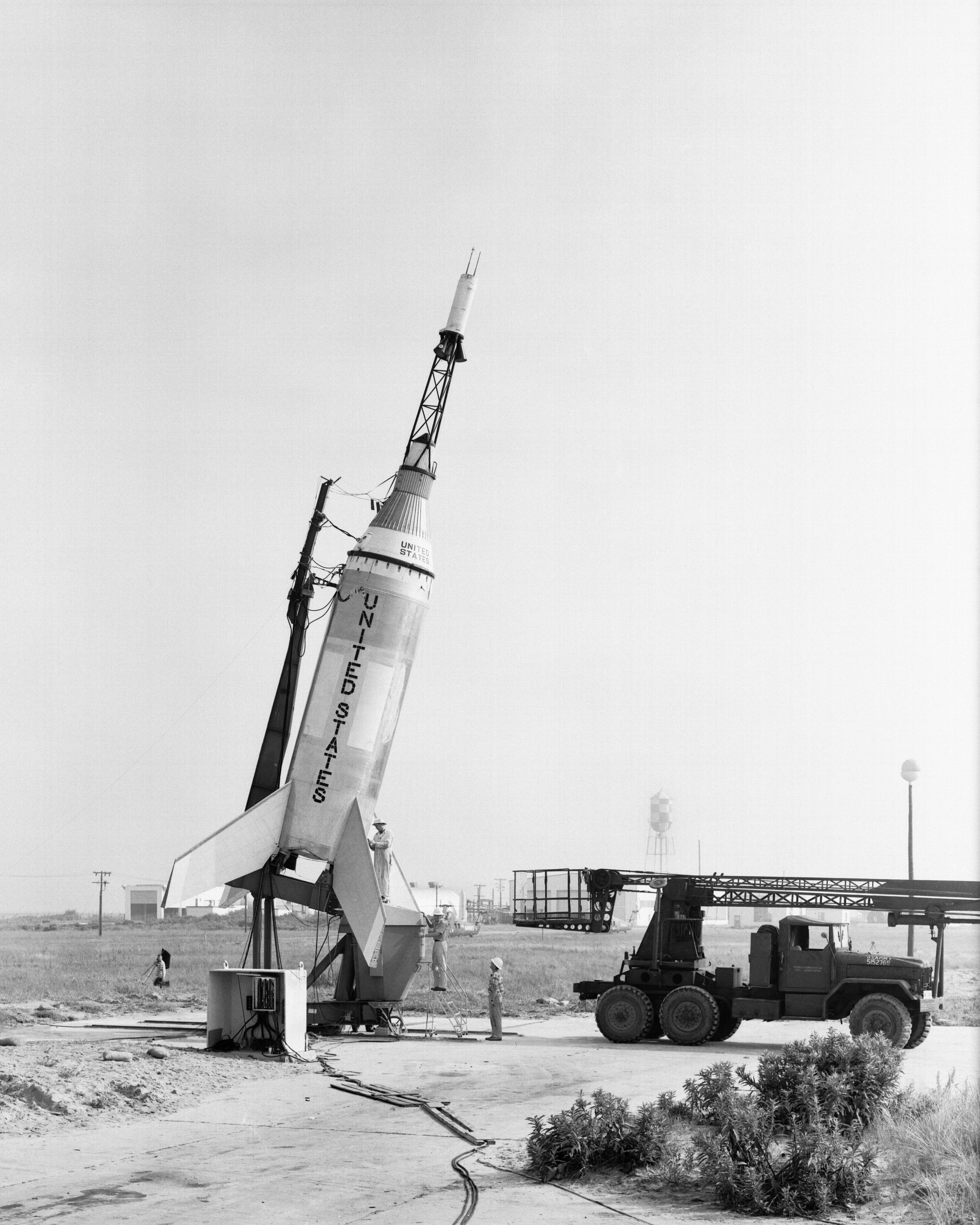
Little Joe rocket at Wallops Island in August 1959

- A bidders' briefing for the Little Joe launch vehicle was held. This launch vehicle was to be used in the development phase of the American crewed satellite project. The Little Joe launch vehicle was 48 feet (15 m) in height, weighed (at maximum) 41,330 pounds (18,750 kg), was 6.66 feet (2.03 m) in diameter, consisted of four Pollux and four Recruit clustered, solid-fuel rockets, could develop a thrust of 250,000 pounds (110,000 kg), and could lift a maximum payload of 3,942 pounds (1,788 kg).
- Born: Julio Medem, Spanish Basque film director; in San Sebastián, Gipuzkoa province

== October 22, 1958 (Wednesday) ==
- All 31 people aboard British European Airways Flight 142 were killed when the Vickers Viscount airliner collided with an Italian Air Force F-86E jet at an altitude of 23,500 feet (7,200 m) over an area near the Nettuno Air Base. An investigation determined that the airliner had strayed into restricted military airspace while approaching Naples at the end of a flight from London.
- After the school board of Norfolk, Virginia closed its public schools rather than carry out a federal court order to admit African-American students into all-White Norfolk schools, the "Tidewater Academy" was opened for 250 white students, with funding provided by the private Defenders of State Sovereignty and Individual Liberties organization, and classes meeting at local churches.

== October 23, 1958 (Thursday) ==
- The Australian resort town of South Coast, Queensland, which had been formed in 1949 by the merger of the towns of Coolangatta and Southport, renamed itself Gold Coast, Queensland, as part of a plan to convert the beach resort into a major tourist destination.
- Chiang Kai-shek, President of the Republic of China on the island of Taiwan, announced from Taipei in a joint statement with U.S. Secretary of State John Foster Dulles that, after discussion, he had abandoned plans previously announced to attempt to conquer the mainland of the People's Republic of China, and that Taiwan would gradually reduce its force of troops on the islands of Quemoy and Matsu, claimed by both Chinas.
- The Nobel Committee announced that Soviet Russian novelist Boris Pasternak was the winner of the 1958 Nobel Prize for Literature for his novel Doctor Zhivago. Pasternak would not be allowed to travel to Stockholm to accept the prize.
- Comic book writer and artist Pierre Culliford, who used the pen name "Peyo" to sign his comic strip "Johan and Peewit" in the weekly comic book magazine Le Journal de Spirou, introduced a blue-skinned character in white clothes, which he called a "Schtroumpf". In the course of the serialized story "La Flûte à six trous" ("The Flute with Six Holes"), Johan and Peewit found that a magic flute they were searching for was in the possession of a colony of Schtroumpfs. Adventures of the Schtroumpfs became more popular than the Johan and Peewit series and they soon received their own series in 1959, along with promotions for merchandising of Schtroumpfs. In the Flemish and Dutch language translation of the comics, "Les Schtroumpfs" were dubbed "De Smurfen" and, in 1973, would be introduced as "The Smurfs", now a worldwide franchise.
- A vast rockfall in an underground coal mine killed 75 miners near Springhill, Nova Scotia, at the Springhill Colliery mine that had suffered deadly disasters in 1891 and in 1956. The event was a "bump", the collapse of support pillars resulting in a seismic wave that can spread throughout the rest of the mine. The Canadian Broadcasting Corporation carried continuous live news coverage of the disaster, originating the suspension of regular programming after an interruption for "breaking news".
- Born: Michael Eric Dyson, American academic author and biographer; in Detroit

== October 24, 1958 (Friday) ==
- The 52 members of the Roman Catholic Church's College of Cardinals, having come to Italy from 20 nations, entered the Sistine Chapel for the first papal election in more than 19 years, to stay inside behind closed doors until a new pontiff could be selected.. For the first time, cardinals from African nations, as well as from China, Australia and India, were present, along with those from the Latin American nations of Chile, Colombia, Cuba and Ecuador.
- Died: G. E. Moore, 84, English philosopher

== October 25, 1958 (Saturday) ==
- The last United States troops departed Lebanon 102 days after "Operation Blue Bat" had started on July 15 to support the existing Lebanese government during an ongoing civil war. At the height of the crisis, there were 14,179 American troops— 8,509 U.S. Army personnel and 5,670 members of the U.S. Marines— stationed in Lebanon.
- Born: Kornelia Ender, East German swimmer who won four gold medals in the 1976 Summer Olympics and held the women's 100m butterfly and 200m individual medley world records twice between 1973 and 1977, and then quit because she refused to take steroids; in Plauen, East Germany
- Died: Edward Aloysius Mooney, 76, American Catholic Cardinal and Archbishop of Detroit, died suddenly while in the Sistine Chapel, waiting to participate in the first voting for the new Pope.

== October 26, 1958 (Sunday) ==
- The first round of balloting took place in the voting by the College of Cardinals for a new Pope, with no candidate receiving the required two-thirds plus one of the votes— 35 — of the 51 cardinals present. At 11:53 in the morning, the first signal of a result was given, with white smoke— the signal that a new Pope had been selected— coming from a chimney at first before turning dark black, the signal that nobody had received the required majority. Four candidates were believed to be the front runners, Angelo Giuseppe Roncalli, the Patriarch of Venice; Valerio Valeri, Prefect of the Sacred Congregation of the Religious; Benedetto Aloisi Masella, the Camerlengo of the Church. All three were from Italy, while a fourth, Gregorio Pietro Agagianian, Patriarch of the Armenians, was considered less likely.
- Regular service of the new Boeing 707 jet from the U.S. to Europe began as the four engine aircraft took off from New York International Airport in Idlewild, Queens, at 7:20 in the evening with 111 passengers and 12 crew on a flight to Le Bourget Airport in Paris.
- The wreckage of the Australian National Airways airliner Southern Cloud, an Avro 618 Ten which had disappeared on March 12, 1931 while on a flight from Sydney to Melbourne, was found by Tom Sonter, a hydroelectric company employee, in the Snowy Mountains in the state of New South Wales. The remains of the six passengers and two crew aboard were found inside the aircraft, 27 years after it had vanished.
- Born: Pascale Ogier (stage name for Pascale Marguerite Nicolas), French film actress; in Paris (d. of heart attack, 1984)
- Died:
  - José Gustavo Guerrero, 82, El Salvador jurist who was the last president of the Permanent Court of International Justice of the League of Nations from 1937 to 1946, and the first president of the International Court of Justice of the United States from 1946 to 1949, continuing as one of the 15 World Court judges until his death.
  - Sid Simpson, 64, U.S. Representative for Illinois, collapsed and died after having delivered the principal address in the dedication of a new wing of the local hospital in Pittsfield, Illinois. Simpson, a Republican Congressman since 1943, died in the hospital's emergency room nine days before the November 4 election for a ninth term.

== October 27, 1958 (Monday) ==
- Twenty days after he had dismissed the civilian government, suspended the constitution and instituted military rule in Pakistan, President Iskander Mirza abruptly resigned under pressure and turned the presidency over the man whom he had just appointed as Prime Minister, General Muhammad Ayub Khan. Mirza said in a statement, "In our efforts to evolve an effective structure for future administration of this country and based on our experience of the last three weeks, I have come to the conclusion that any semblance of dual control is likely to hamper effective performance of this immense task," and "An unfortunate impression exists... that General Ayub and I may not always act in unison. Such an impression... if allowed to continue, would be damaging to our cause. I have therefore decided to step aside and hand all powers to General Ayub Khan. I wish General Ayub Khan and his colleagues the best of luck. Long live Pakistan!" General Ayub told reporters three days later that he had dismissed President Mirza after making arrangements for Mirza to draw his retirement pension in foreign currency. "Certain things did come to my knowledge that I wouldn't talk about," he said. "We must have a man at the helm that people have complete faith in. Anyhow, there should be no doubts about his past," adding "I felt it my duty— my very reluctant duty because he is an old friend of mine and he has some very wonderful qualities— to tell him what the people are feeling." At 10:00 in the evening, Ayub sent three Army generals to tell Mirza to resign or to forfeit his pension.
- The first scheduled Boeing 707 flight landed in Paris at 10:01 local time after departing the night before from New York City. The Pan American World Airways airplane than made a westward flight back to New York that departed Paris at 6:52 in the evening local time and arrived back in New York 10 hours and 13 minutes later, including a three-hour refueling stop.
- The date of October 1, 1960, was agreed upon for independence from the United Kingdom for Nigeria, at a constitutional conference convened in London under the chairmanship of Alan Lennox-Boyd, Britain's Secretary of State for the Colonies. Lennox-Boyd conferred with the regional chief ministers of Nigeria's three subdivisions, the Northern, Southern and Western Regions, who agreed to a timetable for self-government on domestic affairs to start on April 15, 1969, and postponing the Nigerians' original demand for April 2, 1960 as the independence day.
- A special Committee on Life Sciences was established at Langley to determine qualifications and attributes required of personnel to be selected for America's first human spaceflight and to give advice on other human aspects of the crewed satellite program.
- An explosion killed 22 coal miners at the Pocahontas Fuel Company's underground mine at Bishop, West Virginia, located near the border of the U.S. states of West Virginia and Virginia. Out of 188 miners, 166 were able to make it to safety. The disaster occurred during a change of shifts at the mines, killing eight miners who were preparing to leave and 14 who had just arrived. An accident at the same mine 18 months earlier had killed 37 employees.
- Born: Simon Le Bon, British musician and lead singer for Duran Duran; in Bushey, Hertfordshire

== October 28, 1958 (Tuesday) ==
- On the third day of balloting in the College of Cardinals of the Roman Catholic Church, and after 10 rounds of voting had taken place without the required majority of two-thirds plus one, Angelo Giuseppe Roncalli, the Patriarch of Venice, was elected as the successor to Pope Pius XII. Roncalli received at least 35 votes on the third vote taken that day and, when Cardinal Eugène Tisserant, Dean of the College of Cardinals asked Roncalli whether he would agree to the offer of the papacy, Roncalli became Pope John XXIII shortly before 5:00 in the afternoon when he uttered the single word "Accepto". His coronation was scheduled for November 9. As the 262nd Supreme Pontiff, he was the first to take the name John since the year 1334, when Pope John XXII last reigned. Baldassarre Cossa, an "antipope" not recognized by the Catholic Church as a rightful heir to Saint Peter, had used the name John XXIII from 1410 to 1415 during a schism within the Church.
- The monopoly of the Radio Corporation of America (RCA) on the manufacture of color television sets came to an end as the RCA company agreed to a consent judgment and a $100,000 fine to settle antitrust criminal charges brought on February 1 by the U.S. Department of Justice. As one observer noted, "The effort to sell color television to the public has thus far been largely an R.C.A. and N.B.C. show," noting RCA made the only commercial color sets, and that its subsidiary, the National Broadcasting Company (NBC) carried the only television programs broadcast in color.
- The Royal Swedish Academy of Science announced that the Nobel Prize for Physics would be awarded to three Soviet physicists, Pavel Cherenkov, Ilya Frank and Igor Tamm for their discovery of the antiproton and for spurring the study of cosmic radiation, while the Nobel Prize for Chemistry was announced for Britain's Frederick Sanger of Cambridge University for developing a method for studying the structure of proteins and isolating and identifying the molecular components of insulin.
- The second coal mine disaster in two days in the U.S. state of West Virginia killed 13 miners at the Oglebay-Norton Company mine near Summersville, West Virginia.
- The co-pilot and the engineer of a Panagra airlines DC-7 averted disaster to the 45 people on board by making a steep dive to avoid a collision with three U.S. Air Force planes at an altitude of 18,000 feet (5,500 m). The Panagra flight was traveling from New York to Miami, with a final scheduled destination of Lima, Peru, and was over Wilmington, North Carolina when the engineer spotted a refueling tanker and two USAF jets flying towards the plane. The pilot was talking to passengers in the cabin at the time. According to the engineer, "The tanker cleared us over our left wing."
- Born: Raúl Pellegrin, Chilean anti-government guerrilla leader (murdered 1988)

== October 29, 1958 (Wednesday) ==
- Soviet Russian author Boris Pasternak, vilified at home for his book Dr. Zhivago, became the first person to reject the Nobel Prize. He sent a cable to the Swedish Academy saying that he was "immensely thankful, touched, proud, astonished and abashed", but that he was making a "voluntary refusal" of the Nobel Prize for Literature.
- Officials of the United States Department of the Post Office ordered all U.S. postal stations to halt delivery of the November 1958 issue of the magazine Playboy, pending a hearing on whether the contents qualified as obscene. The following morning, the Judge David A. Pine of the United States District Court for the District of Columbia issued a five-day temporary restraining order barring postal officials from halting delivery and directing them to send copies in the same manner as other magazines. Two judges of the D.C. circuit's U.S. Court of Appeals rejected an appeal of Judge Pine's order the same day, and Post Office Department concluded that the matter would be a moot point, since almost all of the issues would reach subscribers within five days.
- Born: Stefan Dennis, Australian television actor known for his recurring role as Paul Robinson in the soap opera Neighbours; in Tawonga, Victoria
- Died: Zoe Akins, 71, American playwright and Pulitzer Prize winner

== October 30, 1958 (Thursday) ==
- For the first time, white tigers were born in captivity, after five years of breeding attempts. The births of the four cubs (one male and three females) took place at the private zoo of conservationist Martand Singh, the Maharaja of Rewa, in Govindgarh in the Madhya Pradesh state.
- The Swedish Academy announced that the Nobel Prize in Physiology or Medicine would go to George Beadle and Edward Tatum for their discovery that genes transmit hereditary characteristics by controlling chemical reactions, and to 33-year-old Dr. Joshua Lederberg of the University of Wisconsin for his discovery of the recombination and organization of the genetic material of bacteria.
- The explosion of a car bomb on a crowded street killed nine people in the Algerian city of Tiaret, and injured 26 others, 12 of them critically. Two 105 mm artillery shells had been hidden by terrorists inside a sedan parked along the main street. Six Muslim Algerians, 3 of them children, were killed along with three French Algerians.
- The basis for the medical procedure of coronary angiography was accidentally discovered by Dr. F. Mason Sones, a cardiologist at the Cleveland Clinic, when a 26-year-old patient accidentally received an amount of contrast dye in the patient's right coronary artery rather than in the intended target for catheterization, the aorta. Rather than going into fibrillation, the patient's heart restarted and Sones realized that small amounts of contrast dye could be injected into a coronary artery, which would permit accurate observation of arterial blockages.
- The United States carried out four nuclear tests on the final day before a moratorium was to begin at midnight Universal Time (4:00 in the afternoon at the Nevada test site). Because of the October 31 scheduled halt to testing of hydrogen and atomic bombs, the U.S., the United Kingdom and the USSR had all raced to perform as many detonations as possible during October, with 29 by the U.S. alone during the month of October. The final American test, code-named Titania, took place at 20:34:00.2 UTC (12:34 local time). The Soviet Union joined the moratorium after making its last test on November 3.
- Born: Joe Delaney, American football running back; in Henderson, Texas (drowned 1983)
- Died: Philip Scrutton, 35, British golfer and winner of the Walker Cup (1955 and 1957), and John Pritchett, 27, 1948 Boys Amateur Championship winner, were killed when Scrutton's car was hit by a British Army truck.

== October 31, 1958 (Friday) ==
- A moratorium on nuclear weapons testing by the three nuclear powers at the time— the United States, the United Kingdom and the Soviet Union— went into effect as the U.S. and the UK suspended their testing and the Soviets said at the nuclear weapons talks in Geneva that they would soon join. The Soviet Union, which had resumed testing in September after a voluntary hold on March 31, waited until November 3 to announce that it would join the moratorium.
- The Union of Soviet Writers expelled Boris Pasternak after a meeting and a closed-door hearing by the Union's leader, in which the author of Doctor Zhivago was denounced as "a Fascist fifth columnist". The expulsion effectively barred Pasternak from being published in the Soviet Union, where membership in the Communist Party-sponsored Union was a requirement for publication.
- The Lisbon Agreement for the Protection of Appellations of Origin and their International Registration was signed in the capital of Portugal to amend the 1883 Paris Convention for the Protection of Industrial Property and to establish the International Register of Appellations of Origin, but would be ratified by only nine nations in the first 10 years. It would go into effect on September 25, 1966.

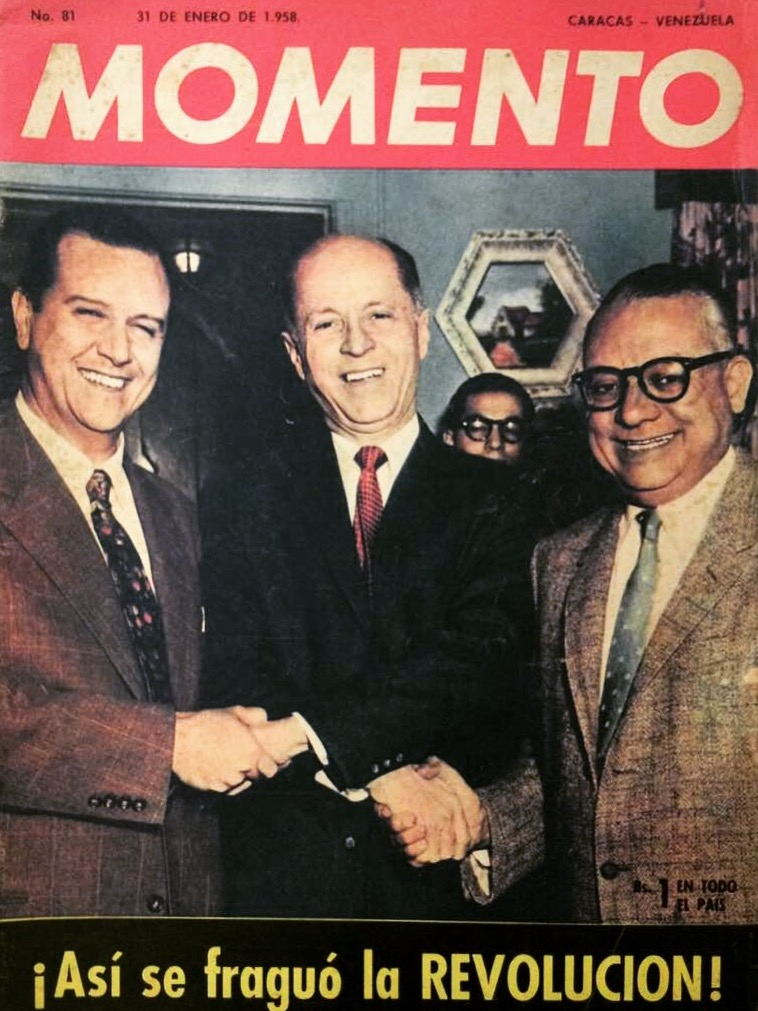
The three rival Venezuelan leaders, Rafael Caldera, Jóvito Villalba, and Rómulo Betancourt

- The representatives of Venezuela's three major political parties— Acción Democrática (AD), COPEI (Social Christian Party), and Unión Republicana Democrática (URD)— signed the Puntofijo Pact, agreeing to respect the results of the presidential and legislative elections scheduled for December 7.
- Edwin M. Turner and William P. Turner filed the patent application for their invention, the scimitar antenna, designed for use on U.S. aircraft and space vehicles. U.S. Patent No. 3,015,101 would be granted on December 26, 1961.
- Born:
  - Jeannie Longo, French women's road racing cyclist, 1996 Olympic gold medalist, 5-time UCI road world champion (1985-1987, 1989, 1995); in Annecy, Haute-Savoie département
  - Simon Poidevin, Australian national rugby union team flanker with 59 appearances for Australia in international competition; in Goulburn, New South Wales
- Died: Tom Pittman (stage name for Jerry Lee Alten), 26, American TV and film actor, was killed in an automobile accident after departing a Halloween party in his Porsche 550 Spyder. Pittman crashed through a guard rail and plunged into a 150-foot (46 m) deep ravine. His body would not be discovered until November 19.
