= Instruments used in cardiology =

Instruments used in cardiology encompass a wide array of tools and devices employed for the diagnosis, monitoring, and treatment of diseases of the heart and blood vessels. Cardiology instruments range from classic diagnostic tools like the stethoscope and sphygmomanometer to advanced electronic devices such as electrocardiograph machines and cardiac imaging systems, as well as therapeutic implants (e.g. pacemakers and defibrillators) and surgical equipment (e.g. the heart–lung machine).

== History ==
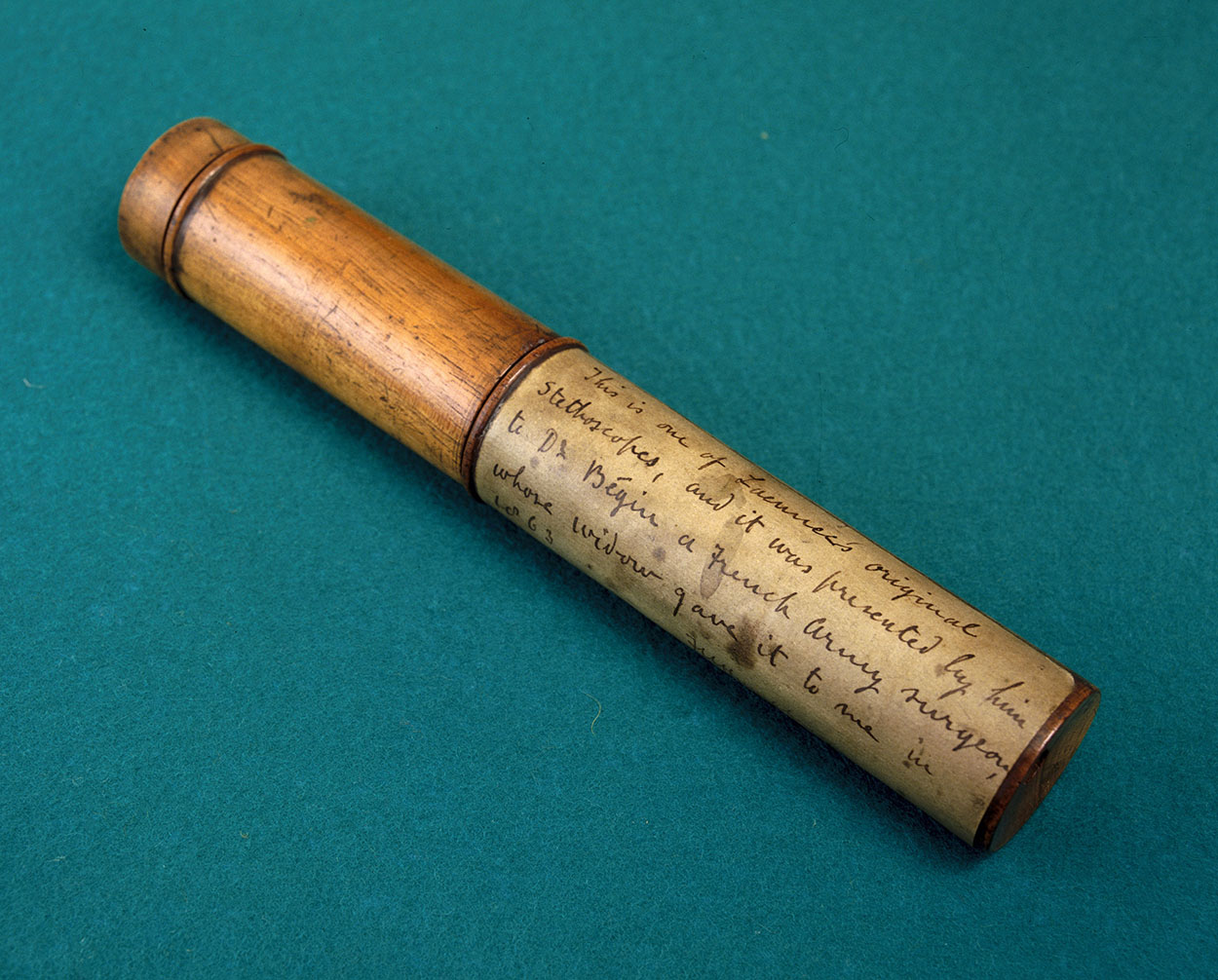
The original stethoscope belonged to René-Théophile-Hyacinthe Laennec.

Efforts to observe and treat the heart have a long history, but the development of specialized cardiology instruments accelerated in the 19th and 20th centuries. In 1816, French physician René Laennec invented the stethoscope, allowing doctors to auscultate heart sounds non-invasively for the first time. Later in the 19th century, blood pressure measurement became possible when Italian internist Scipione Riva-Rocci introduced the mercury sphygmomanometer in 1896.

In 1895 Wilhelm Röntgen discovered X-rays, enabling the first chest radiographs to visualize cardiac silhouettes.

The Dutch physiologist Willem Einthoven developed the string galvanometer electrocardiograph in the early 20th century, and by 1902, the first practical electrocardiogram was recorded. Electrocardiography provided objective information about the heart's electrical activity and quickly became an essential diagnostic tool.

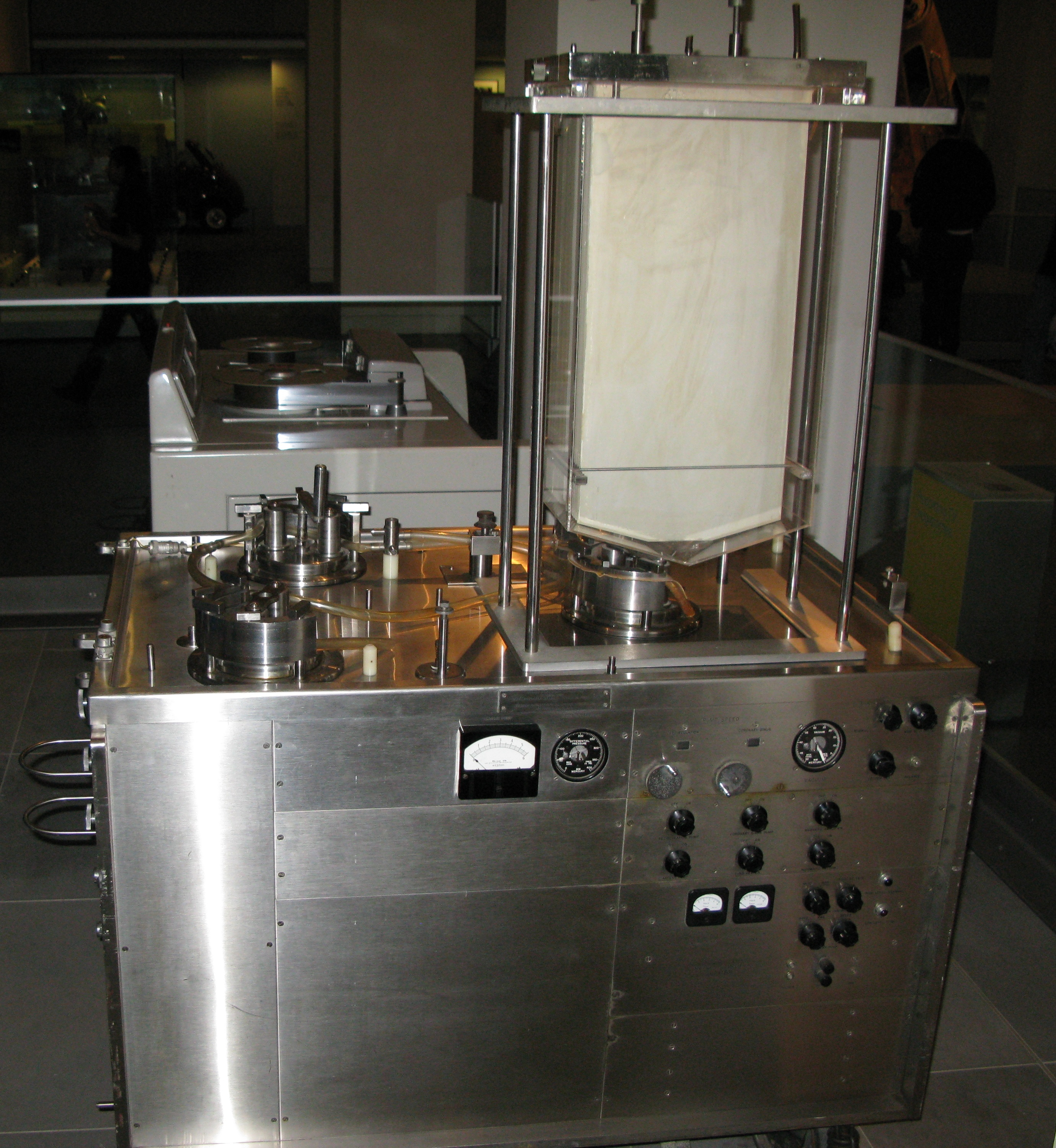
1955 heart lung machine

In 1929, German physician Werner Forssmann performed the first human cardiac catheterization by threading a catheter into his own heart, demonstrating the potential of invasive diagnostics inside the heart's chambers. This experiment laid the groundwork for cardiac catheterization techniques. By the 1940s, physicians André Cournand and Dickinson W. Richards had refined cardiac catheterization for clinical diagnosis and earned a Nobel Prize in 1956.

In 1953, the first successful use of a heart–lung machine by American surgeon John Heysham Gibbon made open-heart surgery possible. Gibbon's device, known as the cardiopulmonary bypass machine, could temporarily take over the function of the heart and lungs during surgery, allowing surgeons to repair intracardiac defects under direct vision.

In 1947, Claude Beck performed the first successful defibrillation of a human heart during an open-chest surgery, using electric shock to reverse ventricular fibrillation. By 1957, Paul M. Zoll and colleagues had demonstrated closed-chest defibrillation with external paddles.

Canadian electrical engineer John Hopps developed the first external cardiac pacemakers in the early 1950s. The progression to fully implantable pacemakers came in 1958, when Swedish surgeon Åke Senning and engineer Rune Elmqvist implanted the first internal pacemaker in a patient. By the 1960s, cardiac defibrillation technology had advanced: Dr. Bernard Lown introduced the direct current defibrillator in 1962.

The 1960s also saw Dr. Mason Sones develop selective coronary angiography in 1962, providing a crucial diagnostic tool for coronary artery disease. Cardiac imaging capabilities expanded further with the first echocardiograms in the 1950s and 1960s, by Inge Edler and Carl Hellmuth Hertz, and later the introduction of cardiac nuclear imaging and cardiac CT scanning in the 1970s -1980s.

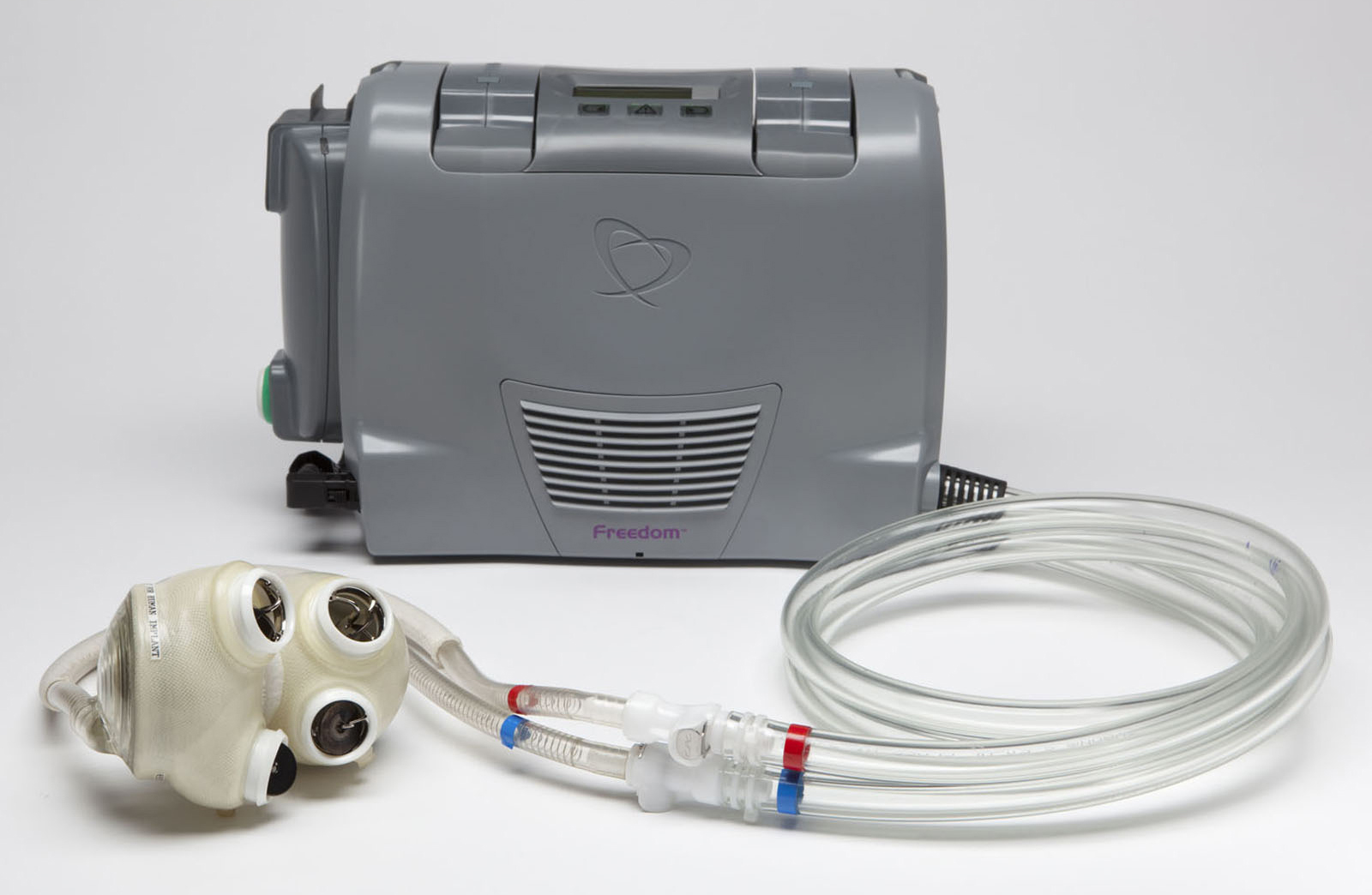
SynCardia Total Artificial Heart with Freedom Driver. 2011

In 1977, Andreas Grüntzig performed the first percutaneous transluminal coronary angioplasty to dilate a blocked coronary artery using a balloon catheter. In 1986, Jacques Puel and Ulrich Sigwart implanted the first coronary stents in human patients to scaffold arteries open after angioplasty. Implantable cardioverter defibrillators were another major innovation - first conceived by Michel Mirowski, the ICD was successfully implanted in a patient in 1980 and approved in 1985, providing automatic internal shock therapy for life-threatening arrhythmias.

By the end of the 20th century, a wide range of cardiology instruments and devices were in use: from advanced imaging modalities like cardiac MRI to ventricular assist devices and artificial heart implants for advanced heart failure and the first permanent total artificial heart was implanted in 1982.

== Instruments used in cardiology ==
| Instrument | Uses |
|---|---|
| Defibrillator | used to correct abnormal electrical activity of the heart like when terminating a fibrillation |
| Vascular stents | used to mechanically open up a coronary artery occlusion, generally due to atherosclerosis |
| Pacemaker | used to correct the hearts rate and rhythm |

== See also ==
- Cardiology – general overview of the field
- Cardiac surgery – surgical specialty on heart operations
- Interventional cardiology – subspecialty focused on catheter-based treatments
- Medical device – discussion of device types and regulations
- Electrophysiology – study and treatment of heart rhythm disorders
