= Rif Conflict =

The Rif Conflict may refer to:

- First Melillan campaign (1893–94)
- Second Melillan campaign (1909)
- Kert campaign (1911–12)
- Rif War (1921–26)
- Rif Revolt (1958–59)
- Rif Movement (2016–17)
