= Straton tube =

The Straton tube, by Siemens Healthineers (formerly Siemens Medical Solutions), Erlangen, Germany, is the first X-ray tube from the class of rotating envelope tubes (RET) to be used for computed tomography.

With rotating envelope tubes, the entire vacuum tube rotates with respect to the anode axis, versus rotating anode tubes, in which the target disk rotates inside a stationary vacuum tube. The target cools by conduction rather than radiation. Heat storage is less important, and waiting times are eliminated.
