= Siemens Healthineers =

German healthcare service provider

Siemens Healthineers AG
- Type: Public (Aktiengesellschaft)
- Traded as: FWB: SHL; DAX component
- ISIN: DE000SHL1006
- Industry: Healthcare
- Founded: 1 December 2017; 8 years ago in Munich, Germany
- Headquarters: Erlangen, Germany
- Area served: Worldwide
- Key people: Bernd Montag (CEO); Jochen Schmitz (CFO)
- Products: Angiography and interventional X-ray systems; Computed tomography; Radiation oncology; Laboratory diagnostics; Molecular diagnostics; Molecular imaging; Magnetic resonance imaging; Point-of-care diagnostics; Refurbished systems; Syngo imaging software; Ultrasound; X-ray
- Revenue: ▲€21.7 billion (2022)
- Operating income: ▲€2.927 billion (2022)
- Net income: ▲€2.054 billion (2022)
- Total assets: ▲€33.614 billion (2022)
- Total equity: ▲€19.852 billion (2022)
- Owner: Siemens AG (67%)
- Number of employees: 69,500 (2022)
- Website: www.siemens-healthineers.com

Siemens Healthineers is a German multinational company with specializing in medical technology and medical imaging. It was spun off from its parent company Siemens in 2017, which retains a 67% stake. Siemens Healthineers is the parent company for several medical technology companies and is headquartered in Erlangen, Germany.

== History ==
=== 19th century ===
The history of Siemens Healthineers started in Berlin in the mid-19th century as a part of what is now known as Siemens AG. Siemens & Halske was founded by Werner von Siemens and Johann Georg Halske on 12 October 1847. The company formed around an invention created by Siemens called the pointer telegraph. Based on the telegraph, Werner von Siemens' new invention used a needle to point to the sequence of letters, instead of using Morse code. The company, then called Telegraphen-Bauanstalt von Siemens & Halske, opened its first workshop on 12 October. Eventually, the new company included electrometrical equipment and specialized in medical technology.

In 1896, only one year after Wilhelm Conrad Röntgen discovered the X-ray, Siemens produced the first industrially manufactured X-ray tubes for medical diagnostics.

=== 20th century ===
In Aschaffenburg, Germany, X-ray pioneer Friedrich Dessauer founded his own company, which later came to prominence under the name Veifa-Werke. The companies maintained close ties with each other, finally merging in 1932 to form Siemens-Reiniger-Werke (SRW). Later, in 1933, Siemens introduced rotating anode tubes for X-rays that could withstand much greater electrical loads, laying the foundation for the development of modern X-ray tubes.

Supported by Siemens in Erlangen, Inge Edler, a Swedish physician, and physicist Carl Hellmuth Hertz were intrigued by the idea of using ultrasound technology to achieve more precise heart diagnoses. In 1953, they became the first to use the ultrasound technique for echocardiography.

In 1958, Elema-Schönander AB (subsequently Siemens-Elema AB) developed the first cardiac pacemaker implanted in a critically ill heart patient by surgeon Åke Senning.

In the 1960s, Siemens engineer Ralph Soldner developed the world's first "real-time" ultrasound unit, the Vidoson. With this technology, technicians could view movements inside the body on a screen as they were taking place.

In 1974, The company exhibited its first tomographic image of a human head at an annual meeting of the Radiological Society of North America, in Chicago. One year later, the company released its first computed tomography scanner, the Siretom.

In 1998, Siemens introduced the first track-based laboratory automation system, the ADVIA LabCell Automation Solution.

=== 21st century ===
The name Siemens Medical Solutions was adopted in 2001, and the change to Siemens Healthcare was made in 2008. In 2015, Siemens named Bernd Montag as its new global CEO. In May 2016, the business operations of Siemens Healthcare were rebranded "Siemens Healthineers."

Siemens was the first to combine positron emission tomography (PET) with computed tomography (CT). By creating this hybrid imaging system, Siemens combined the PET scanner's ability to visualize biological processes of life with a CT system's anatomical image of tissues and organs. In doing so, the combination system allows a simultaneous display of anatomy and biological function. Time magazine named the Siemens Biograph, the world's first commercial PET-CT scanner, the "Innovation of the Year" in 2000.

In a similar fashion, Siemens launched the Biograph mMR in 2010, the first scanner to completely combine MRI and PET technologies. Like PET-CT, PET-MR hybrid systems combine multiple technologies to provide a better image of the body, enabling better diagnoses, research, and treatment plans for patients. It combines precise images of body tissues from MRI with metabolic cell activity from PET.

In 2011, Siemens discontinued its linear accelerators for the treatment of cancer, citing cost pressures and a decision to focus on diagnostic imaging in cancer.

In May 2016, Siemens AG rebranded its Siemens Healthcare division to Siemens Healthineers as a part of its new management strategy. CEO Bernd Montag introduced the name along with a five-minute celebratory dance routine performed outside the division's headquarters in Erlangen. The routine was met with ridicule; the Financial Times called it a "writhing, spandex-clad horror." Multiple outlets called the new logo similar to that of Fitbit and called the rebranding a failure at large. The name also led some people to believe that it was an article from The Onion. Montag later admitted that the dance routine was a mistake.

In November 2017 the company announced its intention to become publicly listed on the Frankfurt Stock Exchange in March 2018. A minority stake of up to 25% was expected to be sold at part of the IPO, which would be Germany's largest listing since the IPO of Deutsche Telekom in 1996. The first day of trading was 16 March 2018, with a 15% stake sold at an initial share price of €28.00.

In 2022 Siemens Healthineers has drawn criticism for its decision to continue operating in Russia despite the country's invasion of Ukraine, which has led to widespread civilian casualties and international condemnation. Unlike its parent company, Siemens AG, which announced its withdrawal from the Russian market in response to the invasion, Siemens Healthineers has stated it will maintain its presence, citing its commitment to providing healthcare products and services. This stance has been perceived by some as undermining global efforts to isolate Russia economically and diplomatically, particularly as international sanctions aim to pressure the country to cease its aggression against Ukraine.
