= Moroccan Intifada of 1984 =

Protest movements 1984 in a group of Moroccan cities

- Date: January 19, 1984 – January 20, 1984
- Location: Morocco
- Caused by: Increase in food prices; Government rises student fees; IMF loan policy set in place
- Goals: Reforms; Fresh general elections
- Methods: Demonstrations, Riots, Strikes
- Result: Protests suppressed by force

The 1984 uprising in Morocco, also known as the Bread Uprising, the Hunger Uprising or the Students' Uprising, was a group of protest movements that broke out on January 19, 1984 in a number of Moroccan cities, reaching its climax in the northern cities of Al Hoceima, Nador, Tetouan, Ksar el-Kebir, as well as Marrakesh. Initially, the movement was composed of student demonstrations, but other social strata began to join them during a worsening economic context marked by the beginning of Morocco's implementation of the tedious structural adjustment policy, at the time, by the International Monetary Fund, whose repercussions were the high cost of living and the application of additional fees for education. The protests were met with police repression and widespread arrests, with 200 being killed in the uprising. Social protests had occurred throughout 1982-1983 while mass protests and labor strikes occurred weeks before the national rebellion.

== See also ==
- 1965 Moroccan riots
- 1981 Moroccan riots
- 1988 October Riots in Algeria
- 2011-2012 Moroccan protests
- Hirak Rif Movement
