= 1958 Rif riots =

Failed revolt in Morocco

Rif Revolt
Date	October 1958 – early 1959
Location	Rif region, northern Morocco
Result	Uprising quelled by state forces; Continued marginalization and disenfranchisement of the Rif region

Belligerents
Kingdom of Morocco supported by: France	Riffian insurgents

Commanders and leaders
Mohammed V Prince Hassan; Mohamed Oufkir	Sellam Amezian

Strength
20,000–30,000	Unknown

Casualties and losses
~1,000 killed	2,000–8,000 estimated killed 8,420 captured

The 1958 Rif riots, Rif Revolt or Rif uprising (Note: Arabic: انتفاضة الريف, romanized: Intifāḍat al-Rīf; In Tarifit, it is known by multiple names like Assouggas n'Ouedhra (lit. 'year of the mountain'), Aseggʷas iqebbaren (lit. 'year of the helmets') and Aseggʷas n tfaḍist (lit. 'year of the lentisks').) took place in the northern Rif region of Morocco by tribes rebelling against the Moroccan government, motivated by the region's marginalization. The revolt, led by Sellam Amezian, had a clear set of demands: political and social rights, the departure of foreign troops from the country, the return of the resistance leader Abd el-Krim from exile, the dissolution of political parties, the liberation of political prisoners, and the installation of a "people's government" (gouvernement populaire). Despite their anti-government and anti-Istiqlal agenda, the protestors were still monarchists.

Prince Hassan, who was then the military chief of staff, promulgated a decree that put the Rif region in a state of emergency and led an army of 20,000–30,000 soldiers to contain the uprising. The soldiers were aided with air support from French pilots. Estimates around 2,000–8,000 inhabitants of the region were killed and thousands more injured. According to El-Khattabi, 8,420 were taken as political prisoners.

== Context ==
The Rif was at that time the stronghold of the Moroccan National Liberation Army (ALN). This liberation army was founded on 2 October 1955 under the impetus of Abdelkrim El Khattabi, who at the time had called on several Berber warlords from the Atlas and the Rif to work together.

This movement was very active in the Rif in 1955, with skirmishes against French positions. The ALN supporters were in favour of armed struggle while the Istiqlal Party supporters were negotiating independence with France and Spain. This was finally obtained in 1956 and it was the Istiqlal that took power in Morocco.

A source of discontent for Riffians and especially the Ait Waryaghar was that rather than their own people being appointed to the new local administration of Al Hoceima after independence, French-speaking Istiqlal supporters from the "southern zone" (the area of Morocco previously colonised by the French) were appointed and given positions of power. For example, one of the first governors of the province was a black Casablancan who was compared to Bou Hmara's black general Jilali Mul l-Wudhu.

The ALN refused to recognise this independence because France and Spain were still present in Morocco and therefore continued the armed struggle in the Rif and in the Atlas, entering into open conflict with the Istiqlal party. The latter, led by Abdelkhalek Torres, Mehdi Ben Barka and Allal Al Fassi, committed numerous crimes (assassinations and kidnappings) against ALN sympathisers. Haddou Aqchich and Abbas Lamsaadi, fighters and emblematic figures of the ALN were assassinated. The Riffian population, feeling more and more marginalised and attacked by the Istiqlal party in power, decided to revolt in October 1958.

== Timeline ==
According to the Moroccan researcher Hsain Ilahiane, the revolts were ignited by the closure of the Algerian border to Rif migration, leading to unemployment, in addition to the total lack of Rif political representation in the Moroccan government.

In October 1958, riots started in the Rif region, as a result of marginalization of the region by the central authority. Sellam Amezian directed this movement. On 7 October 1958, the protesters issued a chart with a list of demands including "The immediate withdraw of all foreign forces from Morocco, and the return of Abd el-Krim and his family to the country".

Although very poorly armed and with almost no foreign support, Ameziane's two to three thousand men (mainly ex-Spanish Legion, the ALN, and Khattabi's army) inflicted several severe defeats on the royal army. About a thousand soldiers lost their lives. The Crown Prince's plane was even shot down by insurgent fire, but Hassan escaped. The fighting was so fierce, especially in the Beni Ouriaghel and Gueznaya, that the army resorted to aviation, artillery and (French) tanks to gain the upper hand. It was only two weeks later that the insurgents were routed. Their leaders were either arrested or fled. Amezian took refuge in Spain at first, then went to Egypt and Iraq.

On 11 November 1958, Ameziane of the PDI and two other members from the Rif, Abdel Sadaq Khattabi and Abdelkrim al-Khattabi's son, Rachid, presented an 18-point programme for the Rif to Mohammed V. This programme encompassed the concerns of the Riffians, ranging from the evacuation of foreign troops from the Rif, the return of Abdelkrim al-Khattabi to Morocco, job creation, political representation and tax reductions. However, before this programme was presented to the king, the Rif revolt had already started for almost three weeks. On 25 October 1958, the Istiqlal Party offices in Imzoûrene were stormed and government soldiers were overpowered. It was here that the uprising took the form of a real revolt.

On 26 December, a harka (a punitive expedition) was decided. The Moroccan prince Hassan II directed the operations from Tetouan. On the ground, it was Commander Oufkir who directed the most decisive operations. Four fifths of the army, i.e. 20,000 men, were deployed in the region. To legitimise this action, Mohammed V gave a speech on 5 January 1959. He castigated the insurgents and gave them forty-eight hours to surrender. In reality, the operations had already started on 2 January 1959. In parallel to the military operations, the monarchy imposed a media blackout. Journalists, especially foreigners, are banned from the region. Those who dare to venture there without permission are arrested and turned away. This is the case of the correspondents of several French, English and American media. Moroccan newspapers, whatever their political colour, are content to reproduce the information blown to them by the authorities and to publish editorials on command crying conspiracy. Publications that deviate from the official script are automatically censored.

The events escalated quickly, and weapons started to be used by both the protesters and the army. The uprising was fiercely oppressed by the army, even using aircraft flown by French pilots. Hundreds were killed and thousands were arrested and wounded. Abd El-Karim estimated the number of detainees in the wake of the Rif uprising at 8,420.

== 18-point programme ==
The 18-point programme was submitted to Mohammed V by Sellam Ameziane and two other members of the Ait Waryaghar (Abdel Sadaq Khattabi and Abdelkrim al-Khattabi's son, Rachid) on 11 November 1958:

1. Evacuation of all foreign troops from Morocco
2. Formation of a popular government with a wide base
3. Abolition of all political parties and formation of a government of national unity
4. Local recruitment of local civil servants
5. Freedom for all political parties
6. Return of Abd el-Krim to Morocco
7. Guarantees to dissidents against reprisals
8. Choice of capable judges
9. Reorganisation of the Ministry of Justice
10. Bringing of criminals to justice
11. A Riffian to be given an important post in the Moroccan government
12. Operation Plow to be extended to the Rif
13. Tax reduction for all of Morocco especially the Rif
14. Creation of an ambition program against unemployment
15. Creation of scholarships for Riffian students
16. Rapid Arabization of education all over Morocco
17. Creation of more rural schools
18. Reopening of the Lycée in Al Hoceima

== Aftermath ==
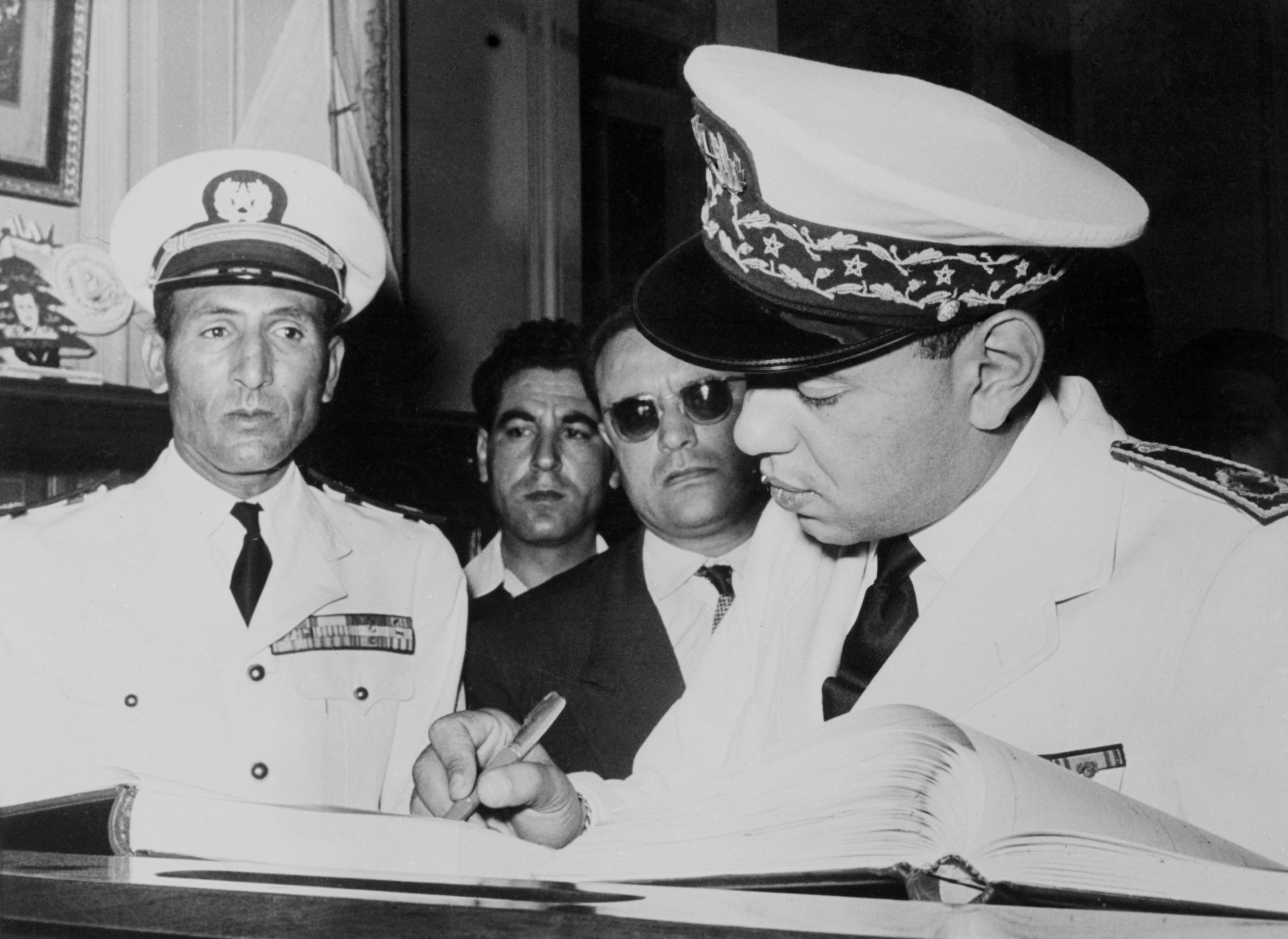
Mohamed Oufkir (left) and Crown Prince Moulay Hassan (right) in 1956

The Moroccan army lost about a thousand men, while 2,000-8,000 Riffian rebels were killed and 8,420 were captured. The brutal repression was carried out by the army under Prince Hassan while Mohamed Oufkir served as his close associate as well as being the head of the secret services. Oufkir's bloody repression of the Rif caused him to be identified as the "butcher of the Rif". Oufkir collectively punished the Rif through expropriation, crop-burning, rape, forced disappearances, torture mass executions and the displacement of people. The Ait Waryaghar were targeted in particular. Both were responsible for napalmed villages and mass arrests.

After the end of the uprising, the Rif was subjected to military rule for several years. The region was left neglected by Moroccan authorities causing the region to become underdeveloped and pushing many Riffians to migrate. According to data collected by the Ministry of Labour, the Rif administrative region had labour emigration rates of 26 person per thousand and al-Hoceima administrative region had labour emigration rates of 19 persons per thousand. This was higher compared to rest of Morocco which averaged less than 10 persons per thousand. By 1974, 18% of all migration from Morocco came from Nador Province despite it only housing only 3% of the Moroccan population.

A lot of the social demands put forth by the Hirak Rif Movement echoed that of the 1958 revolt. One of the demands put forth by the Hirak Rif called for the revoking of Dahir 1.58.381 issued on 24 November 1958 making Al Hoceima a military region and causing it to have a higher presence of police and army in the region.

== See also ==
- Hirak Rif
- Rif War
- 1981 Moroccan riots
- Moroccan Intifada of 1984
