= Clarence Crafoord =

Swedish cardiovascular surgeon

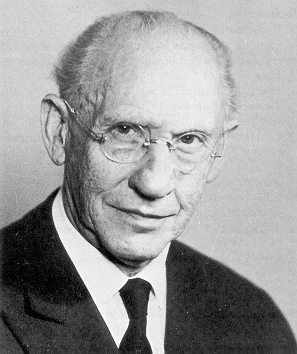
- Clarence Crafoord
- Born: 28 May 1899; Hudiksvall, Sweden
- Died: 25 February 1984 (aged 84)
- Education: Karolinska Institute
- Known for: Repair of aortic coarctation
- Awards: Gairdner Foundation International Award (1962)
- Scientific career
- Fields: surgery

Clarence Crafoord (28 May 1899 – 25 February 1984) was a Swedish cardiovascular surgeon, best known for performing the first successful repair of aortic coarctation on 19 October 1944, one year before Robert E. Gross. Crafoord also introduced heparin as thrombosis prophylaxis in the 1930s and he pioneered mechanical positive-pressure ventilation during thoracic operations in the 1940s.

Crafoord was professor of thoracic surgery at Karolinska Institute from 1948 to 1966.
