= Sellam Amezian =

Moroccan politician

- ⵍⵃⴰⵊ ⵙⴻⵍⵍⴰⵎ ⴰⵎⵣⵉⴰⵏ
- Born: 1925; Beni Boukhlef, Al Hoceima, Morocco
- Died: 9 September 1995 (aged 70); Bergen op Zoom, The Netherlands
- Known for: Leader of the Rif Revolt
- Political party: Democratic Independence Party

Mohammed Sellam Amezian (Tarifit: Muhammed nj-Hajj Sillam n-Muh Amzzyan; Arabic: محمد الحاج سلام أمزيان; 1925 – 9 September 1995) was a Moroccan politician, a member of the Democratic Independence Party and a veteran of the Moroccan Army of Liberation. He led the Rif Revolt (1958-1959).

== Early life ==
Mohammed Sellam Amezian was born in 1925 in Beni Boukhlef, within the Ait Ouriaghel tribe in the Rif region in northern Morocco. He studied at the University of al-Qarawiyyin in Fez and graduated from it. At the beginning of the fifties, he was sent to teach in Karia Ba Mohamed, where he remained four years, before moving to Tangier and Tétouan to pursue his teaching career. In parallel with his work, he was politically active as a member of the Moroccan Army of Liberation and the Democratic Independence Party.

He was from the Ait Bu 'Ayyash khoms of the Ait Ouriaghel and under the Spanish protectorate was a sub-fractional mqaddim. However, he lost his job under independence like with other local Riffian authorities.

== The Rif Revolt ==
In October 1958, riots started in the Rif region, as a result of marginalization of the region by the central authority. Sellam Amezian directed this movement. In fact, he embodied all the frustrations associated with independence. He came from a prestigious Riffian lineage that the new ruling class marginalized, he was a member of the MLA and the DIP, both of which the palace and the Istiqlal Party hoped to eliminate. He was also a victim of extortion at the hands of the authorities, having spent more than two years in prison without being formally charged. On 7 October 1958, the protesters issued a chart with a list of demands including "The immediate withdraw of all foreign forces from Morocco, and the return of Abd el-Krim and his family to the country".

The events escalated quickly, and weapons started to be used by both the protesters and the army. The uprising was fiercely oppressed by the army, even using aircraft flown by French pilots. Hundreds were killed and thousands were arrested and wounded. Abd El-Karim estimated the number of detainees in the wake of the Rif uprising at 8420.

== Life in exile ==
After the crush of the Rif Revolt, Sellam Amezian sought initially refuge in Spain before leaving for Egypt then Iraq. He remained in Iraq until 1994 before moving to the Netherlands, where he lived until dying on 9 September 1995. He was later buried in his hometown of Beni Boukhlef in Morocco.

One of his sons, Mohammed Amezian is a journalist, and worked with Radio Netherlands Worldwide from 2008 to 2017.
