= Ryazan miracle =

Controversy regarding Soviet meat production

The Ryazan miracle (or Ryazan affair; Russian: рязанское чудо, lit. 'Ryazan miracle', or Russian: рязанский эксперимент, lit. 'Ryazan experiment', Рязанская авантюра "Ryazan shady venture") was an economic scandal that happened in 1959 and 1960 in Ryazan Oblast, Soviet Union. Following new highly ambitious plans put forward by Nikita Khrushchev to "surpass America", Alexei Larionov, chief of the Communist Party Committee of Ryazan Oblast, promised increases in meat and milk production plans that were widely and boldly advertised in Soviet propaganda until widespread lies and falsification were uncovered. These proved to be disastrous to Ryazan's economy and became a major blow to Khrushchev's political image.

== Background ==
On May 22, 1957, Nikita Khrushchev, the Soviet leader at that time, made a speech at a regional meeting of Soviet agroindustry representatives, in which he aired his famous slogan "Catch up and overtake America" (Russian: Догнать и перегнать Америку). In this speech Khrushchev promised to surpass the United States in economic growth and to provide the material and technical foundation of communism by 1980. In his speech he stated a goal in tripling rates of meat production within next three years, the implementation of which though remained far from feasible. A year after the promise the production had not grown and the USSR was still experiencing food shortages. Khrushchev expressed discontent and, towards the end of 1958, the Central Committee of CPSU issued a circular (decree) to obkoms, regional party committees at the oblast (administrative subject) level, to take "decisive action" to ensure improvements in meat production in 1959.

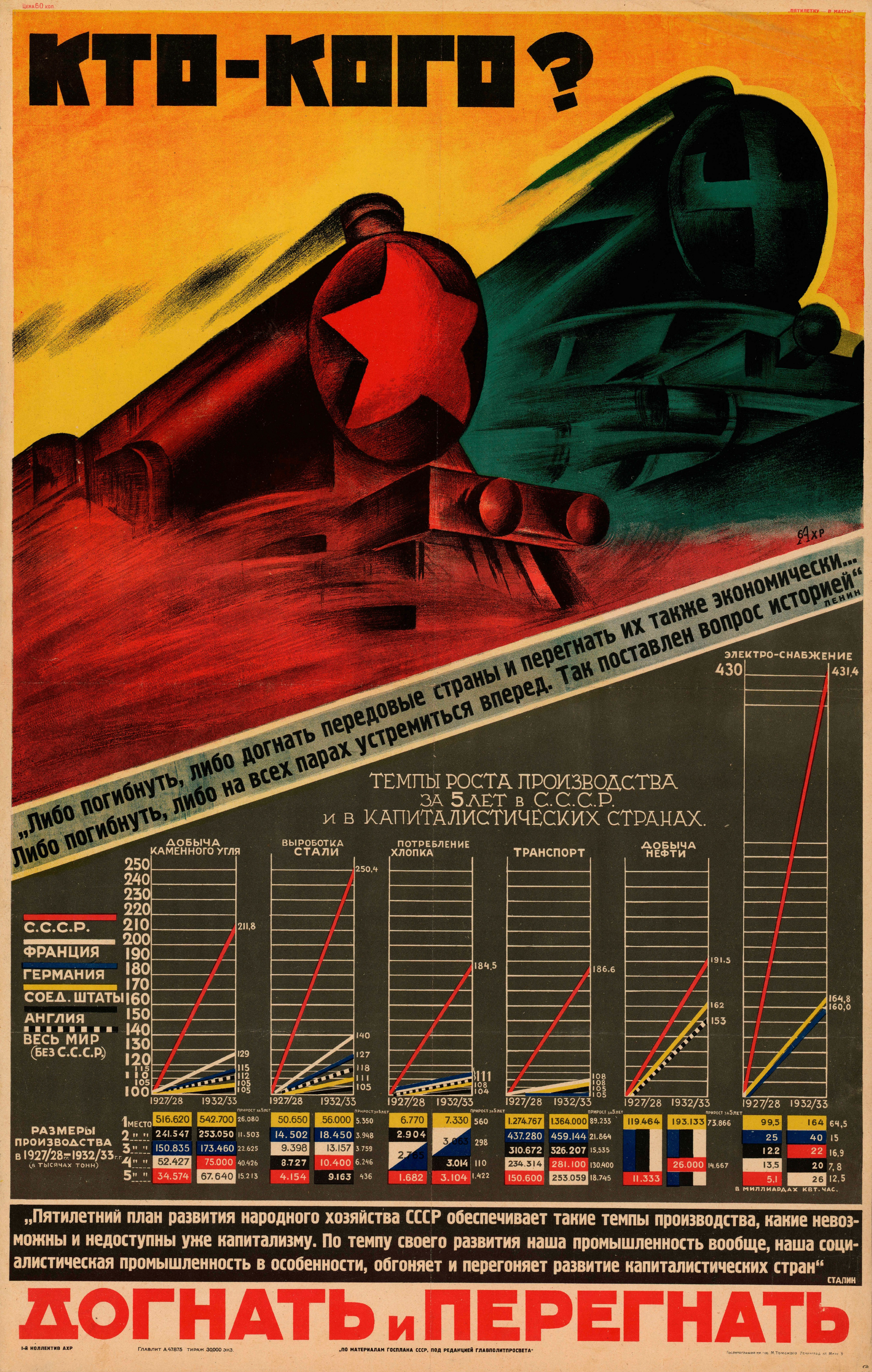
"Catch up and overtake" (Russian: Кто кого? Догнать и перегнать). A 1929 Soviet propaganda poster based on 1917 paraphrase from Lenin, praising the economic superiority of Marxist economy.

== Miracle ==
Following Khruschev ambitious plans, Larionov (first secretary (head) of the Ryazan Obkom), took on the campaign and declared a goal to triple amount of meat produced within the next year. The promise, despite being practically infeasible, was approved at the regional party conference. On October 12, 1958, Larionov delivered the promise to Khrushchev in person, who became excited by the initiative. On January 9, 1959, the promise was published in Pravda, the official party newspaper at the time. The publication was rushed by Khrushchev in spite of objections from the Agricultural Department of the Central Committee. The challenge was met by several other regions including Stavropol and Krasnodar. Even before starting its ambitious plan, the Ryazan region received several awards. In February 1959, the region was awarded with the Order of Lenin.

=== Livestock slaughter ===
In order to meet the promise, the region had to slaughter all offspring of the bovine herd of 1959, as well as a considerable part of its dairy and husbandry stock. In addition, all cattle reared by kolkhoz farmers in their private households was appropriated and included in the report. As the collected amount was still not enough to meet the target, the obkom had to buy meat from neighbor regions by reallocating funds allocated for other purposes, such as the purchase of agricultural tools and construction. In December 1959, Ryazan obkom reported that the region delivered 150,000 tons of meat to the state, which was three times the amount delivered the previous year. On top of this, the regional authorities promised to deliver 180,000 in the next year.

On December 27, 1959, the success was announced by Khrushchev himself at the CPSU Plenum "On further development of agricultural production" (О дальнейшем развитии сельскохозяйственного производства). On 25 December 1959, Larionov was awarded the title of Hero of Socialist Labour.

=== Disaster ===
However, in 1960 production of meat in Ryazan oblast plummeted to 30,000 tons, since mass slaughter had reduced the number of cattle by 65% in comparison to the level of 1958. To make matters worse, collective farm (kolkhoz) workers whose private cattle were "temporarily" appropriated the year earlier refused to process collective farm land. This halved the amount of grain produced in Ryazan. By the fall of 1960, it became impossible to hide all disastrous consequences. In September 1960, Larionov was dismissed from his post. It was rumored that on October 10, 1960, he committed suicide, however, the announcement in the local newspaper reported that he died of heart attack; However, his obituary in Pravda, published on 24 September 1960, said that he died of a serious illness on 22 September 1960. Even post-mortem he was not stripped of his title of Hero of Labour.

== Aftermath ==
Similar events happening on a smaller scale in other regions of the Soviet Union resulted in a statewide drop in agricultural production. Around the same time, Khrushchev became obsessed with growing maize and forced its widespread planting. Some party leaders in northwest Russia and the Baltic were also eager to report their aspirations in following the party line, even though maize does not grow well in northern regions.

All these events gave a blow to Khrushchev's image in the Soviet Union. His slogan "Catch up and overtake America" was widely mocked in jokes. The events contributed to his final fall from power in 1964.

== See also ==
- "Maize fever" (Russian Кукурузная кампания) — a countrywide campaign to switch USSR farming to maize, which resulted in one quarter of all arable lands being occupied by maize and eventually failed as central planners ignored soil and climate differences between regions of USSR
- Exceeding the UK, catching the USA, Chinese slogan
