= Rune Elmqvist =

Swedish inventor, physician and cardiac surgeon

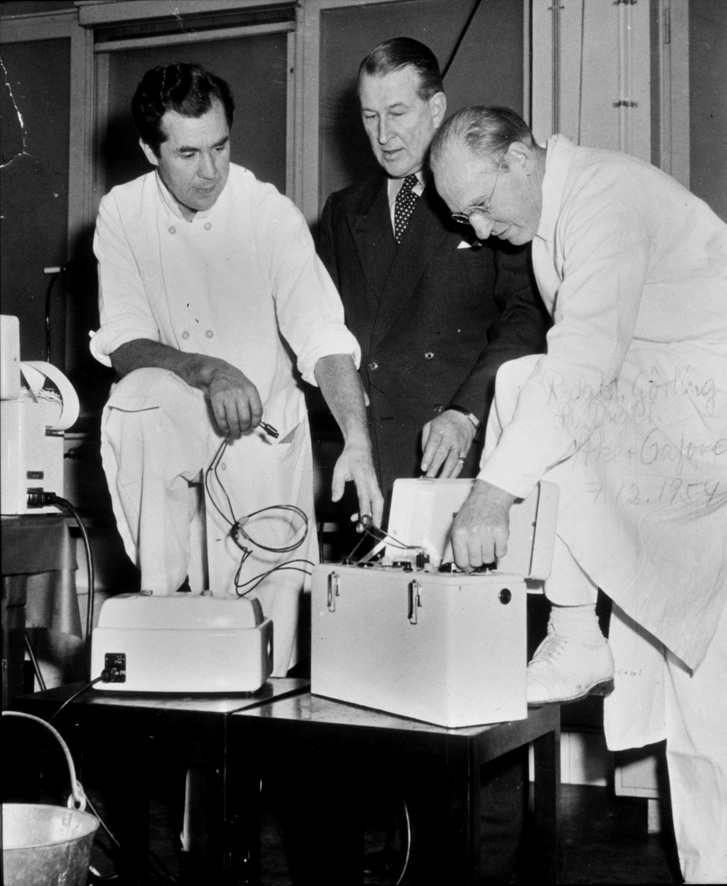
- Elmqvist [centre], Senning & Crafoord, 1954.
- Born: 1906; Lund, Sweden
- Died: 1996 (aged 89–90)
- Education: Lund University
- Engineering career
- Discipline: Medicine
- Projects: Invented first implantable pacemaker
- Awards: Honorary Doctorate

Rune Elmqvist (1 December 1906 – 15 December 1996) was a Swedish physician turned engineer who developed the first implantable pacemaker in 1958, working under the direction of Åke Senning, senior physician and cardiac surgeon at the Karolinska University Hospital in Solna, Sweden.

Elmqvist was born in Lund, and received his MD in 1939. Elmqvist initially worked as a medical doctor (having trained in Lund), but later worked as an engineer and inventor. In 1927 he developed an electronic potentiometer to measure pH and in 1931 he developed a multichannel electrocardiograph. In 1940 he joined the electronics firm Elema-Schönander which would later become Siemens-Elema. In 1948, he developed the first inkjet ECG printer which he called the mingograph while working at Elema-Schönander. The first pacemaker was developed in the 1950s and it was tested by Dr Senning on patient Arne Larsson at the request of the patient's wife. It was implanted in a surgery on October 8, 1958. The pacemaker was based on a single transistor and gave 2V pulses at intervals of 1.5 milliseconds to produce 70 heartbeats per minute. The first pacemaker worked for three hours only and then it had to be replaced and the second lasted for six weeks. The earliest pacemaker had been moulded with Araldite epoxy which was biocompatible inside a Kiwi shoe-polish container. Larsson needed nearly 30 pacemakers during his lifetime and he lived until 2001, outliving both Elmquist and his surgeon Dr Senning who died in 2000. In 1957, Elmquist received an honorary doctorate and in 1976 he received a gold medal of the Royal Academy of Technology and Science of Sweden.

In 1960, he became head of development at Elema-Schönander. Siemens-Elema's pacemaker operations were sold to the American company Pacesetter Systems in 1994, which was subsequently sold to St Jude Medical of Minnesota. His son Hakan Elmqvist became a professor of medical technology at the Karolinska Institute.
