= Åke Senning =

Swedish surgeon

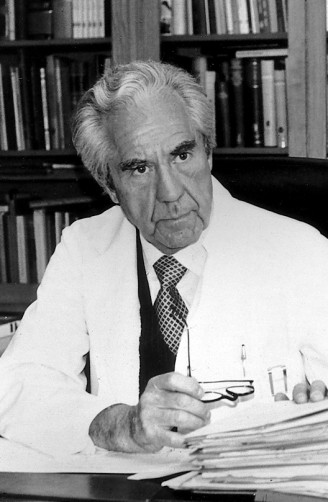
- Born: December 14, 1915; Rättvik, Sweden
- Died: July 21, 2000 (aged 84); Zurich, Switzerland
- Occupation: Cardiac surgeon
- Years active: 1948 - 1985
- Known for: Cardiac biomedical research
- Notable work: Implantable cardiac pacemaker, heart lung machine
- Title: Swedish Kungliga Serafimerorden, Swedish Kungliga Nordstjärneorden

Åke Senning (14 December 1915 – 21 July 2000) was a Swedish cardiac surgeon who worked at University Hospital of Zürich from 1961 until his retirement in 1985.

== Biography ==
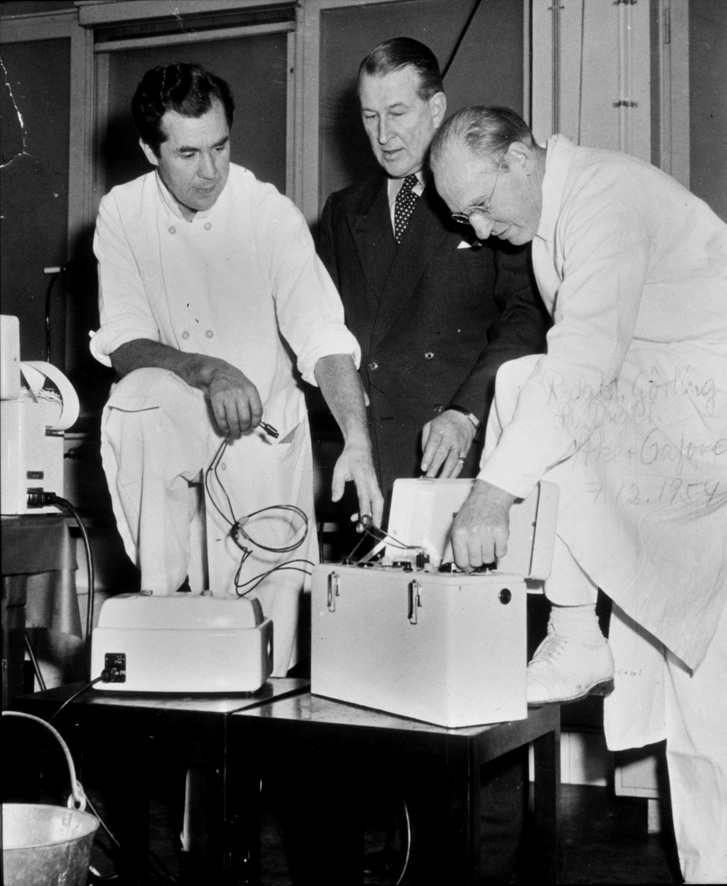
Senning, Elmqvist and Crafoord with an external pacemaker, Stockholm 1958

Senning was born to Swedish veterinarian David Senning and nurse Elly Senning, née Säfström. He finished his schooling in Uppsala with a baccalaureate. He wanted to become an engineer; however, as a nurse in World War 1, his mother persuaded him to study medicine. He completed the pre-clinical part of his studies in Uppsala, the clinical part and his state examination in Stockholm in 1948. His subsequent further training in Stockholm included thoracic and general surgery, orthopaedics and neurosurgery.

Clarence Crafoord introduced him to the field of cardiac surgery in 1948. The influence of this eminent surgeon, who had a major impact on thoracic and cardiac surgery, fostered Senning's passion in cardiac surgery and thus helped determine the direction of his work throughout his life, attributing this to Crafoord and holding him in high esteem. With his work on electrically induced ventricular fibrillation to prevent air embolisms in cardiac surgery, he significantly reduced the risk of complications in cardiac surgery. Through this, Senning became a private lecturer in Experimental Thoracic and Cardiac Surgery in Stockholm in 1952 and was appointed Extraordinary Professor of Surgery in 1956. In 1957, he was elected senior physician in the Department of Thoracic Surgery at the Karolinska University Hospital (Karolinska Sjukhuset). In 1961, he followed the call to the chair of surgery at the University of Zurich and thus succeeded Theodor Billroth, Rudolf U. Krönlein, Ferdinand Sauerbruch, and Alfred Brunner.

As Alfred Brunner's direct successor, he took up his post on 16 April 1961 as director of the Surgical University Clinic A in Zurich—with over 120 beds and 18 intensive care beds—where he worked with great dedication until his retirement a quarter of a century later on 15 April 1985. In the first nine months of his tenure, 108 heart operations were performed, two years later 264 and in his last year in office 937. In 1969, he performed the first two heart transplantss in Switzerland. At the beginning of his Zurich days, the lethality rate of patients operated on by heart-lung machine was over 50 per cent and the age limit for such an operation was 35. By 1979, the lethality rate was less than one per cent, and the age limit was no longer the calendar age, but the biological age of the patients.

After his retirement, he continued to live in Zurich. Together with some of his former colleagues, he was instrumental in setting up the Zurich Hirslanden Heart Centre. All over the world he assisted appointed surgeons and guided them in his heart operations, which are now considered classic. He participated in a golf club to keep his hands supple, because he had never learned to sit still. With an unusual vitality he survived several operations he had to undergo. It was characteristic of him, for example, that after a serious skiing accident with a broken knee, he operated again the very next day with his leg in plaster.

During his career he published 350 articles in the fields of medical technology, thoracic, cardiovascular and general surgery, kidney and heart transplantation, treatment of vertebral tumours and renal artery stenosis.

He was buried at the Fluntern Cemetery in Zurich.

== Scientific achievements ==
Heart-lung-machine

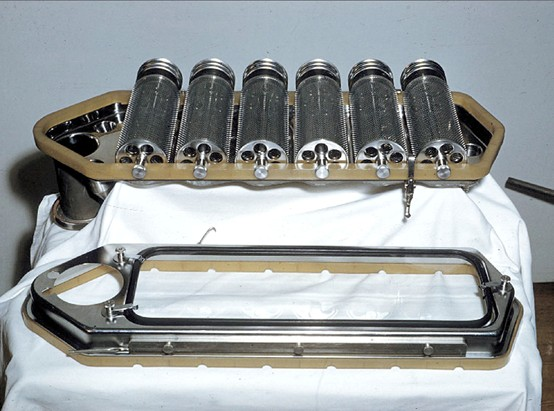
The Roller-Oxygenator according to Senning

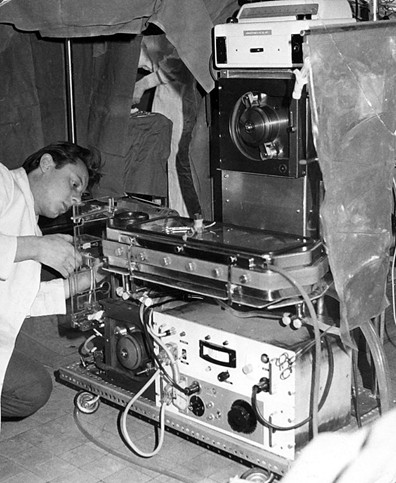
Further development of the heart-lung machine according to Crafoord/Senning 1951

It was Clarence Crafoord who put him in a windowless basement room at the Karolinska University Hospital in Stockholm and gave him the task of developing a heart-lung machine, which he succeeded in doing in a relatively short time. This achievement by Senning shows that external working conditions are never general prerequisites for the success of a work. Often - as here - the opposite is the case: external restriction leads to inward concentration. This is how the first heart-lung machine with the roller oxygenator and the associated hypothermia came into being.

Roll Oxygenator

Senning's personal contributions to the development of cardiac, vascular and thoracic surgery begin as early as 1949 with the development of a Roller Oxygenator, which was successful in animal experiments in 1951 and successfully used in the world's second operation on humans and the first in Europe in 1953.

Open-heart surgery on humans

Together with Clarence Crafoord, he performed the first successful open-heart surgery on humans in Europe using the heart-lung machine in 1953.

Implantable heart pacemaker

Together with the electrical engineer Rune Elmqvist, Åke Senning developed the first implantable pacemaker in 1958, consisting of two externally rechargeable NiCd cells and a blocking oscillator (pulse amplitude 2.5 V, duration 2 ms, frequency 70 Hz) with two germanium transistors. The components of the first device were placed in a shoe polish box and this was filled with epoxy resin.

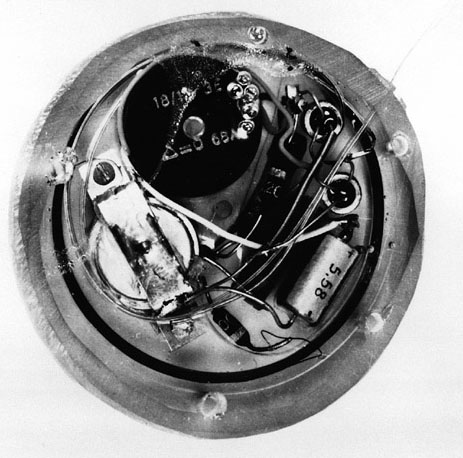
Original of the worldwide first implantable heart pacemaker, 1958

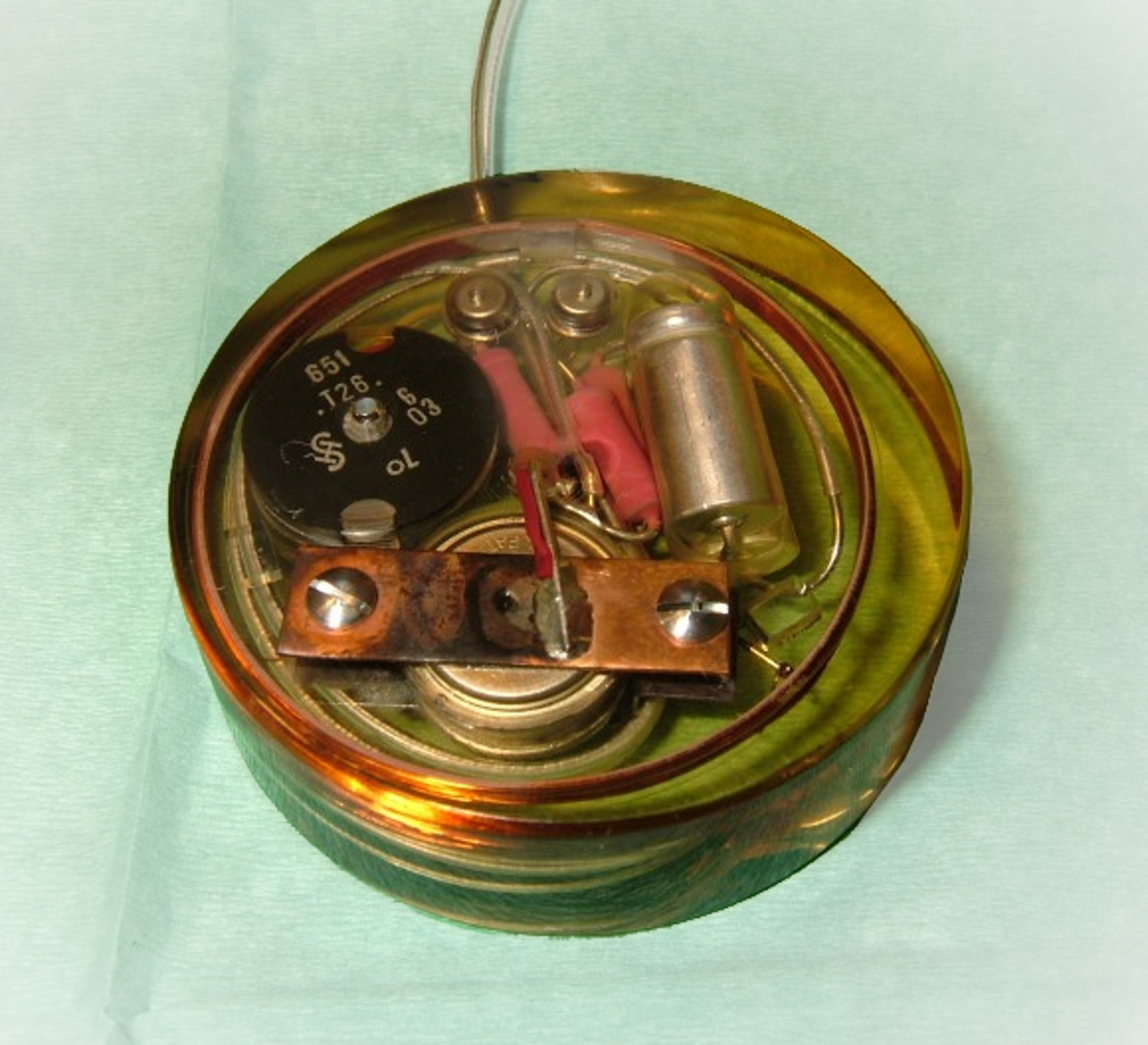
Copy of the first implantable heart pacemaker

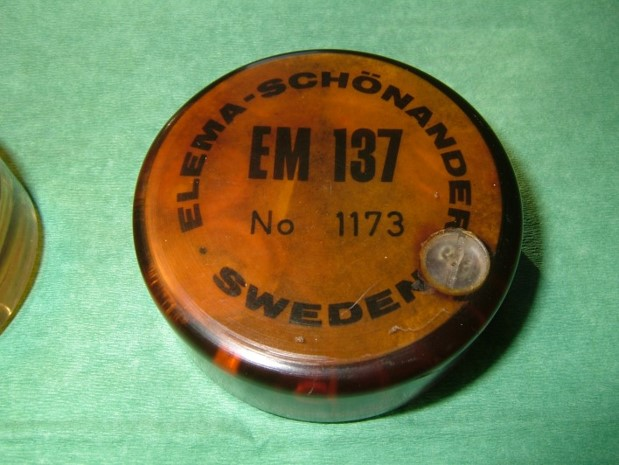
First commercial heart pacemaker (Elema-Schönander), 1960–61

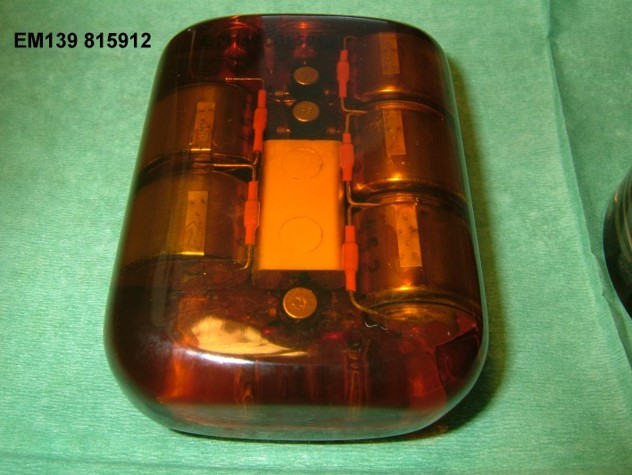
Commercial heart pacemaker (Elema-Schönander), 1965–66

Senning implanted the first implantable pacemaker in the 43-year-old patient Arne Larsson on 8 October 1958 and subsequently developed this invention further. He was asked on several occasions to patent his research results. Senning was opposed to any medical patent on the grounds that valuable time would be lost and that the suffering people would only benefit from his idea much later. He repeatedly said: "Medical discoveries belong to the patients and not to the inventor. If we hadn't invented it, someone else would have done it tomorrow".

Arne Larsson, the first pacemaker patient, outlived his surgeon after having to replace 26 pacemakers due to battery exhaustion over the past almost 43 years. He died a year after Senning's death from metastatic melanoma.

Transposition of the great vessels

The so-called transposition of the great vessels is a congenital malformation in which the aorta is connected to the right and the pulmonary artery to the left ventricle of the heart. In the absence of other malformations, such as an open atrial septal defect or an open ductus arteriosus botalli, the children die shortly after birth. In Senning's neighbour's house in Sweden, a child died of a transposition of the great vessels. Inspired by this sad case, Senning spent all night scribbling drawings on paper that only he could read. With his enormous three-dimensional imagination, Senning's surgical method for correcting transposition of the great vessels was created that night, which was to make history as the Senning operation. The ingenious technical execution could have occurred to someone else, but much more important was Senning's realisation that the right ventricle could also generate systemic pressure. Besides curing numerous children with transposition of the great vessels, this idea also paved the way for many other heart operations.

Electrically induced ventricular fibrillation

As early as 1951, he completed the extracorporeal circuit technique, using electrically induced ventricular fibrillation during cardiac arrest to prevent air embolism and hypothermia to reduce oxygen consumption. Decades later, when asked what was the most important of his inventions, he replied: Electrically induced ventricular fibrillation to prevent air embolism; that saved the most lives! Later it was replaced by drug-induced cardioplegia.

Correction of defective confluence of pulmonary veins with left atrium

Two years later (1956) he performed the first total correction of a congenital malposition of the junction of the pulmonary veins with the left atrium, and in 1958 the first total correction of a complete transposition of the great vessels mentioned above.

World's first operation on the coronaries using the strip graft technique

Since 1955, long before the first bypass operation by René Favaloro in Cleveland in 1968, Senning had been experimentally and later clinically involved in coronary surgery. In 1958, he successfully performed the first coronary operation worldwide using the strip-graft technique, i.e. the first endarterectomy of the coronary arteries, which was completed with a vena saphena graft. In the same year, he inserted an implantable pacemaker for the first time, a step that would later save the lives of millions.

Correction of an atrial septal defect

In 1959, he closed an atrial septal defect.

Surgical technique left atrial bypass

In 1963 followed the first successful use of a left heart bypass, the first step for the LVAD (left ventricular assist device), the artificial left heart, so common today.

Development of an aortic valve replacement

Together with Donald N. Ross in London, Senning also opened the way for anticoagulation-free follow-up of heart valve patients. Independently and without knowledge of D. Ross' autografting of the pulmonary valve, he developed the technique of aortic valve replacement by free autografts of the fascia lata two months after Ross in October 1962. Together with Martin Rothlin, he was then able to report, in 1971, 141 cases that he had corrected the aortic valve with this surgical method, as well as over 100 cases of mitral valve reconstruction. Again, this was one of his early Zurich achievements that was adopted throughout the world.

Kidney transplants

Having barely arrived in Switzerland, Senning performed the first kidney transplantation in Switzerland on 17 December 1964 and shortly afterwards published the first major series of over 30 kidney transplants with cadaveric kidneys. Although the typing and organ reservation possibilities as well as the internal post-treatment therapy with immunosuppression were not yet sufficiently developed, his results of the first kidney transplants hardly differed from those of today. It is worth mentioning here that Senning's first kidney transplant series was the first to be published worldwide and that it was groundbreaking for the subsequent Largiadèr era.

Heart transplants

On 14 April 1969, Senning performed the first heart transplantation in Switzerland, and shortly afterwards the second. He refrained from further heart transplants, stating that a heart transplant was not a surgical problem but a pharmaceutical one. Thus, regular heart transplants were not performed in Züriche until ten years later, when cyclosporine, which brought the clinical breakthrough of heart transplantation, was available.

Correction of a Budd-Chiari syndrome

A milestone was the ingenious correction of a Budd-Chiari syndrome, crowned with success in 1981, in which he surgically removed the outflow stenosis of the hepatic veins through the right heart. This opened up a new path for liver surgery. This idea was in turn so groundbreaking that the banal liver puncture, a routine method, has nowadays been replaced by the transvenous, transatrial liver biopsy. This eliminated the risk of intra-abdominal haemorrhage.

Balloon dilatation

Andreas Grüntzig, who first performed the now widely used coronary balloon dilatation in Zurich on 16 December 1977, needed Senning's assistance because the delicate coronary vessel could rupture during dilatation and the patient could die shortly afterwards. This first balloon dilatation in humans was performed in the animal laboratory of cardiac surgery, which not only had more modern equipment than cardiology, but also the neighbouring animal operating room could be converted at short notice for open-heart surgery in humans. Åke Senning and Marco Turina were standing by next to Grüntzig so that, in the event of a rupture of the coronary artery, they could intervene immediately with the surgical team standing by in the animal experimental laboratory.

Further developments Similar small and larger advances were also the development of the intra-arterial vascular coil, a precursor of intra-arterial vascular prostheses, together with Dierk Maas, the various pacemaker electrodes together with Istvan Babotai, the baby heart-lung machine together with Babotai and Marco Turina, the left diaphragm replacement with pedicled pericardial valves together with Paul Hahnloser, the technique of kidney transplantation together with Felix Largiadèr and the removal of renal artery stenoses together with Georg Mayor and Ernst Zingg. But also Martin Rothlin, Willy Meier, Ruth Gattiker, O. Läpple, Markus Jenny and many other collaborators contributed ideas which he then put into practice. The small Senning Bulldog clamp, the Senning suction cup, the Senning/Babotai valve of the Siemens respirator, the numerous modifications of the pacemaker electrodes, which finally led to the Babotai Helix electrode.

Furthermore, the Björck's thoracoplasty, which was first performed by Senning while still in Stockholm, and the funnel chest correction according to Senning-Johansson, which was first performed in 1951.

First intensive care unit in Central Europe

The first intensive care unit in Central Europe was installed on 17 April 1961 in three offices of the Surgical Clinic A and that the world's first cardiac surgery intensive care unit, then called the Cardiac Awake Room, was set up in an aft room of the same clinic. Already in the first nine months of his tenure (1961), 108 heart operations were performed and treated post-operatively in this intensive care unit. Two years later there were already 264 and in his last full year in office in 1984 there were 937. With this, too, Senning wrote medical history.

His concept of intensive medicine differed from that of intensive care physicians and anaesthesiologists. Senning was far ahead of his time, because he demanded and enforced that each discipline should have its own intensive care unit. Surgeons, internists, paediatricians and other specialists should continue to look after their patients together with the anaesthetist, as is the case in the operating theatre. For Senning, it was unthinkable to hand over responsibility for his patients for a few hours or days to a third party who had not previously seen the patient. He retained responsibility for his patients throughout the entire period of hospitalisation. Thus, several intensive care units with separate management were established in Zurich, such as the cardiac, general and thoracic surgery, medical, traumatology, neurosurgery, gynaecology-obstetrics, urology, paediatrics, neonatology intensive care units and the intensive care unit for burn patients. A concept that is not always readily recognised as a much better one for the highly specialised university hospitals or other tertiary centres. Senning's principle has stood the test of time for tertiary centres. Worldwide, the Haematological, Neonatological, Paediatric, Cardiac, Coronary, Neurosurgical, Traumatological and Burn Intensive Care Units are already self-sufficient in tertiary centres.

== Honors and awards ==
- 1965 Clement Price Thomas Award des Royal College of Surgeons of England
- 1965 Olof af Acrel-Preis der Schwedischen Chirurgengesellschaft
- 1976 Aachener und Münchener Preis für Technik und angewandte Naturwissenschaften
- 1977 René Lériche-Preis der Societé Internationale de Chirurgie
- 1978 Nessim-Habif World Prize, University of Geneva
- 1979 Ernst Jung-Preis für Medizin

The Swedish King honoured Prof. Senning with the Royal Order of the Seraphine (Swedish Kungliga Serafimerorden) as well as the Royal Order of the North Star (Swedish Kungliga Nordstjärneorden).

== Memberships ==
- 1968 Member of the German Academy of Sciences Leopoldina
- 1970 Honorary Member of the American College of Surgeons
- 1970 Corresponding Member of the American, Chilean and Italian Societies of Surgeons
- 1971 Honorary Member of International College for Angiology
- 1971 Honorary Member of the British and Irish Society for Thoracic, Cardiac and Vascular Surgery
- 1974 Honorary Member of the Rinnovamento Medico in Roma
- 1974 Honorary member of the Panhellenic Society of Surgeons in Athens
- 1975 Honorary Member of the Royal College of Edinburgh
- 1976 Honorary Member of the Royal College of Surgeons of England
- 1976 Honorary Member of the Polish Socitety of Surgeons
- 1981 Honorary Member of the Egyptic Cardiovascular Socitety
- 1982 Honorary Member of the European Cardiovascular Society
- 1984 Honorary Member of the German Surgeon Society

== Papers (Excerpt) ==
- Senning Å., Johansson, L. Korrektur einer Trichterbrust 1951
- Senning Å. Thorakoplastik 1951
- Senning Å (1952). "Kammerflimmern während der extrakorporalen Zirkulation als Methode zur Verhinderung von Luftembolien und zur Erleichterung von intrakardialen Operationen". Acta Chir. Scand. Suppl. 171: 1–79.
- Senning, Å. "Kammerflimmern als Methode zur Erleichterung intrakardialer Operationen. Acta Chir. Scand.. 1952 (suppl), 172
- Senning Å (1954). "Extrakorporale Zirkulation in Kombination mit Hypothermie". Acta Chir. Scand. 107: 516–24.
- Senning Å (1955). "Eine Modifikation der Technik zum Verschluss von Vorhofseptumdefekten". Acta Chir. Scand. 109: 299.
- Crafoord C (1957). "Norberg B, Senning Å. Klinische Studien zur extrakorporalen Zirkulation mit einer Herz-Lungen-Maschine". Acta Chir. Scand. 112: 220–45.
- Crafoord C (1958). "Operationen am offenen Herzen mit Herz-Lungen Maschine". Langenbecks Archiv Klin. Chir. 289: 257–66. doi:10.1007/BF02432554.
- Senning Å (1958). "Vollständige Korrektur des anomalen pulmonalen Venenrückflusses". Annals of Surgery. 148: 99–103. doi:10.1097/00000658-195807000-00012. PMC 1450742. PMID 13545764.
- Senning Å. "Vollständige Korrektur einer Transposition der großen Arterien. Opuscula medica 1958;
- Senning Å (1958). "Operativ behandling av angina pectoris; kirurgiska synpunkter. (Chirurgische Behandlung der Angina pectoris; chirurgische Aspekte)". Nord Med. 60: 1455–9.
- Senning Å (1959). "Chirurgische Korrektur der Transposition der großen Gefäße". Chirurgie. 45: 966–80.
- Senning Å (1959). "Experimentelle Studien zur Chirurgie der Koronararterien, Strip-Graft-Technik (1955)". Acta Chir. Scand. 118: 81–5.
- Senning Å., Elmquist R. "Konstruktion und Implantation eines Herzschrittmachers (8.10.1958), Second International Conference of Medical Electronics, 1959.
- Senning Å (1959). "Chirurgische Korrektur der Transposition der großen Gefäße". Chirurgie. 45 (6): 966–980.
- Elmqvist R, Senning Å. "Implantierbarer Schrittmacher für das Herz. In: Proceedings of the Second International Conference on Medical Electronics, Paris, France, June 24–27, 1959. London: Iliffe & Son; 1960.
- Elmquist R., Senning Å. "Implantierbarer Schrittmacher für das Herz. In: Smyth CN. Ed. Medizinische Elektronik. Springfield, Illinois. Charles C. Thomas, 1960, S. * 250.
- Senning Å (1961). "Strip Grafting in Koronararterien". The Journal of Thoracic and Cardiovascular Surgery. 41 (4): 542–9. doi:10.1016/S0022-5223(20)31685-8.
- Senning Å. "The Senning-Crafoord heart-lung mashine, zitiert von Galletti P.P., Brecher G. A. Heart-Lung Bypass. New York & London, Grune & Stratton, 1962
- Senning Å (1963). "Linksventrikulärer Bypass (1953 ??)". Ann. Surg. 156: 263.
- Senning Å (1967). "Fascia lata-Ersatz von Aortenklappen". J. Cardiovasc. Surg. 54: 465–70.
- Senning Å (1971). "Aktueller Stand der klinischen Herztransplantation". Langenbecks Arch. Chir. 329: 799–805. doi:10.1007/BF01770632. PMID 4949863.
- Geroulanos S., Hahnloser P., Senning A. (1974). "Trichterbrustkorrektur: Indikation, chirurgisches Vorgehen und Ergebnisse einer vereinfachten und modifizierten Methode". Helv. Chir. Acta. 41: 101–8.
- Senning Å (1983). "Transcavale posterokranielle Resektion der Leber zur Behandlung des Budd-Chiari-Syndroms". World J. Surg. 7 (5): 632–40. doi:10.1007/BF01655344. PMID 6636808.
- Senning Å, Largiadèr F, Linder E, Scheitlin W (1968). "Homologe Leichennieren 1-3 Jahre nach Transplantation". Langenbecks Arch. Chir. 322: 528–32. doi:10.1007/BF02453871. PMID 4394916.
- Senning Å (1971). "Aktueller Stand der klinischen Herztransplantation". Langenbecks Arch Chir. 329: 799–805. doi:10.1007/BF01770632. PMID 4949863.
- Turina M., Babotai I., Gattiker R., Senning Å. (1973). "Eine Herz-Lungen-Maschine für Neugeborene und Säuglinge". Thoraxchir. Vasc. Chir. 21: 57–67.
- Senning Å (1983). "Transcavale posterokraniale Resektion der Leber zur Behandlung des Budd-Chiari-Syndroms". World J. Surg. 7 (5): 632–40. doi:10.1007/BF01655344. PMID 6636808.
- Larsson B, Elmqvist H, Ryden L, Schuller H (2003). "Lessons from the first patient with an implanted pacemaker: 1958-2001". Pacing Clin Electrophysiol. 26 (1): 114–124. doi:10.1046/j.1460-9592.2003.00162.x. PMID 12685152.

== Obituaries ==
- Cooley DA (2000). "In memoriam. Tribute to Ake Senning, pioneering cardiovascular surgeon". Tex Heart Inst J. 27 (3): 234–235.
- Geroulanos S. "Åke Senning". Nachruf Neue Zürcher Zeitung. 24 (7): 2000.
- Geroulanos S (2001). "Åke Senning in memoriam". Intern. J. Artific. Organs. 24 (2): 57–62. doi:10.1177/039139880102400201. PMID 11256509.
- Turina M (2000). "Åke Senning (1915-2000)". Cardiol Young. 11 (2): 247. doi:10.1017/S1047951101000221.
- Largiader F (2000). "Professor Åke Senning. 1915-2000". Schweizerische Arztezeitung. 81 (36): 2030–2031.
- Brunckhorst C, Candinas R, Furman S (2000). "Åke Senning 1915-2000". Journal of Pacing & Clinical Electrophysiology. 23 (11): 1710. doi:10.1046/j.1460-9592.2000.01710.x.
