= November 1958 =

Month of 1958

<<	November 1958					>>
Su	Mo	Tu	We	Th	Fr	Sa
						1
2	3	4	5	6	7	8
9	10	11	12	13	14	15
16	17	18	19	20	21	22
23	24	25	26	27	28	29
30

The following events occurred in November 1958:

== November 1, 1958 (Saturday) ==
- The crash of Cubana de Aviación Flight 495 killed 17 of the 20 people aboard, after being hijacked by rebels during its flight from Miami in the U.S. to the vacation resort of Varadero in Cuba. The Vickers Viscount 755 apparently ran out of fuel and crashed on a beach at Punta Tabaco as it was approaching the airport for the village of Preston in Cuba.
- A court in Havana refused to suspend the November 3 presidential elections in Cuba, after candidate Carlos Márquez Sterling asked that voting be delayed in the provinces of Oriente and Las Villas because of violence.
- One day after the U.S. and British moratorium on nuclear testing had gone into effect, the Soviet Union exploded a "relatively low yield" atomic weapon at its test site, and followed with another one two days later. U.S. President Eisenhower responded by statement that "We shall continue suspension of such tests for the time being, and we understand that the United Kingdom will do likewise. We hope that the Soviet Union will also do so. If there is not shortly a corresponding renunciation by the Soviet Union, the United States will be obliged to reconsider its position."

== November 2, 1958 (Sunday) ==
- Thailand's dictator, Field Marshal Sarit Thanarat, issued Proclamation No. 21 as the Supreme Commander of the Armed Forces and commander of the Revolutionary Council that had overthrown the civilian prime minister in 1957. Proclamation 21 was directed against the anthaphan in urban areas, thousands of people identified by the council as hooligans, with the goal of removing "a menace to society and the common people" in order to "promote the happiness of the people." The proclamation soon extended to the round up of nonconformist young people who had long hair or "flashy clothes", who could be among those detained for 30 days and, if deemed necessary, sent to reform institutions.
- The splitting of "Ice Island Alpha", an ice floe in the Arctic Ocean, stranded 21 members of the U.S. International Geophysical Year exploration team on a "drifting island" for four days without supplies. After delays for bad weather, a U.S. Air Force C-123 cargo plane sent from the Thule Air Base in Greenland rescued the group.
- Pakistan's former president, Iskander Mirza, went into exile six days after he was forced to resign in favor of General Mohammed Ayub Khan. Mirza and his wife boarded a KLM Royal Dutch Airlines flight at the airport in Karachi and moved to the United Kingdom, where he would receive two pensions.
- Died: Jean Couzy, 35, French mountaineer, was killed when he was struck on the head in a rock fall while climbing in the Dévoluy Mountains in the French Alps.

== November 3, 1958 (Monday) ==
- The new UNESCO building, World Heritage Centre, was inaugurated in Paris.
- Former Cuban Prime Minister Andrés Rivero Agüero, the nominee of President Fulgencio Batista's Progressive Action Party, was elected President of Cuba with more than 70 percent of the popular vote. Rivero, scheduled to be inaugurated on February 24, 1959, would never take office, and would flee Cuba along with Batista on January 1 in advance of Fidel Castro's march into Havana during the Cuban Revolution.
- Jorge Alessandri was sworn in as President of Chile for a six-year term. Because of Chile's economic crisis, "all unnecessary pomp was omitted in the inaugural ceremonies", and Alessandri opened his new home at La Moneda, the presidential palace in Santiago, to the public for three hours.
- The initial contingent of military service aeromedical personnel reported for duty and began working on human factors, crew selection, and crew training plans for the U.S. crewed spacecraft program.
- Died: Harry Revel, 52, British-born American song composer, died of a cerebral hemorrhage.

== November 4, 1958 (Tuesday) ==
- Iraqi Army Colonel Abdul Salam Arif, who had led the bloody coup d'état on July 14 that had included the assassination of the King, the royal family and the prime minister, was arrested in Baghdad on orders of Premier Abd al-Karim Qasim.
- The coronation of Pope John XXIII took place in Rome after his throne was carried into St. Peter's Basilica.
- In midterm elections in the United States, the Democratic Party fell slightly short of a two-thirds majority in Congress. The Democrats, led by Senate Majority Leader Lyndon Johnson, gained 13 seats and increased their 49 to 47 lead to a 62 to 34 majority in the Senate. The elections were the last for a 48-state United States. Led by Speaker of the House Sam Rayburn, the Democrats increased a 234–201 lead to a 283 to 153 majority in the House of Representatives.
- The CBS television network in the U.S. announced the immediate cancellation of its once-popular quiz show The $64,000 Question, which had last been shown on November 2. Vice President for TV programming Hubbell Robinson Jr. said in a statement, "Although the integrity of the first big quiz show was not an issue in the replacement, The $64,000 Question has nevertheless become a victim of declining quiz show audiences."
- Died: Sam Zimbalist, 53, Russian-born American film producer and editor, died of a heart attack in Rome during the production of Ben-Hur, which would win 11 Academy Awards.

== November 5, 1958 (Wednesday) ==
- In a drive-by shooting in Bonn, the capital of West Germany, French terrorists from the "Red Hand" group (La Main Rouge) fatally wounded Améziane Aït Ahcène, the chief representative from Algeria's rebel government-in-exile of the Front de Libération Nationale (FLN). Ahcène was driving to the Tunisian Embassy at Bad Godesberg when he was shot multiple times by machine gun fire from another car. He would survive for almost six months in a hospital in Tunisia until his death on April 24.
- The Space Task Group, unofficially established on October 8, 1958, was officially formed at Langley Field, Virginia, to implement a crewed satellite project. Robert R. Gilruth and Charles J. Donlan were appointed as Project Manager and Assistant Project Manager, respectively. Personnel transferred from the Langley Research Center to the Space Task Group included Gilruth, Donlan, Maxime A. Faget, Charles H. Zimmerman, and Christopher C. Kraft. Personnel detailed from the Lewis Research Center to the Space Task Group and Project Mercury included Glynn S. Lunney. Individuals from Lewis would remain on a detailed status until 1959 when they were permanently reassigned to the Space Task Group.
- Born:
  - Robert Patrick, American film and television actor known for the title role in the 1991 film Terminator 2: Judgment Day and for the CBS show Scorpion; in Marietta, Georgia
  - Eddie Pepitone, American actor and comedian; in Brooklyn, New York City

== November 6, 1958 (Thursday) ==
- Under the leadership of Dr. Maurice E. Müller, the AO Foundation was founded by a meeting of 13 orthopedic surgeons at the Elite Hotel in Biel, near Bern in Switzerland. The creation by the surgeons of the Arbeitsgemeinschaft für Osteosynthesefragen (the Association for Osteosynthesis), has been described as a "small gathering that would someday... cause a worldwide revolution in trauma care, and spawn a global industry for the manufacturing of the necessary implants and related surgical tools" for open reduction internal fixation to mend broken bones with screws and plates, intramedullary rods and other metallic devices.
- An 8.3 magnitude earthquake off of the coast of the Soviet island of Iturup and injured 51 people. "Significant Earthquake Information"

== November 7, 1958 (Friday) ==
- Albert Freedman, the producer of the U.S. television game show Twenty-One, became the first person to be arrested in connection with the TV quiz show scandals. He was indicted for perjury on charges of having knowingly lied under oath to a grand jury about supplying questions or answers to contestants on Twenty One.
- A contractor briefing, attended by some 40 prospective bidders on the crewed spacecraft, was held at the Langley Research Center. More detailed specifications were then prepared and distributed to about 20 manufacturers who had stated an intention to bid on the project.
- Spartak Plovdiv defeated Minyor Pernik before 20,000 fans in Sofia, 1 to 0, to win the Bulgarian Cup, the Eastern European nation's football cup tournament.
- Born:
  - Dmitry Kozak, Deputy Prime Minister of Russia 2008 to 2020, Deputy Chief of Staff for President Putin since 2020; in Bandurovo village, Ukrainian SSR, Soviet Union
  - Jeewan Kumaranatunga, Sri Lankan film and TV actor who later became a cabinet minister (for Lands & Land Development, then for Posts & Telecommunication) between 2007 and 2015; in Seeduwa, Ceylon

== November 8, 1958 (Saturday) ==
- The U.S. Air Force's third consecutive failure of a rocket to the Moon happened shortly after the 2:30 a.m. launch when the third stage of the four-stage rocket failed to ignite.
- Cuban Army intelligence officers and police raided an apartment in La Víbora, a suburb of Havana, and killed Angel Almejeira, the chief of militia of Fidel Castro's 26th of July Movement, along with two other rebels, in a gun battle.
- Born: Yoav Gallant, Israeli politician and military officer, Minister of Defense (2022-2024); in Tel Aviv
- Died: C. Ganesha Iyer, 80, Sri Lankan (Ceylonese) Tamil philologist

== November 9, 1958 (Sunday) ==
- All 36 people aboard an Aero-Topográfica (ARTOP) Martin PBM-5 Mariner disappeared and were presumed dead after the flying boat airplane experienced trouble during the Portuguese airliner's flight from Lisbon to Funchal while over the North Atlantic Ocean. The last transmission was an international Morse code distress signal, "QUG", meaning ""I am forced to land immediately."
- The wreckage of the B-24 Liberator bomber nicknamed Lady Be Good, was found in the Libyan Desert more than 15 years after it had crashed on April 4, 1943. An oil exploration team from the British Petroleum company had accidentally discovered the airplane debris. The remains of the crew, who had bailed out from the airplane and then died of thirst days later, would not be found until 1960.

== November 10, 1958 (Monday) ==
- Soviet Premier Nikita Khrushchev said in a speech in Moscow that the Potsdam Agreement of 1945, which had provided for control of Berlin by the U.S., the UK, France and the U.S.S.R. after World War II, was "out of date" and accused the three western powers of consistently violating the agreement, thereby having "abolished the legal basis on which their stay in Berlin rested." The statement would be followed days later by an ultimatum giving the three NATO members six months to withdraw from West Berlin.
- Former Iraqi Premier Muhammad Fadhel al-Jamali, former Armed Forces Chief of Staff Rafiq Arif and former Deputy Chief of Staff Ghazi Mohammed Daghistani, were all sentenced to death by a five-man military tribunal in Baghdad. All three had served under King Faisal II and Prime Minister Nuri as-Said, and would be released in 1960.
- The bossa nova was born in Rio de Janeiro, with João Gilberto's recording of Chega de Saudade.

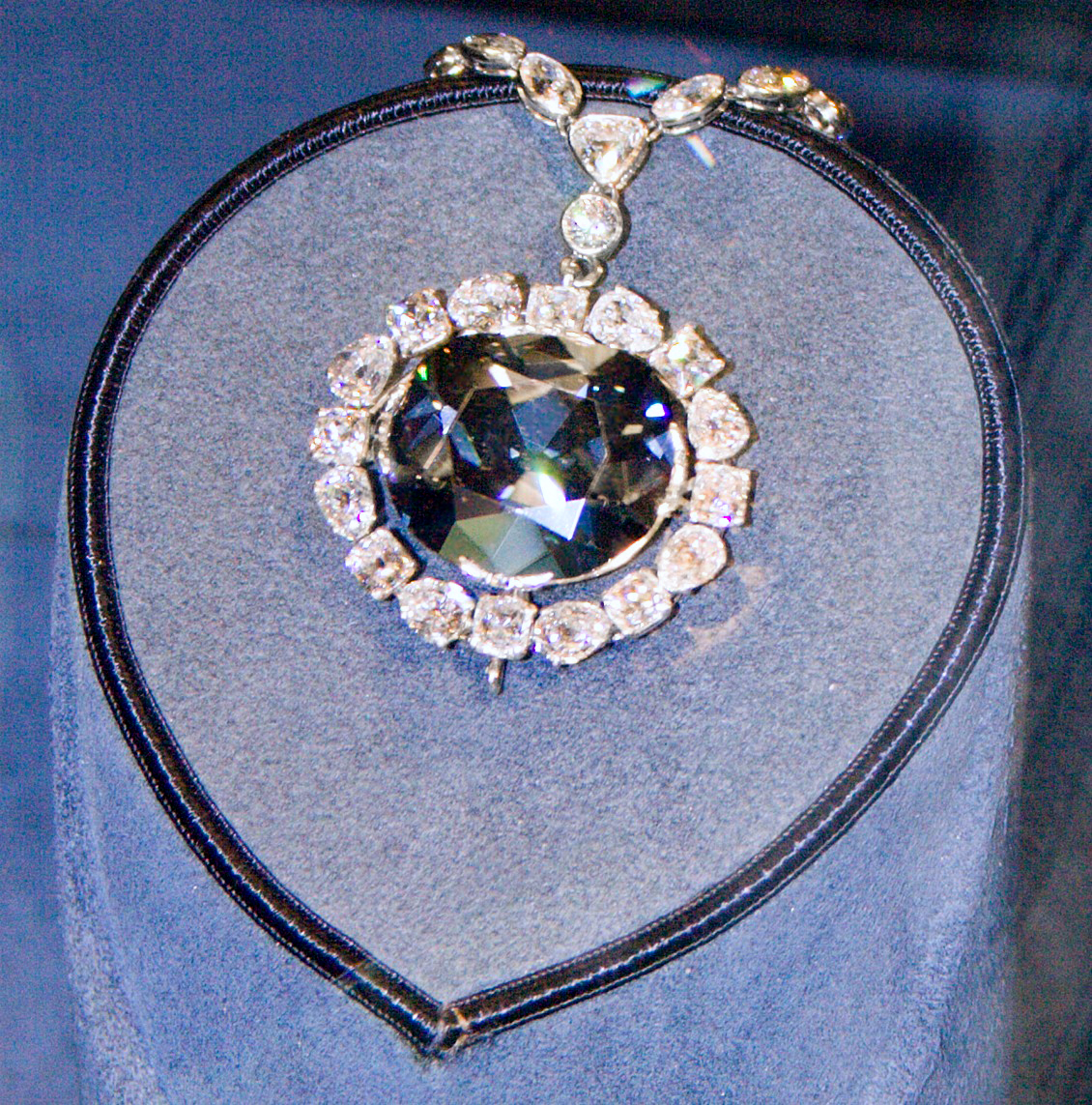
The Diamond

- Harry Winston donated the Hope Diamond to the Smithsonian Institution. His jewelry dealership, "Harry Winston, Inc.", had purchased the allegedly cursed gem from the estate of Evalyn Walsh McLean in 1949, sent it by mail from New York on November 8, and a presentation ceremony was made two days later. While the Hope Diamond had a reputation for being followed by tragedy to its owners over 300 years, including Mrs. McLean, a reporter noted that "As far as Mr. Winston could make out, it has brought him no bad luck. And as of Monday, if anyone it is hexed, it will not be he, but the staff of the Smithsonian Institution."

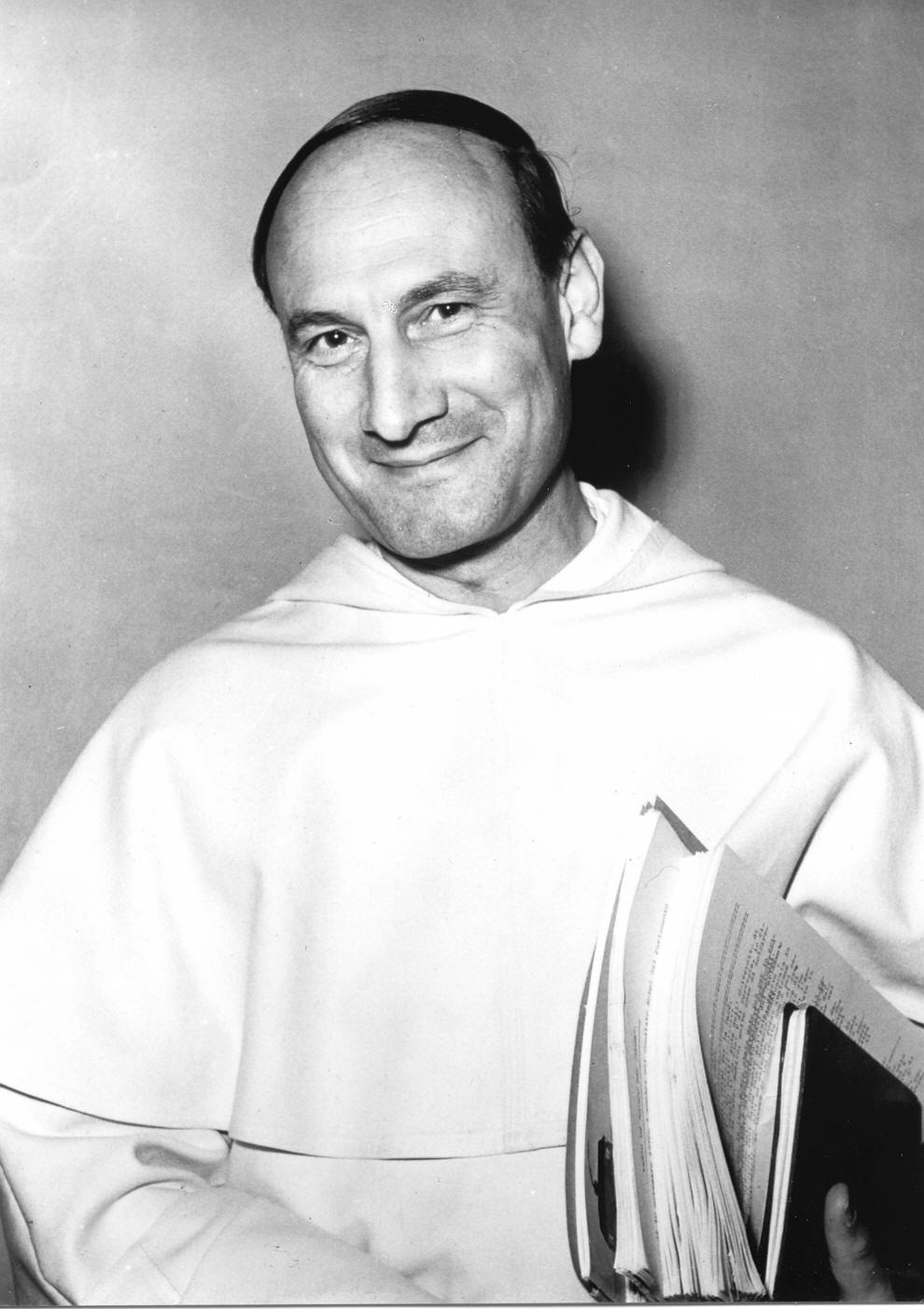
Friar Pire

- The Nobel Peace Prize was awarded to Dominique Pire, a Belgian Dominican friar who had helped thousands of displaced persons and refugees after World War II.

== November 11, 1958 (Tuesday) ==
- The first bone marrow transplant to a human recipient from an unrelated donor was performed in Paris by Dr. Georges Mathé, a French oncologist and surgeon. Frenchman Marcel Pabion volunteered for a graft of his bone marrow to Yugoslavian engineer Radojko Maksić, who had been irradiated in a nuclear accident at the Vinča Nuclear Institute on October 15. Maksić and four other patients would recover from being irradiated, while a sixth one failed to survive.
- Argentina's President Arturo Frondizi imposed a 30-day state of siege and the suspension of constitutional rights in the South American republic, using his powers under Article 23 of the Constitution for internal disorder. More than 700 Peronists, Communists and Nationalists were arrested. Vice President Alejandro Gómez was accused the next day of plotting Frondizi's overthrow with members of the armed forces and opposition political leaders. Gomez initially refused calls to quit, then resigned on November 18 after a confrontation in his office by an angry mob.
- The supernatural comedy romance film Bell, Book and Candle premiered in Los Angeles at the Warner Beverly Theatre, with Jimmy Stewart and Kim Novak. Based on a 1950 Broadway play, the film about a witch and the victim of a love spell, would later be cited by TV producer Sol Saks as one of two inspirations for the sitcom Bewitched.
- Born:
  - Kathy Lette, Australian-born British novelist; in Sydney
  - Scott Plank, American TV and film actor; in Washington, D.C. (d. 2002 from auto accident injuries)
- Died: André Bazin, 40, French film critic, died of leukemia.

== November 12, 1958 (Wednesday) ==
- Elections were held in the Federation of Rhodesia and Nyasaland for 52 of the 59 seats of the Federal Parliament. The seats were apportioned as 24 for Southern Rhodesia (now Zimbabwe), 14 for Northern Rhodesia (now Zambia) and 6 for Nyasaland (now Malawi). Almost 95 percent of the eligible voters— 83,643 out of 88,314— were white Europeans. Prime Minister Roy Welensky's United Federal Party won 46 of the 59 seats.
- Three mountain climbers became the first persons to climb to the top of "El Capitan", a 3,000-foot (910 m) tall vertical rock formation in the U.S. at the Yosemite National Park in California. Warren Harding, George Whitmore and Wayne Merry worked for 47 days in scaling the natural rock wall.
- Born:
  - Megan Mullally, Emmy Award-winning comedian and television actress known for Will & Grace; in Los Angeles
  - Hiromi Iwasaki, popular Japanese singer in the 1970s and early 1980s; in Kōtō ward of Tokyo
  - David Francis, Australian novelist and lawyer; in Mornington, Victoria
- Died: James M. Curley, U.S. politician who served as mayor and political boss of Boston, as well as Governor of Massachusetts and U.S. Representative.

== November 13, 1958 (Thursday) ==
- Soviet Premier Nikita Khrushchev announced an ambitious seven year plan to increase industrial production in the Soviet Union by 80% by the end of the year 1965, including a goal of having more than half of the world's industrial output be produced by the Communist nations. Khrushchev presented the plan before the Central Committee of the Soviet Communist Party the day before, for adoption at the Party Congress in 1959.
- William A. Shea, a New York City lawyer who was chairman of a committee organized by Mayor Robert F. Wagner Jr. to bring a new National League baseball franchise to the city, announced plans to organize a third major league to compete against the established National League and American League. Shea said in a press conference that the city would be prepared to build a new stadium for the league's New York team, and that the plan, for what would later be promoted as the Continental League, had become necessary because Shea had "become convinced the National League has no intention at this time of expanding into a ten-club circuit."
- The first computerized wargaming system in the United States, the Naval Electronic Warfare Simulator, was installed by Vice Admiral Stuart H. Ingersoll, president of the Naval War College in Newport, Rhode Island.

== November 14, 1958 (Friday) ==
- Spyridon Abou Rjaileh of Lebanon, referred to as the Metropolitan Theodosius, was elected as the new Greek Orthodox Patriarch of Antioch, the most prominent position in the Greek Orthodox Church, Theodosius VI, as successor to the late Patriarch Alexander III.
- Rear Admiral Wolfgang Larrazábal resigned as President of Venezuela and announced that he would run as a candidate in the December 7 presidential election. Larrazábal, the South American nation's head of state as chairman of the five-member military junta that had overthrown president Marcos Pérez Jiménez January 23, was succeeded by another member of the junta, Dr. Edgar Sanabria.
- Specifications for the American crewed spacecraft were issued, and final copies would be mailed on November 17, 1958, to 20 firms which had indicated a desire to be considered as bidders. NASA set the deadline for proposal submission as December 11, 1958.
- Born: Sergio Goyri, Mexican television actor on multiple soap operas; in Puebla

== November 15, 1958 (Saturday) ==
- In the west African Dominion of Ghana, 43 people were indicted on charges of being members of the underground terrorist organization "Zenith 7" and of plotting to poison Prime Minister Kwame Nkrumah and officials of his ruling Convention People's Party.

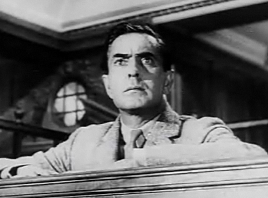
Power

- Died: Tyrone Power, 44, popular American film actor, died of a massive heart attack while filming an action scene for the movie Solomon and Sheba in Spain, where he had been cast in the lead role as Solomon. Filming was two-thirds complete when Power died, and the part was recast the next day with Yul Brynner for re-filming of Power's scenes.

== November 16, 1958 (Sunday) ==
- A yes/no vote was held in Hungary for the 338-member Országgyűlés. The only legal political party in the Communist nation, the Hungarian Working People's Party of First Secretary Janos Kadar, presented a slate of candidates for voter approval. Polling stations were unpatrolled and voters had the option of crossing off the names of candidates whom they wished to express their opinion of disapproval. In some districts, unofficial nominees were listed on the ballot.
- Elections for the 400 seat Volkskammer, Communist East Germany's parliament, were held as a yes/no election for the slate of candidates for the National Front, but did not include East Berlin, the Soviet sector of the divided city of Berlin, who voted only for city council members.
- Born:
  - Sooronbay Jeenbekov, President of Kyrgyzstan 2017 to 2020; in Biy-Myrza, Kirghiz SSR, Soviet Union
  - Marg Helgenberger, American TV actress known for CSI: Crime Scene Investigation, China Beach and Ryan's Hope; in Fremont, Nebraska
- Died:
  - Samuel Hopkins Adams, 87, American investigative journalist and a novelist
  - Ronald Squire, 72, stage and film comedian and character actor

== November 17, 1958 (Monday) ==
- "The Chipmunk Song", subtitled "Christmas Don't Be Late", was released as a single 45 rpm recording by Liberty Records and introduced the popular "Alvin and the Chipmunks" franchise. Comedian Ross Bagdasarian (who had earlier had a hit with the song "Witch Doctor") recorded the voices of his alter ego, David Seville, and, at high speed, of Alvin, Simon and Theodore. "The Chipmunk Song" would reach No. 1 on the "Billboard" magazine's Hot 100.
- On the day that the National Legislature was to convene in the Republic of the Sudan, General Ibrahim Abboud led a coup d'état at the request of Prime Minister Abdallah Khalil. General Abboud declared himself President of the Sudan and President the next day, while Khalil became the Minister of Defense.
- Pope John XXIII added 23 new Roman Catholic clerics to the College of Cardinals, increasing the number from 52 to 75 and breaking the 1586 decree by Pope Sixtus V that the maximum number of cardinals would always be 70.
- Born: Mary Elizabeth Mastrantonio, American stage and film actress known for Man of La Mancha and The Color of Money; in Lombard, Illinois
- Died: Yutaka Taniyama, 31, Japanese mathematician known for the Taniyama–Shimura conjecture, committed suicide in Tokyo.

== November 18, 1958 (Tuesday) ==
- Thirty-three of the 35 crew of the lake freighter SS Carl D. Bradley died when it broke up and sank in a storm on Lake Michigan. The night before, after having made its final scheduled delivery of the season (a cargo of crushed stone at Gary, Indiana), the ship had been on its way to Manitowoc, Wisconsin, where it would have been placed in dry dock. Hours before it reached Manitowoc, the ship received an order from U.S. Steel to travel to Rogers City, Michigan for a last-minute order of limestone. At 5:35 in the afternoon, southwest of Michigan's Gull Island, while sailing in a storm, the ship exploded and broke in two. Neither of the two lifeboats on the stern half of the boat could be lowered to evacuate the 15 sailors who reached the stern side of the deck, and only four crew members were able to reach the life raft on the bow side. Of the four who got on the raft, two were thrown off into the sea by massive waves.
- Born:
  - Oscar Nunez, Cuban-born American TV actor known for NBC's The Office; in Colón, Matanzas Province
  - Evelyn Cisneros-Legate, American dancer and prima ballerina for the San Francisco Ballet 1977–2000, known for being the first prima ballerina in the U.S. of Hispanic heritage; in Long Beach, California

== November 19, 1958 (Wednesday) ==
- The U.S. Department of Defense began the process of reducing the size of the 2.6-million member U.S. armed forces, trimming the 70,000 jobs over the course of seven months and reducing the quota for the draft call from 11,000 per month to 9,000 starting in January.
- Kyriakos Matsis, the commander of the Greek Cypriot terrorist group EOKA, was killed by British Army security forces after being tracked to a hideout in Dikomo in the predominantly Turkish Cypriot part of the island in northern Cyprus. Matsis, being hunted for the November 8 killing by EOKA of two British soldiers, ordered his two EOKA comrades to give themselves up. After he refused to surrender and shouted "I'll come out firing!", the British tossed two grenades into the house and killed him instantly.
- Born: Charlie Kaufman, American filmmaker and novelist known for Being John Malkovich and for Eternal Sunshine of the Spotless Mind; in New York City
- Died: General Vittorio Ambrosio, 79, former Chief of Staff of the Italian Armed Forces in 1943

== November 20, 1958 (Thursday) ==
- In one of the decisive battles of the Cuban Revolution, the guerrillas of the 26th of July Movement defeated the Cuban Army in the Battle of Guisa.
- Governor J. Lindsay Almond of the U.S. state of Virginia, whose state was engaged in a dispute with the U.S. government over racial segregation of the state's schools, ordered that the American flag be hauled down from the lone flagpole on the state Capitol building in Richmond, and that the flag of Virginia be run up in its place. Almond told reporters that he had made the decision "because this is the Commonwealth of Virginia and I want the Virginia flag to fly from this Capitol," and added that with only one pole, he would not permit the usual custom of having the Virginia banner be displayed beneath the U.S. flag.
- Puppeteers Jim Henson and Jane Henson incorporated The Jim Henson Company as Muppets, Inc. in the United States, initially to market the characters seen on the Hensons' television series Sam and Friends on WRC-TV in Washington, D.C.
- James Haslam Jr. opened the first gas station of the Pilot Corporation's U.S. chain of "travel centers" (filling station, truck stop and convenience stores) in Weber City, Virginia.
- The three United States military services were invited to send one person each to the Space Task Group to perform liaison duties for the crewed spacecraft project. These posts would be filled in January 1959 by Lt. Colonel Martin Raines, U.S. Army; Lt. Colonel Keith Lindell, U.S. Air Force; and Commander Paul Havenstein, U.S. Navy.

== November 21, 1958 (Friday) ==
- The Universidad de Oriente Venezuela was founded by Decree Law No. 459, to serve students in eastern Venezuela. The first classes would be held on February 12, 1959, in Cumaná in the state of Sucre, with 113 students enrolled.
- In East Pakistan, Khwaja Hassan Askari became the sixth and final Nawab of Dhaka, the East Pakistani (and later Bangladesh) capital, upon the death of his father, Khwaja Habibullah Bahadur.
- Caril Ann Fugate, a Nebraska teenager who had helped her boyfriend Charles Starkweather with 11 murders, was sentenced to life imprisonment. She would be paroled on June 20, 1976, after 18 years of incarceration.
- Born: Ian Cognito (stage name for Paul Barbieri), English stand-up comedian; in London (d. 2019)
- Died:
  - Mel Ott, 49, former U.S. major league baseball star and inductee to the National Baseball Hall of Fame, died of injuries from a November 14 automobile accident.
  - Janie Brady Jones, 92, widow of the railroad engineer referred to in "The Ballad of Casey Jones". Mrs. Jones, who was portrayed unfairly in the song's last verse as "Mrs. Casey" who told her children "you got another papa on the Salt Lake Line", outlived her husband by almost 60 years after he was killed on April 30, 1900.

== November 22, 1958 (Saturday) ==
- Voting in Australia took place for the 122-member House of Representatives and half the 60-member Australian Senate. The campaign was the first where television was used by the candidates. The coalition government of the Liberal Party and the Country Party, headed by Prime Minister Robert Menzies, gained two of the seats of the Australian Labor Party, led by H.V. Evatt, increasing its majority 77 to 45 in the House. The coalition also won a 32 to 26 majority in the Senate, after having 30 seats against 30 for the other parties combined.
- Dashiin Damba was ousted from his position as First Secretary of the ruling Mongolian People's Revolutionary Party and the de facto leader of Communist-ruled Mongolia by the Central Committee, and replaced by Prime Minister Yumjaagiin Tsedenbal, who had disagreed with Damba's plans for "de-Stalinization".
- Born:
  - Jamie Lee Curtis, American film and television actress, as the daughter of Tony Curtis and Janet Leigh; in Santa Monica, California
  - Sultan Ibrahim Ismail, monarch of the Malaysian state of Johor since 2010; in Johor Bahru, Federation of Malaya

== November 23, 1958 (Sunday) ==
- The opening round of voting began in France as 2,978 candidates vied for the 465 National Assembly seats in the first elections under the new Fifth Republic constitution. Only 39 of the 465 races were decided in the first round, which required a candidate to win more than 50% of the vote.
- The leaders of the nations of Ghana and Guinea, announced in Accra that they had signed an agreement to unite in a confederacy that would be the "nucleus of a union of West African states, subject to ratification by both nations' national assemblies.

== November 24, 1958 (Monday) ==
- The African colony of the French Sudan was made an autonomous state, the Sudanese Republic, a self-governing member of the French Community, a prelude to independence. After briefly joining with Senegal to become independent as the Mali Federation on June 20, 1960, it would separate and become the Republic of Mali on September 22, 1960.
- The CBS TV anthology Desilu Playhouse presented "The Time Element", the teleplay by Rod Serling that would lead to the American network's decision to broadcast a weekly series of Serling's productions, the classic science fiction show The Twilight Zone. The program starred William Bendix in a psychological thriller.
- The Space Task Group placed an order for one Atlas launch vehicle with the Air Force Missile Division, Inglewood, California, as part of a preliminary research program leading to human spaceflight. The National Aeronautics and Space Administration Headquarters requested that the Air Force construct and launch one Atlas C launch vehicle to check the aerodynamics of the spacecraft. It was the intention to launch this missile about May 1959 in a ballistic trajectory. This was to be the launch vehicle for the Big Joe reentry test shot, but plans were later changed, and an Atlas Model D launch vehicle was used instead.
- Born: Alex Kozulin, Ukrainian entertainer; in Novoselytsia, Ukrainian SSR, Soviet Union
- Died:
  - Viscount Cecil of Chelwood, 94, British diplomat and co-creator of the League of Nations, and recipient of the Nobel Peace Prize in 1937, died of injuries sustained in a fall at his home.
  - Parkyakarkus (stage name for Harry Einstein), American comedian who was famous on radio and on film in the role of the Greek chef "Nick Parkyakarkus" (a play on words of the phrase "park your carcass"), died at 1:20 in the morning, hours after collapsing following a performance at the Friars Club banquet in Beverly Hills, California, for Lucille Ball and Desi Arnaz.

== November 25, 1958 (Tuesday) ==
- Voting was held across the U.S. Territory of Alaska for its first state officials, in advance of its admission as the 49th state on January 3, 1959. Democrat William A. Egan, a native of Valdez, Alaska, overwhelmingly defeated John Butrovich (of Fairbanks) in the race for Governor of Alaska, and the first state legislature (the 20-member Alaska Senate and 40-member Alaska House of Representatives) was selected, in addition to the two U.S. Senators (Bob Bartlett and Ernest Gruening) and the lone U.S. Representative at-large (Ralph Rivers).
- The African colony of the Senegal was made an autonomous republic as a self-governing member of the French Community, a prelude to full independence in 1960.
- Died:
  - Charles F. Kettering, 82, American inventor with 186 patents for items such as the electric starter for automobiles, Freon refrigerant, and tetraethyllead, the component of leaded gasoline.
  - Irene Lisboa, 65, Portuguese novelist

== November 26, 1958 (Wednesday) ==
- The U.S. crewed satellite program was officially designated Project Mercury.
- Space Task Group personnel presented a proposed program for Langley Research Center support in the Little Joe phase of Project Mercury. Langley was favorably inclined, and after a survey of manpower and facility availability, notified Space Task Group on December 5, 1958, of its willingness to support the program. Langley tasks involved contracting for engineering, construction, services, data processing, analysis, and reporting research results.
- At Chennault Air Force Base, near Lake Charles, Louisiana, a USAF B-47 bomber with a nuclear weapon on board developed a fire while on the ground. The aircraft wreckage and the site of the accident were contaminated after a limited explosion of non-nuclear material. The fire, which killed the pilot and injured the navigator, started when a rocket-assist takeoff device exploded while the plane was parked and awaiting takeoff.

== November 27, 1958 (Thursday) ==
- Soviet leader Nikita Khrushchev delivered an ultimatum to the United States, the United Kingdom and France, demanding that the Western nations' troops be withdrawn from West Berlin within six months, after which the Soviets would turn administration of the city, including control over the access corridors used between West Germany and West Berlin, to control of the East German government. John Foster Dulles, the U.S. Secretary of State, responded "We are not afraid of May 27, 1959." Ironically, Dulles would be buried at Arlington National Cemetery on May 27, 1959, three days after his May 24 death from cancer.
- The engagement of Japan's Crown Prince Akihito to a commoner, Michiko Shoda, was announced after being approved by the Imperial Household Council. Akihito and Michiko would be married on April 10, 1959.
- Born:
  - Tetsuya Komuro, Japanese songwriter and music producer; in Fuchū, Tokyo
  - Paul Gosar, right-wing U.S. Congressman for Arizona since 2011; in Rock Springs, Wyoming
- Died:
  - Georgi Damyanov, 66, head of state of Bulgaria since 1950 as Chairman of the Presidium of the National Assembly
  - Artur Rodziński, 66, Polish-born American music conductor, died of exhaustion 11 days after completion of the Lyric Opera of Chicago performances of Tristan und Isolde

== November 28, 1958 (Friday) ==
- The French African colonies of Chad, the Republic of the Congo, and Gabon were all granted autonomous republic status as members of the French Community. All three would attain full independence in 1960.
- The United States made its first full-range firing of an intercontinental ballistic missile (ICBM), launching an unarmed SM-65 Atlas rocket from Cape Canaveral in Florida. The missile reached its target, 6,325 miles (10,179 km) to the southeast near Ascension Island in the South Atlantic Ocean, half an hour later. The Atlas brought the U.S. into parity with the Soviet Union, which had successfully tested the R-7 Semyorka starting in 1957.

== November 29, 1958 (Saturday) ==
- The government of Argentina ended a nationwide strike of railway workers as the South American republic's army arrested 1,000 employees of the state-owned Ferrocarriles Argentinos. Using emergency authority assumed on November 11, President Arturo Frondizi had issued a decree on November 27 to induct all striking employees into the armed forces. The arrests made were for who failing to report for the draft.
- The Grey Cup, the championship of Canadian professional football, was played as the Canadian Football League for the first time, taking place in Vancouver's Empire Stadium before a crowd of 34,426. The Winnipeg Blue Bombers defeated the Hamilton Tiger-Cats 35–28.
- Born:
  - Sean Bobbitt, American-born British cinematographer; in Corpus Christi, Texas
  - Orup (stage name for Hans Thomas Eriksson), Swedish pop singer; in Huddinge Municipality
  - Elizabeth Storm, American soap opera actress
  - Maria Elena Moyano, black Peruvian feminist and anti-poverty activist who was assassinated by the Peruvian terrorist group Shining Path; in the Santiago de Surco district of Lima (d. 1992)

== November 30, 1958 (Sunday) ==
- The National Assembly elections, first for the Fifth Republic of France, were completed, and the candidates of Prime Minister Charles de Gaulle's right-wing Union pour la nouvelle République (UNR) had 189 of the 465 seats (40.7%), after having had only 22 in 1956. The French Communist Party of Maurice Thorez, which had the highest number of seats (150) before the election, lost 140 of them to end up with only 10. With only 39 seats of the 465 seats for France itself being filled on November 23 by a candidate who received a majority of the votes, there were 1,332 candidates in the second round of voting for the remaining 426 seats. Six former prime ministers of France lost their seats in the Assembly— Édouard Daladier (1938-1940); Paul Ramadier (1947); Joseph Laniel (1953-1954); Pierre Mendès France (1954-1955); Edgar Faure (1955-1956); and Maurice Bourgès-Maunoury (1957).
- Voting took place for the Chamber of Deputies and the Senate in the South American nation of Uruguay. The Partido Blanco (the "White Party", nickname for the Partido Nacional) won 51 of the 99 seats in the Chamber and 17 of the 31 Senate seats, ending 93 yars of rule by the Partido Colorado (literally, the "Red Party"), which won 38 and 12 seats in the House and Senate respectively. Voters overwhelmingly rejected a proposed change of the Uruguayan constitution.
- British actor Gareth Jones, died during the live performance of the play Underground on television, although his death took place off camera while a make-up artist was preparing him for the next scene. Ironically, the 33-year-old actor was portraying the role of a man with a weak heart in the drama about people trapped in the rubble of a subway tunnel. Gareth performed his role as "Carl Norman" in the first of two scenes on the presentation on ITV's Armchair Theatre, complained of not feeling well when he walked off stage. When it was clear that he was not going to be coming back, the other actors ad-libbed his scene, including delivering some of the lines that Jones would have spoken.
- Born: Juliette Bergmann, Netherlands female body builder, winner of Ms. Olympia title in 2001, 2002 and 2003, and professional world championship of the International Federation of BodyBuilders in 1986; in Vlaardingen
- Died:
  - Sir Hubert Wilkins, 70, Australian-born U.S. polar explorer. He was found dead the next day in his hotel room in Framingham, Massachusetts.
  - Ernest Simpson, American-born British shipping magnate whose wife, Mrs. Wallis Warfield Simpson, left him in 1936 for King Edward VIII of the United Kingdom, with the eventual result being the abdication of the King.
