= December 1958 =

Month of 1958

<<	December 1958					>>
Su	Mo	Tu	We	Th	Fr	Sa
	1	2	3	4	5	6
7	8	9	10	11	12	13
14	15	16	17	18	19	20
21	22	23	24	25	26	27
28	29	30	31

December 5, 1958: Britain opens its first four-lane Motorway

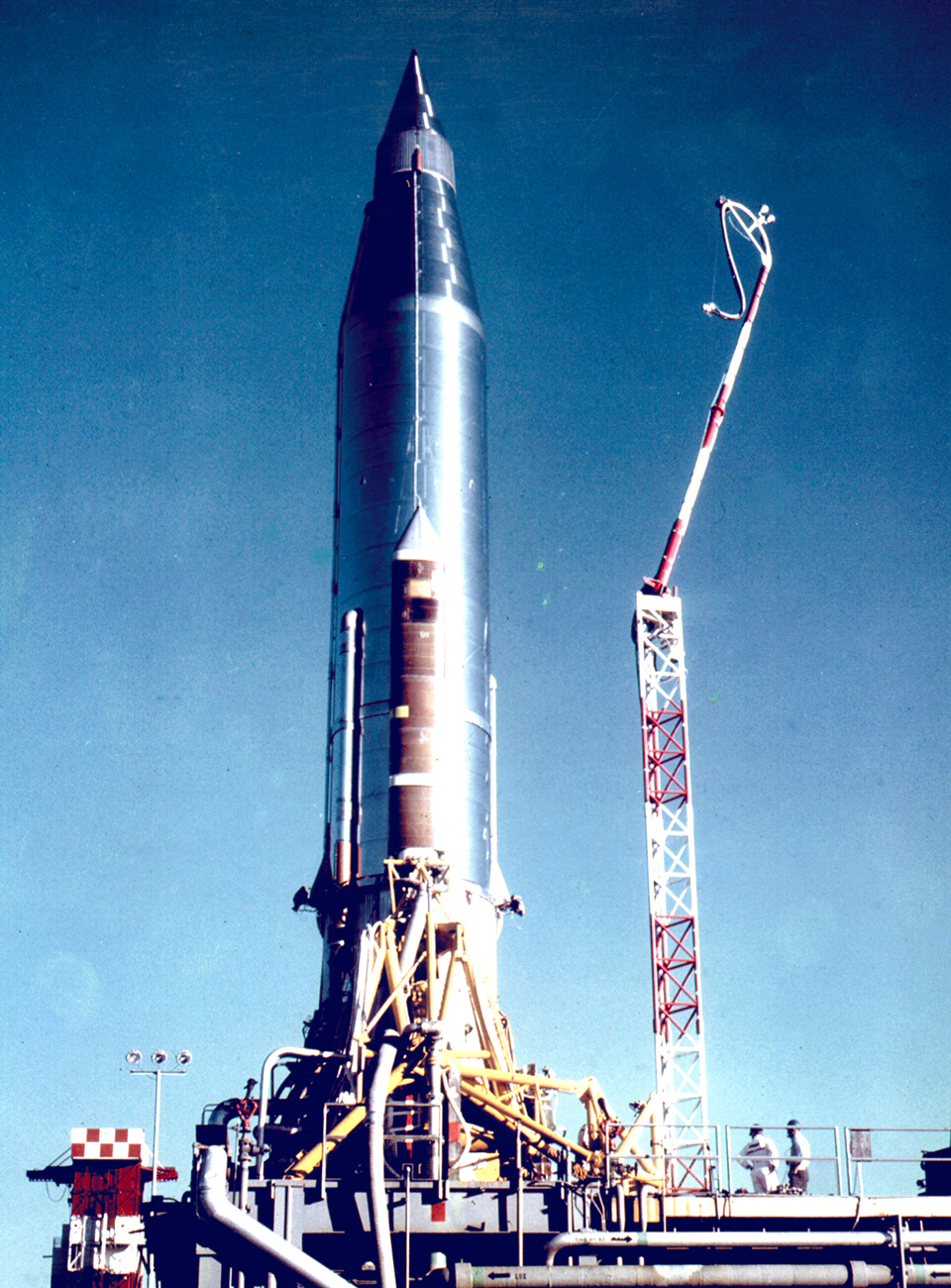
December 18, 1958: U.S. launches SCORE, the first communications satellite

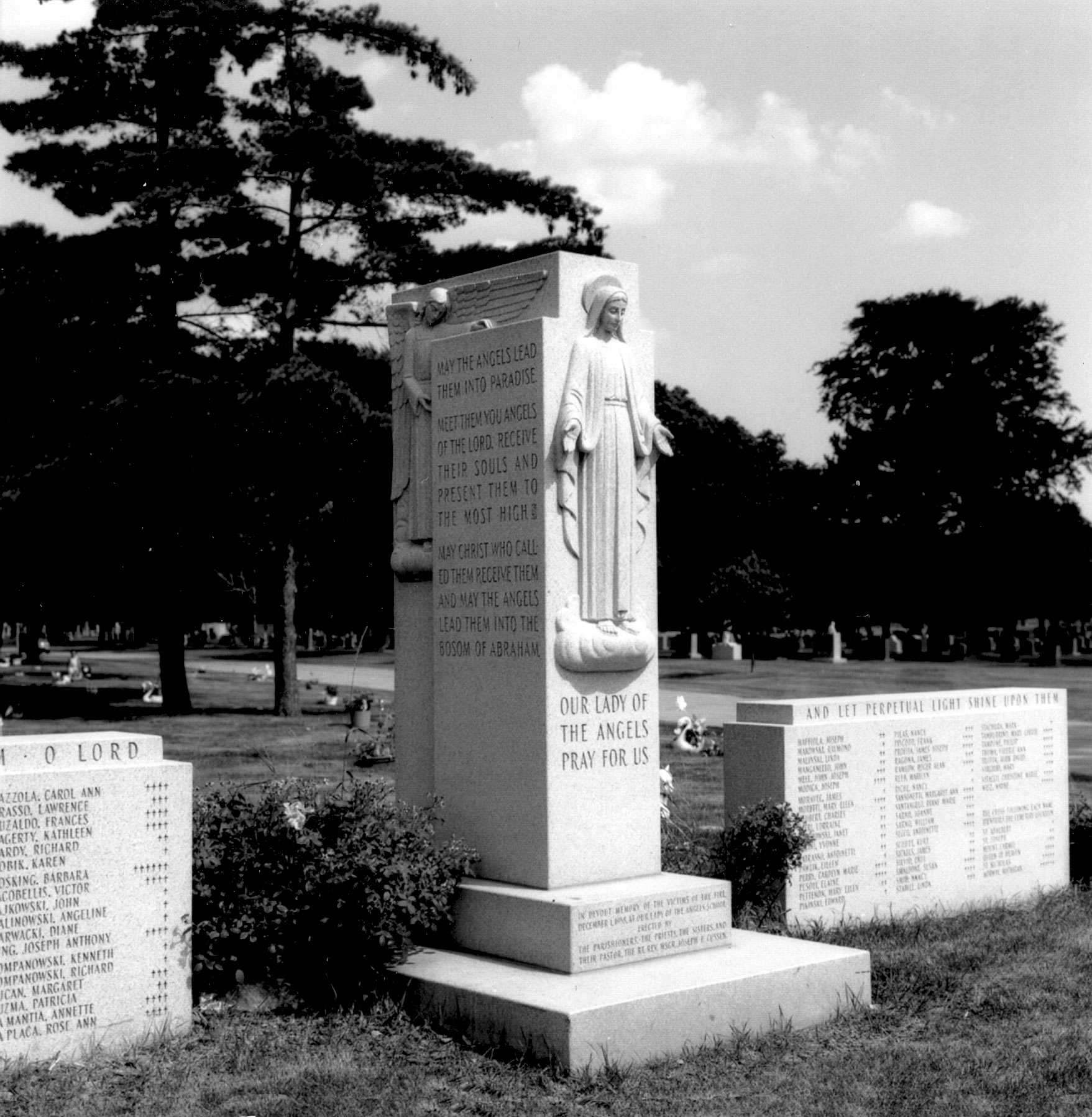
December 1, 1958: Fire kills 90 schoolchildren in Chicago

The following events occurred in December 1958:

== December 1, 1958 (Monday) ==
- A fire killed 92 students and three teachers at the Our Lady of the Angels parochial school in Chicago. The fire started in a cardboard trash barrel in a stairway, 40 minutes before classes were to end for the day. Because the school was filled with combustible materials and fire doors and alarms were inadequate, the fire spread quickly on the building's second floor. Most of the students (78) who died had been in three classrooms -- 210, 211 and 212. The fire resulted in numerous reforms in fire prevention in schools.
- The government of the Republic of Iraq announced that it was withdrawing from circulation all coins and banknotes that still had portraits of King Faisal II, who had been assassinated in a coup d'état in July, with the currency to be worthless after the time for exchanging for new currency and coinage expired.
- Martial law came to an end in the Kingdom of Jordan after 19 months.
- Mrika, composed and written by Prenk Jakova as the first Albanian-language opera, premiered in Tirana at the Migjeni Theatre. Dashnor Kaloçi,
- The French colony of Ubangi-Shari received partial self-government within the French Community as France declared the Central African Republic. France still administered the semi-independent nation's foreign and defense affairs in preparation for the republic's full independence in 1960. Barthélemy Boganda served as the first Prime Minister of the Central African Republic and was expected to become its first President but would die in a plane crash on March 29, 1959.
- Design of the Big Joe spacecraft for the Project Mercury reentry test (the spacecraft would be boosted by an Atlas launch vehicle over a ballistic trajectory) was accomplished by the Space Task Group. Construction of the spacecraft was assigned as a joint task of the Langley and Lewis Research Centers under the direction of the Space Task Group. The instrument package was developed by Lewis personnel assigned to the Space Task Group, and these individuals later became the nucleus of the Space Task Group's Flight Operations Division at Cape Canaveral.
- The LSU Tigers, at 10–0 the only unbeaten and untied major college football team in the nation, finished ahead of the 7–1–1 Iowa Hawkeyes for the number one ranking in the United Press International poll of its board of 34 college football coaches, and win the national championship for the 1958 college football season.
- Adolfo López Mateos was sworn in as the new President of Mexico.
- Born:
  - Javier Aguirre, Mexican soccer football midfielder with 59 caps for the Mexico national team, later the manager of the national teams of Mexico (2001-2002), Japan (2014-2015) and Egypt (2018-2019); in Mexico City
  - Yanko Rusev, Bulgarian weightlifter and 1980 Olympic gold medalist; in Ivanki
  - Belal Shafiul Huq, Chief of Staff of the Bangladesh Army from 2015 to 2018; in Noakhali District
  - Charlene Tilton, American TV actress known for Dallas
- Died:
  - Thomas Orde-Lees, 81, German-born British Antarctic explorer

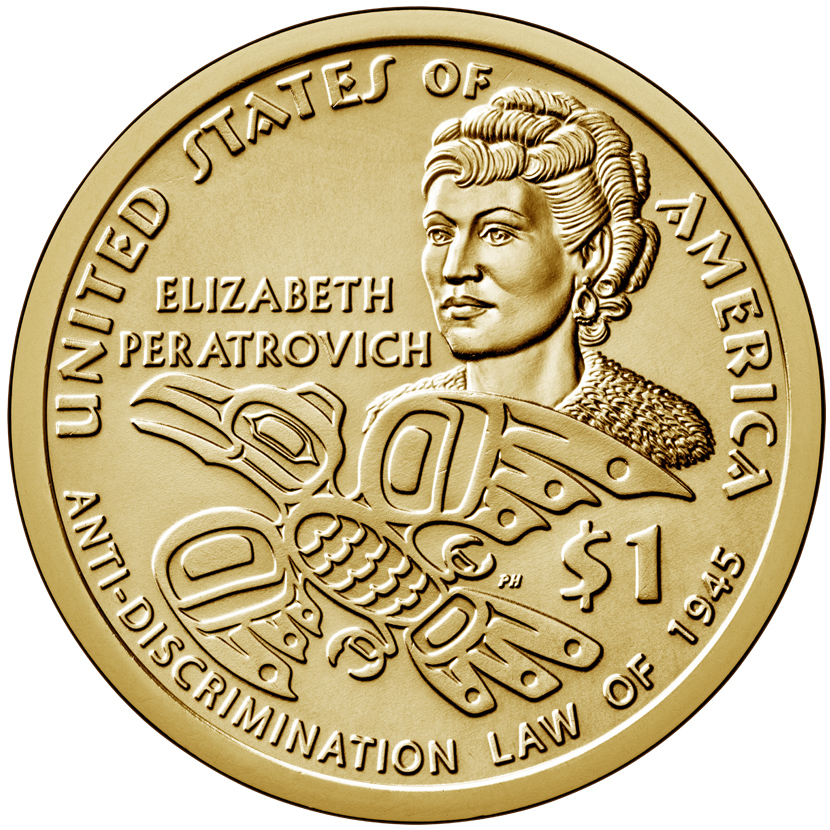
The U.S. dollar coin in honor of Peratrovich

  - Elizabeth Peratrovich, 47, American Tlingit civil rights activist for indigenous Alaskans, and founder of the Alaska Native Sisterhood who was instrumental in the passage of the Alaska Equal Rights Act of 1945, died of breast cancer.

== December 2, 1958 (Tuesday) ==
- The completion of the Kariba Dam closed off the Zambezi River, creating the world's largest artificial lake and reservoir by volume, Lake Kariba. Four years and four months later, the lake was filled to sufficient capacity to make a hydroelectric plant operable.
- In Ireland's County Kildare, 15 prisoners successfully escaped Curragh Camp out of 26 who made the attempt. The moment came during a soccer football game outside the prison building. The leaders managed to use "improvised wire-cutters" to break through the three fences that encircled the prison, but some were stopped by "aimed leg-shots by the guard and the blinding flash effect of ammonia grenades", as well as the setting afire of bushes that would have been used as hiding places. Two were unable to cross the final barrier, a "substantial ditch", because of injuries, and two more were recaptured after an extensive search.
- Space Task Group officials visited the Army Ballistic Missile Agency to determine the feasibility of using the Jupiter launch vehicle for the intermediate phase of Project Mercury, to discuss the Redstone program, and to discuss the cost for Redstone and Jupiter launch vehicles.
- In the Associated Press college football poll of 212 sportswriters, the LSU Tigers finished ahead of the Iowa Hawkeyes, 1,904 points to 1,459, to be recognized by the NCAA as the undisputed champion of the 1958 season in both the AP and UPI rankings. LSU received 139 first-place votes, compared to 17 for Iowa and 13 for the Army Cadets.
- Born: George Saunders, American short story writer; in Amarillo, Texas
- Died:
  - Dr. Ernest Sachs, 79, pioneering American neurosurgeon and (at Washington University School of Medicine) the first Professor of Neurosurgery at a U.S. medical school.
  - Cora Wilson Stewart, 73, American educator who pioneered, in 1914, the night school concept with the opening of the "Moonlight School" in Kentucky, and the subsequent establishment of similar "Moonlight" programs in other states to offer education to illiterate people outside of regular school hours.

== December 3, 1958 (Wednesday) ==
- Ahmed Balafrej, the Prime Minister of Morocco, was fired by King Hassan II after less than seven months in office, following a conflict with the president of Morocco's Constitutional Assembly, Mehdi Ben Barka.

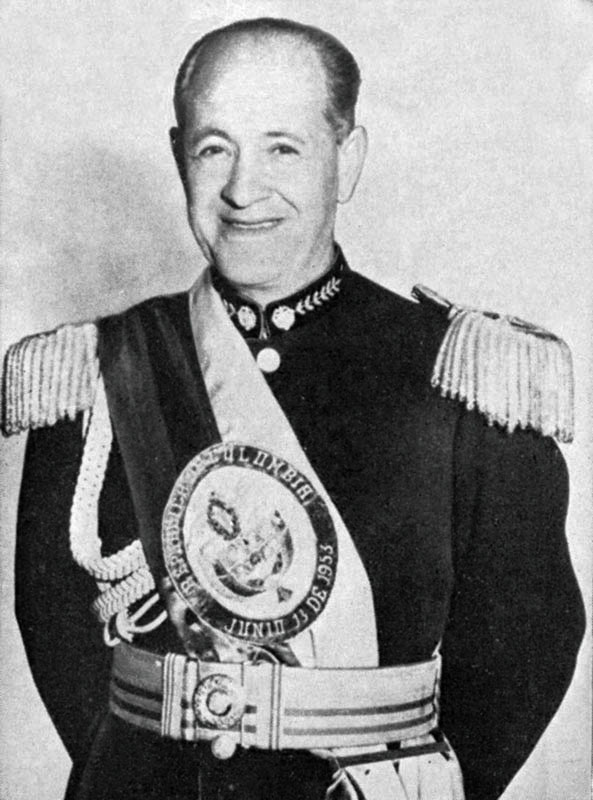
Ex-president Rojas

- Former Colombian dictator Gustavo Rojas Pinilla was arrested on charges of attempting to overthrow the government of the recently elected President Alberto Lleras Camargo. Colombian Army units loyal to President Lleras discovered the coup and took up strategic positions around the capital.
- Control of the Jet Propulsion Laboratory (JPL) at Cal Tech was transferred from the U.S. Army to the administration of NASA, effective January 1, by order of U.S. President Dwight D. Eisenhower.
- American gangster Gus Greenbaum, operator of the Riviera Hotel and Casino in Las Vegas, was found brutally murdered along with his wife Bess in his home in Phoenix, Arizona, the victim of an apparent mob hit, after the Riviera had been losing money while Greenbaum was supporting a gambling and narcotics habit. He was found in his bed, "nearly decapitated with a butcher knife", and his wife was found on a sofa with her throat slit. The crime was never solved.

== December 4, 1958 (Thursday) ==
- All 21 people aboard an Aviaco Airlines SE.161 Languedoc in Spain were killed when the piston-engine plane crashed into the side of "La Rodina de la Mujer Muertal", a mountain peak in the Sierra de Guadarrama range. The plane had departed at 3:40 in the afternoon from Vigo en route to Madrid.
- Died:
  - José María Caro, 92, Chilean Roman Catholic Cardinal and Archbishop of Santiago
  - Isabel Lyon, 94, former private secretary of Mark Twain, who fired her in 1909 after accusing her of embezzlement.

== December 5, 1958 (Friday) ==
- The first British motorway, the Preston By-pass, opened with its dedication by Prime Minister Harold Macmillan. Now part of the M6, the longest four-lane controlled-access highway in the United Kingdom, the 8.2 miles (13.2 km) bypass ran through Lancashire in England from Bamber Bridge to Broughton. Macmillan himself and his chauffeur were the first persons to travel on a British motorway the length of the initial part of the new road, traveling in his Austin Sheerline limousine.
- The first subscriber trunk dialling telephone call in the United Kingdom was made, with Queen Elizabeth II given the honor of making a long-distance phone call to Edinburgh while at a telephone in Bristol. The service is known as "long-distance direct dialing" in the United States.
- Don Jordan of Los Angeles won the world welterweight boxing championship in a unanimous decision over title holder Virgil Akins of St. Louis. Jordan would hold the title for one year and one week, losing on December 12, 1959, to Luis Federico Thompson.
- Actress Ingrid Bergman was restored to her Swedish citizenship by vote of members of the Swedish cabinet in Stockholm. Bergman had lost her citizenship in 1950 by marrying Italian movie producer Roberto Rossellini.
- Arizona State University was created by executive order of Arizona's Governor Ernest McFarland, following the approval by Arizona voters on November 4 of Proposition 200 to fund the transformation of Arizona State College at Tempe into a research university.
- Born: Shinji Harada, Japanese pop music artist; in Hiroshima
- Died:
  - Willie Applegarth, 68, British Olympic champion track and field athlete who held the world record in the 200-meter dash from 1914 to 1928.
  - Patras Bokhari, 60, Pakistani humorist and diplomat who was that nation's first representative to the United Nations.

== December 6, 1958 (Saturday) ==
- Pioneer 3, the third attempt by the United States to launch a lunar probe, was launched from Cape Canaveral on a Juno II rocket at 12:45 in the morning local time (0545 UTC). Pioneer 3 reached an altitude of 63,600 miles (102,400 km) but failed to break Earth's gravitational pull, and fell back out of orbit the next day, 38 hours after its launch, burning up in the atmosphere above Africa at 2:51 in the afternoon (1951 UTC) on Sunday.
- Soviet composer Rodion Shchedrin's First Symphony was given its premier performance, with Natan Rakhlin conducting the Moscow Philharmonic Orchestra.
- The first playoffs in American college football were held in the form of two semifinal games to determine who would play in the December 20 football championship game of the National Association of Intercollegiate Athletics (NAIA). At Tulsa, Oklahoma, Northeastern Oklahoma State beat St. Benedict's College of Kansas, 19-14, while Arizona State College beat visiting Gustavus Adolphus College of Minnesota, at Flagstaff, Arizona, 41 to 12. and Northeastern won, 19-14 Northeastern would defeat Arizona State, 19-13, at the Holiday Bowl in St. Petersburg, Florida on December 20.
- Born: Nick Park, British English animator known for Wallace and Gromit; in Preston, Lancashire

== December 7, 1958 (Sunday) ==
- A mystery that remains unsolved more than sixty years later began when a family from Portland, Oregon, Ken Martin, Barbara Martin, and their three daughters, left home to buy a Christmas tree, and never returned. The body of 12-year-old Virginia Martin was found at the Bonneville Dam on the Columbia River, and the body her 10-year-old sister Susan would be located on May 3 near Camas, Washington. No trace of the other three victims was ever located, nor was their car, a red and white station wagon ever found. After more than sixty years, the mystery remained unsolved.
- Elections were held in West Berlin for the 133-seat "city parliament", and voters rejected all Communist Party candidates on the ballot, halting an attempt by the Soviet Union to make the landlocked area a "neutral city" with no ties to West Germany.
- Basel became the first city in Switzerland to grant women the right to vote and to be elected to office, after the city's men approved a resolution, 9,401 to 5,517.

== December 8, 1958 (Monday) ==
- Moscow Radio announced the removal of General Ivan Serov from his position as director of the KGB, the intelligence agency of the Soviet Union. Despite Serov's support for Khrushchev in a 1957 attempt by the Politburo to remove Khrushchev from leadership of the Soviet Communist Party, Khrushchev acted on the advice of other Politburo members to transfer Serov to the less powerful position of director of the GRU. Khrushchev picked Alexander Shelepin to replace Serov, and would later regret the decision in 1964, when the Politburo removed Khrushchev from power. A prominent Soviet dissident historian, Roy Medvedev, would write in 1978 "With Serov in place, Khrushchev's power would have been intact" in 1964, but that Shelepin "as it turned out, was himself dreaming of taking Khrushchev's place."
- East Germany abolished its five states (Länder) — Brandenburg, Mecklenburg-Vorpommern, Saxony, Saxony-Anhalt and Thuringia — as well as the Länderkammer ("Chamber of States"), the upper house of the bicameral East German parliament, as it moved to a unicameral legislature, the Volkskammer. Pre-selected by East Germany's Communist party, the National Front, the members of the Länderkammer voted the body out of existence. The five Länder were replaced for the rest of the German Democratic Republic's existence by the 14 Bezirke, the administrative units that had been created in 1952 to allow the central government to assume the states' functions. The five Länder would resume existence effective October 3, 1990, to join the 11 West German Bundesländer as part of the Federal Republic of Germany after German reunification.
- Gwadar Port was officially incorporated into Pakistan, three months after it had been purchased from the Sultanate of Oman.
- Fulbert Youlou became the new Prime Minister of the Republic of the Congo, succeeding Jacques Opangault. At the time, the Republic of the Congo had limited self-government as a member of the French Community, and would become fully independent of France on August 15, 1960, with Youlou as its first president.
- The Space Task Group indicated that nine Atlas launch vehicles were required in support of the Project Mercury crewed and uncrewed flights and these were ordered from the Air Force Ballistic Missile Division.
- The Lutheran Church–Missouri Synod Foundation (LCMS Foundation), with assets of nearly one billion U.S. dollars by 2022, was created with the LCMS church to serve as the investment and trust administrator for the Missouri Synod Lutheran church congregations and schools, as well as the seven-unit Concordia University System.
- Born:
  - Vitaly Mutko, Deputy Prime Minister of Russia from 2016 to 2020; in Kurinskaya, Russian SFSR, Soviet Union
  - Mike de Vries, German manager and brand developer; in Arnsberg, West Germany
- Died:
  - Peig Sayers, 85, Irish Gaelic language storyteller (seanchaí)
  - Tris Speaker, 70, American major league centerfielder who had 3,514 hits and a lifetime batting average of .345, enshrined at the Baseball Hall of Fame

== December 9, 1958 (Tuesday) ==
- The mission of the United Nations Observation Group in Lebanon (UNOGIL) ended with the departure from Lebanon of the last 375 U.N. personnel, after the peacekeeping force had originally arrived on June 12.
- The John Birch Society, a right-wing, anti-Communist society, was established at a meeting in Indianapolis, Indiana, at the conclusion of a two-day session of 12 people led by Robert W. Welch Jr. The eponym of the group, John M. Birch, had been a U.S. Army Air Forces captain whom Chinese Communists had killed in 1945 and had become the subject of a 1954 book by Welch.
- An aeromedical selection team composed of U.S. Air Force Major Stanley C. White; U.S. Navy Lt. Robert B. Voas; and U.S. Army Captain William Augerson, drafted a tentative astronaut selection procedure for Project Mercury. According to the plan, representatives from the services and industry would nominate 150 men by January 21, 1959; 36 of these would be selected for further testing which would reduce the group to 12; and in a 9-month training period, a hard core of 6 men would remain. At the end of December 1958, this plan was rejected.
- Died:
  - Major General Bogardus "Bugs" Cairns, 48, commandant of the U.S. Army Aviation School, was killed in a helicopter crash. Cairns, an experienced pilot, was flying the helicopter alone. Ozark Field at Fort Rucker in Alabama was subsequently renamed in his honor.
  - John Jackson, 71, Scottish astronomer who measured the stellar parallax (the determinant of distance) of 1,600 stars

== December 10, 1958 (Wednesday) ==
- National Airlines became the first airline to operate jet service for flights within the United States, as a Boeing 707 plane began flying between Miami and New York City. Jet service had already been inaugurated by Pan Am (which leased a 707 to National) for international flights from the United States to Europe. A flight from New York arrived at Miami shortly before noon with 110 passengers, and then made the return trip at 1:55 p.m.
- The Republic of Upper Volta (République de Haute-Volta, now Burkina Faso) in West Africa became self-governing within the French Community as part of its transition to full independence, with Maurice Yaméogo as the president of the 12-member Council of Ministers. Upper Volta would become a nation on August 5, 1960, with Yaméogo as its first president.
- The Space Task Group appointed a Technical Assessment Committee, with Charles H. Zimmerman serving as chairman, to assist the National Aeronautics and Space Administration Source Selection Board. This group provided the board with technical ratings on contractor proposals.
- The city of Sosnovy Bor was created in the Soviet Union to govern the area around the Leningrad Nuclear Power Plant, 50 miles (80 km) west of Leningrad.
- In Chatsworth, California, two suicide bombers killed themselves and eight other people after setting off a blast at the "Fountain of the World" monastery. The two men, Ralph Muller and Peter Kamenoff, were both former members of the Fountain of the World cult and had decided to kill cult leader Krishna Venta, whom they accused of embezzlement and having an affair with their wives. In their quest to "bring Krishna to justice", Muller and Kamenoff killed themselves, along with Venta and seven bystanders who died in the resulting fire that burned down the monastery and an adjacent dormitory. Venta, born Francis Pencovic, 47, had claimed that he was Jesus Christ and that he had been born 240,000 years earlier "on the planet Neophrates".
- Ritchie Valens In Concert at Pacoima Jr. High was recorded live, less than two months before Valens was killed in a plane crash, as Valens performed at his old junior high school in Los Angeles. The recording would be released two years later to Valens fans.
- Born:
  - Phạm Minh Chính, Prime Minister of Vietnam since 2021; in Hoa Loc, North Vietnam
  - Cornelia Funke, German children's novelist known for the "Inkheart series"; in Dorsten, North Rhine-Westphalia state, West Germany
- Died: Adolfo Camarillo, 94, Hispanic-American philanthropist who co-founded the city of Camarillo, California and developed the Camarillo White Horse breed.

== December 11, 1958 (Thursday) ==
- Willem Drees, Prime Minister of the Netherlands since 1948, resigned along with his cabinet of ministers, when his fragile coalition government of four parties disagreed over whether to increase taxes. Drees and his Partij van de Arbeid (Workers Party) had come into a dispute with its coalition partner, the Katholieke Volkspartij (Catholic People's Party).
- Eleven firms submitted proposals for the development of an American crewed spacecraft. These were AVCO, Chance-Vought, Convair, Douglas, Grumman, Lockheed, Martin, McDonnell, North American, Northrop, and Republic. In addition, Winzen Research Laboratories submitted an incomplete proposal.
- Born: Nikki Six (stage name for Frank Feranna Jr.), American heavy metal bassist, songwriter and co-founder of Mötley Crüe; in San Jose, California
- Died: Alberto Meschi, 79, Italian anarchist and trade union organizer

== December 12, 1958 (Friday) ==
- French Air Force General Maurice Challe arrived in Algeria as the new commander-in-chief of the French forces to lead the counter-insurgency in the fight against the Front de libération nationale (FLN) during the Algerian War. France's then-Prime Minister, Charles de Gaulle, assigned General Challe to replace General Raoul Salan. Though his series of attacks was more successful than previous French efforts in repelling FLN gains, the FLN had already achieved insurmountable control over most of French Algeria. Challe and Salan would later join in an attempted coup against the De Gaulle government in 1961.
- The balloon Small World and its British crew of three men and one woman set off from the Canary Islands in an attempt to make the first free-balloon flight across the Atlantic Ocean, with a destination of Barbados. Radio contact with the expedition, led by Arnold Eloart, was lost after December 19, and a December 26 report that the balloon had landed safely in Venezuela proved to be a hoax.
- Robert R. Gilruth, Mercury Project Manager, requested that the Lewis Flight Research Branch provide technical support for Project Mercury. The Space Task Group was particularly interested in Lewis' instrumentation facilities for use in research and development tests of Big Joe.
- Space Task Group personnel began technical assessment of crewed spacecraft development proposals submitted by industry. Charles Zimmermann headed the technical assessment team.
- Born: Sheree J. Wilson, American TV actress known for Dallas and Walker, Texas Ranger; in Rochester, Minnesota
- Died:
  - Herbert Bankole-Bright, 75, Sierra Leonean politician and independence activist
  - Milutin Milanković, 79, Serbian Yugoslavian astronomer and climatologist who discovered the Milankovitch cycles of the predictable variation of the Earth's change in angle relative to the plane of its orbit would cause variations in the amount of solar energy which would reach the Northern Hemisphere. Milankovic's theory that variations in the amount of solar energy, combined with other factors, could cause climate change sufficient to affect the advance or deterioration of the polar ice caps. The theory, which could not be corroborated with the available means at the time of gathering data, would not be confirmed until 1976, after his death.

== December 13, 1958 (Saturday) ==
- The newly created NASA space agency made its first launch of an animal into space, sending a squirrel monkey named Gordo to an altitude of 300 miles (480 km) on a Jupiter rocket. Gordo endured a 10g force and floated weightlessly inside the capsule for 8.3 minutes, then endured reentry at 40g and 10,000 miles per hour (16,000 km/h). Telemetry showed that Gordo survived the forces, and in good condition, indicating that a human being could endure a launch and return to Earth. Unfortunately, after the spacecraft splashed down in the Atlantic Ocean, the recovery team was unable to locate it after a six-hour search and Gordo was lost at sea.
- The United Nations Office for Outer Space Affairs was created.
- Near Fortaleza in Brazil, a 12-coach express train derailed, sending five cars plunging down an embankment and killing at least 20 people and injuring 50 people.
- Died: Harry "Tim" Moore, 71, African-American vaudeville and TV comedian known for portraying "Kingfish" on The Amos 'n' Andy Show, tuberculosis

== December 14, 1958 (Sunday) ==
- The 3rd Soviet Antarctic Expedition became the first ever to reach the Southern Southern pole of inaccessibility, the location furthest from the ocean within Antarctica, and erected a research station at 82°06′S 54°58′E. After an airstrip was cleared, an Li-2 airplane landed on December 18 at the Pole of Inaccessibility research station.
- Elections were held in the French West African territory of Niger in advance of its expected independence in 1960, with the Union for the Franco-African Community winning 49 of the 60 available seats.
- Fidel Castro's troops captured their first stronghold in Cuba's Camaguey province, "liberating" the town of Florencia.
- Born: Sussan Deyhim, Iranian-born American composer; in Tehran

== December 15, 1958 (Monday) ==
- Arthur Leonard Schawlow and Charles H. Townes of Bell Laboratories published a paper in Physical Review Letters setting out the principles of the optical laser.
- Regular television broadcasting was inaugurated in the South American nation of Peru as Radio América in Lima began programming on Channel 4.
- Born:
  - Alfredo Ormando, Italian writer and gay rights activist who killed himself by self-immolation to protest the Roman Catholic Church condemnation of homosexuality; in San Cataldo, Sicily (d. 1998)
  - Anne Stanback, U.S. activist for LGBT rights and same-sex marriage; in Salisbury, North Carolina
  - Alan Whiticker, Australian non-fiction author; in Penrith, New South Wales
- Died: Wolfgang Pauli, 58, Austrian-born Swiss theoretical physicist and pioneer in quantum physics, 1945 Nobel Prize in Physics laureate, died of pancreatic cancer. Numerous laws of nature and concepts are named for him, including the Pauli exclusion principle and the Schrödinger–Pauli equation.

== December 16, 1958 (Tuesday) ==
- A fire and panic killed 84 people at the Vida Department Store in Bogotá in Colombia. The fire began from a short circuit in colored lights used to decorate a large Nativity Scene in the center of the store's ground floor, and the blaze was fed by paper and straw that spread to nearby counters piled with boxes of toys.
- California's Vandenberg Air Force Base established itself as the U.S. West Coast rocketry center with the launch of a PGM-17 Thor missile.
- Soviet polar pilot V. M. Perov, flying an Li-2, rescued Gaston de Gerlache and three other Belgian polar explorers who had survived five days after a plane crash in Antarctica, 250 kilometres (160 mi) from their base.

== December 17, 1958 (Wednesday) ==
- Dr. T. Keith Glennan, Administrator of NASA, revealed for the first time that the U.S. project to launch a human being into outer space on a "crewed satellite" would be called "Project Mercury".
- Future West German Chancellor Kurt Georg Kiesinger began his political rise by becoming the Minister-President (equivalent to a state governor) of the state of Baden-Württemberg.
- Born: Jayasudha (stage name for Sujatha Nidudavolu), award-winning Indian film actress in Telugu language feature films; in Secunderabad, Andhra Pradesh state
- Died: E. E. Cammack, 77, pioneering English actuary who introduced punchcard computing and tabulating machines to the insurance industry while directing the Aetna Life Insurance Company

== December 18, 1958 (Thursday) ==
- The United States launched the SCORE (Signal Communication by Orbiting Relay Equipment), the world's first communications satellite, from Cape Canaveral on an SM-65B Atlas rocket. Serving as the relay by the U.S. Army's Signal Corps for messages transmitted from one ground station to another, SCORE "proved that active communications satellites could provide a means of transmitting messages of all sorts from one point to any other on the planet Earth." The rocket itself was the satellite, packed with electronic gear designed to transmit and receive.

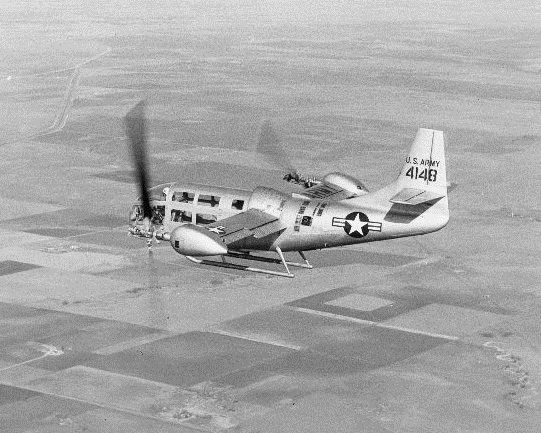
The Bell XV-3 rotors as airplane propellers

- The Bell XV-3 Tiltrotor made the first true mid-air transition from vertical helicopter-type flight to fully level fixed-wing flight, with test pilot Bill Quinlan making the conversion from helicopter mode to airplane mode.

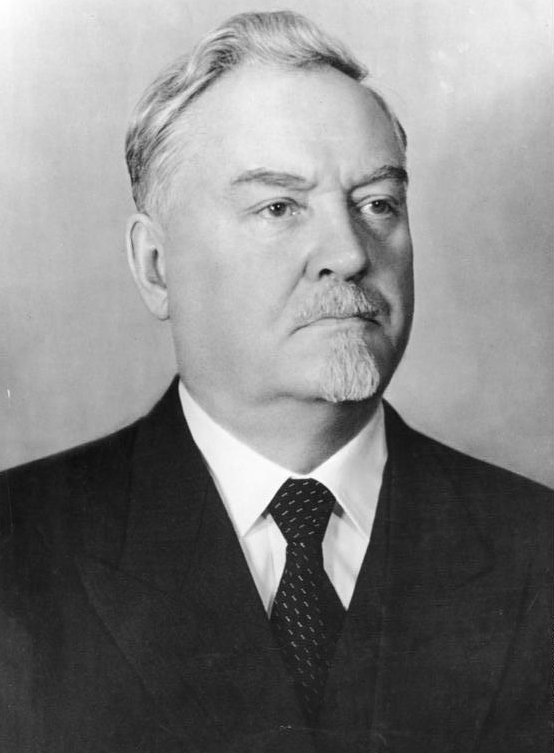
Accused Ex-premier Bulganin

- Former Soviet Premier Nikolai Bulganin, who had been fired on March 27 after being head of the government since 1955, made an appearance before the Central Committee of the Communist Party of the Soviet Union, and delivered a confession of sorts that he had been the leader of an "Anti-Party Group" that had included former Premiers Vyacheslav Molotov (1930-1941) and Georgy Malenkov (1953-1955), former Foreign Minister Dmitri Shepilov (1956-1957) and former Deputy Premier Lazar Kaganovich (1953-1957). On June 18, 1957, Bulganin, Molotov, Malenkov and Kaganovich had been among members of the Communist Party Politburo who had voted, 7 to 4, to remove Khrushchev the Party Secretary. According to the TASS News Agency, Bulganin told the committee, "The stern and principled assessment of the criminal activities of the anti-party group and of my participation in it revealed and helped me to realize all the harm of the group and to see the rottenness of the anti-party swamp in which I found myself." He added "Working in the council of national economy, I see the genius-like character and wisdom of policy of our party and its Central Committee."
- The Republic of Niger was established as an autonomous state within the French Community, under the leadership of Hamani Diori as president for limited domestic self-government, but with France still guiding the West African republic's foreign affairs.
- Born: Julia Wolfe, American composer and 2015 Pulitzer Prize for Music winner; in Philadelphia

== December 19, 1958 (Friday) ==
- In Turkey, near Adana, the fall of a truck down a 450-foot (140 m) ravine killed 33 workers who were riding in the back.
- Pursuant to U.S. Executive Order 50–59, the Advanced Research Projects Agency established Project Shepherd, a predecessor to the United States Space Surveillance Network, as the first network of stations to track orbiting objects as part of national defense. For that purpose, the Space Track Filter Center was opened at Bedford, Massachusetts.
- A pre-recorded message from U.S. President Dwight D. Eisenhower was broadcast from the SCORE satellite to Earth stations at 3:15 in the afternoon Eastern time (2015 UTC) and could be heard on short wave radio at 132.905 megacycles. Eisenhower's statement was "This is the President of the United States speaking. Through the marvels of scientific advance, my voice is coming to you from a satellite circling in outer space. My message is a simple one. Through this unique means, I convey to you and to all mankind America's wish for peace on earth and goodwill toward men everywhere." The message then repeated.
- From All of Us to All of You, produced by Walt Disney Productions as an animated Christmas special, with greetings from Disney characters and cartoons, was shown for the first time, appearing as an episode of the U.S. ABC television network's Walt Disney Presents. The show is an annual feature of television on Christmas Eve in most Scandinavian nations.
- Born: Limahl (stage name for Christopher Hamill), English pop music singer and the lead vocalist for Kajagoogoo; at Pemberton, Lancashire
- Died: Francis P. Murphy, 81, U.S. shoe manufacturer and philanthropist who served as governor of the state of New Hampshire from 1937 to 1940.

== December 20, 1958 (Saturday) ==
- A 9-year-old girl, Mary Olive Hattam, was kidnapped from the town of Ceduna, South Australia, and murdered. The crime led to the arrest and conviction of an Indigenous Australian (referred to at the time as "an Aborigine"), Max Stuart, who was originally picked up for violating a state law prohibiting "full-blooded" Aboriginal people from drinking alcohol without a license. Stuart was charged with murder two days later, then coerced into signing a typed confession despite his limited understanding of the English language, and convicted of the murder, with a scheduled execution day of July 7, 1959. Under pressure from the Australian press over the uncertainty of Stuart's actual guilt and the disparate treatment for Australia's aborigines contrasted with its white people, the state postponed the execution. Stuart would be paroled in 1973. Years later, human rights lawyer Geoffrey Robertson would say of the Stuart case, "It was a dramatic and very important case because it alerted Australia to the difficulties that Aborigines, who then weren't even counted in the census, encountered in our courts. It alerted us to the appalling feature of capital punishment of the death sentence that applied to people who may well be innocent."
- NORAD, the North American Air Defense Command for the U.S. and Canada, approved the creation of 10 "Super Combat Center" underground bunkers that would house the command and control for the 10 NORAD air divisions in the event of a nuclear war. The plan envisioned excavation of caverns in Georgia's Kenesaw Mountain and New York state's Whitehorse Mountain, as well as deep underground bunkers to serve Ottawa, St Louis, San Antonio, Chicago, Phoenix, Portland, Oregon, Spokane, Washington, and Minot, North Dakota. The number of SCCs was reduced to seven in June, then to six by the following December, then canceled altogether effective March 18, 1960.
- The first Copa Chile, a knockout tournament for the championship of Chilean soccer football, ended with Colo-Colo of Macul (a suburb of Santiago) playing to a 2 to 2 draw against Club Deportivo Universidad Católica of Santiago before an audience of 22,752 at the Estadio Nacional de Chile. Colo-Colo was awarded the victory because it had a higher goal average during the tournament (3.00 per game vs. 2.63). The first-place finisher in the regular season, the Santiago Wanderers, had been eliminated in the first round of the tournament by Colo-Colo.

== December 21, 1958 (Sunday) ==
- General Charles de Gaulle was elected president of France for a 7-year term, not by direct vote but indirectly through the largest electoral college ever organized, composed of 80,508 elected officials. The members were from the French Parliament, the Conseils Généraux, the overseas assemblies, and tens of thousands of mayors, deputy mayors and city council members, of whom 79,470 cast valid votes. Prime Minister de Gaulle of the Union for the New Republic received 62,394 votes (78.51% of 79,470), while Georges Marrane of the French Communist Party received 10,355 (12.99%) and Albert Châtelet got 6,721.
- In one of Mexico's worst highway accidents, 70 people were killed when their overcrowded bus ran off the road near Oaxaca de Juárez in the state of Oaxaca. Most of the victims were from the village of San Dionisio Ocotepec and were on their way home from market day in the town of Tlacolula de Matamoros. The bus had a capacity of only 40 people, and many of the passengers were either riding on the top of the bus or hanging on the rear bumper and the doors.
- Born: Cerge Remonde, Filipino journalist who was president of the Radio Philippines Network; in Argao, Cebu (d. of heart attack, 2010)
- Died:
  - Harry Wills, 69, African-American boxer who held the World Colored Heavyweight Championship title three times but who was never permitted to fight for the world championship
  - H. B. Warner, 82, English-born American stage and silent film actor
  - Lion Feuchtwanger, 74, German Jewish novelist

== December 22, 1958 (Monday) ==
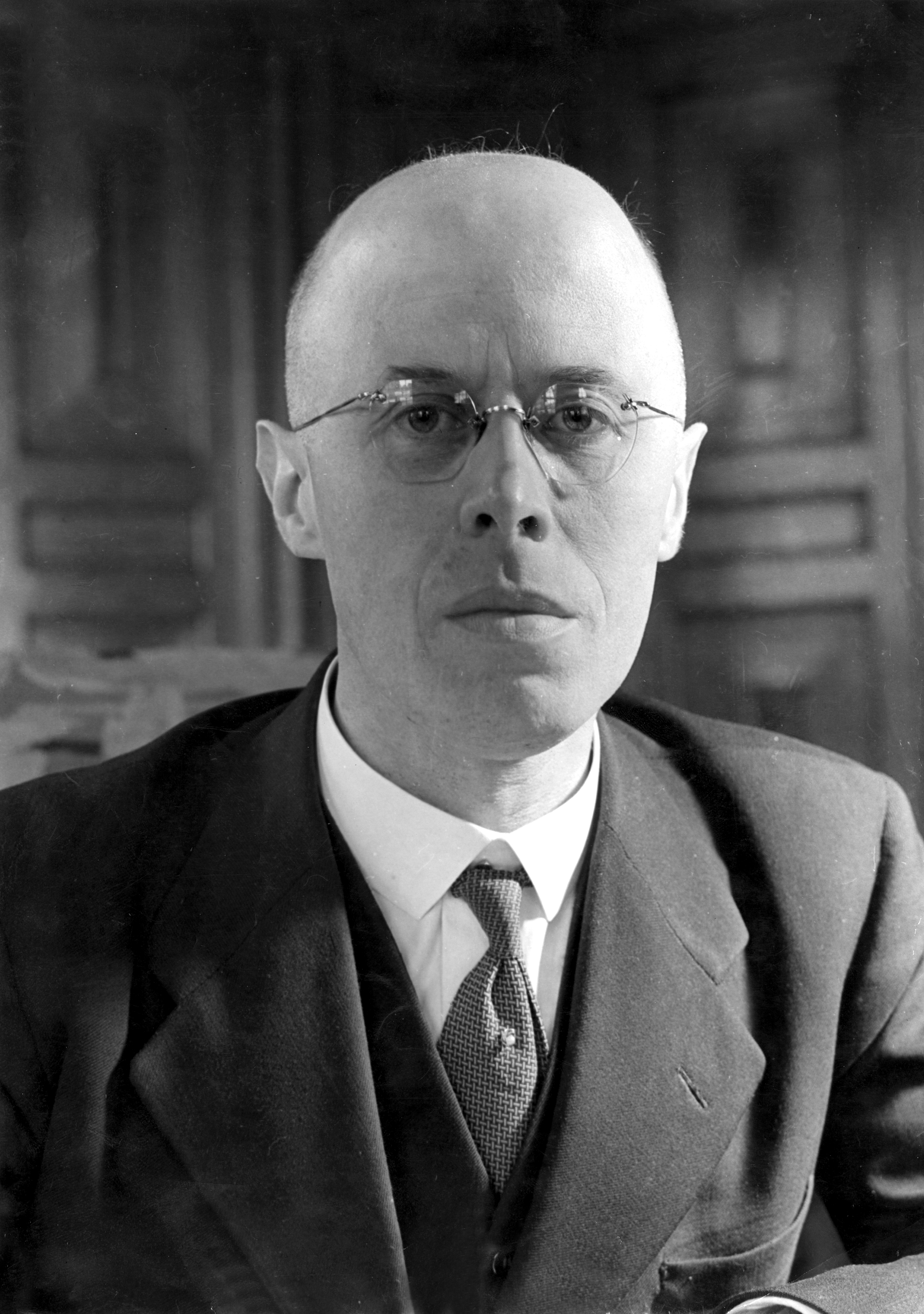
Beel

- Louis Beel became the new Prime Minister of the Netherlands, forming a new cabinet of ministers after the collapse of the coalition government of the December 11 Willem Drees.
- The comedy film Andy Hardy Comes Home, with Mickey Rooney reprising his signature role at the age of 38, was premiered by Metro-Goldwyn-Mayer in an attempt to revive the popular Andy Hardy movie series that had run from 1937 to 1946. The movie, which included Rooney's son Teddy as Andy Rooney Jr., was not well-received and was unable to recover its budget of $650,000.
- A bus crash in Greece killed 29 of the 34 people aboard after running off of a steep road near the village of Petrovouni outside of Ioannina while on its way to Chouliarades. The bus ran off the side of a steep cliff and fell down a nearly 1,200 feet (370 m) high slope into the Arachthos gorge.
- Morton Smith, a professor ancient history at Columbia University, published his translation and photographs of the "Secret Gospel of Mark", which he had discovered as a letter at the library of the Mar Saba, a Greek Orthodox monastery near Bethlehem. Smith attributed authorship to Clement of Alexandria, a 2nd-century Christian theologian.
- Born: Omurbek Tekebayev, former Speaker of the Parliament of Kyrgyzstan (2005 to 2006), later imprisoned on politically motivated charges of corruption and fraud; in Jalal-Abad, Kirghiz SSR, Soviet Union
- Died:
  - Sir Geoffrey Colby, 57, British colonial administrator who had been Governor of Nyasaland (now the Republic of Malawi) from 1948 to 1956
  - Đuro Vilović, 69, Yugoslav Croatian author later prosecuted for collaboration with the Axis occupiers.

== December 23, 1958 (Tuesday) ==
- The Tokyo Tower, designed as a duplicate of the Eiffel Tower of Paris, but 9 metres (30 ft) taller, opened to the public as the tallest freestanding tower in the world.
- All 21 people aboard Aeroflot Flight 466 were killed as the Ilyushin Il-14 was approaching Tashkent in Uzbekistan from Ashgabat in Turkmenistan on the last scheduled leg of a multistop trip within the Soviet Union. The plane stalled while making a second approach to the runway in poor weather.
- Switzerland's seven-member Federal Council voted to instruct the historically neutral nation's department of defense to study the logistics and execution of attaining nuclear weapons.

== December 24, 1958 (Wednesday) ==
- In the United Kingdom, nine people were killed in the crash of a BOAC Airlines Bristol Britannia 312, after both the pilot and co-pilot misread a poorly-designed altimeter (an analog model with three hands instead of two) and began a descent in fog from an altitude of 1,500 feet (460 m), in the belief that they were flying at 11,500 feet (3,500 m). The controlled flight into terrain brought the Britannia down near Winkton, Dorset in England. Three crew members survived. As a result, the British Ministry of Transport issued a directive to replace the altimeters and to be designed to have an indicator when altitude was less than 1,500 feet.
- Abdallah Ibrahim became the new Prime Minister of Morocco after being appointed by King Mohammed V as President of the Governing Council of Morocco.
- The 66-foot (20 m) tall Cristo de La Habana statue of Jesus Christ was dedicated by national and local government officials, 15 days before many of the politicians fled from Fidel Castro. The statue was carved by Cuban sculptor Jilma Madera, and is located on top of the La Cabaña hill overlooking Havana Harbor.
- Born: Wang Luoyong, Chinese stage, film and television actor; in Luoyang, Henan province
- Died: Elizabeth McQueen Bancroft, 80, American philanthropist and founder of the Women's International Association of Aeronautics

== December 25, 1958 (Thursday) ==
- The Harwoods Hole cave system in New Zealand was explored for the first time, as seven spelunkers used a winch to lower explorers into the deep cavern. David May, a teenager, was the first to be lowered in and reached a depth of 600 feet (180 m) to the cave floor.
- United Arab Airlines was created by the merger of the official airlines of the two nations that had united earlier in the year to create the United Arab Republic, as Syrian Airways and Misrair (Egypt's national airline) merged by arrangement of the UAR government. The UAR had been created by the merger of Egypt and Syria. As with the United Arab Republic, the merger of the two airlines was broken up in 1961, with the two becoming Syrian Arab Airlines and Egyptair.
- Born:
  - Rickey Henderson, American baseball left fielder who holds the record for most stolen bases in a career (1,406) and in a season (130 in 1982), enshrined at the Baseball Hall of Fame; in Chicago
  - Alannah Myles, Canadian singer and songwriter, Grammy Award winner for "Black Velvet"; in Toronto
  - Dimi Mint Abba, Mauritanian musician; in Tidjikja (d. 2011 of cerebral hemorrhage)

== December 26, 1958 (Friday) ==
- U.S. President Eisenhower directed that the secret Special Group 303 committee begin holding weekly meetings, with representatives of the U.S. State Department and U.S. Department of Defense participating to ensure that the President would be aware of all ongoing operations of the U.S. Central Intelligence Agency (CIA).
- Died: Viola Turpeinen, 49, American accordion player, died of cancer.

== December 27, 1958 (Saturday) ==
- In Egypt, representatives of the Soviet Union and the United Arab Republic signed an agreement for a 400 million rubles (equivalent to US$100,000,000) loan from the Soviets for the construction of the proposed Aswan Dam. Under the terms of the agreement, the loan was at 2 1/2% interest and payment would not begin until January 1, 1964. U.S. support for construction of the dam had been halted in 1956. The Vice President of the UAR, Field Marshal Abdel Hakim Amer signed along with Soviet Ambassador to Egypt E.D. Kisaelev and the Chairman of the Soviet Committee for Foreign Economic Relations, Pyotr Nikitin.
- Japan created its first universal health insurance program with the enactment of the National Health Care Act creating National Health Insurance (Japan) (NIH) (国民健康保険 or Kokumin-Kenkō-Hoken) for persons not covered by Employees' Health Insurance (健康保険 or Kenkō-Hoken).
- Indonesia nationalized all Netherlands-owned companies that had been created during the colonial period of the Dutch East Indies, including those operating hospitals, plantations, electrical power, and oil exploration, drilling and refining, as President Sukarno issued 1958 Law No. 86.
- A sudden storm off of the coast of Japan's Fukushima Prefecture sank seven fishing boats and killed 52 crew aboard, while 30 other boats from the Matsukawa Fisheries and the Harakama Fisheries were able to reach land safely. Another three ships sank in the Pacific Ocean storms elsewhere in Japan, and more than 50 people were missing.
- Two deputies of the Congress of the Republic of Peru fought in an unsuccessful duel after Carlos Bisso challenged Victor Freundt Rosell to gunshots and 40 meters. Freundt had called Bisso "an ignoramus" during an angry debate over the government budget, prompting the argument. Meeting at a field in Lima, the two men fired at each other with a pistol and missed. They then agreed to try again from a distance of 30 meters and missed again. With only their pride wounded, the two politicians "decided to give up and shook hands."
- Born:
  - Shahid Khaqan Abbasi, Prime Minister of Pakistan 2017 to 2018; in Murree, Punjab province
  - Susur Lee, Hong Kong-born Canadian chef, in Hong Kong
  - Emory Tate, U.S. chess player and the first African-American grandmaster; in Chicago (d. 2015)
- Died: Mustafa Merlika-Kruja, 71, Prime Minister of Albania 1941 to 1943 during the Axis occupation, known for his persecution of the Serbian Albanian minority

== December 28, 1958 (Sunday) ==
- In American football, the Baltimore Colts beat the New York Giants 23–17 to win the NFL Championship Game, the first to go into sudden death overtime. The event, telecast on the NBC network, would be described later as "The Greatest Game Ever Played". As one author would note 60 years later, "The 1958 title game was a seminal moment in pro football history, laying the foundation with the American public for the ultra-popular spectacle that pro football would become, and for the marriage of the sport with television."
- The decisive battle of the Cuban Revolution, the Battle of Santa Clara, began as the troops of Che Guevara invaded the town of Camajuaní and captured it within a day with minimal fighting, then entered the city of Santa Clara by sundown.
- The popular Japanese adventure film The Hidden Fortress (Kakushi toride no san akunin), directed by Akira Kurosawa, premiered in theaters. George Lucas would later acknowledge the film as one of the major influences on Star Wars.
- The most popular musical duo in Spain, the Dúo Dinámico, was formed by Manuel de la Calva and Ramón Arcusa.
- Born: Fabian Blattman, Australian paralympic athlete; in Narrandera, New South Wales
- Died:
  - Edward J. Noble, 76, American candy manufacturer who bought the exclusive rights to Life Savers and later purchased the NBC Blue Network of radio stations and renamed it the American Broadcasting Company.
  - Mateo M. Capinpin, 71, Philippine Army officer and later a collaborator with the Japanese occupation forces.

== December 29, 1958 (Monday) ==
- Rebel troops under Camilo Cienfuegos and Che Guevara began the invasion of Santa Clara province in Cuba, in the deciding battle of the Cuban Revolution.
- A contract was awarded to North American Aviation for design and construction of the Little Joe air frame.
- The town of Los Ranchos de Albuquerque, New Mexico, an upscale suburb of Albuquerque commonly referred to as "Los Ranchos", was incorporated.
- Born:
  - Lakhdar Belloumi, Algerian soccer football midfielder with 100 games for the national team, later the coach of the team's coach; in Mascara, French Algeria
  - Nancy J. Currie-Gregg, American astronaut on four space shuttle missions; as Nancy Jane Decker in Wilmington, Delaware
- Died:
  - Doris Humphrey, 63, American choreographer and dancer
  - Edward S. Jordan, 76, American automaker and advertising executive who operated the Jordan Motor Car Company from 1916 to 1931.
  - Moshe Shatzkes, 77, Lithuanian-born American rabbi and Talmudic scholar

== December 30, 1958 (Tuesday) ==
- In Brazil, 21 of the 37 people aboard a VASP airlines flight died when the Saab 90 Scandia piston airplane suffered an engine failure during takeoff from Rio de Janeiro on a flight to São Paulo and plunged into Guanabara Bay.
- Cuban rebels of the 26th of July movement led by Camilo Cienfuegos won the Battle of Yaguajay, clearing the way for an unimpeded invasion of Havana.
- The Guatemalan Air Force fired on Mexican fishing boats which had strayed into Guatemalan territory, triggering the Mexico–Guatemala conflict.
- U.S. President Eisenhower announced that he would return from vacation to the White House on January 3 so that he could sign the necessary proclamation of statehood to admit Alaska as the 49th of the United States. Eisenhower, speaking from his farm at Gettysburg, Pennsylvania, said that he would also use the opportunity to unveil the newly designed 49-star flag.
- Space Task Group's technical assessment teams completed the evaluation of industry proposals for design and construction of a crewed spacecraft and forwarded their findings to the Source Selection Board, NASA Headquarters.
- Cecil Kelley, 38, American chemical operator at Los Alamos National Laboratory, was fatally injured by a massive dose of Cherenkov radiation from a high concentration of plutonium-239 while operating a mixing tank. He died 35 hours after the accident.

== December 31, 1958 (Wednesday) ==
- The government of the Philippines issued a general amnesty for all remaining Japanese prisoners who had been convicted of war crimes.
- At a New Year's Eve party for his cabinet and top government and military officials, Cuba's President Fulgencio Batista told his guests that he was going to leave the country before Fidel Castro's troops arrived. Batista and 40 family members and supporters boarded an airplane at 3:00 in the morning the next day at Camp Columbia and flew to the Dominican Republic, along with much of his fortune of $300 million that he had amassed from graft and payoffs.
- Born:
  - Bebe Neuwirth, American TV, stage and film actress, winner of two Emmy Awards for portraying "Lilith" on Cheers, and two Tony Awards for Sweet Charity and the musical Chicago; as Beatrice Neuwirth in Newark, New Jersey
  - Defao (stage name for Lulendo Matumona), popular Congolese/Zairean singer; in Leopoldville, Belgian Congo (now Kinshasa, Democratic Republic of Congo) (d. 2021)
- Died:
  - Hermann Unger, 72, German composer
  - Valentina Pavlovna Wasson, 57, Russian-born American pediatrician and promoter of psychoactive mushrooms for adults
