= January 1959 =

Month of 1959

<<	January 1959					>>
Su	Mo	Tu	We	Th	Fr	Sa
				1	2	3
4	5	6	7	8	9	10
11	12	13	14	15	16	17
18	19	20	21	22	23	24
25	26	27	28	29	30	31

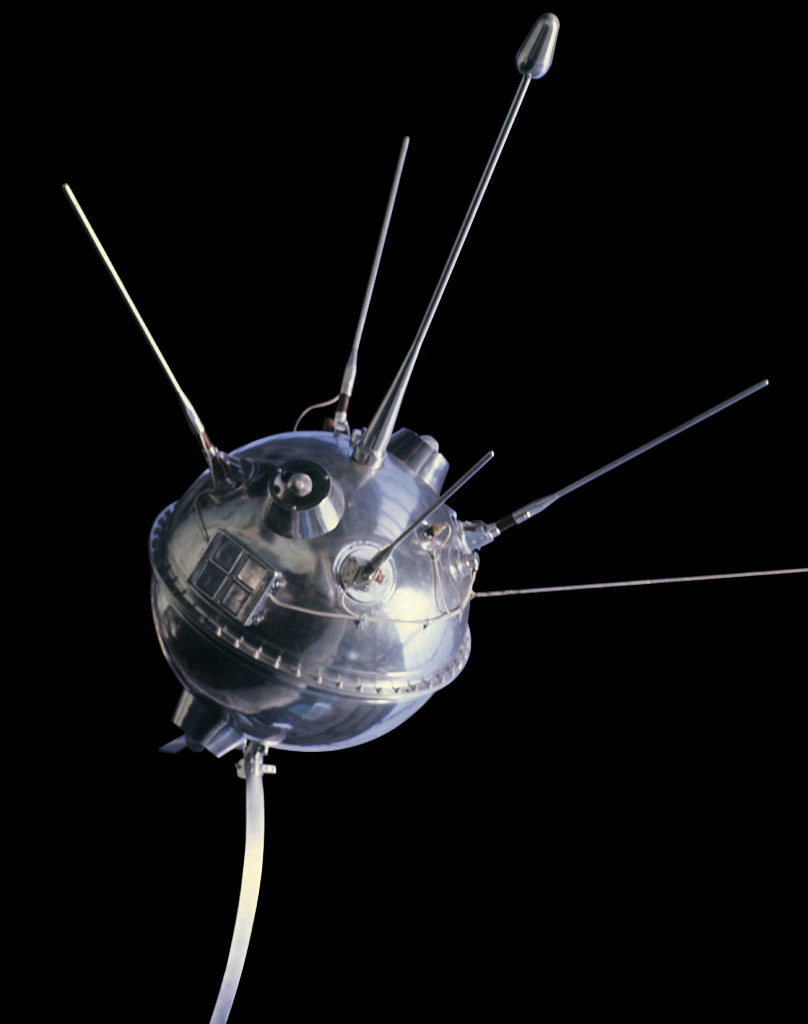
January 4, 1959: Luna-1 enters orbit around Sun, becomes the first man-made "planet"

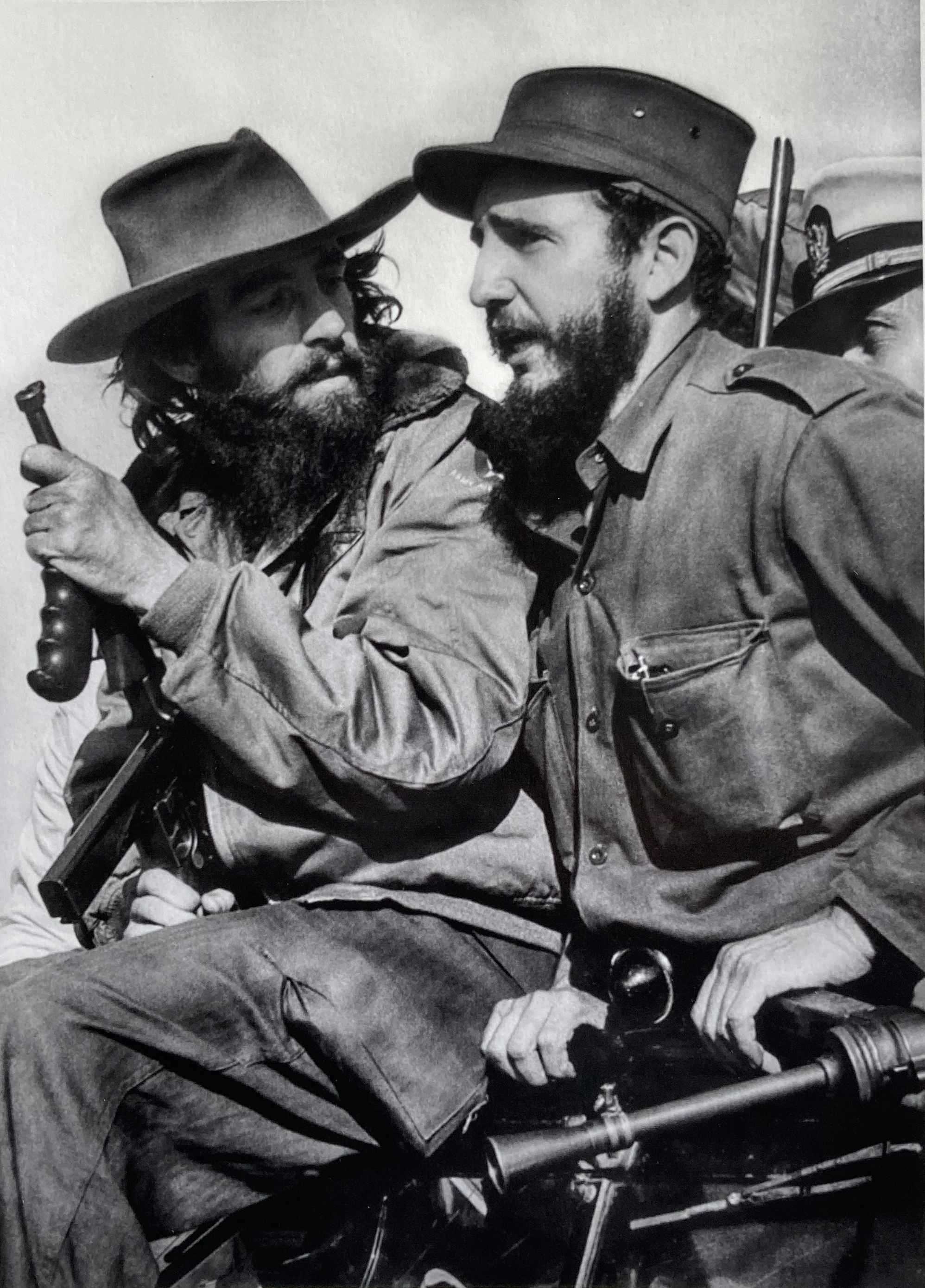
January 8, 1959: Fidel Castro arrives in Havana

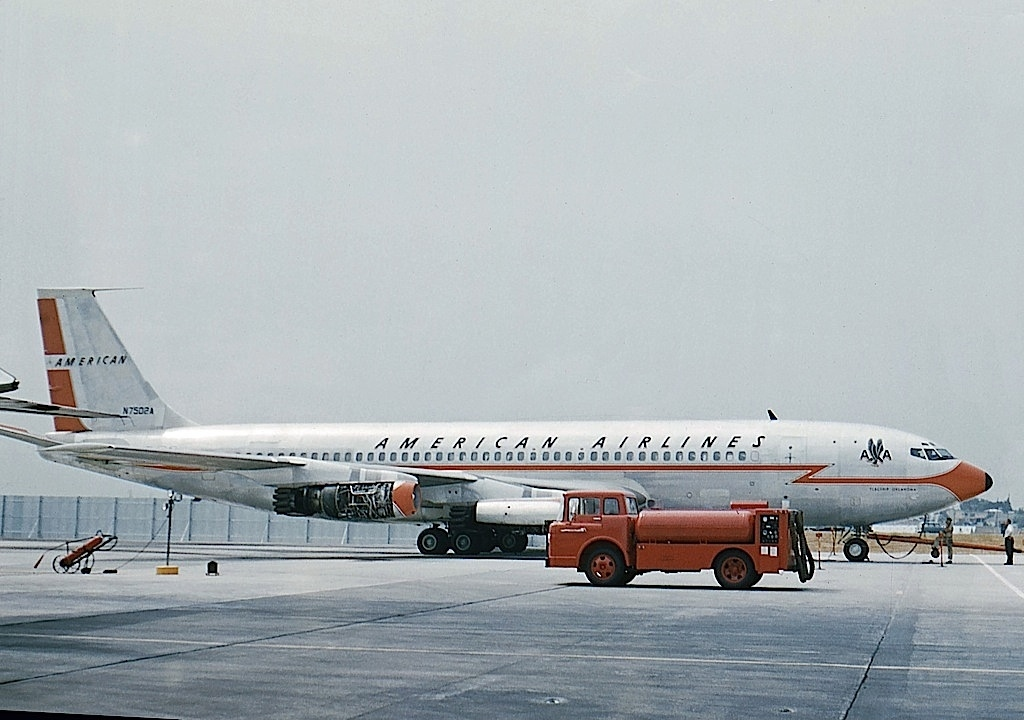
January 25, 1959: Boeing 707 begins service

January 3, 1959: 49th state added to the U.S.A.

The following events occurred in January 1959:

== January 1, 1959 (Thursday) ==
- Cuban President Fulgencio Batista fled to the Dominican Republic as the forces of Fidel Castro closed in. Before leaving, Batista named Judge Carlos Manuel Piedra as provisional president. Piedra ordered a cease-fire moments after taking office. At 10:00 pm, the ships USS Francis M. Robinson (DE-220), USS Jack W. Wilke (DE-800) and USS Peterson (DE-152) were directed to sail to Cuba to evacuate Americans if necessary.
- Cultivars of plants, such as new varieties of roses, could no longer bear a Latin name, as of this date, based on an amendment to the ICNCP, the International Code of Nomenclature of Cultivated Plants.
- Born: Azali Assoumani, President of the Comoros 1999–2002; in Mitsoudjé

== January 2, 1959 (Friday) ==
- The Soviet Union successfully launched the Luna 1 satellite from Baikonur Cosmodrome. Luna 1 would become the first man-made object to escape the pull of the Earth's gravity and the first man-made object to orbit the Sun.
- As Castro's rebel forces rolled into Havana, the 32-year-old leader named Dr. Manuel Urrutia Lleo as President of Cuba.
- CBS Radio canceled four of its daytime soap operas: Backstage Wife, Our Gal Sunday, The Road of Life, and This Is Nora Drake.
- Died: William Douglas Francis, 69, Australian botanist

== January 3, 1959 (Saturday) ==
Flag of the Suvadive Republic

- Separatists in the Maldivian islands of Suvadiva, Addu and Fua Mulaku declared independence. Abdullah Aleef proclaimed the United Suvadive Republic, which Maldivian troops would crush later that year.

Flag of Alaska

- President Dwight D. Eisenhower proclaimed Alaska as the 49th U.S. state at 12:02 p.m. in Washington. A new American flag, with seven staggered rows, each with seven stars, was introduced. Given that a 50th state might soon be admitted, the 49-state flag was not widely produced, and Eisenhower added, "With limited exceptions, agencies of the Federal Government will continue to display the 48-star flag so long as it is still in good condition and until existing stocks of unused flags are exhausted. It is appropriate for all citizens to do the same."
- Died: Edwin Muir, 71, Scottish poet, novelist and translator

== January 4, 1959 (Sunday) ==
- At 0259 GMT, the Luna 1 satellite became the first man-made object to enter into an orbit around the Sun, making it our solar system's first artificial planet. Because the second-stage engine shutdown command from the Soviet space center was received slightly late, Luna 1 did not land on the Moon as planned but passed within 5,965 kilometres (3,706 mi) before passing into heliocentric orbit. U.S. President Dwight Eisenhower congratulated Soviet scientists on achieving "a great stride forward in man's advance into the infinite reaches of outer space", while House leader John W. McCormack commented that "it is time America awoke to its peril". Russian astrophysicist Ivan Shevchenko would comment nearly 60 years later, "[W]ho cares at present where is Luna-1... called a man-made 'tenth' planet? Of course, this remark does not mean that a study of the long-term motion of Luna-1 may lead to a theoretical breakthrough."
- Riots broke out in Léopoldville (now Kinshasa) in the Congo after police broke up a meeting of the independence group ABAKO. After two days, at least 49 people had been killed.

== January 5, 1959 (Monday) ==
- Four British balloonists were rescued at sea, 19 days after contact was lost during their attempt to sail across the Atlantic. The Small World had set off from the Canary Islands on December 12, bound for Barbados. A fishing vessel located the floating gondola and brought the three men and one woman the rest of the way.
- Qualifications were established for Project Mercury pilot selection in a meeting at the NASA Headquarters. These qualifications were as follows: age, less than 40; height, less than 5 feet 11 inches (1.80 m); excellent physical condition; bachelor's degree or equivalent; graduate of test pilot school; 1,500 hours flight time; and a qualified jet pilot.
- New York Herald-Tribune columnist Marie Torre went to jail for a 10-day sentence for contempt of court rather than reveal her source for a 1957 story about Judy Garland. Torre was imprisoned on the seventh floor of the Hudson County Jail in Jersey City. She was released on her tenth day on January 14, without disclosing her information. Torre, later to become a television anchorperson in Pittsburgh, would be recalled after her death in 1997 as "the first reporter to gain national attention for going to jail for refusing to identify a news source."
- Democrat Pat Brown took office as Governor of California, succeeding Republican Goodwin Knight.
- Born: Clancy Brown, American actor (Carnivàle); in Urbana, Ohio

== January 6, 1959 (Tuesday) ==
- In Bowling Green, Virginia, Mildred and Richard Loving were found guilty of a felony for violating Virginia Code §20-59, the law against miscegenation. Richard was white, Mildred was black, and they had married in Washington, D.C., on June 2, 1958, then returned to live with her parents in Central Point. They were arrested ten days later. Judge Leon M. Bazile sentenced them each to a year in jail, suspending the sentence on condition that they leave Virginia for 25 years. Mr. and Mrs. Loving moved to Washington, D.C., but in 1963 they filed a motion in the court to vacate the judgment. After Virginia's highest court upheld the law, the Lovings appealed to the United States Supreme Court. On June 12, 1967, in the case of Loving v. Virginia, the Court ruled as unconstitutional the Virginia law, and similar laws in 15 other states.
- In the House of Representatives, Joseph W. Martin's 20-year reign as leader of the House Republicans ended by a 74–70 vote of the GOP caucus. Martin, who had been Speaker of the House from 1947 to 1949, was replaced by Charles A. Halleck of Indiana.
- A meeting was held at the National Aeronautics and Space Administration Headquarters to discuss the method for spacecraft heat protection. Two plans were considered: beryllium heat sink and ablation. Based on this meeting a decision was made to modify the spacecraft structure in order to accommodate interchangeably ablation heat shields and beryllium heat sinks, and orders were placed for 12 and 6, respectively.

== January 7, 1959 (Wednesday) ==
- Cuba's new government announced the first executions of former officials of Fulgencio Batista. Ten officers were executed at Santiago including Col. Arcadio Casillas, who oversaw Santiago. The same day, the United States recognized the new Cuban government of Fidel Castro.
- At 12:39, the U.S. Congress gained three new members. Bob Bartlett and Ernest Gruening took the oath as Senators, and Ralph J. Rivers became Alaska's lone U.S. Representative.

== January 8, 1959 (Thursday) ==
- Four Egyptian MiG-17 jets penetrated Israeli airspace near Beersheba before Israeli fighters drove them off.

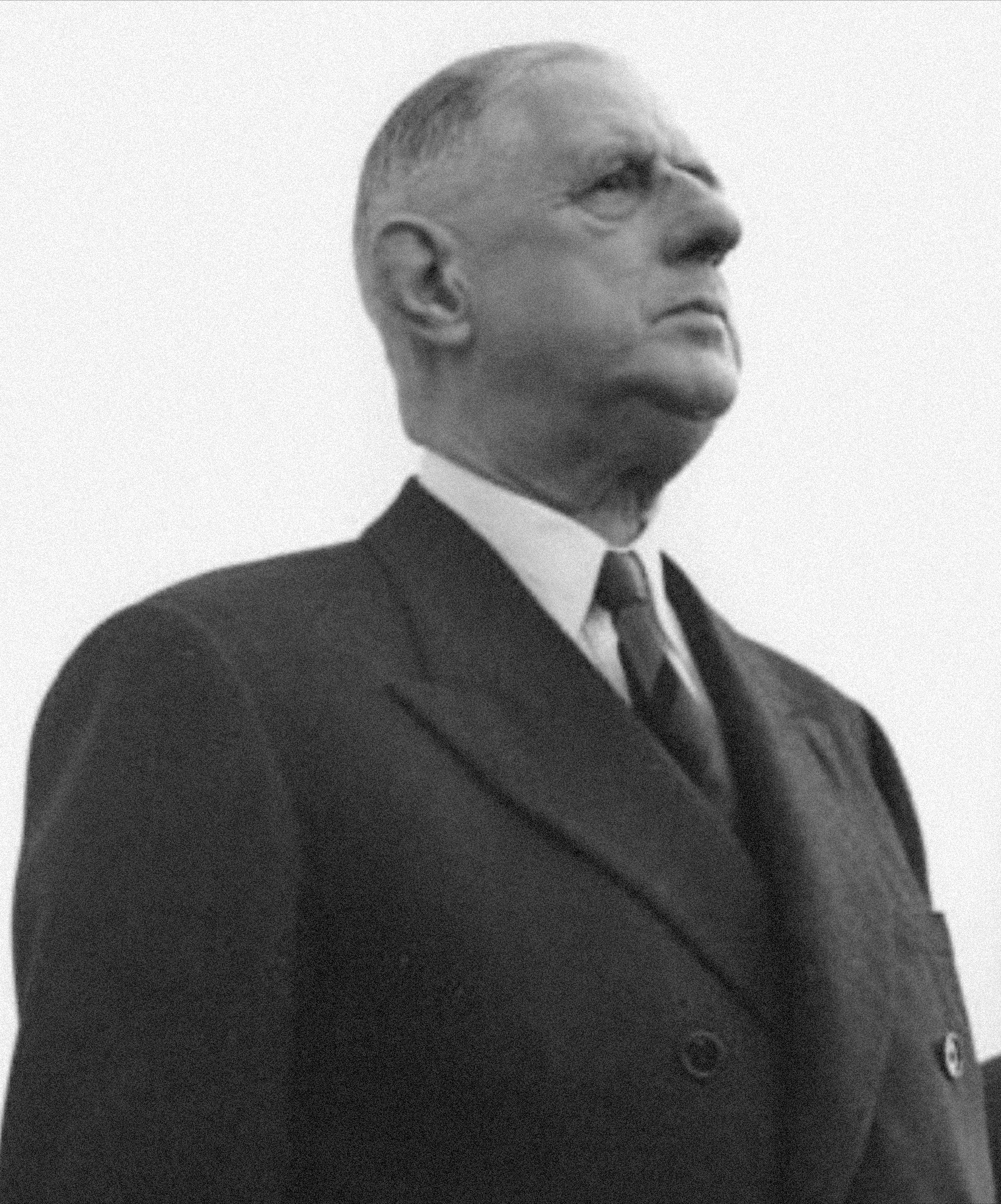
De Gaulle

- Charles de Gaulle was inaugurated President of France, the first under the new constitution as the Fifth Republic, while Michel Debré became Prime Minister, the office formerly held by de Gaulle.
- Cheering crowds greeted Fidel Castro as he made a triumphant entry into Havana.
- Born: Paul Hester, Australian musician (Split Enz, Crowded House) and television personality (d. 2005, suicide by hanging)

== January 9, 1959 (Friday) ==
- The Vega de Tera disaster killed 144 people in the village of Ribadelago in Spain's province of Zamora. At 12:30 in the morning, the dam holding back the lake waters of Lago de Sanabria burst, causing 1.7 billion U.S. gallons (6.5 billion liters) of water to sweep through the town.
- The Source Selection Board at NASA Headquarters completed their findings. McDonnell Aircraft Corporation was selected as the prime contractor to develop and produce the Mercury spacecraft.
- Born: Rigoberta Menchú, Guatemalan writer, 1992 Nobel Peace Prize laureate, in Laj Chimel

== January 10, 1959 (Saturday) ==
- The U.S. District Court in Atlanta ordered the University System of Georgia to admit qualified African-Americans in its segregated colleges, striking down a requirement that at least two college alumni had to sign for a student to enroll. Meanwhile, the federal court in Little Rock ordered the school board to integrate and reopen the Arkansas city's high schools, which had been closed for four months.
- Born:
  - Mark Martin, American NASCAR stock car racing driver, five-time IROC champion (1995 to 1998, and 2005) and NASCAR Hall of Fame inductee; in Batesville, Arkansas
  - Chris Van Hollen, U.S. Senator for Maryland since 2017; in Karachi, Pakistan, where his father, U.S. diplomat Christopher Van Hollen Sr. was stationed

== January 11, 1959 (Sunday) ==
- All 36 people on Lufthansa Flight 502 were killed when the L-1049G Super Constellation airliner crashed at Rio de Janeiro. The airliner was attempting to land in on the fifth stop of a flight from Hamburg to Buenos Aires, plowing into Flecheiras Beach after striking the water.
- A nine-day-old baby girl, who had been kidnapped from a hospital three hours after her birth, was found safe at a Brooklyn apartment. Mrs. Jean Iavarone was arrested on charges of having stolen Lisa Chionchio from St. Peter's Hospital in New York on January 2, prompting a citywide hunt.
- In Carmel, California, retired movie actress Claire Delmar was found stabbed to death in her home. Delmar, whose real name was Claire Mohr, had appeared in silent films with Al Jolson in The Jazz Singer and with Rudolph Valentino in The Four Horsemen.
- Born: Majed Abdullah, Saudi Arabian footballer with 117 caps and 72 goals for the Saudi Arabia national team; in Jeddah

== January 12, 1959 (Monday) ==
- In Spain, five boys who wanted to go hunting for bats discovered the Caves of Nerja. The caves, blocked by stalactites, had been sealed for more than 3,000 years and were a trove of Paleolithic artifacts.
- In the largest mass execution of former officials since Castro's victory, Cuban communists shot 71 supporters of Fulgencio Batista over a seven-hour period, then buried them in a mass grave.
- Motown Records, a major force in discovering and promoting the music of numerous African-American singers and bands, was founded by Berry Gordy Jr. in Detroit, Michigan, with the original name of "Tamla Records". On April 14, 1960, in honor of Detroit, "The Motor Town", Gordy would rename "Tamla" and incorporate Motown Record Corporation.
- Born: Per Gessle, Swedish singer-songwriter and Roxette guitarist; in Halmstad

== January 13, 1959 (Tuesday) ==
- Forty people were missing after the explosion of the tanker Mirador as it was being towed into the harbor at Iskenderun, Turkey. All 34 of the crew of the tugboat Imroz were presumed dead.
- Voters in the California towns of Decoto and Alvarado, in Alameda County, overwhelmingly (by a total margin of 837 to 220) approved a referendum to merge the two unincorporated communities into a municipality. The union of the two was incorporated as Union City on January 26. The town of 6,000 would grow to almost 70,000 within 50 years.

== January 14, 1959 (Wednesday) ==
- Antarctic explorers from Japan were stunned to find alive two of the 15 Karafuto husky dogs that they had abandoned eleven months earlier. A six-man advance party had helicoptered from the ship Soya to reopen the base on Ongul Island. Masami Muriyama radioed back that the dogs greeted them with tails wagging, and were in good condition. The next day, Japan was in celebration, with hourly updates on the radio, and a headline "in type normally reserved for the outbreak of war" announcing "TWO DOGS SURVIVE!" The story was recounted in the 1983 film Nankyoku Monogatari and the inspiration for the 2006 Disney film Eight Below.
- Japan's Crown Prince and future Emperor, Prince Akihito, announced his engagement to commoner Michiko Shoda, breaking tradition. His proposal included traditional gifts of sea bream, rice wine, and five rolls of silk, and was sealed by a prayer to his ancestors in three Shinto shrines.
- Preliminary negotiations were started with McDonnell on the technical and legal aspects of the Mercury spacecraft research and development program.

== January 15, 1959 (Thursday) ==
- The Soviet Union announced its first census since World War II. The final tally would show the population of the USSR in 1959 to be 208,826,650.
- In Montgomery, Alabama, Circuit Judge George C. Wallace was cited for contempt of court for defying an order by U.S. District Judge Frank M. Johnson Jr. to turn over voter registration records to the U.S. Civil Rights Commission. Judge Wallace, who would become Governor of Alabama, had blocked inspection of records by turning them over to grand juries instead of the Commission.
- Andrija Artukovic, wanted for Nazi war crimes from his role as an official in the puppet state of Croatia, was allowed to stay in the United States after a federal commissioner ruled against Yugoslavia's request for extradition. Artukovic, wanted for ordering the murders of 200,000 of his countrymen in 1941 and 1942, would finally be extradited in 1986, and would die at 88 before a death sentence could be carried out.

== January 16, 1959 (Friday) ==
- The crash of Austral Líneas Aéreas Flight 205, an Argentina-based airline, killed all but one of the 51 persons on board. The C-46 Commando plane had been carrying vacationers from Buenos Aires to Mar del Plata and exploded while attempting to land, before crashing into the Atlantic Ocean. The sole survivor, Roberto Servente, was found on the beach four hours later. On board had been Argentine scientists Eduardo Braun-Menéndez and Jose Mezzadra.
- John A. McCone, Chairman of the United States Atomic Energy Commission, demonstrated the compact radioisotope thermoelectric generator at the White House, placing the 5-pound (2.3 kg), Polonium-210 powered atomic generator on President Dwight D. Eisenhower's desk. According to McCone, the generator was 20 times more efficient than any prior model.
- NASA requested the Army Ordnance Missile Command, Huntsville, Alabama, to construct and launch eight Redstone launch vehicles and two Jupiter launch vehicles in support of Project Mercury crewed and uncrewed flights.
- During a meeting of the Space Task Group, it was decided to negotiate with McDonnell for design of spacecraft that could be fitted with either a beryllium heat sink or an ablation heat shield. Robert R. Gilruth, the project director, considered that for safety purposes, both should be used. He also felt that the recovery landing bag should be replaced by a honeycombed crushable structure. At this same meeting, a tentative decision was also made that design, development, and contract responsibilities for the Mercury tracking network would be assigned to the Langley Research Center.
- Born: Sade, Nigerian-born British singer; as Helen Folasade Adu in Ibadan

== January 17, 1959 (Saturday) ==
- In San Francisco, the North American Rugby Football League was unveiled in a press conference, with Ward Nash as Commissioner of the first pro rugby league in the United States. Former 49er Gordy Soltau was introduced as owner of the San Francisco franchise in a projected six-team league with Los Angeles, Vancouver, Seattle, Houston and Dallas. The season was to start in February 1960 and run until late May and expressed plans to use retired and off-season players from the Rams and the 49ers. The NARFL, however, did not materialize.
- Born:
  - Susanna Hoffs, American singer for The Bangles, in Los Angeles
  - Momoe Yamaguchi, Japanese singer and actress, in Tokyo

== January 18, 1959 (Sunday) ==
- The 1960 Democratic National Convention was awarded to Los Angeles, beating out bids by San Francisco, Miami, Philadelphia, Chicago and New York.

== January 19, 1959 (Monday) ==
- While President of Argentina Arturo Frondizi went to Washington for an official visit, a general strike paralyzed the South American nation. The vice-president, José María Guido, took advantage of the president's absence and proclaimed a state of siege, ordering repressive measures against Peronists and communists.
- Sgt. Richard G. Corden, who had been captured as a POW in the Korean War and then chose to live in Communist China rather than to return to the United States, returned to the United States after an 8-year absence.

== January 20, 1959 (Tuesday) ==
- Soviet Foreign Minister Anastas Mikoyan returned to Moscow after a controversial 17-day tour of the United States.

== January 21, 1959 (Wednesday) ==
- The European Court of Human Rights was established.
- The screening of records for prospective Project Mercury astronauts began.
- Born:
  - Alex McLeish, footballer for Birmingham City and later Scotland national team manager, in Barrhead
  - Paulo Miklos, Brazilian musician and actor, in São Paulo
- Died:
  - Cecil B. DeMille, 78, American movie producer and director, died at his home after a short illness. At the time of his passing, DeMille was reportedly working on plans for an epic film about the Boy Scouts, followed by a secret project that he only described as "something entirely different".
  - Carl "Alfalfa" Switzer, 31, former American child actor known for the Little Rascals, was shot and killed in North Hollywood during a fight with Bud Stilz, whom Switzer confronted over a claimed debt. Switzer, 31, had recently been in the Tony Curtis film The Defiant Ones. An inquiry concluded that Stilz had acted in self-defense.

== January 22, 1959 (Thursday) ==
- In the Italian Chamber of Deputies, there was a harsh confrontation between the Fanfani cabinet and opposition members, of right and of left, about the "Giuffrè affair" (arising from the so-called "God's banker" Giovan Battista Giuffrè, creator of a Ponzi scheme under the cover of a society financing pious works). A motion approving the actions of the ministers Giulio Andreotti and Luigi Preti passed with a one-vote majority. Fanfani and his government resigned four days later.
- Twelve coal miners died when water breached the River Slope Mine in Port Griffith, Pennsylvania.

== January 23, 1959 (Friday) ==
- Wernher von Braun predicted that men would be living and working on the moon by 1974, fifteen years hence. He added that "The Russians could put a man on the moon this year. But they couldn't get him back."
- On the same day, United States Postmaster General Arthur E. Summerfield announced a serious proposal for the mail to be delivered "by guided missile". Summerfield, who, in 1955, had successfully changed corner mail boxes from olive drab to red, white and blue, added that "If Congress provides us with sufficient funds, you may be assured that mail-carrying rocket missiles will be painted with the traditional colors-- red, white and blue-- of which every American is justly proud."
- Funds in the amount of $1,556,200 were made available to the Langley Research Center for the Little Joe development program. The remaining funds of total program costs ($3,946,000) had already been made available to Langley in a previous transfer of funds.
- Died: English race car driver Mike Hawthorn, 29, was killed in an accident

== January 24, 1959 (Saturday) ==
- Walter Stolle of Germany began what would become the longest bicycle tour on record. Over nearly 18 years, ending on December 12, 1976, he rode more than 402,000 miles (647,000 km) in 159 countries, before retiring at age 50.
- In Rome, celebrations were held in observance of the 1,900th anniversary of St. Paul's Epistle to the Romans.

== January 25, 1959 (Sunday) ==
- Pope John XXIII announced his plans to convene the Second Vatican Council (Vatican II), in Rome. The call for a worldwide gathering of up to 2,500 Catholic cardinals, archbishops and bishops followed a Sunday mass in honor of St. Paul.
- The Project Mercury pilot egress trainer was received from McDonnell and rough water evaluation of the equipment was started immediately by Space Task Group personnel.
- The first American passenger jet service began as an American Airlines Boeing 707 flew from Los Angeles to New York City. Among the 112 passengers was poet Carl Sandburg, who said, "We salute the intelligence and the daring of man that has wrought this strange and blessed device, now so familiarly known as the passenger jet plane." After California's First Lady, Bernice Brown, pushed the button to start the engines, Captain C.A. McAtee took off at 9:01 a.m. and arrived in New York 4 hours, 3 minutes later. Captain Hamilton Smith then flew the jet and its 112 passengers back to Los Angeles.
- Born:
  - Toni Servillo, Italian actor, in Afragola
  - Francesco Storace, Italian extreme right politician, in Cassino

== January 26, 1959 (Monday) ==
- Italy's Prime Minister Amintore Fanfani resigned along with his coalition government after opposition by deputies of his own Democrazia Cristiana Party to his seven-month-old coalition with the Social Democrats. Fanfani resigned as leader of his party and was replaced by Antonio Segni, who would form a new government on February 16.
- Hearings opened in the U.S. Congress on a bill to admit Hawaii as the 50th state. Secretary of the Interior Fred Seaton testified in favor of the legislation, endorsed by House Democratic Leader John McCormack.
- NASA completed contract negotiations with McDonnell for the design and development of the Mercury spacecraft. At that time, McDonnell estimated that the first 3 spacecraft could be delivered in 10 months. Spacecraft refinements slipped this estimated goal by only 2 months.

== January 27, 1959 (Tuesday) ==
- The 21st Congress of the Communist Party of the Soviet Union opened at Sverdlovsky Hall in Moscow as Nikita Khrushchev welcomed 1,500 delegates, including Communist leaders from 70 nations. For the first time, Western reporters were admitted to the conclave, held for the first time since 1956.
- In Florence, a 20-day long sit-in strike at the Galileo optical instruments factory was forcibly broken up by police, and the factory owners announced an immediate layoff of 980 employees who had supported the strikers. A dozen people were injured and 10 arrested in rioting that afternoon. Four days later, after an intervention by bishop Ermenegildo Fiorit, the Galileo management reversed its decision to fire the employees.
- NASA Administrator T. Keith Glennan disclosed that the first 110 candidates had been selected for the first American in space, and that he believed that man would land on the moon by 1969. Scientist Eugen Sänger of Stuttgart predicted that man might be able to approach the speed of light by 1999, reaching a speed of 670 million miles per hour.
- The Convair 880 jet airliner made its first flight, taking off from San Diego and returning after two hours. The jet, fastest up to that time, got its name from its speed of 880 feet per second (600 m.p.h.), but the planes had high operational costs and complicated electrical systems. The last was flown in 1975.

== January 28, 1959 (Wednesday) ==
- Despite a ban on political parties other than Francisco Franco's ruling Falange, 100 people, including army officers, businessmen and professors, formed the Unión Española in Spain.
- American scientists at NASA announced that data from the Vanguard 1 satellite had shown that the Earth was not completely round, but actually "a little pear-shaped". The announcement was made at a press conference at the American Physical Society by Dr. J. A. O'Keefe and scientists Ann Eckels and R. K. Squires of the National Aeronautics and Space Administration. The differences were slight, but Vanguard data showed differences of sea level around the North Pole being 50 feet (15 m) higher, and that around Antarctica being 50 feet (15 m) lower than previously believed.
- In Durango, Mexico, actress Audrey Hepburn was severely injured, breaking four vertebrae in her back, when she was thrown from a horse while filming a Western. According to news reports, "Camera trouble developed, and when someone yelled 'Cut!', the horse stopped abruptly. She went over the horse's head." Hepburn recovered, and The Unforgiven would be released in 1960.
- Born: Patrizio Oliva, Italian boxer and 1980 Olympic gold medalist; WBA light welterweight world champion 1986 to 1987; in Naples
- Died: Walter Beall, 59, American baseball player

== January 29, 1959 (Thursday) ==
- Dense smog rolled into London, Manchester, and Birmingham at concentrations worse than the first day of the Great Smog of 1952. Unlike 1952, when 3,500 persons died, shifting winds dissipated the yellow cloud after three days.
- The Little Joe flight test program was drafted. This plan would be updated on April 14, 1959. Primary objectives of the test were to investigate flight dynamics, check drogue parachute operations, determine physiological effects of acceleration on a small primate, and, to some extent, check the spacecraft aerodynamic characteristics.
- Buena Vista Pictures released Walt Disney's animated film Sleeping Beauty.

== January 30, 1959 (Friday) ==
- The Danish ship MS Hans Hedtoft, returning to Copenhagen with 95 people on board after its maiden voyage to Greenland, struck an iceberg and sank off of the coast of Greenland.
- Admiral Arleigh Burke, Chief of Naval Operations, advised Dr. T. Keith Glennan that U.S. Navy candidates for Project Mercury had started in the first selection process.
- Born: Jody Watley, American R&B singer, in Chicago

== January 31, 1959 (Saturday) ==
- Domenico Modugno won the Sanremo Music Festival, with his song "Piove (Ciao, ciao bambina)". Baritone Arturo Testa was second with "Io sono il vento" ("I Am the Wind").
- The Virginia General Assembly gave up on further attempts to block the integration of state schools, clearing the way for schools in Norfolk to reopen for the first time in more than four months. The district had shut down the schools on September 15 rather than enroll 17 African Americans, while schools in Arlington were integrated after Chief Justice Earl Warren denied a motion to delay the process there. Mixed classes began on Monday, February 2.
- Born:
  - Kelly Lynch, American model and actress, in Golden Valley, Minnesota
  - Kelly Moore, American NASCAR driver and 1995 North Series champion; in Scarborough, Maine
