= Government of the Republic of the Rif =

Tribal Federal government of the Republic of the Rif

Rif Republic Federal Government
- State Emblem
- Formation: 1921; 105 years ago
- Founding document: Government of the Rif Republic; Declaration of State and Proclamation to all Nations
- Jurisdiction: Confederal Republic of the Tribes of the Rif

Legislative branch
- Legislature: Congress of Representatives of the Tribes of the Rif
- Meeting place: Ajdir

Executive branch
- Leader: President (Moulay Mohand)
- Appointer: Tribes of the Rif
- Main organ: Cabinet of the Rif

Judicial branch
- Court: Supreme Court of the Republic of the Rif

The Government of the Republic of the Rif was established on 18 September 1921 when the Riffian Tribes, led by Abd el-Krim, beat Spain in the Battle of Annual during the Rif War and created the Confederal Republic of the Tribes of the Rif.

The Republic of the Rif is considered the first-ever independent non-monarchical modern Amazigh state.

After the Riffian victory, President Abd el-Krim and his Council of Ministers issued a document titled "Government of the Rif Republic; Declaration of State and Proclamation to all Nations" declaring the independence of the Rif from the Franco-Spanish colonial dominion and from the Arab-Alouite Sultan Yusef of Morocco.

== The federal government of the Republic of the Rif ==
=== Executive branch ===
- President: Moulay Mohand Abd el-Krim el-Khattabi
- Prime Minister: Hajj Hatmi
- President of the Council of Ministers: AbdelSelam Mohammed el-Khattabi
- Minister of Justice: Mohammed Echems
- Minister of Interior: Shaikh Yazid n-Hajj Hammu
- Minister of War: Mohammed ben Omar
- Minister of Foreign Affairs: Mohammed Azerkan
- Minister of Religious Affairs: Mohand n' Ali El Ouakili

=== Symbolic Offices ===
- Princess (Lalla) of the Rif: Lalla Mimouna Boujibar
- Imam Prince of the Believers (ʾamīr al-muʾminīn): Moulay Mohand Abd el-Krim el-Khattabi

=== Legislative branch ===
- Congress of Representatives of the Tribes of the Rif
