= Rifian =

Riffian or Rifian may refer to:

== Morocco ==
- Riffians, a Berber people
- Riffian language, their language
- Rif, a mountainous area of Morocco
- Riffan, proposed official currency of the Republic of the Rif

== Italy ==
- Riffian, South Tyrol, a municipality

== Film ==
- Rififi, a 1955 French film
