= Francoist concentration camps =

Aspect of the Spanish Civil War

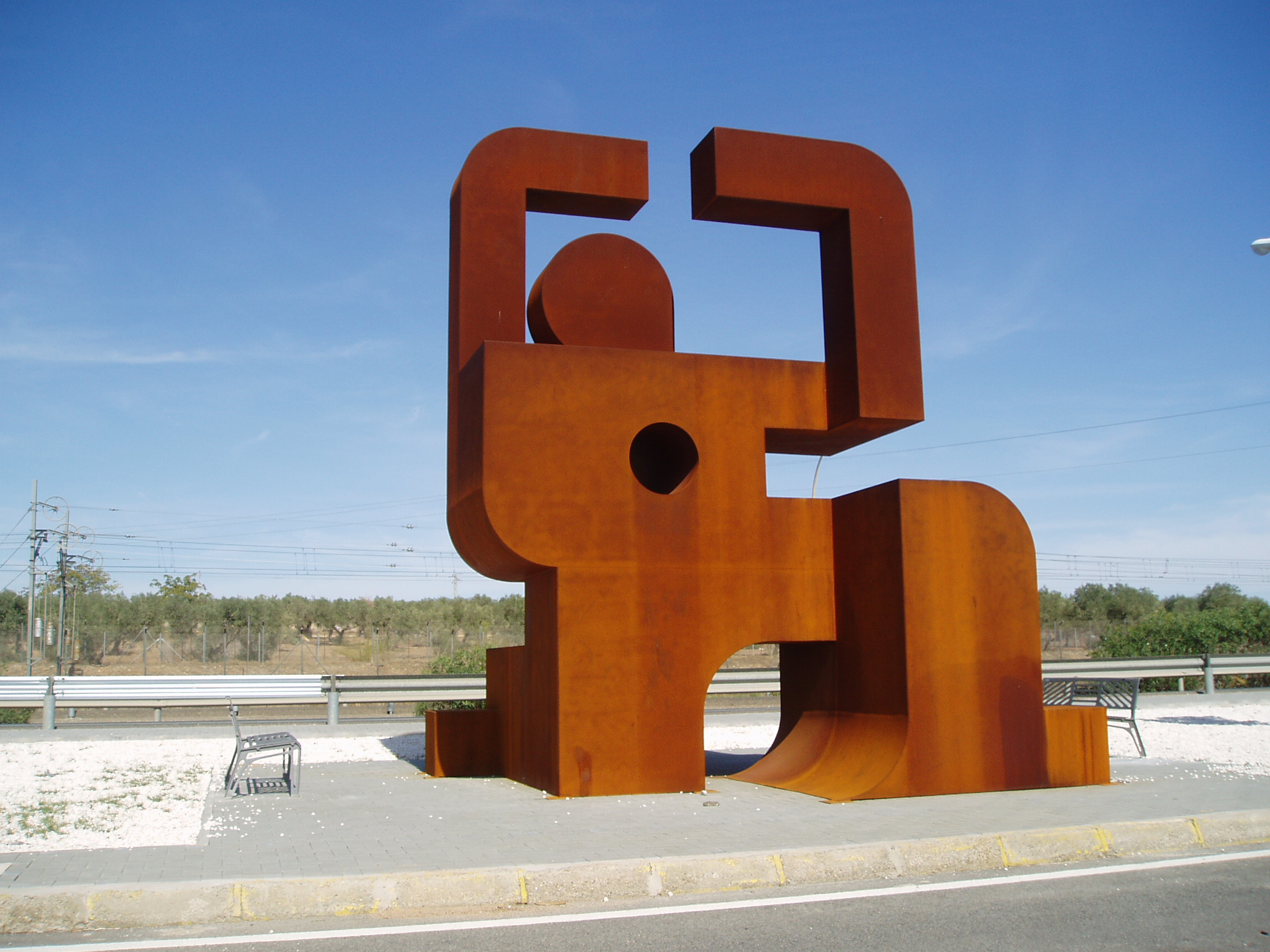
Memorial monument to the political prisoners who built the Bajo Guadalquivir channel

In Francoist Spain, at least two to three hundred concentration camps operated from 1936 until 1947, some permanent and many others temporary. The network of camps was an instrument of Franco's repression.

People such as Republican ex-combatants of the People's Army, the Air Force and the Navy, to political dissidents and their families, the poor, Moroccan separatists, homosexuals, Romani people and common prisoners ended up in these camps. The Classified Commissions that operated within the camps determined the fate of those interned: those that were declared "recoverable" were released; the "minority disaffected" and without political responsibility were sent to the workers' battalions; and the "seriously disaffected" were sent to prison and were under the order of the War Audit to be prosecuted by military court. Those classified as "common criminals" were also sent to prison. The "non-recoverable" were shot. According to the official numbers of the Inspectorate of Concentration Camps of Prisoners, at the end of the Spanish Civil War, 177,905 enemy soldiers were imprisoned in the approximately 100 existing camps and were detained pending trial classification. The Inspectorate also reported that until then, 431,251 people had passed through the camps.

As in many other concentration camps, the prisoners were ranked so that ordinary violent prisoners (those without political or ideological motivations) were a step higher than most of those who were locked up, working as "guards" (cabos de vara), over the others. Despite the massive destruction of documentation on the camps, studies claim that some of them were characterized by the labor exploitation of prisoners, organized in workers' battalions.

There is consensus among historians to confirm, according to testimonies of survivors, witnesses, and the Franco reports themselves, that the conditions of internment “were, in general, atrocious”. Added to this is the fact that the rebels did not recognize Republican soldiers as prisoners of war, so that the Geneva Convention of 1929, signed years earlier by King Alfonso XIII on behalf of Spain, did not apply to them. Illegality in the treatment of prisoners materialized in the use of prisoners for military work (explicitly prohibited by the convention), widespread preventive detention (internment without conviction), use of torture to obtain testimonies and denunciations, and absence of judicial guarantees. With regard to the official administration of the camps, widespread corruption, which enabled the enrichment of many military personnel and aggravated the suffering of inmates in their custody, has also been highlighted.

== History ==
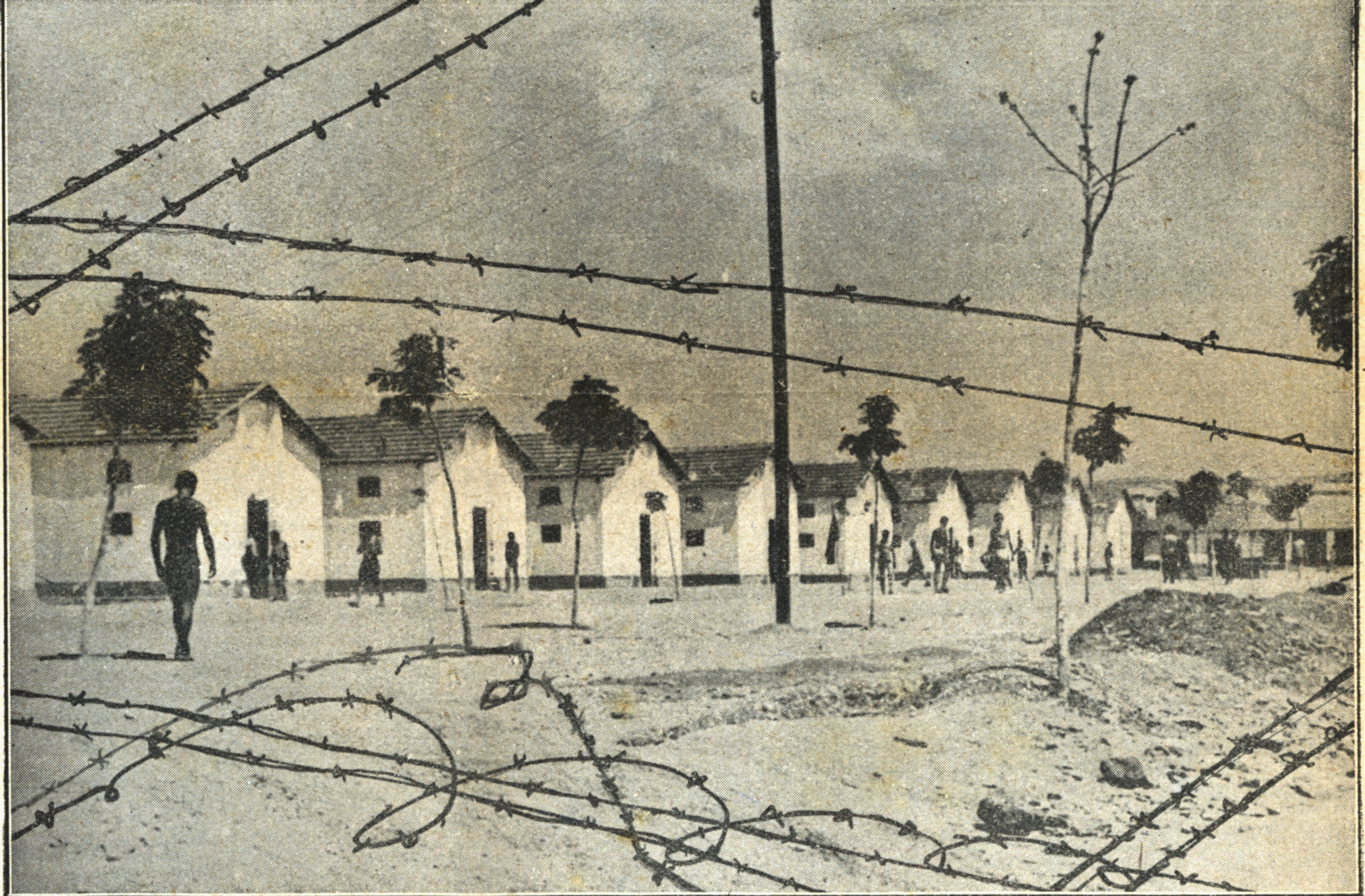
Miranda de Ebro concentration camp in 1943

According to Javier Rodrigo, about half a million prisoners passed through the concentration camps between 1936 and 1942. In 2019, Carlos Hernández de Miguel identified about 300 confirmed camps, estimating that between 700,000 and 1 million people would have passed through them. Paul Preston found nearly 200 total camps that more than 400,000 prisoners would have passed through.

The first concentration camp was created by the rebel military on July 19, 1936, hours after the uprising, near Melilla; the next day, the Rif Telegram reported the opening of the camp, located in the Alcazaba of Zeluán (an old fortress from the 17th century). Francisco Franco was immediately informed of this, demonstrating enthusiasm and ordered the opening of more camps to harbor the “disturbing elements” and employ them in public jobs. On July 20, the future dictator told colonel Eduardo Sáenz de Buruaga who was in command of the city of Tetuán: “I have been informed that there are several hundred detainees and that the prisons cannot provide for them. In light of the inflow of foreign correspondents, to avoid the outskirts of Tetuán becoming a spectacle of our new shootings, a solution must be sought out which could be concentration camps on the outskirts. (...) In Melilla, they have already opened one in Zeluán with good results”. Thus was born the concentration camp of El Mogote, in a suitable location to hide the harshness of its conditions from abroad (on August 20, 52 prisoners would be killed, with Franco well-informed).

The next region in which the rebels established concentration camps was the Canary Islands in consonance with the control of the Spanish territory of the rebel army. Specifically, it was on the military grounds of the La Isleta peninsula, in Gran Canaria, operating until the end of July 1936. An undetermined number of prisoners from the Canarian camps ended up being thrown into the sea or into volcanic wells. As in North Africa, the nationalist press concealed the harshness and crimes committed in the camps, offering them an idyllic image far removed from reality. Other detention centers opened shortly after the beginning of the war, such as the military prison located in Mount Hacho de Ceuta Castle, have been considered concentration camps, although they have never been officially named.

Some historians have pointed to Nazi officials of the Gestapo as the organizers of the network of Francoist concentration camps, and for the design of the Spaniard camps, they were largely inspired by the concentration camps of Nazi Germany itself. Among those Nazi officers, Paul Winzer, especially stood out as the head of the Gestapo in Spain and the head of the Miranda de Ebro concentration camp for some time. There are authors who go further and even maintain that Winzer was the true author of the entire organization of the Francoist concentration camps. On the other hand, other facilities, such as the Laredo, Castro Urdiales, Santander and El Dueso, were initially enabled and managed by battalions of the Corpo Truppe Volontarie of Fascist Italy.

On July 5, 1937, the General Inspectorate of the Concentration Camps of Prisoners (ICCP) was created with Colonel Luis Martín Pinillos, an Africanist soldier, at helm. Its objective was to centralize the management of all the camps, although it would conflict with the different military chiefs of other parts of the country, especially with General Queipo de Llano, responsible for the Army of the South. The Andalusian camps operated outside the ICCP until mid-1938, and those of the Balearic Islands, the Canary Islands or the Protectorate of Morocco retained almost total autonomy until the end of the war.

In 1938, Franco's concentration camps housed more than 170,000 prisoners, large part of them prisoners of war of the Spanish Republican Army. After the end of the war, in 1939 the prison population ranged from 367,000 to 500,000 including soldiers and brigadist of the Spanish Republican Army. Since 1940 the supervisor of all these camps had been General Camilo Alonso Vega. The main function of the camps was to retain as many republican prisoners of war as possible, and all those who were described as “unrecoverable” were automatically executed. Many of those in charge of those in charge of administration in the camps had been victims in the Republican zone, and therefore stood out for demonstrating a will of fury and revenge with the defeated. Nor did high-ranking officials show much opposition to this climate of repression and revenge: The Director-General of Prisoners, Máximo Cuervo Radigales, and the head of the Military Legal Corps, Lorenzo Martínez Fuset, contributed in no small way to this repressive environment.

In 1946, ten years after the start of the Civil War, 137 labor camps and 3 concentration camps, in which 30,000 political prisoners were being held, were still operational. The last concentration camp to close was Miranda de Ebro on January 13th, 1947.

=== Treatment of inmates ===
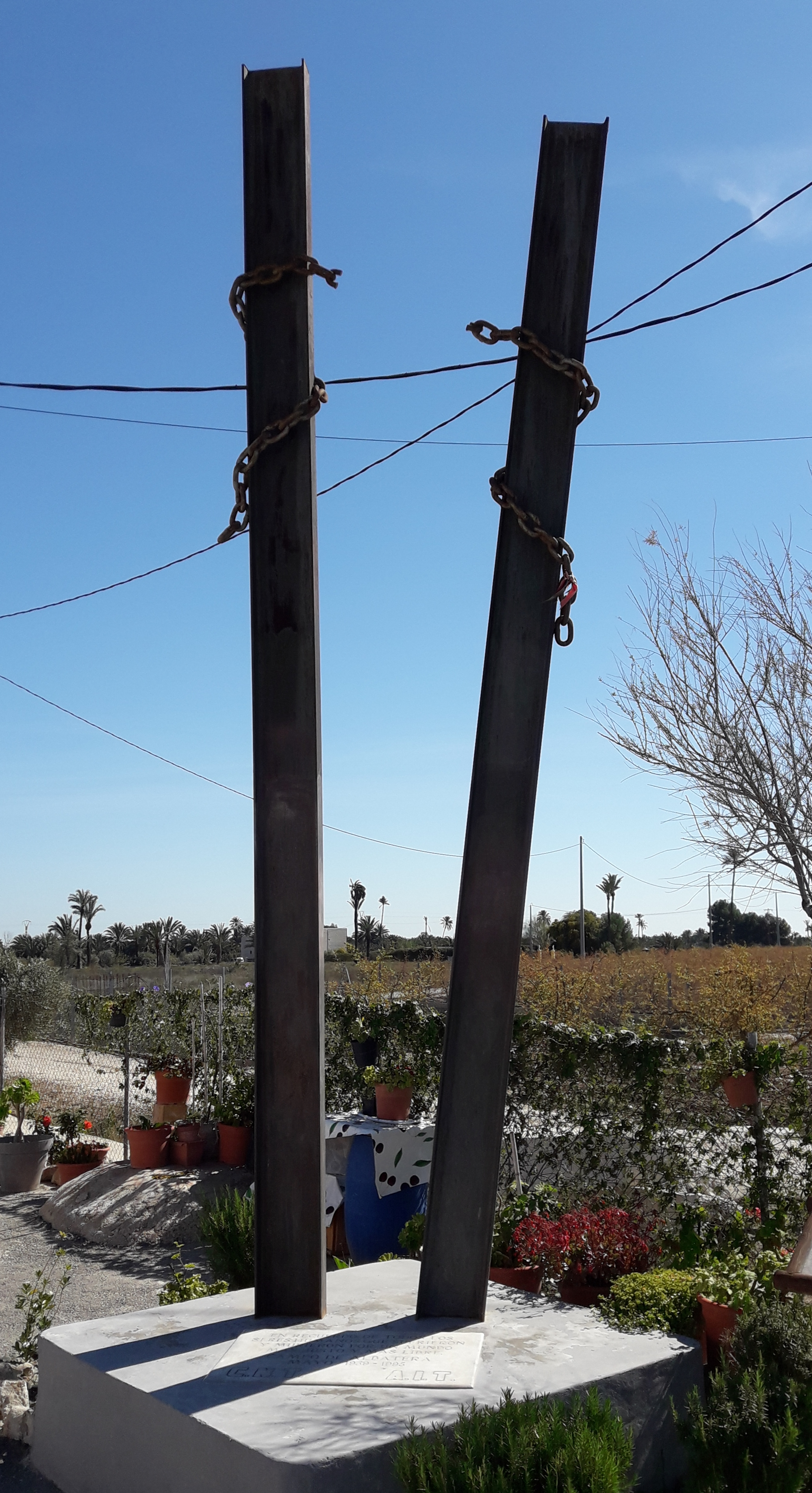
Memorial set up in 1995 nearby San Isidro, Alicante, dedicated to the victims of Albatera concentration camp

Torture and ill-treatment were a normal part of the day in the concentration camps where the inmates – many of them without having been formally charged with any crime– endured deplorable living conditions marked by “shortages, disease, overcrowding, and corruption”. It was not uncommon for those who beat prisoners to be Falangists or relatives of victims, who were allowed into the establishment. The inmates were subjected to brutal punishments by those who guarded them (many of them ex-combatants, ex-captives or relatives of victims of repression during the Republican rearguard) or by the cabos de vara that reappeared in the concentration camps and also the prison setting. Concentration camp prisoners described as “disaffected” were also forced to perform forced labor in battalions formed for that purpose.

=== Deportation of Spanish exiles and Civil War brigades to Nazi camps ===
Apart from the concentration camps in Spain, it is alleged that in the exile of Republicans to France around 10,000 Spaniards ended up in Nazi concentration camps, without Francisco Franco's foreign minister, Ramón Serrano Suñer, doing anything to save them. There is written documentation by which the Germans asked what to do with the "two thousand Spanish reds of Angouleme". The few who were saved could not return to Spain.

On the other hand, the Franco authorities also collaborated with their Nazi allies by handing over Czech, Belgian, or German prisoners to be shot or held in prisons and concentration camps of the Third Reich, where most of them perished. These deliveries were personally ordered by Franco, against the judgement of his own officials and violating any legal principle. Minister Gómez-Jordana wrote by hand on the highly diplomatic report, ignoring their arguments: "His Excellency, General-in-Chief ordered them to surrender”.

In the San Pedro camp, the international brigade members were also exchanged for prisoners who were held in the hands of the Republican authorities. Although only a small number of these barters of soldiers are known, some soldiers of Nazi Germany and Italian Fascists managed to return to their countries of origin in this way.

== See also ==
- Francoist repression
- Labour battalion
- Movimiento Nacional
- National Catholicism

== Bibliography ==
- Beevor, Antony (2006). The Battle for Spain. The Spanish Civil War, 1936-1939. London: Penguin Books. ISBN 9780143037651.
- Benz, Wolfgang; Graml, Hermman (1986). Europa después de la Segunda Guerra Mundial 1945-1982.
- Casanova, Julián (2015). "La dictadura que salió de la guerra". In Julián Casanova (ed.). Cuarenta años con Franco. Barcelona: Crítica. pp. 53–77. ISBN 978-84-9892-791-7.
- De Riquer, Borja (2010). La dictadura de Franco. Vol. 9 de la Historia de España, dirigida por Josep Fontana y Ramón Villares. Barcelona: Crítica/Marcial Pons. ISBN 978-84-9892-063-5.
- Egido León, María de los Ángeles (2005). Los Campos de Concentración Franquistas en el Contexto Europeo. Marcial Pons Ediciones de Historia.
- Graham, Helen (2005). The Spanish Civil War. A very short introduction. Oxford University Press.
- Gutiérrez Casalá, J. L. (2003). Colonias penitenciarias militarizadas de Montijo: represión franquista en el partido judicial de Mérida. Mérida: Editora Regional de Extremadura.
- Hernández de Miguel, Carlos (2019). Los campos de concentración de Franco: Sometimiento, torturas y muerte tras las alambradas (in Spanish). Penguin Random House. ISBN 978-84-666-6478-3.
- Juliá, Santos (2000). "La sociedad". In José Luis García Delgado (ed.). Franquismo. El juicio de la historia. Madrid: Temas de Hoy. pp. 57–114. ISBN 84-8460-070-X.
- Lorenzo Rubio, César (2020). "La máquina represiva: la tortura en el franquismo". In Pedro Oliver Olmo (ed.). La tortura en la España contemporánea. Madrid: Los Libros de la Catarata. pp. 131–198. ISBN 978-84-1352-077-3.
- Molinero, C.; Sala, M.; Sobrequés i Callicó, J. (2003). Una inmensa prisión: los campos de concentración y las prisiones durante la guerra civil y el franquismo. Crítica contrastes. Barcelona: Crítica.
- Núñez Díaz-Balart, M. (2004). Los años del terror: la estrategia de dominio y represión del general Franco (1 ed.). Madrid: Esfera de los Libros.
- Oviedo Silva, Daniel (2020). "Violencia masiva y tortura en la guerra civil". In Pedro Oliver Olmo (ed.). La tortura en la España contemporánea. Madrid: Los Libros de la Catarata. pp. 85–130. ISBN 978-84-1352-077-3.
- Preston, Paul (2006). The Spanish Civil War: Reaction, Revolution and Revenge. Harper Perennial. ISBN 0007232071.
- Rodríguez González, Javier; Berzal de la Rosa, Enrique; Pablo Lobo, Carlos de; Sierra Gómez, Carlos de la; Delgado Cruz, Severiano; Vega Sombría, Santiago; Revilla Casado, Javier (2011). Cárceles y Campos de Concentración en Castilla y León. León: Fundación 27 de marzo. ISBN 978-84-615-5410-2.
- Rodrigo, Javier (2003). Los campos de concentración franquistas: entre la historia y la memoria. Madrid: Siete Mares.
- Rodrigo, J. (2005). Cautivos: campos de concentración en la España franquista, 1936-1947. Barcelona: Crítica.
- Rodrigo, J. (2006). "Internamiento y trabajo forzoso: los campos de concentración de franco" (PDF). Hispania Nova, Revista de historia contemporánea. 6, Separata.
- Rodrigo, J. (2008). Hasta la raíz: violencia durante la Guerra Civil y la dictadura franquista. Alianza Editorial.
- Thomas, Hugh (1993) [1976]. Historia de la Guerra Civil Española.
