= Riffan =

Currency of the Republic of the Rif

ريفان
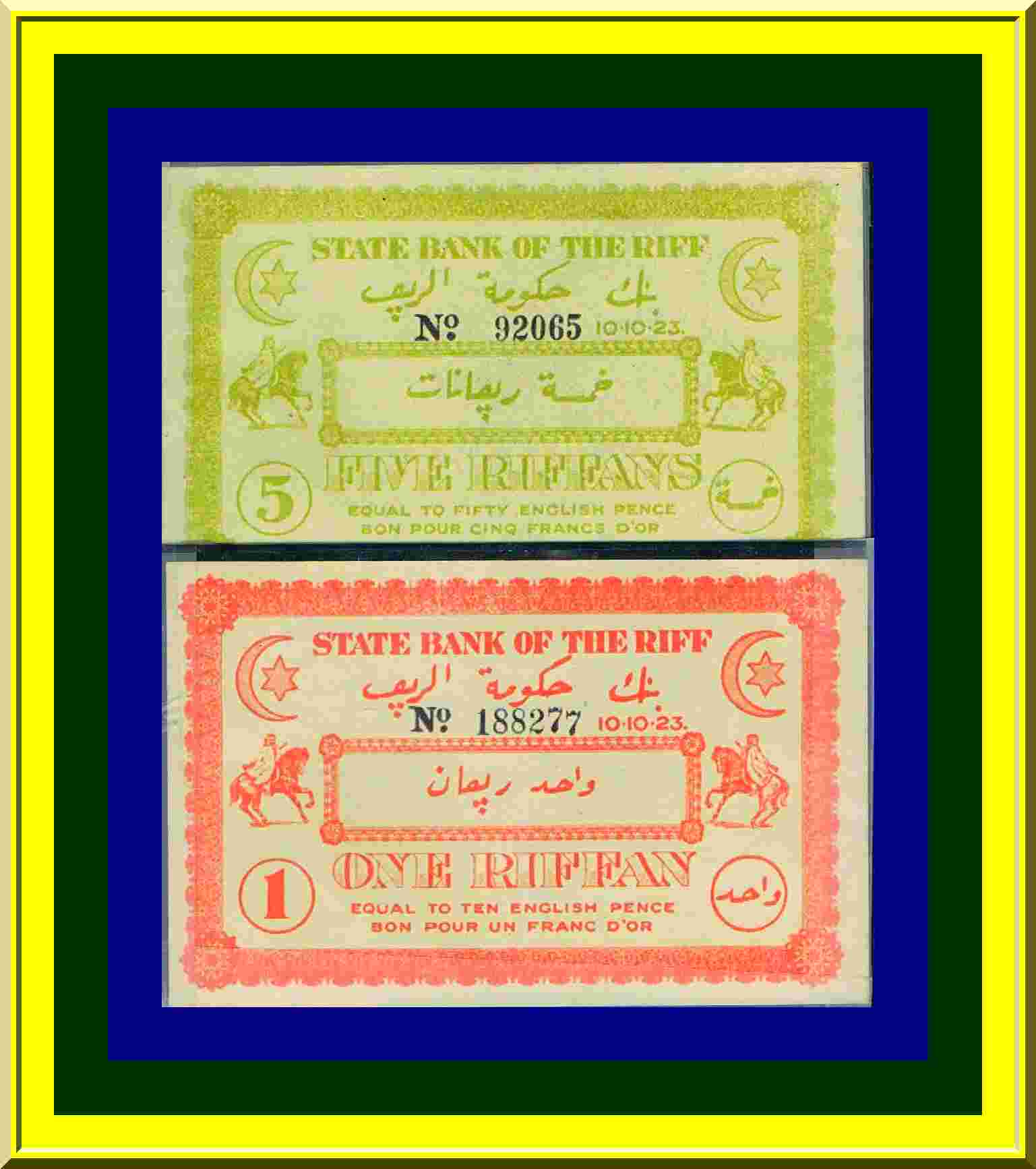
- 1 and 5 banknotes from 1923

Units of account
- Plural: Riffans

Denominations
- Banknotes: 1, 5, Riffan

Demographics
- User(s): Republic of the Rif

Issuance
- Central bank: State Bank of the Riff
- This infobox shows the latest status before this currency was rendered obsolete.

Officially called the Riffan (Arabic: ريفان) was the proposed official currency of the Republic of the Rif, a short-lived state in northern Morocco that existed between 1921 and 1926. While banknotes were designed and printed in 1923, the currency never reached general circulation due to the military collapse of the Republic following the joint French-Spanish intervention.

== History ==
During the Rif War, resistance leader Abd el-Krim sought to modernize the administration of the newly declared Republic. Central to this was the establishment of a national financial system to assert sovereignty and move away from the Spanish peseta and Moroccan franc. In 1923, Abd el-Krim authorized the creation of the State Bank of the Riff. However, historical records suggest the bank and its notes were largely the project of Captain Charles Alfred Percy Gardiner, a British adventurer and arms smuggler. Gardiner claimed to have been appointed by Abd el-Krim to manage the Republic's finances, though some historians believe the currency project was a private venture intended to facilitate his own trade in the region.

== Denominations and design ==
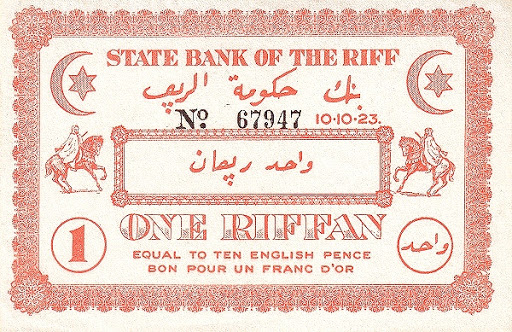
One Riffan

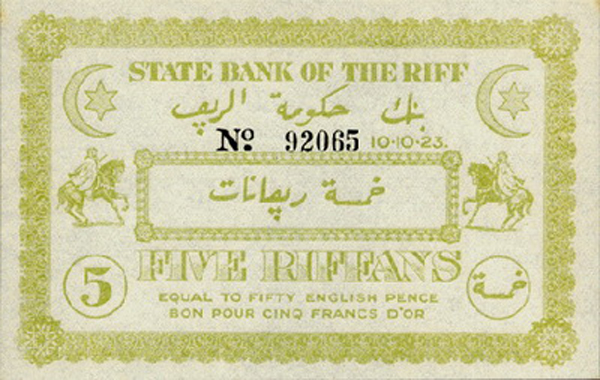
Five Riffans

The currency was pegged to the British pound and the gold franc. Only two denominations were produced, both as uniface (printed on one side) paper banknotes: 1 Riffan: Equivalent to 10 British pence or 1 Gold Franc. 5 Riffans: Equivalent to 50 British pence or 5 Gold Francs. Visual Features The banknotes featured a distinct "emergency currency". The notes included the inscription: "State Bank of the Riff– Bon pour un franc d'or – Equal to ten english pence." Aesthetic Imagery: The notes depicted a Riffan horseman carrying a rifle, flanked by a star and crescent.The banknote also features the word "ريڥان" which uses the letter ڥ (V) instead of the letter ف (F), which might indicate a misspelling. Languages: The text was multilingual, appearing in English, French, and Arabic, reflecting the Republic's desire for international recognition.

== Legacy and Numismatics ==
Because the Riffan never officially entered circulation, the notes remained in storage or in the hands of collectors. Following the surrender of Abd el-Krim in 1926, the Spanish and French colonial administrations suppressed all symbols of the Republic, including its planned financial instruments. Today, Riffan banknotes are extremely rare and highly prized by numismatists. They are considered "local banknotes" or "rebel currency" and often appear in specialized auctions, serving as a primary artifact of the Riffan independence movement.
