= Labour battalion =

Form of alternative service or unfree labour

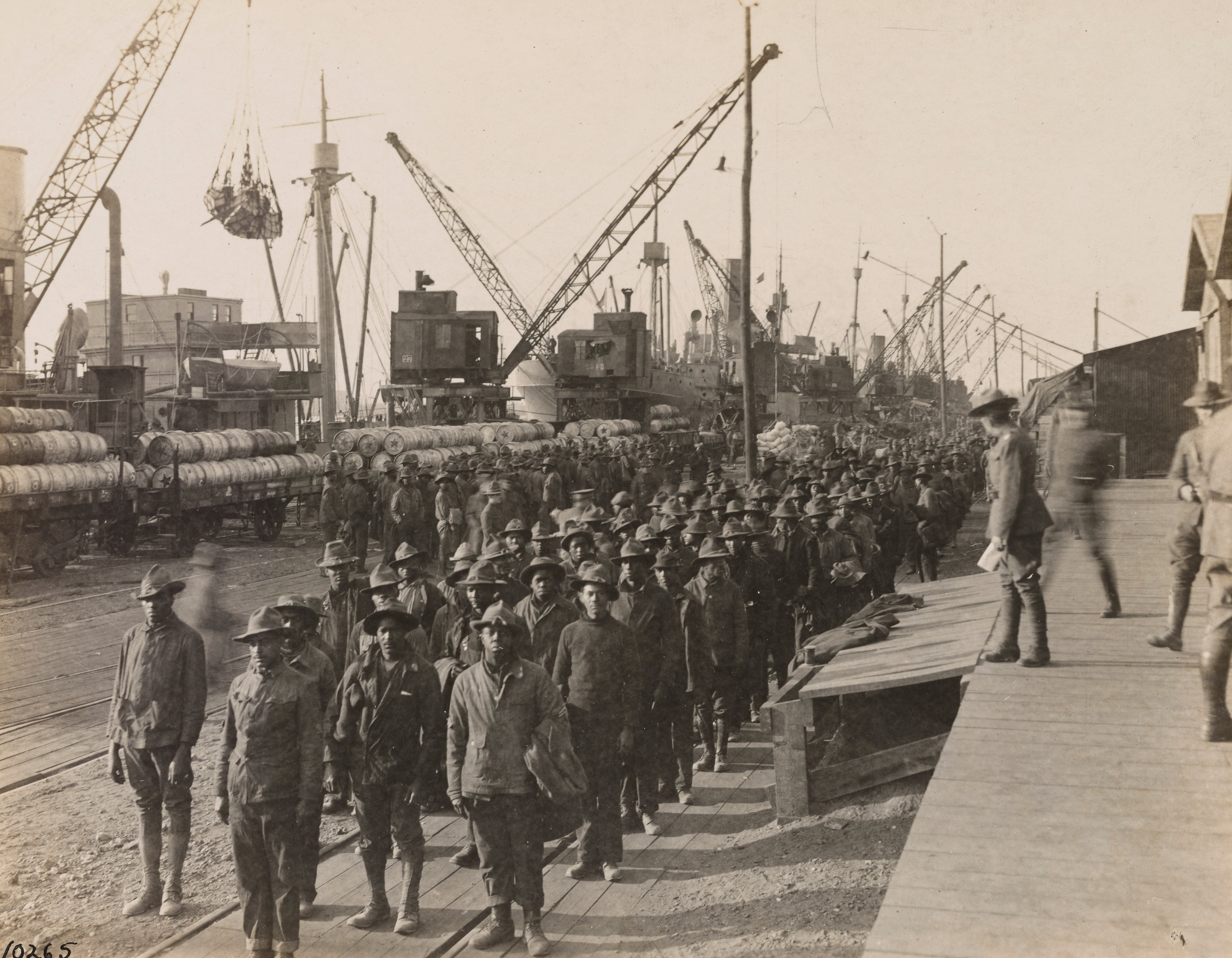
U.S. Stevedore regiment, Bassens Docks, Bordeaux, April 1918.

Labour battalions have been a form of alternative service or unfree labour in various countries in lieu of or resembling regular military service. In some cases they were the result of some kind of discriminative segregation of the population, while in some others they have been a conscious choice.

== Political reasons ==
In some countries labour battalions were created from parts of populations which for various reasons were not suitable for regular military service, often because this population was considered "undesirable" or "unreliable", e.g., political enemies, population of occupied territories or "lower races".

Examples include labour battalions in the late Ottoman Empire and early Turkish Republic both during World War I and during World War II, labour service in Hungary during World War II, labour battalions established by Francoist Spain (estimated in 700 labour units overall, excluding the approximately 300 concentration camps) during the Spanish Civil War as a form of repression of political enemies that continued through the dictatorship, as well as labour battalions in other territories held by Nazi Germany and its allies (see also "Hiwi").

== Alternative service ==
In some countries labour battalions are a form of civil conscription instead of military conscription for people who cannot join military service for various reasons, e.g., due to bad health or being conscientious objectors to any forms of violence, as long as they aren't considered unfit for other work.

In the British Army during the First World War, labour or pioneer battalions were initially formed in December 1914 from recruits with skilled trades or experience in manual labour, trained to fight as infantry but usually used to build trenches and carry out other manual labour. Early in 1916 these began to also include men not assessed as fit enough to fight to carry out a similar role and were sometimes also known as Infantry Works Battalions. Initially assigned to individual regiments, the existing Labour and Infantry Works battalions were grouped together in February 1917 to form the new Labour Corps.

Until the last days of the Soviet Union with obligatory military duty in the state, men deemed unfit to regular military duty but not unfit for other work, as well as many able-bodied ones, were assigned to construction battalions (стройбаты) of the Soviet Army. Similar armed forces branches existed in other Eastern European countries throughout the communist period between the end of World War II and the end of the 1980s. An interesting example are the Bulgarian Construction Troops (Строителни Войски), first established in 1920 to circumvent the limits on the size of the military imposed by the Treaty of Neuilly-Sur-Seine at the end of World War I. Over the years this branch became a blend of a corps of engineers and a means for some to fulfill the mandatory conscription in place during communism in the country.

== See also ==
- Bevin Boys in the United Kingdom from 1943 to 1948
- Bausoldat in East Germany
- Civil conscription
- Civilian Conservation Corps as a public work relief program in the United States from 1933 to 1942
- Gdud HaAvoda, 'Labour Battalion', voluntary Zionist group in British Palestine
- Hand and hitch-up services
- Labour army
- Labour camp
- Reichsarbeitsdienst in Nazi Germany from 1933 to 1945
- Workfare
