= Abd el-Krim =

Moroccan political and military leader (1882/1883–1963)

- Ɛebdelkrim عبد الكريم
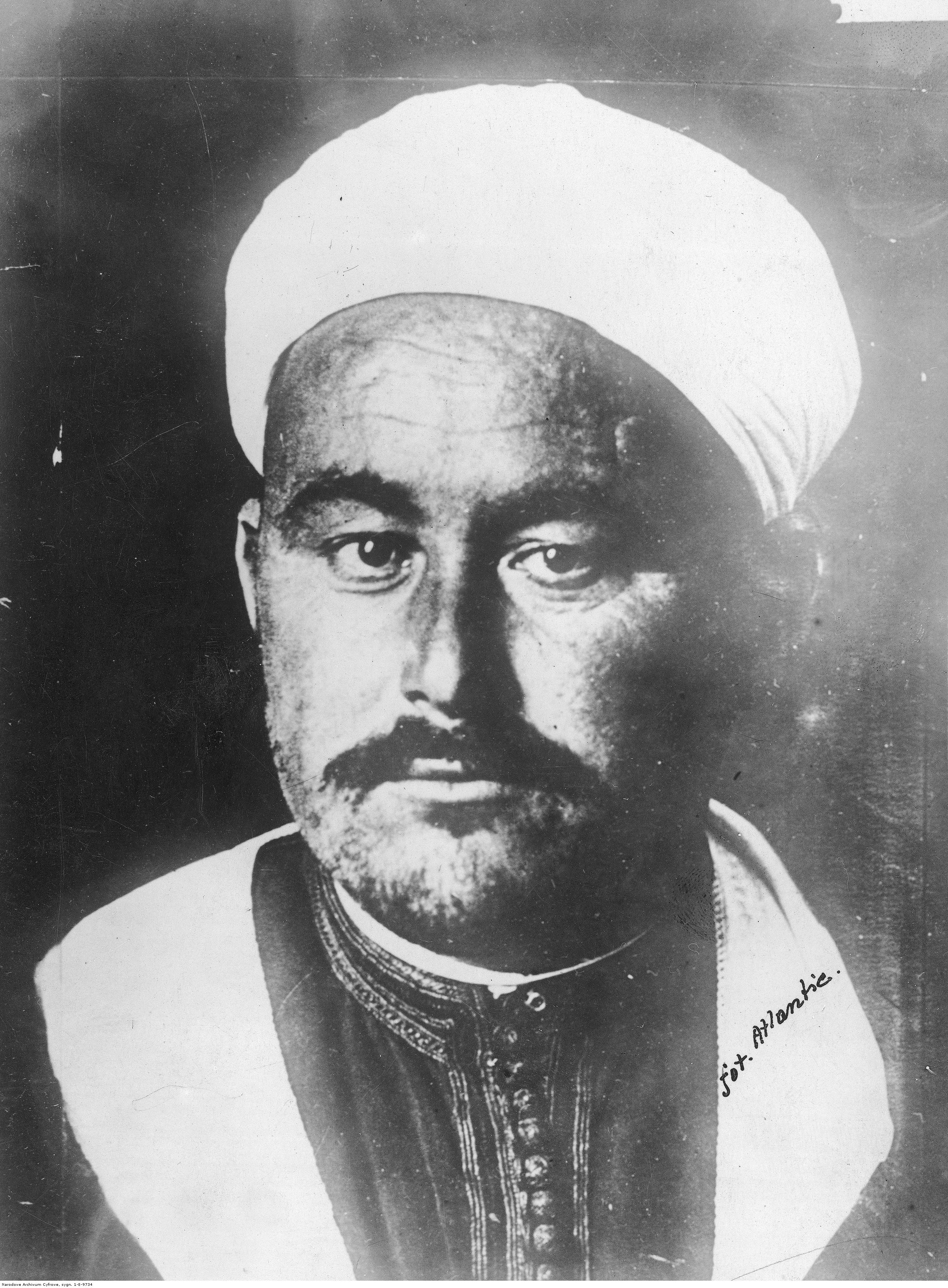
- Abd el-Krim in 1922

President of the Republic of the Rif
- In office 18 September 1921 – 27 May 1926
- Prime Minister: Hajj Hatmi
- Preceded by: Position established
- Succeeded by: Position abolished

Personal details
- Born: 12 January 1882 Ajdir, Morocco
- Died: 6 February 1963 (aged 81) Cairo, Egypt
- Spouse: Lalla Mimouna Boujibar
- Education: University of al-Qarawiyyin
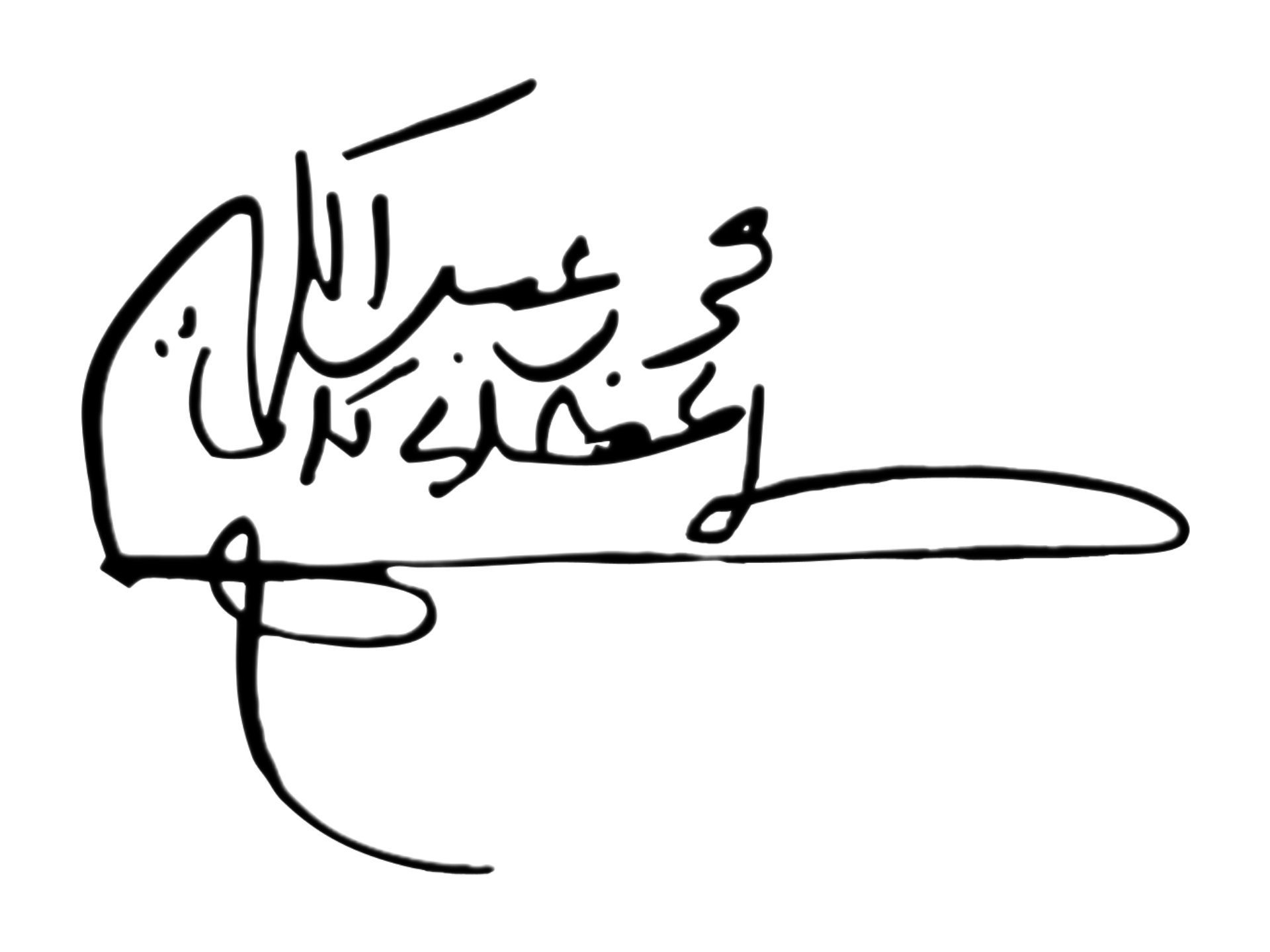
- Signature

Military service
- Allegiance: Republic of the Rif
- Years of service: 1921–1926
- Battles/wars: Rif War: Battle of Abarrán; Siege of Igueriben; Battle of Annual; 1924 retreat from Chefchaoun; Alhucemas landing
- Abd el-Krim's voice Abd el-Krim speaking about the situation in North Africa in 1952

Mohammed ben Abdelkrim El Khattabi, (Note: Tarifit: Muḥend Ɛebdelkrim, also known as Mulay Muḥend Arabic: محمد بن عبد الكريم الخطابي, romanized: Muḥammad ibn ʿAbd al-Karīm al-Khaṭṭābī) better known as Abd el-Krim (Note: Tarifit: Ɛebdelkrim Arabic: عبد الكريم, romanized: ʿAbd al-Karīm) (12 January 1882 – 6 February 1963), was a Moroccan revolutionary, religious, political and military leader and the president of the Republic of the Rif. He and his brother M'Hammad led a large-scale revolt by a coalition of Riffian tribes against the Spanish and French Protectorates of the Rif and the rest of Morocco. His guerrilla tactics, which included the first-ever use of tunneling as a technique of modern warfare, directly influenced Ho Chi Minh, Mao Zedong and Che Guevara. He also became one of the major figures of Arab nationalism, which he supported during his stay in Cairo.

== Early life ==
=== Upbringing and education ===
Muhammad ibn Abd al-Karim was born in 1882 in the settlement of Ajdir, Morocco. He was the son of Abd al-Karim al-Khattabi, a qadi (Islamic judge and chief local leader) of the Ait Youssef ou Ali clan (or Aith Yusif w-'Ari) of the Riffian Ait Ouriaghel tribe. The Ait Youssef ou Ali is part of the two fifths that belong to the Ait Khattab hence the nisba al-Khattabi. He was named qadi in the 1880s by Hassan I.

Abd el-Krim received a customary formative education at a local school in Ajdir and subsequently attended an institute at Tetouan. At the age of 20, he studied for two years in Fez at the Al Attarine and Saffarin madrasas and subsequently enrolled as a student at the University of al-Qarawiyyin, the world's oldest institution of higher education. Both Muhammad and his brother M'Hammad received a Spanish education, the latter studying mine engineering in Málaga and Madrid. Both spoke fluent Spanish and Riffian.

=== Ancestry and identity ===
In a 1952 interview with the weekly Akher Saa, Abd el-Krim defined himself as an ethnic Berber. He explained that his ancestors were Berbers and described the Berber people as "advanced people, who have inherited many civilizations", adding: "We speak Arabic, the language of the Quran, and we understand ourselves in Berber, the language of our ancestors".

Other accounts have offered different perspectives on his background. Riffian families did not keep formal genealogical records, making Abd el-Krim's ancestry difficult to trace. In his memoirs authored by Jacques Roger-Mathieu, Abd el-Krim traced his lineage to a patriarch named Zar'a from Yanbu in the Hejaz, belonging to an Arab tribe known as Ouled Si Mohammed ben Abd el-Krim, from which he derived his name. Zar'a is believed to have immigrated to the Rif and settled among the Beni Ouriaghel in the 10th century.

The researcher Mohamed Tahtah notes that most Moroccan and Arab authors consider Abd el-Krim's family to be Arab. Among these, some trace his surname al-Khattabi back to the second caliph Umar ibn al-Khattab, while others assert a Sharifian ancestry. Abd el-Krim's father traced their family's lineage to a noble Arab family from Tlemcen or from the Draa in the Sous.

By contrast, Mohammed Azarqan, the foreign minister of the Republic of the Rif, maintained that his surname comes from the Aït Khattab clan of the Ait Ouriaghel and has no relation with Umar ibn al-Khattab. Orientalist Pessah Shinar argues that such claims of Arab ancestry "merely accord[s] with the universal practice among Berber leaders attaining prominence and need not to be taken seriously".

European authors such as historian Germain Ayache and anthropologist Robert Montagne assert that his family is entirely of Berber origin. Historian María Rosa de Madariaga also denies Abd el-Krim's alleged sharifian lineage.

=== Early career ===
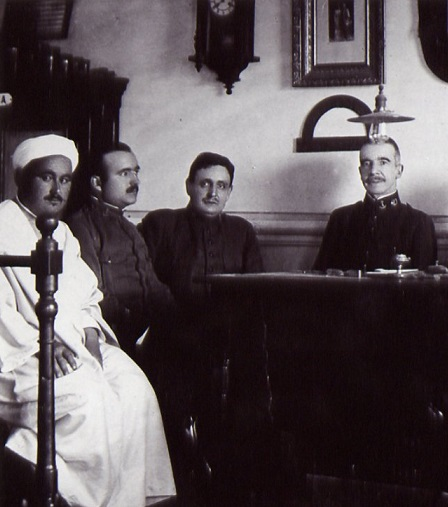
Abd el-Krim (far left) shown while he worked for the Native Affairs Office

Following his studies, Abd el-Krim worked in Melilla as a teacher and translator for the OCTAI, the Spanish 'native affairs' office, and as a journalist for the Spanish daily newspaper El Telegrama del Rif (1906–1915). In 1907, he was hired to edit and write articles in Arabic for El Telegrama del Rif, where he defended the advantages of European—especially Spanish—civilization and technology and their potential to elevate the economic and cultural level of the Moroccan population. In 1910, Abd el-Krim took a position as secretary-interpreter in the Native Affairs Office in Melilla, which brought him into close contact with the Spanish military bureaucracy and the town's civil society and gained a reputation for intelligence, efficiency and discretion.

Early in his career, he was designated in an 1879 document as "Abd al-Karim b. Muhhamad al-Waryaghli". This designation continued until 1902, when it appears to have changed after he became a judge, likely due to the prestige of his new position.

== World War I ==
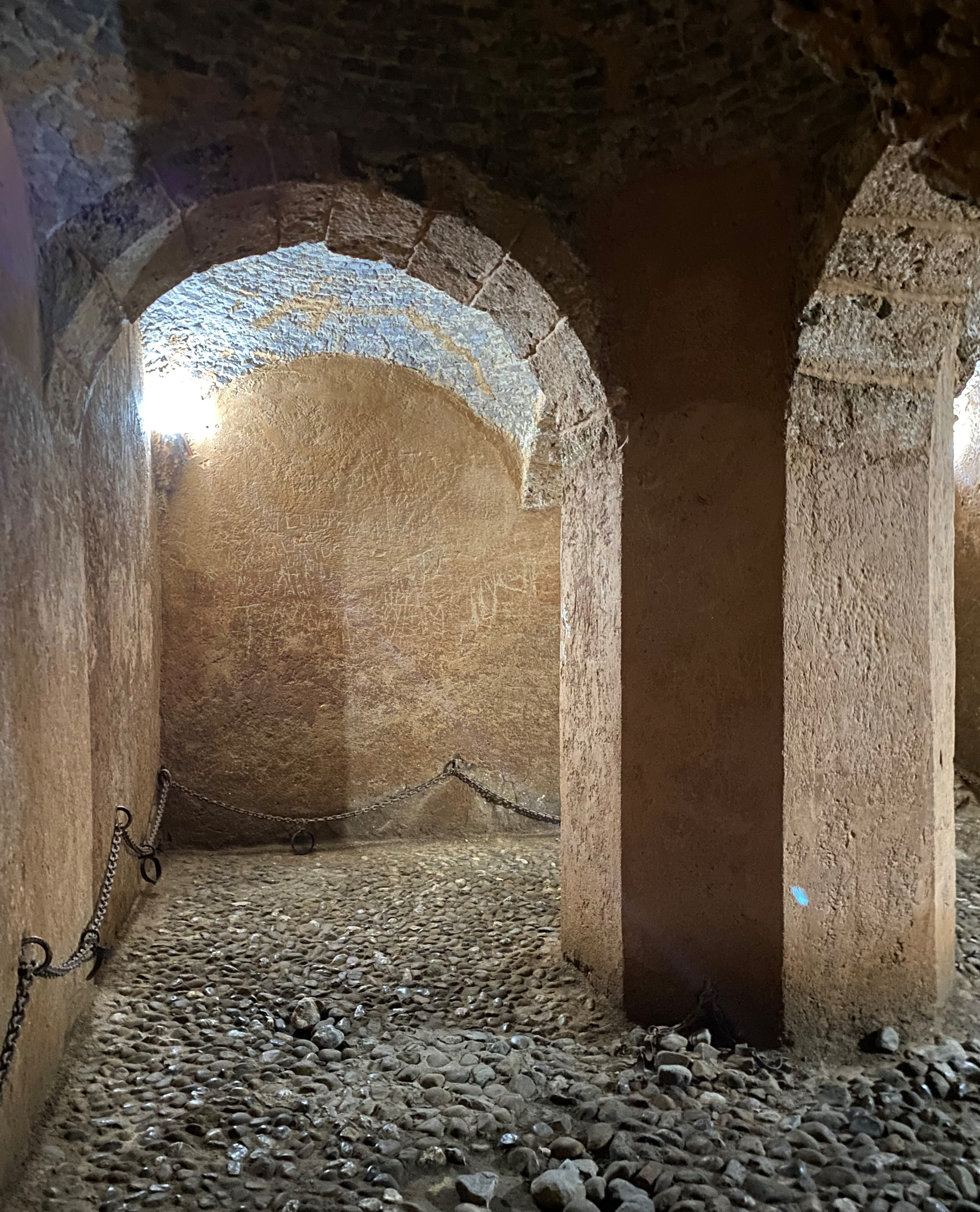
Cell at the Kasbah of Chefchaouen, where Abdelkrim was imprisoned in 1916

Abd el-Krim entered the Spanish administration first as a secretary in the Bureau of Native Affairs, and he was later appointed chief qadi for Melilla in 1915. He taught at a Hispano-Arabic school and was an editor for the Arab section of the newspaper, El Telegrama del Rif.

Before and after the outbreak of World War I, Abd el-Krim was noted as Germanophile, defending it on the basis of arguments brought from the Egyptian and Turkish press. Abd el-Krim offered himself as broker to the Germans to get them mining licenses in the mountains of Beni Uriaguel. His father was indeed one of the leading elements of the German–Turkish operations in the Rif.

In the midst of the conflict, he was arrested. The Spanish authorities sought to please the French, who had claimed the German agents roamed free in Melilla, thus they proceeded to hear a number of complaints on Abd el-Krim. One of the complaints dealt with an alleged involvement in a conspiracy with the German consul Walter Zechlin (1879–1962). He was imprisoned in Chefchaouen from 1916 to 1918 but then escaped. He regained his job as a judge in Melilla.

In 1920, Abd el-Krim, together with his brother, began a war of rebellion against the Spanish incursions. His goal was to unite the tribes of the Rif into an independent Republic of the Rif, to dismantle the entire French-Spanish colonial project in Morocco and to introduce modern political reform.

== Guerrilla leadership ==
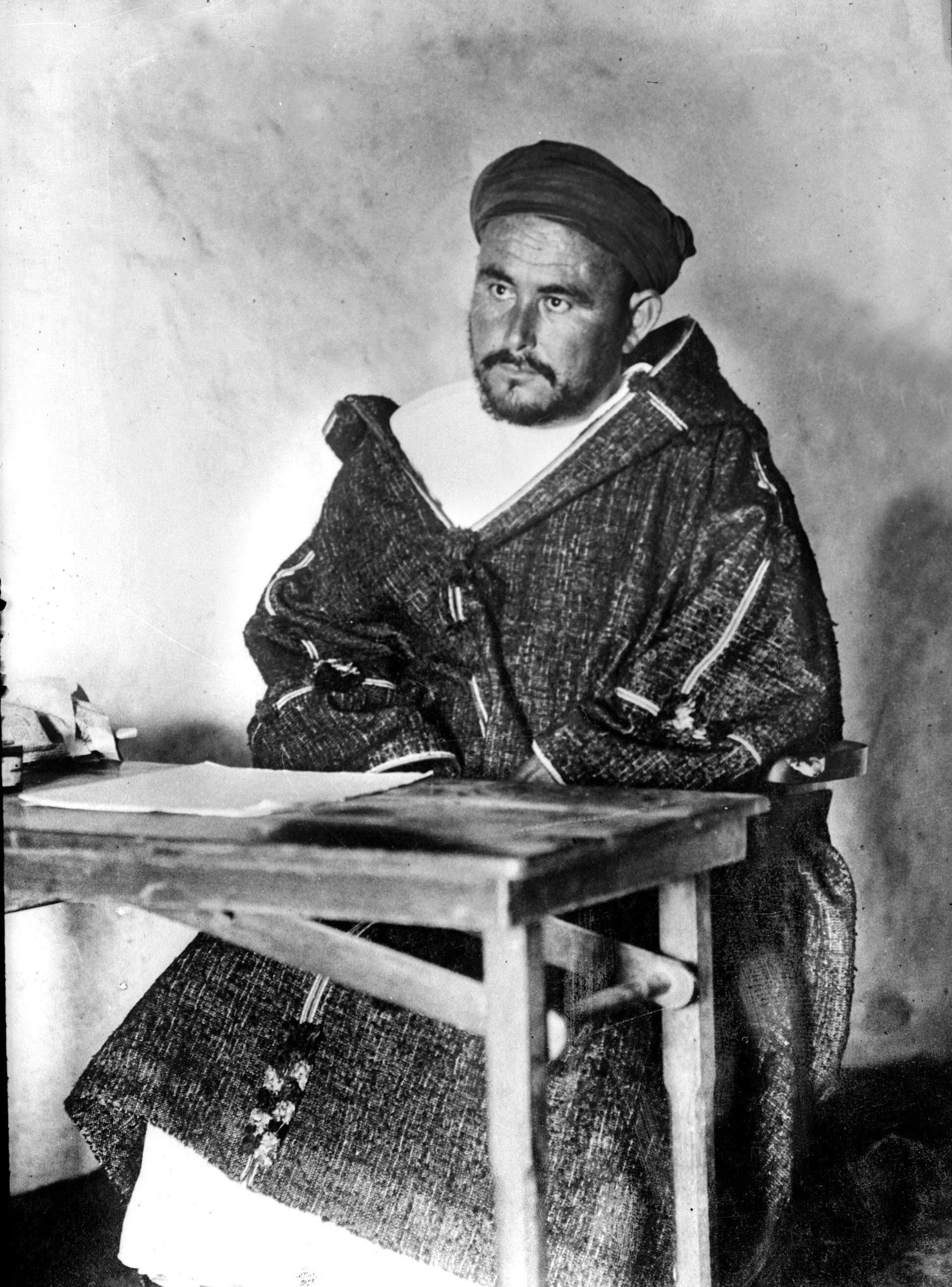
Abd el-Krim in an interview with Luis de Oteyza for the "La Libertad" journal.

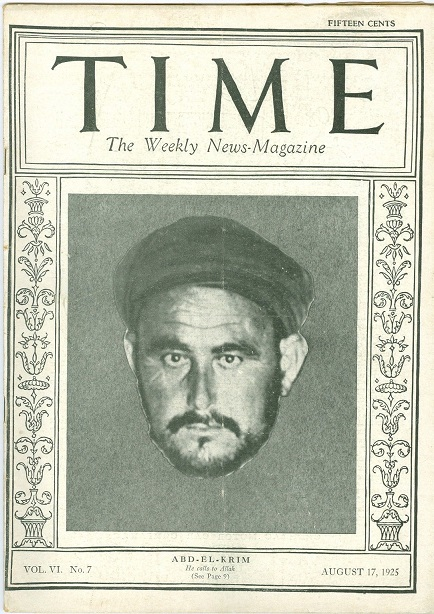
Abd el-Krim featured in the magazine Time in 1925.

In 1921, as a byproduct of their efforts to destroy the power of a local brigand, Ahmed er Raisuni, Spanish troops approached the unoccupied areas of the Rif. Abd el-Krim sent their commander, General Manuel Fernández Silvestre, a warning that if the troops crossed the Ameqqran River, he would consider it as an act of war. Silvestre is said to have dismissed the warning, and shortly afterwards, crossed the river with 60,000 men and set up a military post in the foothills of the Abarran mountains. In June 1921 a sizable Riffian force attacked this post killing 179 of the estimated 250 Spanish troops there. Soon afterwards, Abd el-Krim directed his forces to attack the Spanish army camp at Anwal, which they did with great success. During the attack, General Silvestre, head of the Spanish forces, committed suicide when he saw that defeat was inevitable. In three weeks of fierce battles, 13,000 Spanish and colonial troops were killed. The Rifians' colossal victory established Abd el-Krim as a master and pioneer of guerrilla warfare, and the president of the Republic of the Rif. By July, the remainder of the 60,000 Spanish soldiers who were not killed or captured had fled to the coast, and into Melilla, defeated by an army of 30,000 Rifian fighters.

The catastrophic defeat of the Spanish forces at Annual and the ensuing massacre of Spaniards at Monte Arruit delivered a coup de grace to the Restoration regime in that country, and what it was known as the African "adventure" became referred to as the Moroccan "mess" or "cancer". A coup d'état led by Miguel Primo de Rivera installed a dictatorship in Spain in September 1923.

By 1924, the Spanish forces had retreated, because of more defeats at the hands of Abd el-Krim, to three isolated cities along the Moroccan coast: Tetouan, Ceuta and Melilla (the two latter under Spanish jurisdiction to this day). After Abd el-Krim invaded French-occupied Morocco in April 1925 and made it as far as Fez, France decided to take strong steps to put down the revolt. The French government, in 1925, after conferencing with the Spanish in Madrid, sent a massive French force under Marshal Henri Philippe Pétain to Morocco, where it joined with a Spanish army, with a combined total of more than 250,000 soldiers, supported by large numbers of aircraft and artillery, and began operations against the Rif Republic. By September 1925 the Spanish Army of África, supported by a combined Spanish-French fleet, landed in Alhucemas bay, barely a dozen miles from Abd el-Krim's capital and birthplace, Axdir, while several colonials and even metropolitan French regiments were coming from the south toward the heartlands of the Rifian rebellion.

Intense combat lasted ten months, but eventually, the combined French and Spanish armies, which used chemical bombs against the population as well as other weapons, defeated the forces of Abd el-Krim and inflicted extensive damage on the local Berber population. On 26 May 1926, Abd el-Krim surrendered to the French at his then headquarters of Targuist (Targist).

== Exile ==
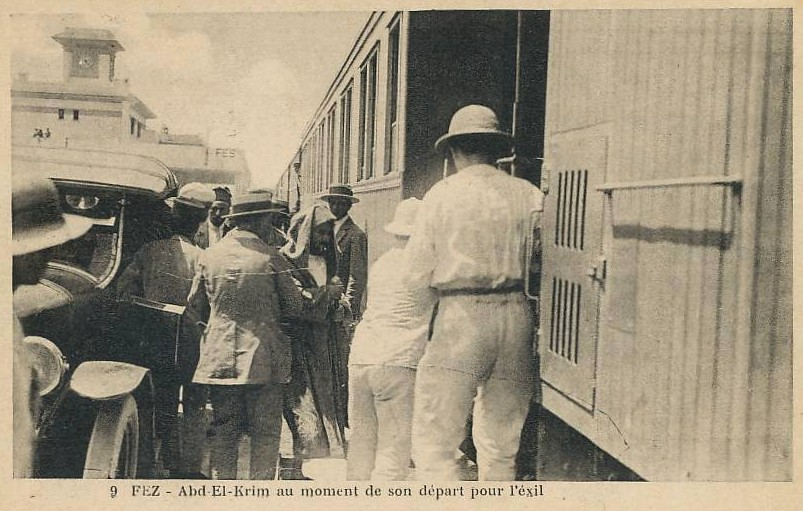
Abd el-Krim boarding a train in Fes on his way to exile

Following his surrender Abd el-Krim was exiled to the island of Réunion (a French territory in the Indian Ocean) from 1926 to 1947, where he was "given a comfortable estate and generous annual subsidiary", before ending up in Cairo. In exile, he continued his fierce anti-Western rhetoric, and he pushed to keep western trends from encroaching on Moroccan culture.

While in Egypt, Abd el-Krim supported the Arab nationalist cause and during the French Indochina War from 1946 to 1954, he corresponded with Ho Chi Minh and called on North African soldiers serving for France to desert to the Viet Minh. He encouraged and supported the Algerian National Liberation Front insurgents during the Algerian War from 1954 to 1962. Abd el-Krim defined the Maghreb as "having owed its existence to Islam" and he saw it as Arab and Muslim which "indissolubly part of Arab countries".

In 1947, Abd el-Krim was given permission to live in the south of France after he had been released on health grounds; however, during his transfer he was freed from his French keepers and escorted to Cairo by Moroccan nationalists. There he received a "hero's welcome" as an important figure of the Arab independence from European colonial rule and was celebrated in international media, thereby drawing attention to the ongoing Moroccan struggle for independence. He was nominally appointed as head of the Liberation Committee of the Arab Maghreb.

Abd el-Krim's flight to Egypt drew global attention to the Moroccan independence movement, highlighting the broader anti-colonial sentiment and the pivotal role of Cairo as a center of transnational activism. This escape not only represented the determination and resilience of the Moroccan independence movement but also helped rally support from both local and international communities, further integrating diverse individuals and groups into the advocacy network of Moroccan nationalists. The incident emphasizes the significance of charismatic and symbolic figures in mobilizing support for national issues and strategically using international platforms to amplify their message.

After Morocco gained independence in 1956, Mohammed V of Morocco invited him back to Morocco. He refused as long as French forces were on North African soil.

== Death ==
He died in 1963, just after he had seen his hopes of a Maghreb independent of colonial powers completed by the independence of Algeria.

== Family ==
Abd el-Krim had 6 sons and 5 daughters from two different women.

On 20 September 2023, Aicha El Khattabi, the daughter of the late Mohamed Ben Abdelkrim El Khattabi, died at the age of 81 in Casablanca. Her funeral took place 2 days later on a Friday, which was attended by Prince Moulay Rachid. The body of the deceased was buried in the Errahma cemetery, after the Dhuhr and funeral prayers.

== Honors and awards ==
- Spain:
  - Order of Isabella the Catholic (Spain; Knight's Cross; 1910)
  - Cross of Military Merit (Spain; Grand Cross - Red Decoration; 1910)
  - Cross of Military Merit (Spain; Grand Cross - White Decoration; 1910)
  - Medalla de África (Spain; Medal; 1910)
  - Medalla de la Paz de Marruecos (Spain; Medal; 1910)
- Tunisia:
  - Order of the Republic of Tunisia (Tunisia; Grand Cross; 1960)

== Sources ==
- Asprey, R.B. (2002) War in the Shadows: The Guerrilla in History, iUniverse Publishing. ISBN 0595225942.
- Boyd, C. (1979) Praetorian Politics in Liberal Spain, University of North Carolina Press: Chapel Hill, North Carolina. ISBN 0807813680.
- Carr, R. (1980) Modern Spain: 1875-1980, Oxford University Press: Oxford. ISBN 0192158287.
- Castro, F., Ramonet, I. & Hurley, A. (2008) Fidel Castro: My Life: a Spoken Autobiography, Scribner: New York. ISBN 978-1-4165-5328-1.
- Cowley, R. & Parker, G. (eds.) (1996) The Reader's Companion to Military History, Houghton Mifflin: Boston. ISBN 9780395669693.
- Er, Mevliyar (2015), "Abd-el-Krim al-Khattabi: The Unknown Mentor of Che Guevara", Terrorism and Political Violence, 27 (5): 137–159, doi:10.1080/09546553.2014.997355, S2CID 145622371ISBN 978-0816504527.
- Keegan, J. & Wheatcroft, A. (2014) Who's Who in Military History: From 1453 to the Present Day, Routledge Publishing: New York. ISBN 1136414169.
- Pennell, C.R. (2004). "Muḥammad b. ʿAbd al-Karīm". In Bearman, P.; Bianquis, Th.; Bosworth, C.E.; van Donzel, E.; Heinrichs, W.P. (eds.). Encyclopaedia of Islam. Vol. XII (2nd ed.). Leiden, Netherlands: E. J. BRILL. ISBN 9004139745.
- Pierson, Peter. (1999) The History of Spain, Greenwood Press: Westport, Connecticut. ISBN 978-0-313-30272-5.
- Roger-Mathieu, J., ed. (1927), Abdelkrim, Mémoires d'Abd el Krim (in French), Paris: Librairie des Champs Elysées
- Ruedy, John (1996), Islamism and Secularism in North Africa, Palgrave Macmillan, ISBN 0-312-16087-9
- Tahtah, M (1999), Entre pragmatisme, réformisme et modernisme: Le rôle politico-religieux des Khattabi dans le Rif (Maroc) jusqu'à 1926 (in French), Leuven: Peeters
- Hart, David Montgomery (1976). The Aith Waryaghar of the Moroccan Rif: An Ethnography and History. University of Arizona Press. ISBN 9780816504527.
