= Siege of Igueriben =

Siege during the Battle of Annual (1921)

- Part of the Rif War
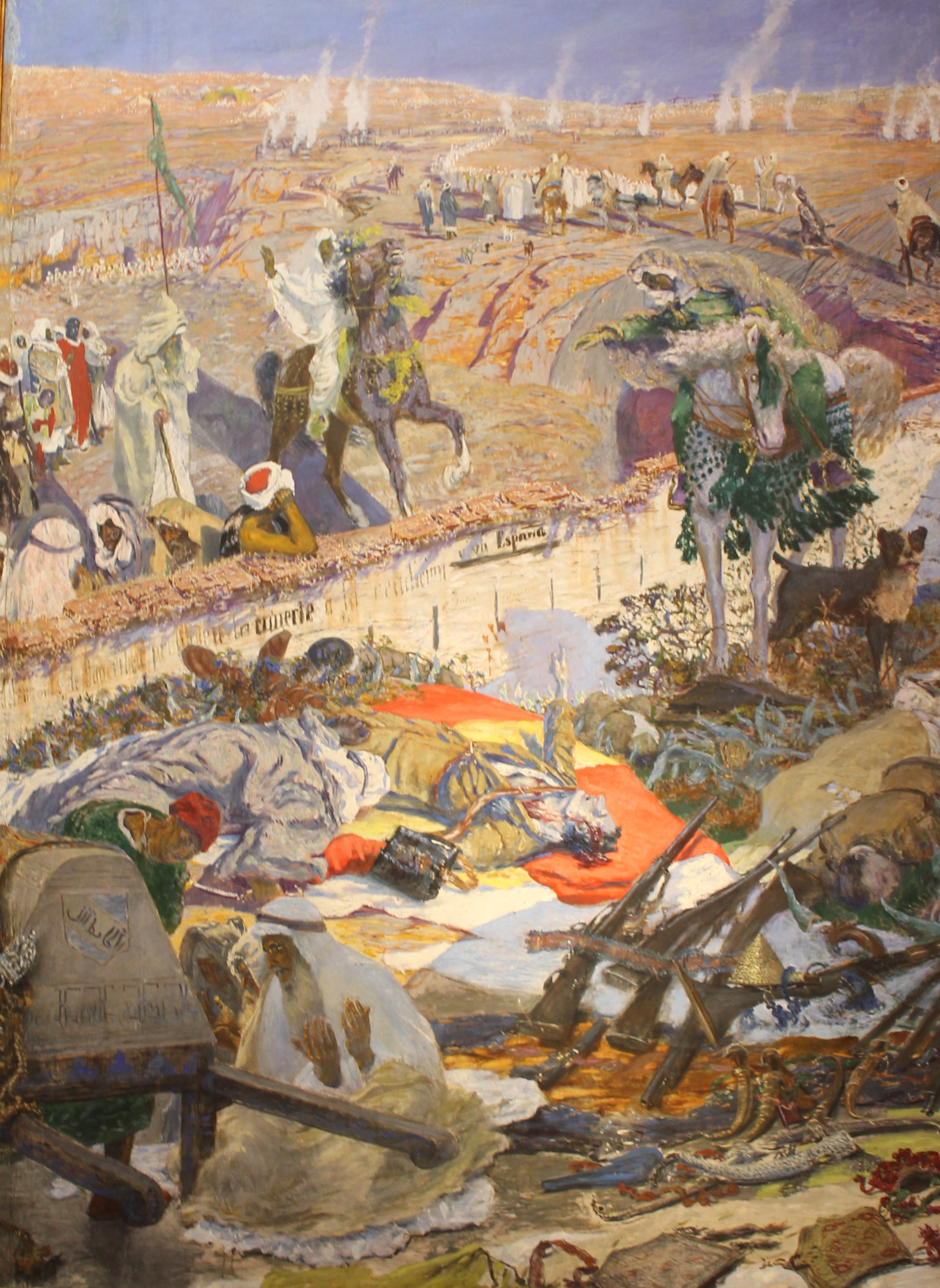
- Those of Igueriben die (1924). Unfinished work by Antonio Muñoz Degrain
Date	16 – 21 July 1921
Location	Igueriben, three miles from Annual, Morocco
Result	Rifian victory

Belligerents
Riffian tribes	Spain

Commanders and leaders
Abd el-Krim	Julio Benítez Benítez †

Strength
Unknown	300 men

Casualties and losses
Unknown	275 killed

The siege of Igueriben was a clash between the Rif tribes of Abd el-Krim and the Spanish army, from 16 to July 21, 1921, in the Spanish base of Igueriben where they were besieged by forces of Abd el-Krim. The clash ended with the victory of Abd el-Krim's forces, wiping out the Spanish contingent.

== Background ==
During the Rif war, the Spanish general, Manuel Fernández Silvestre, was operating on the eastern zone of the Spanish colony in Rif. The region was dominated by the Rif mountains and their tribes, proving a serious obstacle to Silvestre's forces. On January 21, 1921, the Spanish took Annual as their base. Not all Riffian tribes submitted to the Spanish rule. Abd el-Krim and his brother determined to stop the colonization process.

In late May, the Riffian forces assaulted the base of Abarrán, which they captured. A minor defeats would soon follow up with the debacle at Annual.

== Siege ==
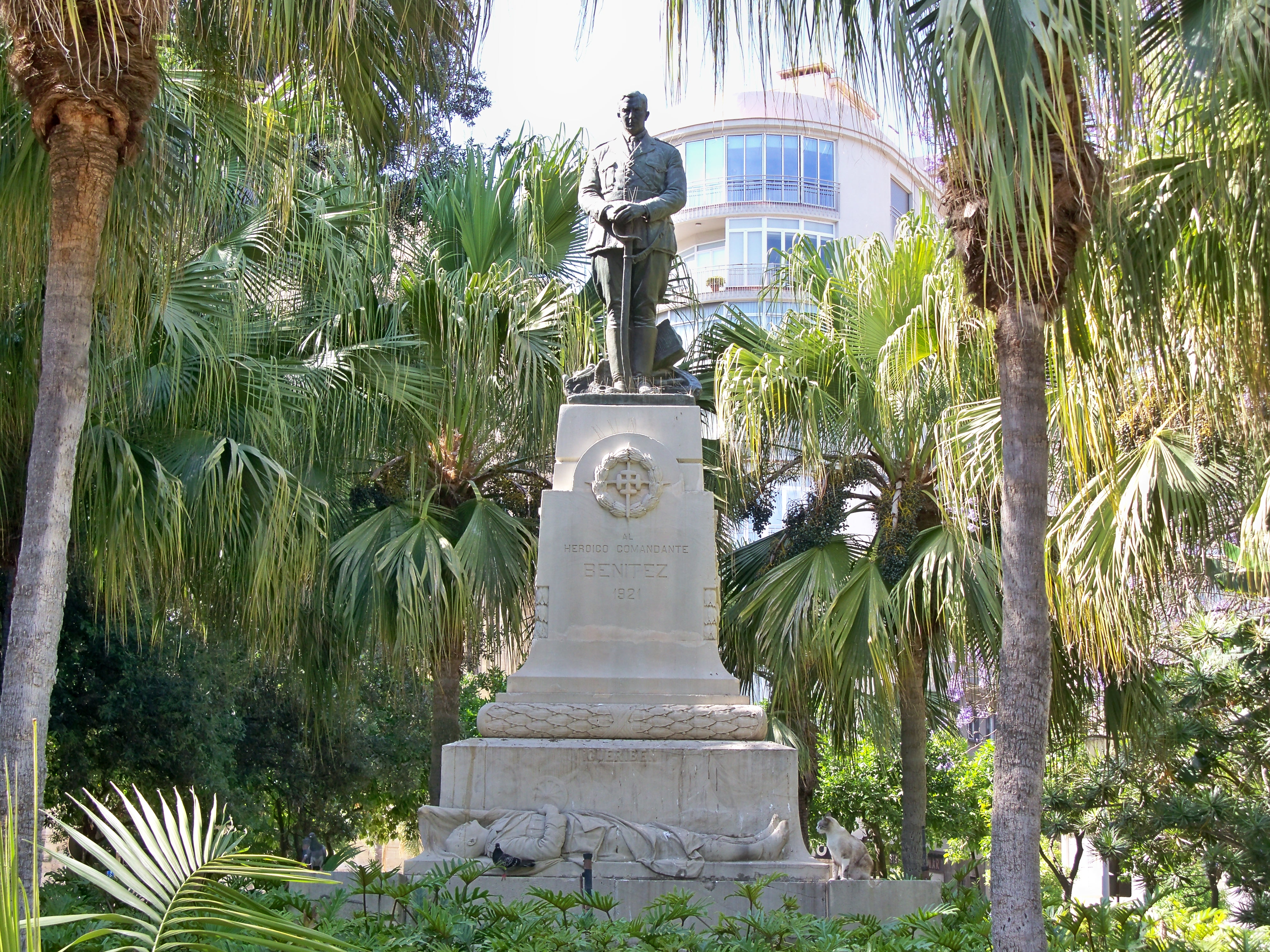
Monument to Commander Benitez and the Heroes of Igueriben

The next Spanish base was attacked at Igueriben on July 16. Located three miles from Annual where it was quickly surrounded and cut off from Annual. The commander of the base was Major Julio Benitez. The defenses were weak and incomplete, but the Major refused to surrender, preferring to die instead. Messages were dispatched from General Navarro, second-in-command to Silvestre, encouraging the garrison fight. His men fought valiantly, but their water supplies were three miles away from Annual. As the battle raged on, and the heat striking the troops, they were forced to drink juice from used pimiento and tomato tins, then vinegar, cologne, and ink, and finally even urine with sugar in it. At Annual, they dispatched a relief column which they got close to the base where were seen by the garrison. However, the only access to the base was through a deep gorge heavily defended by the Riffians. They were repelled by machine guns and heavy artillery, and the relief column retreated after suffering 152 killed. Igueriben was captured on the end, and Benitez was killed alongside the majority of his men. Only 25 men out of 300 survived whom they later reached the base at Annual.

== Sources ==
- José E. Álvarez (2001), The Betrothed of Death, The Spanish Foreign Legion During the Rif Rebellion, 1920–1927.
- Juan Carlos Lopez Sanz (2017), 1921 Lágrimas en los ojos del Rif.
- David S. Woolman (1968), Rebels in the Rif: Abd El Krim and the Rif Rebellion.
