= Battle of Abarrán =

1921 battle during the Rif War

- Part of the Rif War
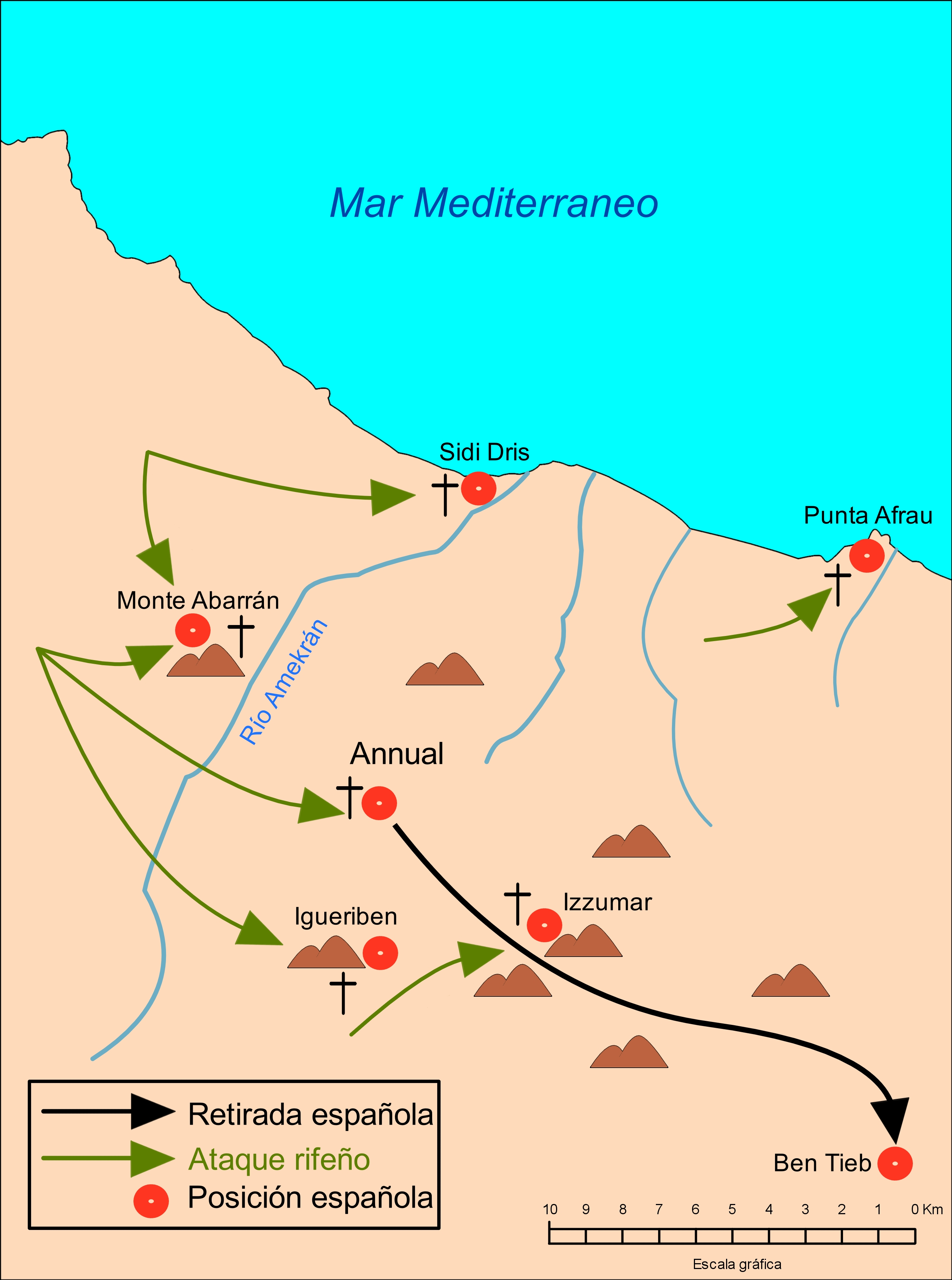
- Riffian advances prior to Annual disaster
Date	1 June 1921
Location	Montain Abarrán
Result	Rifian victory

Belligerents
Riffian tribes	Spain

Commanders and leaders
Abd el-Krim Mohamed Boulehia Benali	Captain Salafranca †

Strength
Unknown	250 men

Casualties and losses
Unknown	179 killed

The Battle of Abarrán was a military engagement during the Rif War. It happened when the Spanish established a post in Mountain Abarrán. They were attacked by Riffians and massacred.

== Context ==
During the Rif war, the Riffian leader, Abd el-Krim, faced the Spanish army advance led by Manuel Fernández Silvestre. Abd el-Krim's father attempted to resist but died poisend; his son took over as the new leader. Abdul Karim successfully managed to unite six Kablye tribes in central Rif in January 1921; however, due to a bad harvest, it weakened his force, which made him retreat to Temsamane with 300 men. Unexpectedly, in May of the same year, a delegation from the Temsamane tribe arrived to the Spanish, asking him for protection and to establish a post in Mountain Abarrán. Silvestre agreed.

== Battle ==
Silvestre advanced to Abarrán. There he established a sandbag outpost with walls just 3 feet high. Silvestre left 250 Spanish troops and some native police at the post and left. An unexpected event happened on June 1 afternoon. Once the Spanish had left, the native police mutinied and began killing the officers and aided the Temsamane in attacking the garrison. The Spanish heard gunshots but didn't return. The post was fired from a hill and assaulted from another side. In the following massacre, 179 Spanish were killed, including the commander, Captain Salafranca, and the rest escaped. Following this, the Riffians captured four Krupp guns and 200 rifles.

== Sources ==
- Martin Windrow (2010), Our Friends Beneath the Sands, The Foreign Legion in France's Colonial Conquests 1870–1935.
- Javier Garcia de Gabiola (2022), The Rif War, Volume 1 - From Taxdirt to the Disaster of Annual 1909–1921.
- David S. Woolman (1968), Rebels in the Rif: Abd El Krim and the Rif Rebellion.
