= Republic of the Rif =

1921–1926 republic in Morocco

Coordinates: 35°12′N 3°55′W

Republic of the Rif جمهورية الريف (Arabic) Tagduda n Rif (Tarifit)
- 1921–1926
- Flag Emblem
- Anthem: الريف موطننا; "Rif, our Homeland"
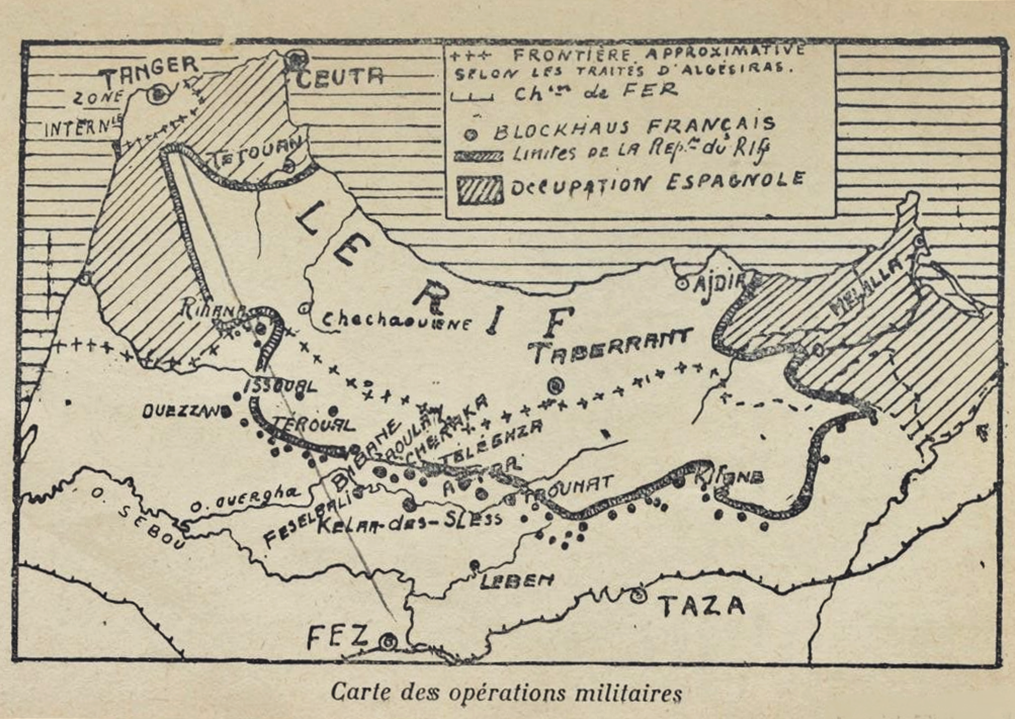
- Territory of Spanish Morocco under control of the Rif Republic.
- Capital: Ajdir
- Official languages: Arabic
- Common languages: Tarifit, Jebli Arabic
- Religion: Sunni Islam
- Government: Confederal presidential Islamic republic
- President
  - 1921–1926: Abd el-Krim
- Prime Minister
  - 1921–1926: Hajj Hatmi
- Historical era: Interwar period
  - Established: 18 September 1921
  - Rif War: 8 June 1921
  - Disestablished: 27 May 1926
- Currency: Riffan de-jure Spanish pesetas de-facto
Preceded by	Succeeded by
Riffians; Spanish Morocco	Spanish protectorate in Morocco
- Today part of: Morocco

The Republic of the Rif (Arabic: جمهورية الريف, romanized: Jumhūriyyatu r-Rīf; Tarifit: Tagududa n Rif) was a confederate republic in the Rif, Morocco, that existed between 1921 and 1926. It was created in September 1921, when a coalition of Riffians and Jebala led by Abd el-Krim revolted in the Rif War against the Spanish protectorate in Morocco. The French would intervene on the side of Spain in the later stages of the conflict.

A protracted struggle for independence killed many Rifians and Spanish–French soldiers, and witnessed the use of chemical weapons by the Spanish army—their first widespread deployment since the end of World War I. The eventual Spanish–French victory was owed to the technological and manpower advantages despite their lack of morale and coherence. Following the war's end, the Republic was ultimately dissolved in 1926.

== History ==
=== Background ===
The French and Spanish empires both colonized Morocco, and in 1912 the Treaty Between France and Spain Regarding Morocco established Spanish and French protectorates there.

France's general approach to governing the protectorate of Morocco was a policy of indirect rule, where they co-opted existing governance systems to control the protectorate. Specifically, the Moroccan elite and the sultans of Morocco were both left in control while being strongly influenced by the French government.

French and Spanish colonialism in Morocco was discriminatory against the native Rifians and Sahrawis and was highly detrimental to the Moroccan economy. Moroccans were treated as second-class citizens and discriminated against in all aspects of colonial life.

Infrastructure was discriminatory in colonial Morocco. The French colonial government built 36.5 kilometers of sewers in the new neighborhoods created to accommodate new French settlers, while only 4.3 kilometers of sewers were built in indigenous Moroccan communities. Additionally, land in Morocco was far more expensive for Moroccans than for French settlers. For example, while the average Moroccan had a plot of land 50 times smaller than their French settler counterparts, Moroccans were forced to pay 24% more per hectare. Moroccans were additionally prohibited from buying land from French settlers.

Colonial Morocco's economy was designed to benefit French businesses at the detriment of Moroccan laborers. Morocco was forced to import all of its goods from France despite higher costs. Additionally, improvements to agriculture and irrigation systems in Morocco exclusively benefited colonial agriculturalists while leaving Moroccan farms at a technological disadvantage. It is estimated that French colonial policies resulted in 95% of Morocco's trade deficit by 1950.

Following the allowance of its interests and recognition of its influence in northern Morocco through the 1904 Entente Cordiale, 1906 Algeciras Conference and 1907 Pact of Cartagena, Restoration-era Spain occupied Ras Kebdana, a town near the Moulouya River, in March 1908 and launched the Melillan and Kert campaigns against the Riffian tribes between 1909 and 1912. In June 1911, Spanish troops occupied Larache and Ksar el-Kebir.

The Moroccan independence president Abd el-Krim (1882–1963) organized an armed revolution, the Rif War, against the Spanish and French colonial control of Morocco. The Spanish had faced unrest off and on from the 1890s, but in 1921 Spanish colonial troops were massacred at the Battle of Annual. Abd el-Krim founded an independent Republic, the Rif Republic.

=== Declaration of independence ===
After the Battle of Annual in the summer of 1921, Abd-el-Krim felt more confident in effectively organizing and developing the Riffian movement, which had emerged throughout the Rif War. The territory of the Rif was liberated by the Riffian tribes. The lack of a coherent Riffian regular army and the absence of a central coordinating body among the Riffian tribes, as well as the management of their own economy and administration, led Abd-el-Krim to democratically hold a general congress. There, they could study and evaluate the situation following the victory and establish new tools for a more solid national liberation movement. The approach was accepted with great enthusiasm by the Riffians, and that was how the representatives of the tribes were invited to participate.

The meeting took place on September 18, 1921. Abd el-Krim began with a major speech, in which he spoke about the relationship between the Rif, Spain, and Morocco. He denounced all forms of colonialism, both Spanish colonialism and French colonialism, and spoke against accepting any treaty with the Spanish protectorate in Morocco.

We have never recognized this protectorate and we never will. We wish to be our own rulers and to maintain and preserve our legal and indisputable rights; we will defend our independence by all means at our disposal and raise our protest before the Spanish nation and before its intelligent people, who we believe do not dispute the legality of our demands.

— Abd-el-Krim

In the same event, several important points were agreed upon, including the independence of the Rif. Abd-el-Krim was named emir, a National Council of Notables was established, and September 18 was set as Independence Day. The payment of compensation by Spain to the Riffians affected by the Rif War and by the military occupation over the last twelve years was also adopted, along with foreign policy.

=== Fall ===
France and Spain did not recognize the Republic and collaborated to destroy it. They sent in 200,000 soldiers, forcing Abd el-Krim to surrender in 1926. He was exiled in the Pacific until 1947. Morocco became quiet, and in 1936 became the base from which Francisco Franco launched the fascist coup of July 1936.

In 1921, local Rifians, under the leadership of Abd el-Krim, crushed a Spanish offensive led by General Manuel Fernández Silvestre at the Battle of Annual, and soon after declared the creation of an independent republic on 18 September 1921. The republic was formally constituted in 1923, with Abd el-Krim as head of state, and Ben Hajj Hatmi as prime minister.

Abd el-Krim handed the Spanish numerous defeats, driving them back to coastal outposts. With the war ongoing, he sent diplomatic representatives to London and Paris, in an ultimately futile attempt to establish legitimate diplomatic relations with other European powers.

In late 1925, the French and Spanish created a joint task force of 500,000 men, supported by tanks and aircraft. After 1923, the Spanish employed the use of chemical weapons imported from Germany. The Republic was dissolved by Spanish and French occupation forces on 27 May 1926, but many Rif guerrillas continued to fight until 1927.

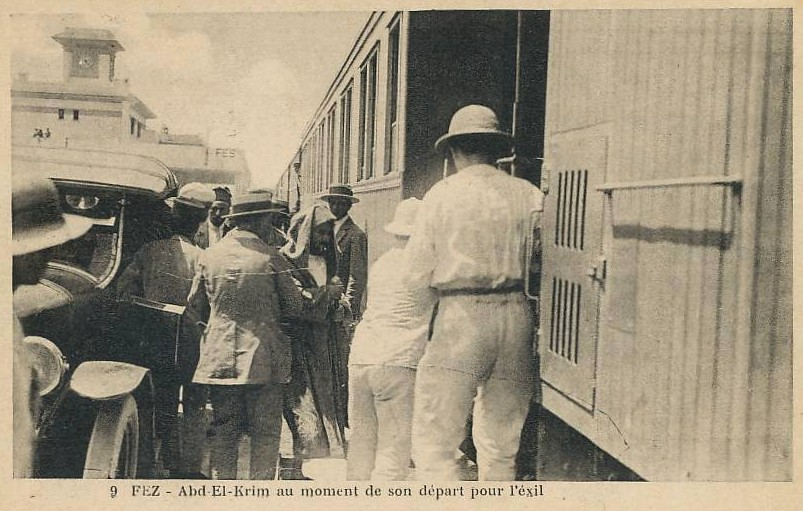
Abd-el-Krim boarding a Fez-Tangier train in 1926 on his way to exile in the Indian Ocean island of Réunion

In April 1925, Abd el-Krim proclaimed the independent Republic in the Rif region of Spanish Morocco. He advanced south into French Morocco, defeating French forces and threatening the capital, Fes. The resident-general, Hubert Lyautey, was replaced as military commander by Philippe Pétain on 3 September 1925. On 11 October 1925, Théodore Steeg replaced Lyautey as resident-general with the mandate of restoring peace and making the transition from military to civilian government. Lyautey received very little recognition for his achievement in securing Morocco as a colony. Steeg would have been willing to give autonomy to the people of the Rif, but was overruled by the army.

Abd el-Krim surrendered to Philippe Pétain on 26 May 1926 and was deported to Réunion in the Indian Ocean, where he was held until 1947. Théodore Steeg said Abd el-Krim was a great leader and national and folk hero, but Abd el-Krim wanted "neither [to be] exalted nor humiliated, but in time forgotten."

== Government and politics ==
The Riffian National Council held several sessions, approving a constitution of 40 articles based on the principle of popular authority. The members of the government were accountable to the National Assembly. Therefore, Abd-el-Krim was appointed President of the Council. According to Achtatou—cited by Salafranca—this constitution, along with numerous other documents, was burned by Spanish troops when they captured Ajdir. The Riffian state was named Dawlat Aljumhuriya Rifiya (Riffian Republican State). The next step was the formation of a modern government to put an end to the old traditional structures and introduce a democratic model based on a highly representative administration. It was composed of the President or Emir, the Vice President (M'hamed Abd el-Krim, brother of Abd-el-Krim), and four ministers (of Finance, Foreign Affairs and Navy, Defense, and Interior), in addition to two secretaries and three inspectors and paymasters. The spirit of change and modernity is reflected in the fact that most of these members were young men under the age of 45; Qaid Sedik, Abd-el-Krim's private secretary, was only 22 years old. All of them had higher education and language proficiency, serving as a tool for communication with representatives of other countries and for delivering their message to the international community.

=== Diplomacy ===
There were two primary objectives that the Riffian leaders attempted to achieve through their diplomatic strategies. The first was the establishment of friendly relations with all states, which can be evidenced by a letter written by the Riffian leaders to the Spanish, saying:

It surprises us that you ignore the interests of Spain itself by not making peace with the Rif through the recognition of its independence, and thus promoting good neighborly relations, instead of humiliating our people and ignoring all the humane and legal doctrines of universal law, as contained in the Treaty of Versailles signed after the Great War [the First World War].

— Riffian leaders

The second objective was admission into the League of Nations (precursor to the United Nations). This effort included a famous letter addressed to the League of Nations by Arnall and Bujibar, who traveled to London in June 1922. This document, sent from London to the General Council on September 6, 1922, stated the following:

We, duly accredited representatives of the true Government of the Republic of the Rif, inform you that we have constituted a duly elected representative power, composed of deputies from forty-one tribes of the Rif and Ghomara. Among the most important points agreed upon, we have a duly elected representative assembly that governs our country in full conformity with the objectives of the League of Nations; second, we are willing to guarantee the rights of all nations in all areas related to commerce, and we will under no circumstances establish duties more burdensome than those set in other regions of Morocco; another point, we are willing to provide proof and guarantees demonstrating that we are capable of governing the country in the interest of peace and international trade.

— Arnall and Bujibar (representatives of the Republic)

The Riffian government, established according to modern ideas and the principles of western civilization, considers itself independent both politically and economically, with the privilege of enjoying our freedom as we have enjoyed it for centuries, and living just as other peoples live.

— Mohamed Azerkan, Minister of Foreign Affairs of the Republic of the Rif

=== Finance ===
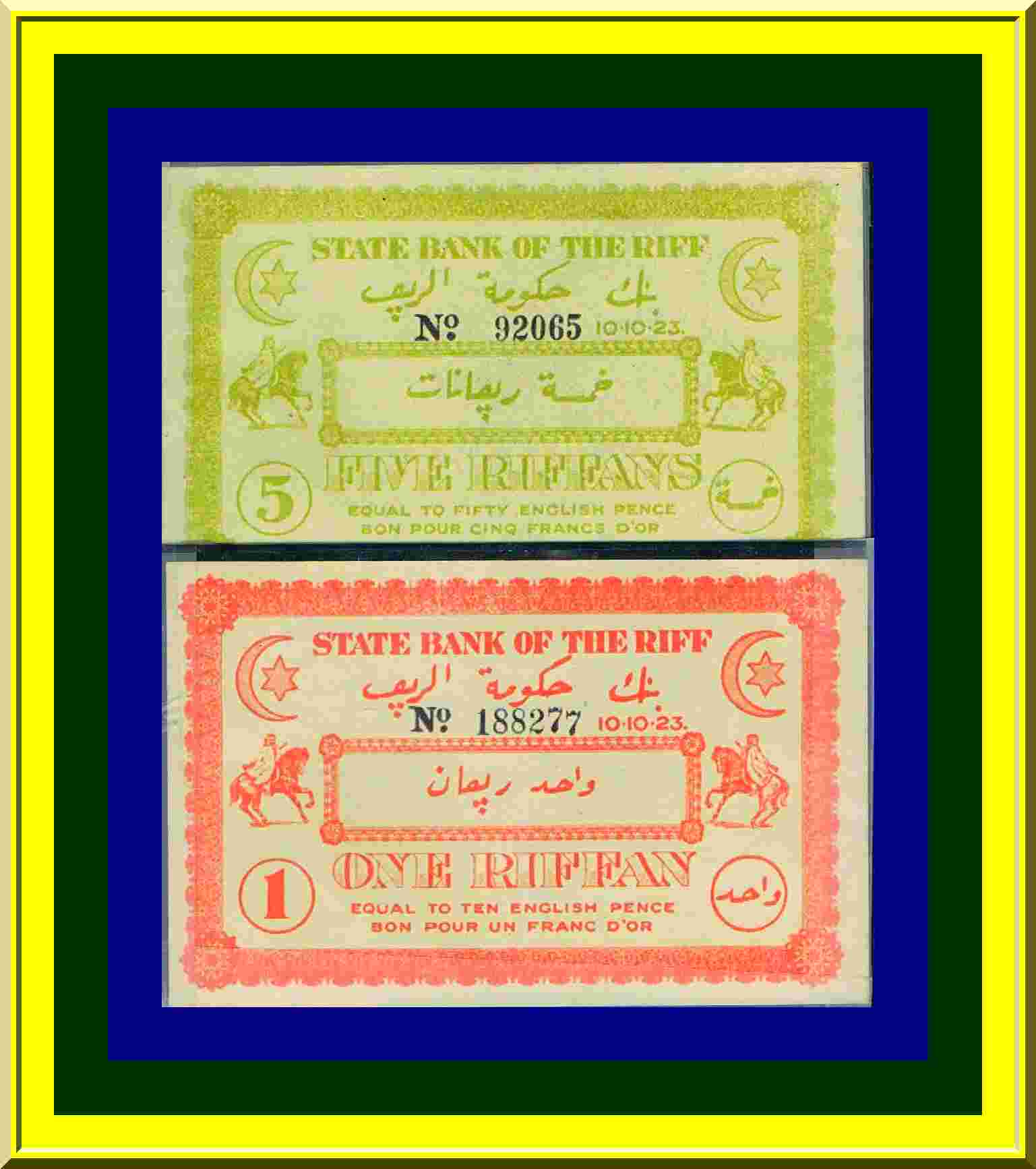
Riffan, the currency of the Rif Republic

During the Rif War, President Abd el-Krim sought to modernize the administration of the newly declared Republic. Central to this was the establishment of a national financial system to assert sovereignty and move away from the Spanish peseta and Moroccan franc. To complete the organization of the state, M'hamed El Khattabi, the President's brother, hired the English captain and financier Charles Alfred Percy Gardiner in 1923 to create the Bank of the Rif State, with authority to issue banknotes. The Englishman made many withdrawals of money for his own benefit, including supposed mines that did not exist and all kinds of agencies and services under monopoly control. This whole scheme fell apart shortly afterward, because Gardiner turned out to be an opportunistic swindler, without the material and financial means to carry out the provisions of the signed contract. Even so, as a singular initiative, and although the aforementioned state bank was never actually created, Gardiner sent to the Rif an unspecified quantity of one- and five-riffan banknotes that never circulated.

== See also ==
- Spanish use of chemical weapons in the Rif War

== Sources ==
- Ansprenger, Franz (1989). The Dissolution of the Colonial Empires. Taylor & Francis. ISBN 978-0-415-03143-1.
- Clark, Christopher (19 March 2013). The Sleepwalkers: How Europe Went to War in 1914. HarperCollins. ISBN 978-0-06-114665-7.
- De Madariaga, María Rosa: Abd-el-Krim el Jatabi: la lucha por la independencia. España: Alianza Editorial, 2009.
- Griffiths, Richard (2011-05-19). Marshal Pétain. Faber & Faber. p. 111. ISBN 978-0-571-27909-8.
- Jolly, Jean (1977). "STEEG (JULES, JOSEPH, Théodore)". Dictionnaire des parlementaires français: notices biographiques sur les ministres, sénateurs et députés français de 1889 à 1940 (in French). Presses universitaires de France.
- León Rojas, José (2018). "Tarifa y las Campañas de Marruecos (1909-1927)". Aljaranda. 1 (92). Tarifa: Ayuntamiento de Tarifa: 47–66. ISSN 1130-7986.
- Lepage, Jean-Denis G.G. (2008). The French Foreign Legion: An Illustrated History. McFarland. p. 125. ISBN 978-0-7864-6253-7.
- Martín, Miguel: El colonialismo español en Marruecos (1860-1956). Madrid: Club de Amigos de la UNESCO, 2002.
- Ramos Oliver, Francisco (2013). "Las guerras de Marruecos" (PDF). Entemu. Gijón: UNED Centro Asociado de Asturias: 165–185. ISBN 978-84-88642-16-5. ISSN 1130-314X. Archived from the original (PDF) on 2020-08-27.
- Saro Gandarillas, Francisco (1993). "Los orígenes de la Campaña del Rif de 1909". Aldaba (22). Melilla: UNED: 97–130. doi:10.5944/aldaba.22.1993.20298 (inactive 12 July 2025). ISSN 0213-7925. Archived from the original on 28 October 2023.
- Woolman, David S. (1968). Rebels in the Rif: Abd El Krim and the Rif Rebellion. Stanford University Press. p. 195. ISBN 978-0-8047-0664-3.
