= María Rosa de Madariaga =

Spanish historian (1937–2022)

María Rosa de Madariaga Álvarez-Prida (9 February 1937 – 29 June 2022) was a Spanish historian and translator, specialized in the study of relations between Morocco and Spain and the Protectorate period. She was the niece of Salvador de Madariaga.
