= El Telegrama del Rif =

Melillan daily newspaper

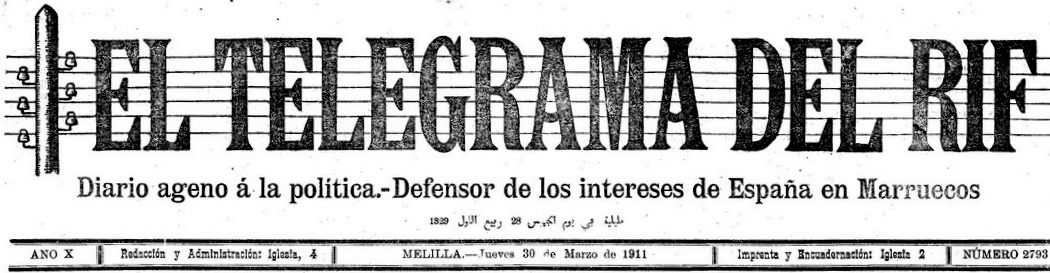
- Type: Daily newspaper
- Founder: Cándido Lobera Girela
- Founded: 1 March 1902
- Ceased publication: 29 May 2015
- Language: Spanish
- Headquarters: Melilla
- Country: Spain
- ISSN: 2386-494X

El Telegrama del Rif (Spanish: [el telegɾa'ma ðel rif], 'The Rif Telegram')—renamed El Telegrama de Melilla from 1963— is the name of a daily newspaper based in Melilla. It was founded after the Spanish–American War in 1898, when Spain began to wish for a greater military and economic influence in the Rif.

== History ==
It was founded on March 1, 1902 by the artillery captain and journalist Cándido Lobera Girela, originally with the name El Telegrama, though it was soon changed to El Telegrama del Rif. It had the subtitle 'Diario ageno á [sic] la política, defensor de los intereses de España en Marruecos' , meaning 'Apolitical journal, protector of the interests of Spain in Morocco.' In the beginning, El Telegrama del Rif kept a conservative and militarist style, defending Spanish intervention in Morocco.

The start of the newspaper roughly coincides with Spanish military campaigns against the Riffians who opposed the extension of Spanish colonial influence in the zone. Because of this, the content of the newspaper was especially focused on news related to the avatars of the war and local information. Its content is therefore an important source of knowledge about this period, as well as the later Spanish protectorate in Morocco.

El Telegrama del Rif had among its collaborators notable figures such as the Moroccan military leader Abd el-Krim —who was editor of the newspaper’s Arabic section—, the military doctor Cándido Jurado — who in 1919 wrote popular science articles about the lethargic encephalitis epidemic that was devastating the city of Melilla and the Rif— and the writer Ramón J. Sender — who contributed to the newspaper during his time in Melilla, where he was doing his military service. During World War I, Abd el-Krim turned his section into a fierce vehicle of anti-French rhetoric, until 1917, when French protests led to its suppression.

After the outbreak of the Spanish Civil War and the establishment of Franco’s dictatorship, the newspaper came under the control of the Nationalists. In 1957 fit was acquired by the State and became part of the Francoist press network (Cadena de Prensa del Movimiento). During the Francoist period, it was one of the newspapers in the network whose staff — despite its small size — had some of the best salaries. In 1963, a few years after the independence of Morocco, the newspaper adopted the name El Telegrama de Melilla. After Franco’s death, the newspaper was incorporated into the state media agency, Medios de Comunicación Social del Estado (MCSE). Its poor economic situation led to its closure one May 17, 1984, coinciding with the dissolution of the MCSE. According to some historians, the closure was decided in part due to fears that Morocco might acquire the newspaper and use it as a propaganda outlet.

From 1992, it was published again, in both print and digital editions, until May 29, 2015, when it closed again due to financial problems.

== Editorial office ==
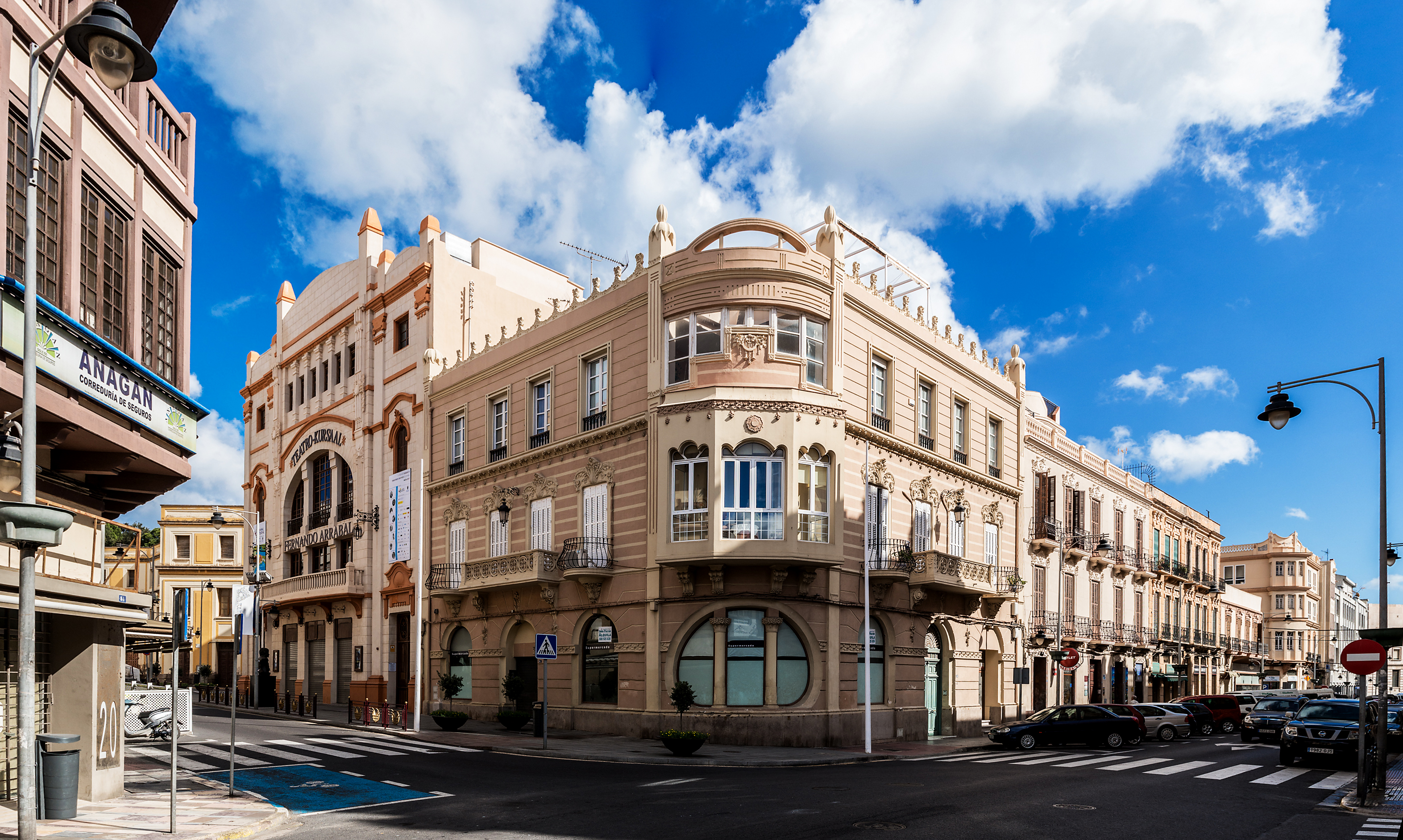
Editorial Office of the newspaper.

Since its founding, the newspaper's headquarters and printing press were located in buildings on Miguel Acosta Street in Melilla la Vieja, until they were moved to the Ensanche of Melilla — first to a building on Santa Bárbara Street, and by December 1912, the first issue was published from its permanent headquarters, a Modernist building designed specifically for this purpose by architect Enrique Nieto, located on Ejército Español Street. Today, this building is known as the Editorial Office of El Telegrama del Rif.

== See also ==
- Spanish protectorate in Morocco
